= Siege of Kazan (1487) =

Russia's expansion to the East

- Part of the Russo-Kazan Wars and the Kazan succession crises
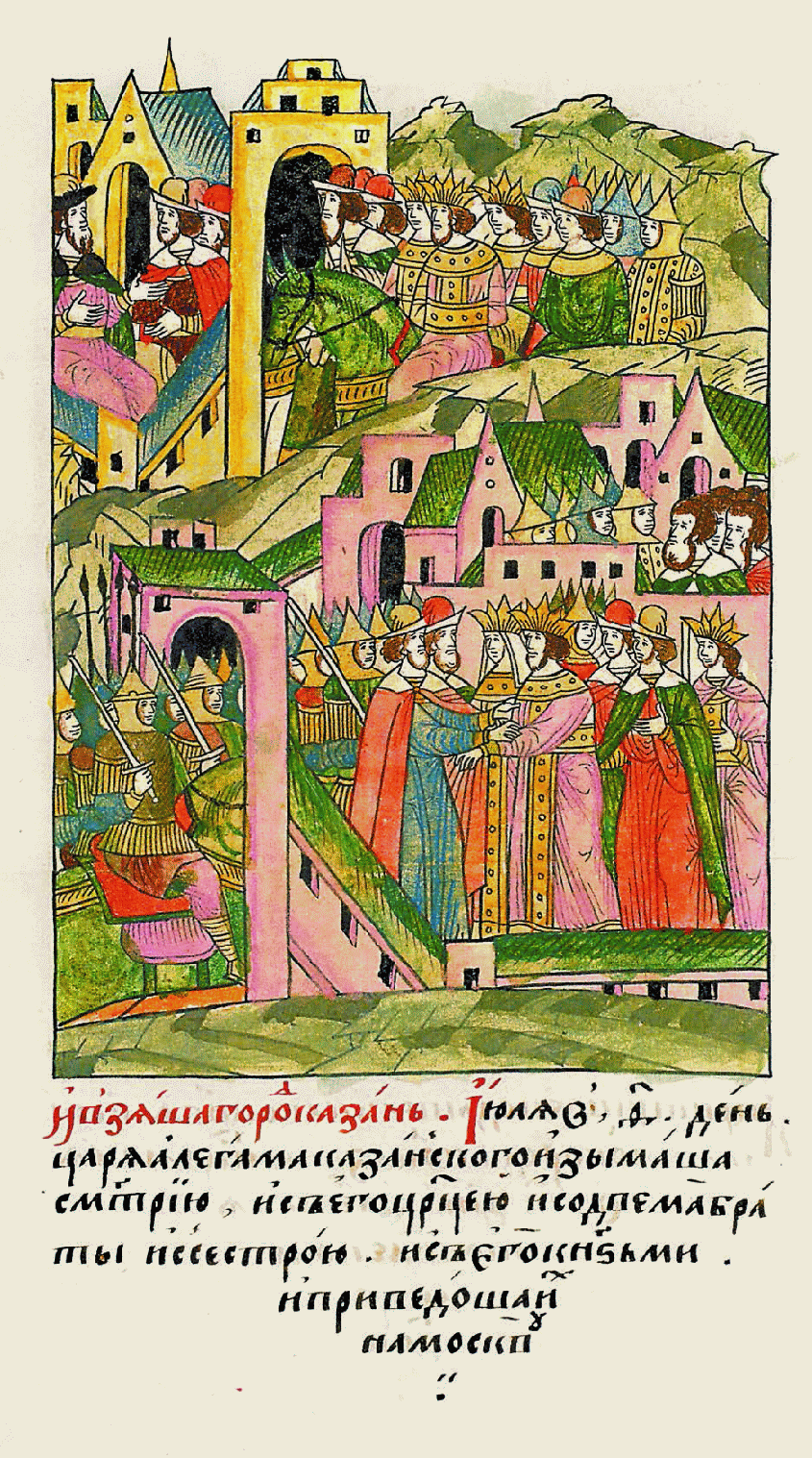
- The capture of Kazan on 9 July 1487. Depiction from the Illustrated Chronicle (1567).
Date	18 May – 9 July 1487
Location	Kazan, Khanate of Kazan (present-day Russia) 55°47′47″N 49°06′32″E
Result	Russian victory
Territorial changes	Kazan becomes a vassal of Muscovy

Belligerents
Grand Principality of Moscow	Khanate of Kazan

Commanders and leaders
Daniil Kholmsky; Ivan III of Russia; Möxämmädämin of Kazan	Ilham Ghali (surrendered)

The siege of Kazan (Note: Russian: Осада Казани, romanized: Osada Kazani) took place between 18 May and 9 July 1487, during a succession dispute for the Khanate of Kazan's throne. Troops from the Grand Principality of Moscow, which were commanded by Daniil Kholmsky, intended to capture its capital Kazan in order to restore the reign of Möxämmädämin.

The Khanate of Kazan was one of the strongest fragments of the Golden Horde, and was located in close proximity to the Russian principalities. The first wars began during the civil war in Moscow, where the Tatars were able to reach the capital, but then retreated. In the war of 1469–1478, the Russians moved the war to the territory of the khanate, and even reached the outskirts of the capital, but could not take it, while the Tatars made concessions. In 1487, the main goal of the campaign was the direct capture of Kazan. After a quick march and several victorious skirmishes, they successfully besieged the city and forced its garrison to surrender. After the war, Kazan became completely dependent for a while, but as a result of new conflicts it regained sovereignty, conflicts continued regularly until the last siege by Ivan the Terrible.

== Background ==
=== Leading conflicts ===
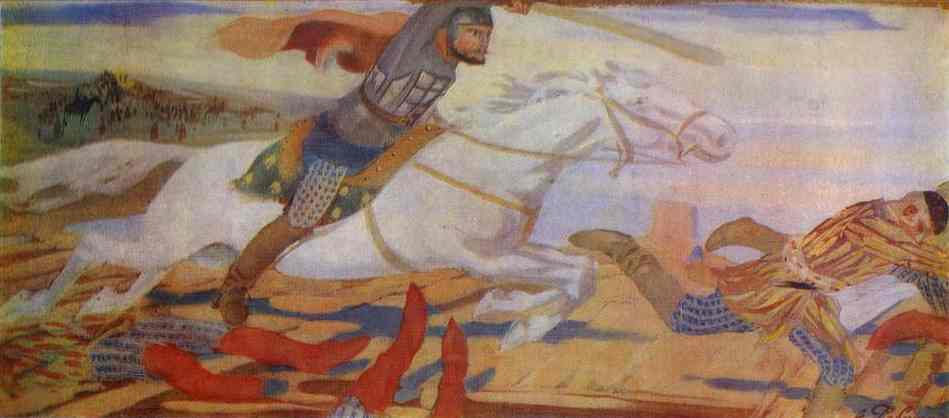
Prince Ukhtomsky pursues the defeated Tatars, 1469 painting by Andrei Ryabushkin

In the 1430s, the Khanate of Kazan emerged on the mid-Volga, breaking away from the Golden Horde, and roughly comprising the area of former Volga Bulgaria. The Russo-Kazan conflicts began in 1437, when the skirmish at Belyov took place, the outcome of which has been discussed among historians. (Note: Gumilev (1992) regarded it as a Russian victory, while Zimin (1991) concluded it was a Tatar victory.) Kazan khan Ulugh Muhammad could not let the Muscovite attack on him stand, so two years later, he launched an operation against Moscow. During the 10-day-long siege, he plundered the surroundings and the city of Kolomna, but did not take Moscow itself and withdrew. After a 6-year truce, fighting resumed again when the new ruler of Kazan Mäxmüd took Nizhny Novgorod. Vasily II gathered an army and defeated the Tatars near Murom, but subsequently suffered a crushing defeat in the Battle of Suzdal (1445), where his troops numbering less than 1,000 were defeated by a corps of Tatars with 3,500 warriors. He was captured. Most of the then Moscow aristocracy was captured or killed.

=== Crises in the Khanate ===
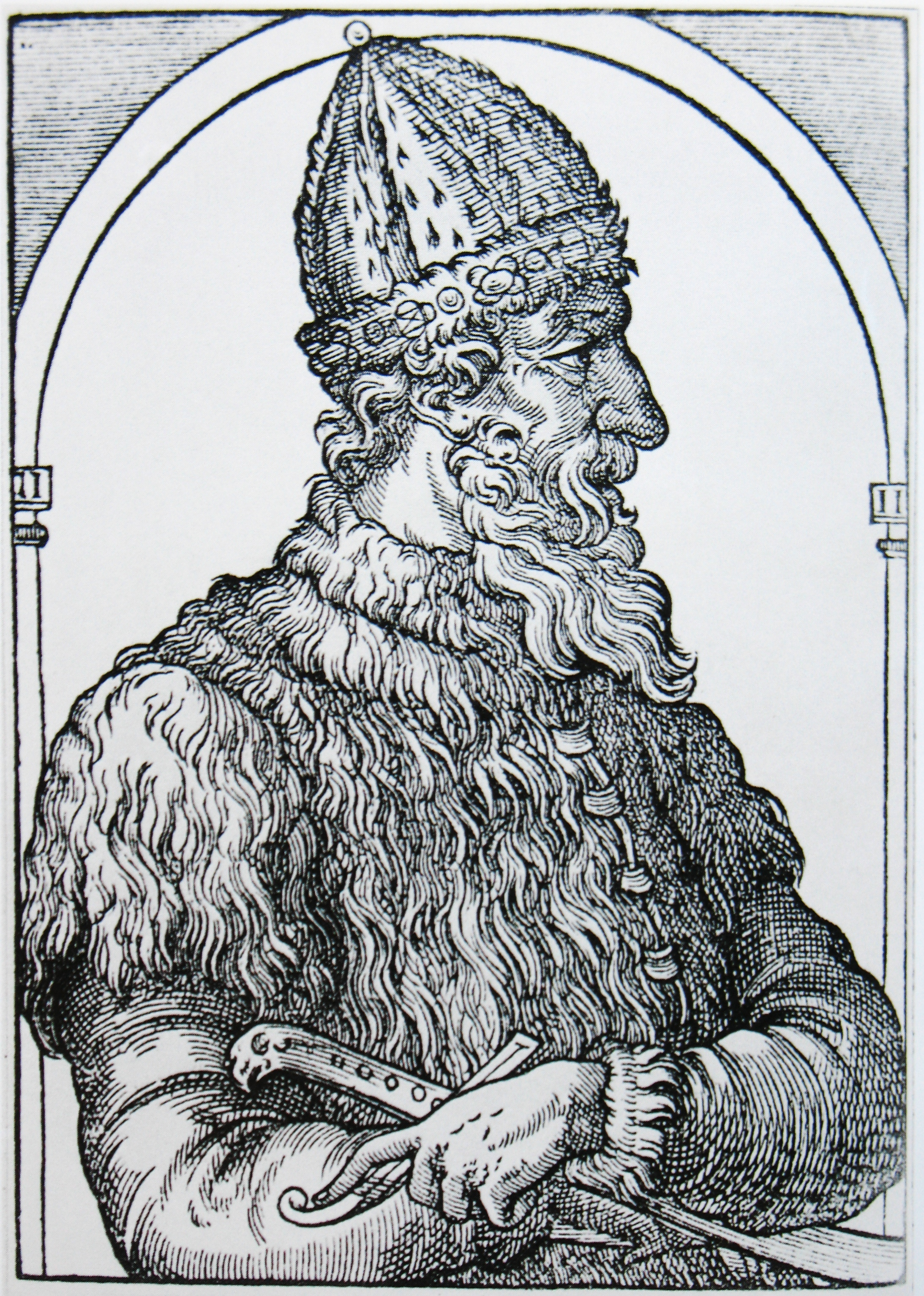
Ivan III of Russia, the Grand Duke of Moscow who tried to support Möxämmädämin on the throne and staged an intervention in Kazan

A succession crisis erupted in Kazan following the death of Khan Mäxmüd (Mahmutek) in 1466 or 1467, as both his brother Qasim and his son Ibrahim had wished to succeed him. Mäxmüd's widow travelled to Muscovy, where she married her deceased husband's brother Qasim in accordance with Muslim tradition. Ivan III staged a campaign near Kazan, but the city was not stormed; the defenders only surrendered after the city's water supply was cut off. Around the same time, the Russians won a major victory in the Battle of Zvenichiv Bor (1468). The 1467–1469 war ended in Muscovy's favour. Nevertheless, Ivan didn't succeed in placing his candidate Qasim on the Kazan throne.

The main reason for new war was another succession crisis in Kazan. For several years, Khan Ilham and Möxämmädämin succeeded each other, but the former soon won the victory. His policy was directed against Russia and was based on an alliance with Great Horde. Concerned by these circumstances, Moscow urgently mobilized forces and started a war.

== Siege ==
=== Preparation ===
For the war, the Russians gathered significant forces, they were distributed by titular regiment as follows:

Russian army	Army Commander	Advanced regiment	Right-hand regiment	Left-hand regiment	Cavalry
Generals	Daniil Kholmsky	Semyon Ryapolovsky	Alexander Obelensky	Semyon Yaroslavsky	Fyodor Khripun

Formally, Ivan Vasilyevich was the commander, but he did not take part directly.

=== Military operations ===
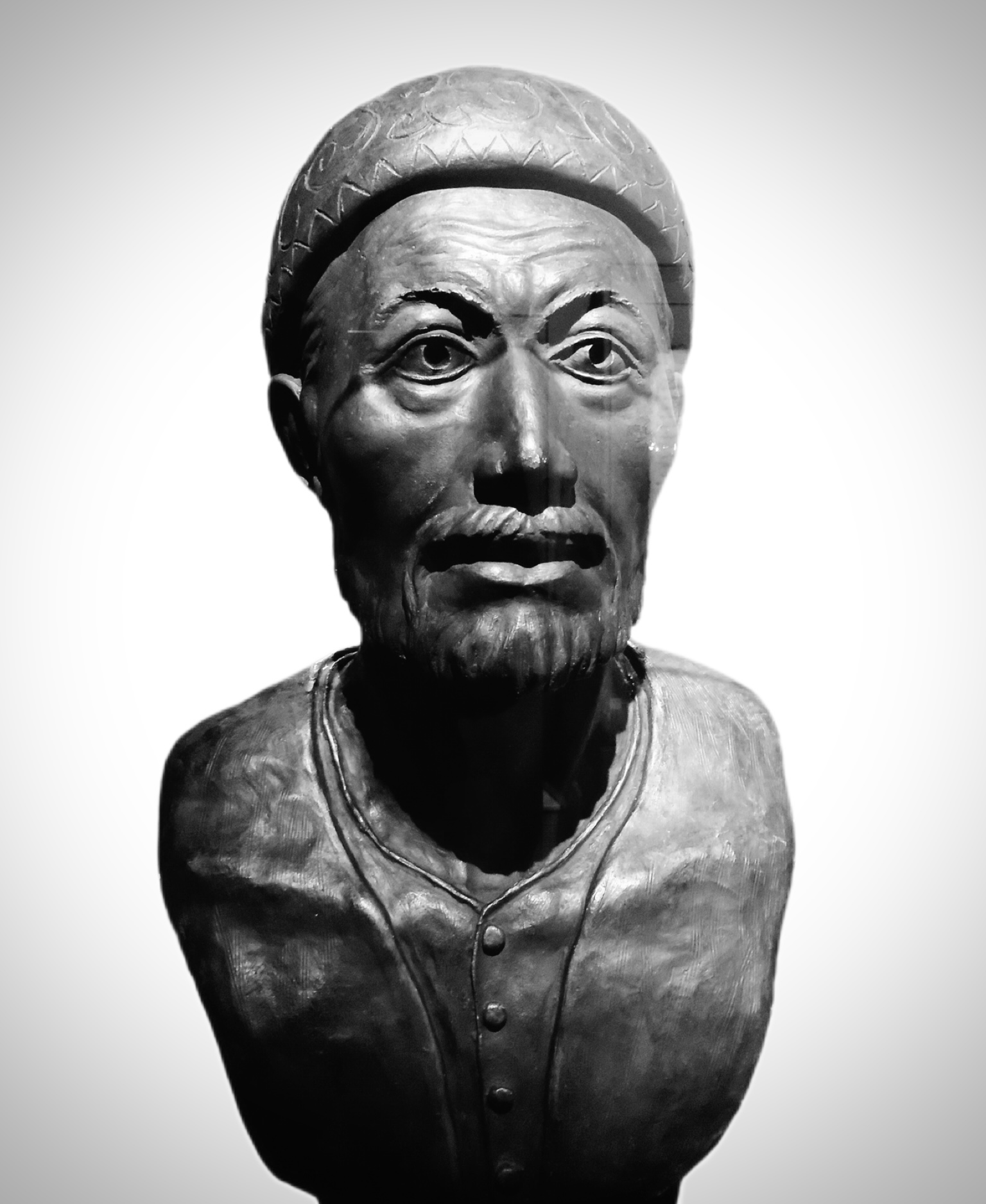
Möxämmädämin of Kazan, The deposed ruler of Kazan

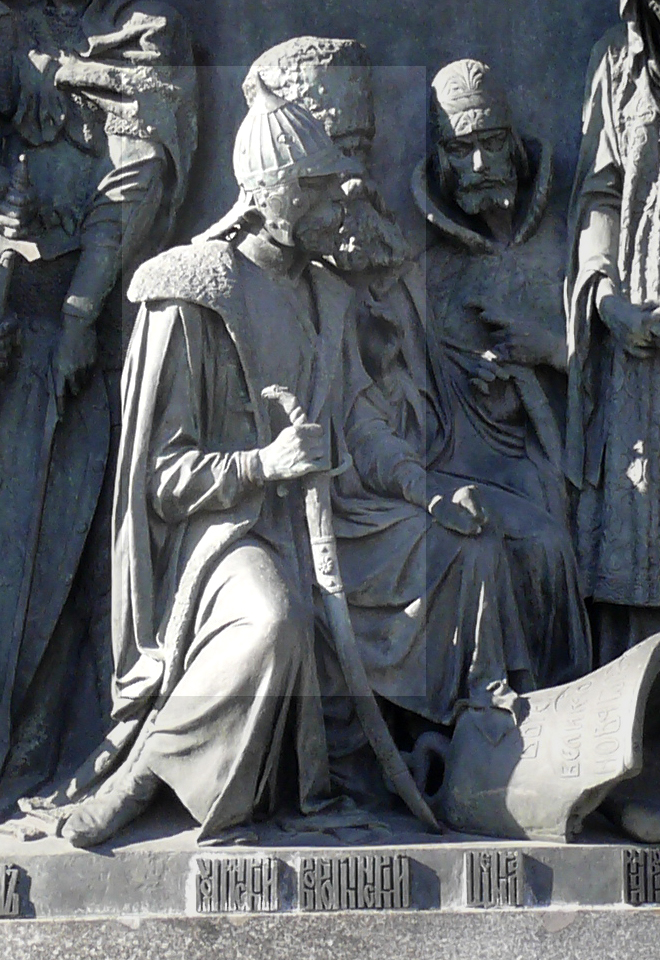
Knyaz Daniil Kholmsky, who commanded all the troops during the war. Sculpture from the Millennium of Russia monument

The Muscovite army moved out on 11 April (or 12 April, according to other sources) from Nizhny Novgorod. The flotilla on the Volga was moving along with the ground army at an average daily speed of 30 kilometers. In parallel, the Tatars decided to immediately stop the Russian offensive, preventing a siege. On the river Sviyaga a general battle took place, the details of which are unknown, but the Russians remained victorious. On 18 May, the Muscovites approached the outskirts of the city. The Ali-Gaza corps of Kazan was initially successful in obstructing the Muscovite siege preparations; its raids inflicted heavy losses on the Russians, but nevertheless, the corps was defeated.

After that, a slow and systematic siege began, sorties from the city were fought off and demoralisation began in the city among the garrison and residents. On 9 July, Kazan surrendered. Khan Ilham, his children and his wife were captured, and the khanate became dependent on Russia. The whole capital rejoiced at the arrival of such a noble prisoner, subsequently the Tatars were kept prisoners in the Moscow Kremlin. This time, Ivan III achieved a complete victory over his enemy on the first attempt, creating a single state, and skillfully managing its resources, he snatched the initiative from Kazan's hands, as well as the success was affected by the fact that two Russian armies successfully interacted with each other and fought off active Tatar raids.

== Outcome ==
With the restoration of Möxämmädämin to the throne, the vassalage of the Khanate of Kazan to Muscovy resumed, lasting until 1496. In Tatar historiography, this time came to be known as the quiet decade. Ivan III widely celebrated the victory: parades and bells were played in Moscow to mark the occasion. Ivan considered the capture of khan Ilham Ghali of Kazan retribution for the capture of his father 42 years ago. At the end of the war, Ivan also assumed the title of Lord of Volga Bulgaria. Later, the troops of the Kazan Khanate belonged to the Russian ruler and went on campaigns at his request.

== Bibliography ==
- Alexeev, Yuri (2009). "Походы 1480-х" [Campaigns of the 1480s]. Походы русских войск при Иване III [Campaigns of Russian troops under Ivan III] (in Russian). St. Petersburg University Press. ISBN 978-5-288-04840-1.
- Alisheiv, Salaam (1995). Казань и Москва: межгосударственные отношения в XV—XVI вв. [Kazan and Moscow: interstate relations in the XV—XVI centuries] (in Russian). Kazan: Tatar book edition. ISBN 5-298-00564-0.
- Borisov, Nikolai (2006). Иван III [Ivan III] (in Russian). Серия: Жизнь замечательных людей. Moscow: Молодая гвардия. ISBN 5-235-02950-X.
- Gumilev, Lev (2023) [1992]. От Руси к России [From Rus' to Russia]. Эксклюзивная классика (revised ed.). Moscow: AST. ISBN 978-5-17-153845-3.
- Karamzin, Nikolay (2023). История государства Российского [History of the Russian State] (in Russian). Moscow: Russian imperial library press. ISBN 978-5-699-25867-3.
  - Том VI, Глава IV: Продолжение государствования Иоаннова. 1480–1490. (Volume VI, Chapter IV: continuation of Ivan's reign, 1480–1490).
- Khudyakov, Michail (2012) [1991]. Очерк истории Казанского ханства [An essay on the history of the Kazan Khanate] (in Russian). Yekaterinburg: Инсан. ISBN 978-5-85840-253-4.
- Martin, Janet (2006). "The emergence of Moscow (1359–1462)". In Perrie, Maureen (ed.). The Cambridge History of Russia. Volume 1. From Early Rus' to 1689. Cambridge: Cambridge University Press. ISBN 978-1-139-05410-2. OCLC 828740214.
- Martin, Janet (2007). Medieval Russia: 980–1584. Second Edition. E-book. Cambridge: Cambridge University Press. ISBN 978-0-511-36800-4.
- Pchelov, Evgeniy (2004). Монархи России [The Monarchs of Russia] (in Russian). Moscow: Олма-Пресс. ISBN 5-224-04343-3.
- Russian Military Historical Society (2014). "Ivan III". Цари-Полководцы [Tsars-generals] (in Russian). Komsomolskaya Pravda. ISBN 978-5-87107-869-3.
- Wolkov, Vladimir (2016). Под стягом Москвы [Under Moscow banner] (in Russian). Прометей.
- Zimin, Aleksandr (1991). Витязь на распутье. Феодальная война в России XV в. [The Knight at the Crossroads. The feudal war in Russia of the 15th century]. Moscow: Мысль. ISBN 5-244-00518-9.
- Penskoi, Vitaly (2021). "Центурионы" Ивана Грозного: Воеводы и головы Московского войска второй половины XVI века ["Centurions" of Ivan the Terrible: Voivodes and Heads of the Moscow army of the second half of the XVI century] (in Russian). Series: Новейшие исследования по истории России [The latest research on the history of Russia]. Moscow: Центрополиграф. ISBN 978-5-227-09581-7.
