= Ibrahim of Kazan =

Khan of the Kazan Khanate from 1467 to 1479

- Khan of Kazan

Khan of the Tatar Kazan Khanate
- Reign: 1467 – 1479
- Predecessor: Xälil of Kazan
- Successor: Ilham Ghali of Kazan
- Born: 15th century
- Died: 1479 or c. 1486
- Spouses: Fatima Sultan; Nur Sultan
- Issue: by Fatima; Ilham Ghali of Kazan by Nur; Möxämmädämin of Kazan; Ghabdellatif of Kazan; Gawharshat of Kazan
- Religion: Islam

Ibrahim Khan (Volga Türki and Persian: ابراهیم خان; died 1479 or c. 1486) was the Khan of Kazan from 1467. He was the son of Mäxmüd. He was crowned after Xälil's death and was married to Nur Sultan. In 1467–1469 and 1478, he participated in wars against Muscovy. After concluding a treaty with Ivan III, all Russian prisoners of war held by the Khanate were released. He supported a policy of non-intervention into Muscovy's politics.

== Wars against Muscovy ==
In 1467, Ivan III began to wage war against the Kazan Khanate. In the fall, he sent as a pretender Oglan Kasim, Ibrahim's uncle, who was supported by some of the Kazan nobility. Ibrahim destroyed numerous Muscovite forces in the battle on the Idel (Volga).

At the head of opposition was mirza Gabgul-Mumin. The Russian campaign ended unsuccessfully, with the Russian army deciding to not cross the Volga to engage in combat with the Tatars. In response to this Ibrahim-khan in winter made a dragoon to the border areas of the enemy and plundered the environs of Galich Merskoy.

In 1468, Ivan III sent strong garrisons to Nizhniy Novgorod, Murom, Kostroma, Galich and began military action on the territory of Khanate. This campaign accompanied by extreme violence against ordinary people with the purpose of provoking Kazan into a big war.

Ibrahim sent its armies by two directions: Galich and Nizhniy Novgorod-Muromsk. On the first way, the Khanate's army was contributed by success. Tatars captured the Kichmeng town and two volosts of Kostroma were occupied. On the second way Russians stopped Tatars defeating Khadzhi-Berdy's troop.

Muscovy opened a third front from Khlynov. The ushkuyniks went by boats to Kama from Vyatka and began robbing the hinterland of the Khanate (deep behind the lines). In response to this Tatars sent troops that captured the capital of Vyatka Land, Khlynov.

== Marriages and issue ==
Ibrahim had at least two wives, and by them he had at least three sons and a daughter:

- Fatima Sultan, Nogai princess. By her he had a son:
  - Ilham Ghali of Kazan. Kazan Khan.
- Nur Sultan, Nogai princess and widow of Ibrahim's later brother, Xälil. By her he had two sons and a daughter:
  - Möxämmädämin of Kazan. Kazan Khan;
  - Ghabdellatif of Kazan. Kazan Khan;
  - Gawharshat of Kazan. Regent of Kazan during her son's underage.

== Bibliography ==
- Kołodziejczyk, Dariusz (2011). The Crimean Khanate and Poland-Lithuania: International Diplomacy on the European Periphery (15th-18th Century). A Study of Peace Treaties Followed by Annotated Documents. Leiden: Brill. ISBN 9789004191907. Archived from the original on 2017-06-30.
- Martin, Janet (2007). Medieval Russia: 980–1584. Second Edition. E-book. Cambridge: Cambridge University Press. ISBN 978-0-511-36800-4.

Preceded by Xälil	Khan of Kazan; 1467–1479	Succeeded by Ilham
