= List of Kazan khans =

List of Kazan khans who ruled the Khanate of Kazan before it was conquered by Russia. The First List has local spelling and dynasty. The Second List has very short biographies.

== First list ==
- Ghiyath-ud-din Khan taking advantage of the troubles of the Golden Horde established himself as an independent ruler of Kazan Ulus (Kazan district) during the 1420s. Eventually the former ruler of the Golden Horde, Ulugh Muhammad, would take over Kazan and establish his own separate Khanate of Kazan breaking the Golden Horde Empire.
- White rows signify independent khans.
  - Blue rows signify influence of Grand Duchy of Moscow.
    - Green row signifies brief interruption under Khan of Sibir Khanate.
      - Pink rows signify Qasim Khanate rule.
        - Yellow rows signify Giray dynasty from Crimean Khanate.
          - Brown row signifies prince from Khanate of Astrakhan rule.

Titular Name	Personal Name	Reign
Khan خان	Ulugh Muhammad الغ محمد	1438 - 1446 C.E.
Khan خان	Mäxmüd of Kazan محمود ابن الغ محمد	1445 – 1466 C.E.
Khan خان	Xälil of Kazan خلیل ابن محمود	1466 – 1467 C.E.
Khan خان	Ibrahim of Kazan ابراہیم ابن محمود	1467 – 1479 C.E.
Khan خان	Ilham Ghali of Kazan علی ابن ابراہیم	1479 – 1484 C.E. (1st reign)
Khan خان	Möxämmädämin of Kazan محمد امین ابن ابراہیم	1484 – 1485 C.E. (1st reign)
Khan خان	Ilham Ghali of Kazan علی ابن ابراہیم	1485 – 1487 C.E. (2nd reign)
Khan خان	Möxämmädämin of Kazan محمد امین ابن ابراہیم	1487 – 1495 C.E. (2nd reign)
Khan خان	Mamuq of Kazan ?	1495 – 1496 C.E.
Khan خان	Ghabdellatif of Kazan عبد اللطیف ابن ابراہیم	1496 – 1502 C.E.
Khan خان	Möxämmädämin of Kazan محمد امین ابن ابراہیم	1502 - 1518 C.E. (3rd reign)
Khan خان	Shahghali شاہ علی ابن شیخ اللہ یار	1518 - 1521 C.E. (1st reign)
Khan خان	Sahib I Giray صاحب غرائی	1521 - 1525 C.E.
Khan خان	Safa Giray of Kazan صفا غرائی	1525 - 1532 C.E. (1st reign)
Khan خان	Canghali of Kazan جان علی ابن شیخ اللہ یار	1532 – 1535 C.E.
Khan خان	Safa Giray of Kazan صفا غرائی	1535 – 1546 C.E. (2nd reign)
Khan خان	Shahghali شاہ علی ابن شیخ اللہ یار	1546 C.E. (2nd reign)
Khan خان	Safa Giray of Kazan صفا غرائی	1546 - 1549 C.E. (3rd reign)
Khan خان	Devlet I Giray دولت كراى; Pretender, appointed by the Ottoman Empire	1549 – 1551 C.E.
Khan خان	Utameshgaray of Kazan عتمش غرائی; Utemish being a minor the actual ruler was his mother Söyembikä who acted as regent	1549 – 1551 C.E.
Khan خان	Shahghali شاہ علی ابن شیخ اللہ یار	1551 – 1552 C.E. (3rd reign)
Khan خان	Yadegar Mokhammad of Kazan یاد گار محمد	1552 C.E.
Ivan the Terrible, the Tsar of Russia conquers Khanate of Kazan in 1552 C.E.

== Second list with short biographies ==
This information comes from Howorth's 1880 book and is checked against the Russian Wikipedia. There appears to be no modern book in English on the history of the khanate. Abbreviations on khan-numbers: R=pro-Russian, A=anti-Russian.

- 0. Before the Khanate the area had been part of Volga Bulgaria and then the Bulgar Ulus of the Golden Horde.
- 1A. Ulugh Muhammad 1438-1456 was twice Khan of the Golden Horde. Driven out in 1436, fled to Crimea, quarreled with the Crimeans, led a 3000-man army north and took the border town of Belyov. In 1437 Vasily II sent 40000 men against him, who were defeated. In the same year he moved to the Volga and in 1438 captured Kazan and separated it from the Golden horde. 1439 took Nizhny Novgorod and burned outskirts of Moscow. In 1444-45 he occupied Nizhny Novgorod and marched on Murom and raided Ryazan. When Vasily counterattacked (1445) he was defeated and captured at the Battle of Suzdal, but soon ransomed. Muhammad died in the fall of 1445, possibly murdered by his son Mamudek, below. His son Qasim Khan went to collect ransom after the battle of Suzdal, entered Russian service and in 1452 founded the Qasim Khanate.
- 2. Mäxmüd of Kazan or Mamudek 1445-66 son of above. Long and peaceful reign in which the Khanate was stabilized and enriched. Howorth has him kill an Ali Beg who had usurped power. 1444 raided Veliky Ustug far to the northwest. Commander at battle of Suzdal, above. 1448 Russians drove his army out of Vladmir and Murom.
- 3. Xälil of Kazan 1466-67 son of above, short reign, little information.
- 4A. Ibrahim of Kazan 1467-79 brother of above. Married his brother's widow (#X below). When he came to the throne Russia and a local faction tried to impose his uncle Qasim Khan, above. After several failures in 1469 the Russians surrounded Kazan and cut off its water supply. Peace was made and Kazan released a large number of captives. In 1478 Ibrahim raided Russia. Next year Ivan reached Kazan and withdrew. Ibrahim died soon after.
- 5A. Ilham 1479–84, 1485-87 Son of above by first wife. 1482 Russian war plan stopped by treaty. 1484 Russia imposed #6, 1485 Ilham restored by local faction with Russian support. 1487 deposed after Russian siege, exiled to Vologda.
- 6R. 1st and 2nd Muhammed Amin 1484–85, 1487–95. Son of #4 and #X, half-brother of #5. 1st reign: 1484 at about age 15 enthroned by Russians replacing Ilham, next year replaced by Ilham. 2nd reign: 1487 restored by Russia. 1491 Kazan, Moscow, Crimea and Nogais fought the Great Horde. 1495 replaced by #7, fled to Russia and given fief, fought Lithuania. 3rd reign: see #9
- 7. Mamuk 1495-96 was khan of Sibir (probably), invited in by a faction, Russia sent army to protect #6, Mamuk driven off by another faction, when Russian army left he took Kazan with Nogai support. Unpopular, after returning from a raid on Arsk the city gates were closed to him and he went back to Sibir, dying en route.
- 8R. Abdul Latif or Ghabdellatif of Kazan 1497-1502 brother of #6, son of #4 and #X. 1479 went to Crimea with his mother, 1490 fief in Russia. 1496 Kazan asked for him instead of #6. 1499 Agalak(#7's brother) and Uraq failed to take Kazan. Grew unpopular, 1502 faction and Russia replaced him with #6, exiled to Beloozersk, 1516 released, 1517 died.
- 9RA. 3rd Muhammed Amin 1502–18. See #6 for first and second reigns. Married widow of #5. In 1505, incited by his wife, he robbed, killed or captured the Russian merchants in his domain and sent his troops and Nogais to burn the suburbs of Nizhny Novgorod, which was saved by 300 released Lithuanian POWs. Nogais split with Kazan and the siege was raised. During the Russo-Kazan War (1505-07) two armies went to Kazan. One went down the Volga and was defeated near Kazan. A second army arrived from a different direction, almost won, fell to looting and was destroyed. The matter was settled and Kazan gave up its prisoners. 1510 #X went to Moscow and Kazan and arranged some degree of peace.
- 10R. 1st Shah Ali 1518-21 The house of #1 having died out, Crimea wanted #11, but Russia imposed the Kasim khan Shah Ali. He is described as fat and physically repulsive and unpopular as a Russian puppet. #11 was invited and took over with no trouble and #10 returned to Russia.
- 11A. Sahib I Giray 1521-25 younger brother of Crimean khan Mehmed I Giray. 1510 accompanied his step-mother #X to Moscow. His 1521 accession meant war with Russia, so that year Kazan and Crimea raided Muscovy and took a huge number of prisoners. 1522 raided eastern Muscovy. 1523 Russian army under #10 reached Kazan but turned back and Kazan failed to take Galich. 1524 lost Crimean support for uncertain reasons, declared himself a Turkish vassal without result and at the approach of a huge Russian army, fled. Later became Khan of Crimea (1532–51).
- 12A 1st Safa Giray of Kazan 1525-32: Their khan having fled, the patriotic faction placed his 13-year-old nephew on the throne. The Russian siege was unsuccessful and they withdrew. In 1530 another Russian army was sent and burned much of Kazan, besieged what was left and then made a truce. A Kazan faction replaced him with #13.
- 13R. Jan Ali 1532-35 Seeking a pro-Russian khan and fearing #10 they chose his brother who was then the Qasim Khan. Recognized Russian suzerainty and dominated by a faction under #Z below, 1533 married Suyumbeke #Y (below), deposed and either killed or exiled to Old Kazan (sources differ). During his reign the future conquer of Kazan, Ivan the Terrible, came to the throne at the age of three.
- 14A. 2nd Safa Giray 1536-46 see #12. Recalled from Crimea, married #Y, a faction wanted #10, after failed Russian attack, Tatars plundered Nizhny Novgorod region. 1538 raided Muscovy, withdrew and made peace acknowledging Russian suzerainty. 1540 raided Murom with Crimeans and Nogais, 1546 Russians raided near Kazan and withdrew, same year deposed by faction.,
- 15R. 2nd Shah Ali 1546 see #10, installed by pro-Russian faction, saw that the other faction was more powerful and began to fear for his life. The story goes that he held a banquet, got everyone drunk and slipped out of the palace before anyone knew he was gone.
- 16A. 3rd Safa Giray 1546-49 see #12, #14. Had fled to his Nogai father-in-law Yusuf, returned with a Nogai army, but Shah Ali's flight made the army unnecessary. Leaders of Russian faction fled to Russia, minor Russian raid. 1547 Ivan the Terrible in person led army east, but unusual warm winter made roads and rivers impassible, so army withdrew. According to one story he died by falling against a pillar when drunk.
- 17A. Utamesh Giray of Kazan 1549-51 son of #16 and Suyunbeka (#Y below). Enthroned at age 2 with his mother as regent. In 1549 Ivan the Terrible sent an army planning to reinstall #15, Kazan was surrounded, an assault failed and a thaw made the roads impassible and forced withdrawal. They withdrew 29 kilometres (18 mi) west and built a fort at Sviyazhsk. A faction sought peace and delivered Utamesh and his mother to the Russians. Utamesh was baptized, fought the Lithuanians and died at the age of 20. His mother was then married to Shah Ali #15.
- 18R. 3rd Shah Ali 1551-52 see #15. The pro-Russian Shah Ali was placed on the throne and 60000 Russian captives released. Russia annexed land west of the Volga, which weakened the khanate and was opposed by even Shah Ali. He killed many of his enemies at a banquet, which made things worse. Ivan wanted him deposed and he fled the town for a third time.
- 19A. Yadegar Mokhammad of Kazan 1552. 1552 patriotic faction closed gates to Russians, called in Yadigar. For the Russian conquest see Siege of Kazan. Yadigar was the son of Qasim II of Astrakhan, 1542 in Russian service, 1550/51 fought Kazan, then joined Nogais, 1552 called to Kazan, survived the defeat, 1553 baptized, given Zvenigorod, fought in Livonian War, died in 1565.
- 20A?. Ali Akram c1552-56. The rebels who continued to resist in the countryside brought in a Nogai named Ali Akram. He was unsuccessful and was killed by the rebels.
- X. Nur-Sultan (ru:Нур-Султан): daughter of Timur, a Nogai beg, wife of #3, second wife of #4, at his death went to Crimea, 1486 married Crimean Khan Meñli I Giray. 1494-95 made Hajj, 1510-11 visited Moscow and Kazan, helped with treaty. #6 and #8 were her sons, #11 her stepson and #Z her daughter.
- Y. Söyembikä of Kazan daughter of Nogai beg Yosuf, 1533 at age 12 married to Jan Ali #13, circa 1536 became fifth wife of Safa Giray #14 who had deposed #13, 1549 after #14's death regent for his 2-year-old son #17, 1551 faction gave her and her son to Russians, year and a half later married against her will to #18, apparently after he had been expelled from Kazan, died in Kasimov.
- Z. Gaukharshad (ru:Гаухаршад) daughter of Ibraham #4 and #X, sister of #6 and #8. Involved in 1532 coup against Safa Giray #12 and became regent for Jan Ali #13 who married #Y. After #13 lost power in 1535 active in politics for another 10 years.
