= Xälil of Kazan =

Khan of the Kazan Khanate from 1466 to 1467

Xälil

Khan of the Tatar Kazan Khanate
- Reign: 1466–1467
- Predecessor: Mäxmüd of Kazan
- Successor: Ibrahim of Kazan
- Died: 1467
- Burial: Khan's mausoleum, Kazan Kremlin
- Spouse: Nur-Sultan bint Nogai Timur
- Father: Mäxmüd of Kazan
- Religion: Islam

Xalil (Volga Türki and Persian: خلیل; Tatar: Халил; pronounced [xæˈlil]; died 1467) was Khan of the Kazan Khanate from 1466 to 1467, but very little is known about him. He was the eldest son of Khan Maxmud (Mahmudek, Mäxmüd) and grandson of the first Khan of Kazan, Ulugh Muhammad. He spent his life entirely in Kazan. He ascended to the throne after his father's death. He was succeeded by his brother Ibrahim.

== Reign ==

Xälil continued his father's policy of the construction of Kazan cities. Xälil was considered as an explosive and aggressive ruler. He was known for breaking the treaty with Grand Prince Ivan III and poor relations with the Nogais. He later re-established ties with the Nogais upon marriage with Nur Sultan, daughter of Nogai Timur Mirza.

In Russian chronicles, the name Xälil is not mentioned at all. However, his name is mentioned in the work of the traveler of the 16th-century Sigismund von Herberstein diplomat, Notes on Muscovite Affairs (Rerum Moscoviticarum Commentarii). Also, Karl Fuchs in his work of 1817, using the ancient Tatar list of Kazan khans, mentions the name Xälil. Hadi Atlasi in his works, stated:

"There is no doubt that between Mahmud Khan and Ibrahim Khan was Khalil."

The same information can be found in the works of Şihabetdin Märcani.

The young Khan was married to the daughter of Nogai Timur, Nur-Sultan who was from the Nogais. The marriage ended without an heir because Xälil died the following year.

== Death ==
After his death in 1467, Nur-Sultan married Xälil's younger brother and heir Ibrahim. She gave birth to Ibrahim's sons and future Khans: Möxämmädämin (r. 1484–1485, 1487–1495, 1502–1518) and Ghabdellatif (r. 1496-1502). After Ibrahim died in 1479, Nur-Sultan married the Crimean Khan Meñli I Giray, her third husband.

According to one version, Xälil died in prison, where he had ended up due to fresh hostilities between the Kazan Khanate and the Golden Horde.

Xälil was buried in the Khan's Mausoleum in the Kazan Kremlin.

== See also ==
- List of Kazan khans

== Bibliography ==
- Howorth, Henry Hoyle. "History of the Mongols, from the 9th to the 19th Century. Part II, division I". The so-called tartars of Russia and Central Asia. Londres: Longmans, Green and Co, 1880.
- M. G. Khudyakov: Essays on the History of Kazan Khanate
- Xälil Xan.

Preceded by Maxmud	Khan of Kazan Khanate; 1466 – 1467	Succeeded by Ibrahim
