= O with left notch =

Cyrillic letter

Usage
- Writing system: Cyrillic
- Type: Alphabetic
- Sound values: [ø̝], [ʏ̞], [ɵ]

O with left notch is a letter of the Cyrillic script. It was used in Mstislav Aleksandrovich Kulayev's Bashkir alphabet. Its form was derived from the Cyrillic letter O with the addition of a left notch. This letter is similar to the Volapük letter Oe, but it has not been added into Unicode as a character.

== Encoding and replacements ==
This letter has not yet been encoded in Unicode. It is possible to use similar characters as a replacement such as the Volapük Latin letter ꞝ or the historic IPA symbol ʚ (not to be confused with the currently used IPA symbol ɞ). The Volapük letter is a more practical replacement as it also has an uppercase form Ꞝ.
