= Russo-Kazan War (1505–1507) =

Russo–Kazan War (1505–1507)
Date	6 September 1505 – 23 December 1507
Location	Principality of Moscow and Khanate of Kazan
Result	Indecisive: Peace treaty (signed 8 September 1507 in Moscow and 23 December 1507 in Kazan); Return of Muscovite prisoners
Territorial changes	Status quo ante bellum

Belligerents
Khanate of Kazan	Principality of Moscow

Commanders and leaders
Möxämmädämin of Kazan	Ivan III (1505); Vasily III (1505–1507)

The Russo-Kazan War of 1505-07 was one of the Russo-Kazan Wars. It began when the Kazan khan robbed merchants from the Principality of Moscow at the annual fair in Kazan. The Tatars then invaded and besieged Nizhny Novgorod, but were repulsed. Moscow sent an army in response, which was defeated by the Tatars. The war concluded with a treaty in 1507. Peace lasted until 1521.

== Background ==
The Russo-Kazan War of 1505–1507 was a conflict between the Grand Duchy of Moscovite Rus' and the Khanate of Kazan. It began when Mohammad Amin, who had been installed on the Kazan throne by Moscow, broke his allegiance and launched attacks on Russian merchants.

== War ==
In June 1505, Mohammad Amin arrested the Muscovite ambassador in Kazan, and robbed some Muscovite merchants who had gathered there for an annual trade fair. The merchants who weren’t killed were either held for ransom or were sold into slavery. Expecting vengeance, Mohammad sent 40,000 Tatars and 20,000 Nogais against Nizhny Novgorod and Murom. During this time, the Muromian force seems to have been driven away for unknown reasons.Now alone, Nizhny Novgorod was short of troops. So, the commander freed and armed 300 prisoners from the Lithuanian War, offering them amnesty in exchange for their service. During this time, the Lithuanian archers drove back the combined Nogai-Kazan force, and were able to prevent the fort from falling into enemy hands. The Nogai chief, who was Mohammad’s brother-in-law, was killed. The two groups quarreled and the Nogais withdrew. The Tatars withdrew with their booty and the Muscovites chose not to pursue them.

The war intensified in 1506, with a series of skirmishes. Russian forces led by Prince Fyodor Belsky and Prince Vasily Kholmsky sent two armies against Kazan in a series of campaigns. Vasily III had just come to the throne. Despite early Russian defeats, they were victorious in a later battle at Arsk Field in June 1506. One army went down the Volga. On 22 May they attacked, not waiting for the second army. The Tatars cut off them off from their ships and defeated them. On 22 June, the second army unexpectedly appeared and slaughtered the Tatars. The Russians fell to looting, the Tatars counterattacked and most of the Russians were killed. (Note: Howorth, who seems to be following Karamzin, has the June attack occur during the Kazan fair with the Russians looting its goods. It is difficult to see why merchants would come to a fair when the previous year’s fair had been looted. He also reports a story from Herberstein, who has the Tatars deliberately abandon their camp and counter attack when the Russians began looting.)

== Aftermath ==
In March 1507 Mohammad sent an ambassador to Moscow offering to release the prisoners and make peace. Vasili, who was more concerned with Lithuania, accepted. The treaty was signed on 8 September in Moscow and 23 December in Kazan. Early in the following year, the prisoners were released except for those who had already been sold to Crimea or central Asia.

This conflict was one of the final chapters of the Russo-Kazan wars, which were part of a broader struggle for control over the Volga region. The Russo-Kazan War of 1505-1507 also highlighted the growing tensions within the region, leading to a prolonged period of instability in Kazan and influencing Moscow's future strategies in the area.

== Bibliography ==
- Henry Hoyle Howorth, History of the Mongols: Part 2, 1880, pp. 378–385.
- Martin, Janet (2007). Medieval Russia: 980–1584. Second Edition. E-book. Cambridge: Cambridge University Press. ISBN 978-0-511-36800-4.
