= Peter Obolensky =

Peter Vasilievich Obolensky (Russian: Пётр Васильевич Оболенский), nicknamed The Naked (Russian: Нагой) (birth date unknown – died 1510), was a Russian prince and boyar in the service of the Grand Princes of Moscow Ivan III and Vasili III.

Obolensky was the son of Vasili Ivanovich Obolensky ("The Cross-Eyed"), one of the many princes of the Obolensky family who served the princes of Moscow. He is described as a descendant of Saint Michael of Chernigov, and was the founder of the Nagois-Obolensky branch of the Obolenskys.

The first known mention of Obolensky is from 1469, when he participated in the Qasim War against the Khanate of Kazan, commanding Moscow militia. In 1476 he participated in Ivan III's campaign against Novgorod. In 1492 and 1493 he participated in the campaigns against Lithuania.

In 1495 or 1500 Obolensky was elevated to the nobility and in 1500 attended the wedding of Prince Vasily Kholmsky to the daughter of Ivan III, Feodosiya Ivanovna.

In 1501, Obolensky participated in the Battle of Vedrosha of the second Lithuanian war under the command of Daniil Shchenya.

In 1510, during Vasili III's campaign against Novgorod, Obolensky served as Vasili's deputy as governor of Moscow. He died that same year.
