= Siege of Moscow =

Siege of Moscow of sack of Moscow may refer to:

- Siege of Moscow (1238) – capture and sack of Moscow by the Mongols
- Siege of Moscow (1370) – unsuccessful siege of Moscow by the Lithuanians under Algirdas
- Siege of Moscow (1382) – successful; sacking of Moscow by Tokhtamysh and his Rus' allies
- Edigu's siege of Moscow – unsuccessful siege by the Golden Horde
- Siege of Moscow (1439) – unsuccessful siege by the Khanate of Kazan
- Siege of Moscow (1451) – unsuccessful siege by the Great Horde
- Crimean campaign to Russia (1591) – rout of the Crimean Tatar troops near Moscow
- Siege of Moscow (1606) – unsuccessful siege by rebels
- Siege of Moscow (1611) – Russians failed to recapture Moscow
- Siege of Moscow (1612) – Russians recaptured Moscow
- Siege of Moscow (1618) – unsuccessful siege by the Polish-Lithuanian-Cossack troops

== See also ==
- Battle of Moscow (disambiguation)
