= Safarovo =

Safarovo Сафарово
- Village
- Location within Bashkortostan Location within Russia
- Coordinates: 53°33′N 54°27′E
- Country: Russia
- Region: Bashkortostan
- District: Miyakinsky District
- Time zone: UTC+5:00

Safarovo (Russian: Сафарово; Bashkir: Сафар, Safar) is a rural locality (a village) in Yenebey-Ursayevsky Selsoviet, Miyakinsky District, Bashkortostan, Russia. The population was 288 as of 2010. There are 5 streets.

== Geography ==
Safarovo is located 36 km southwest of Kirgiz-Miyaki (the district's administrative centre) by road. Tuksanbayevo is the nearest rural locality.
