= Nur Sultan (wife of Mengli I Giray) =

Wife of Mengli I Giray (1451–1519)

- Khanbikeh of the Crimean Khanate
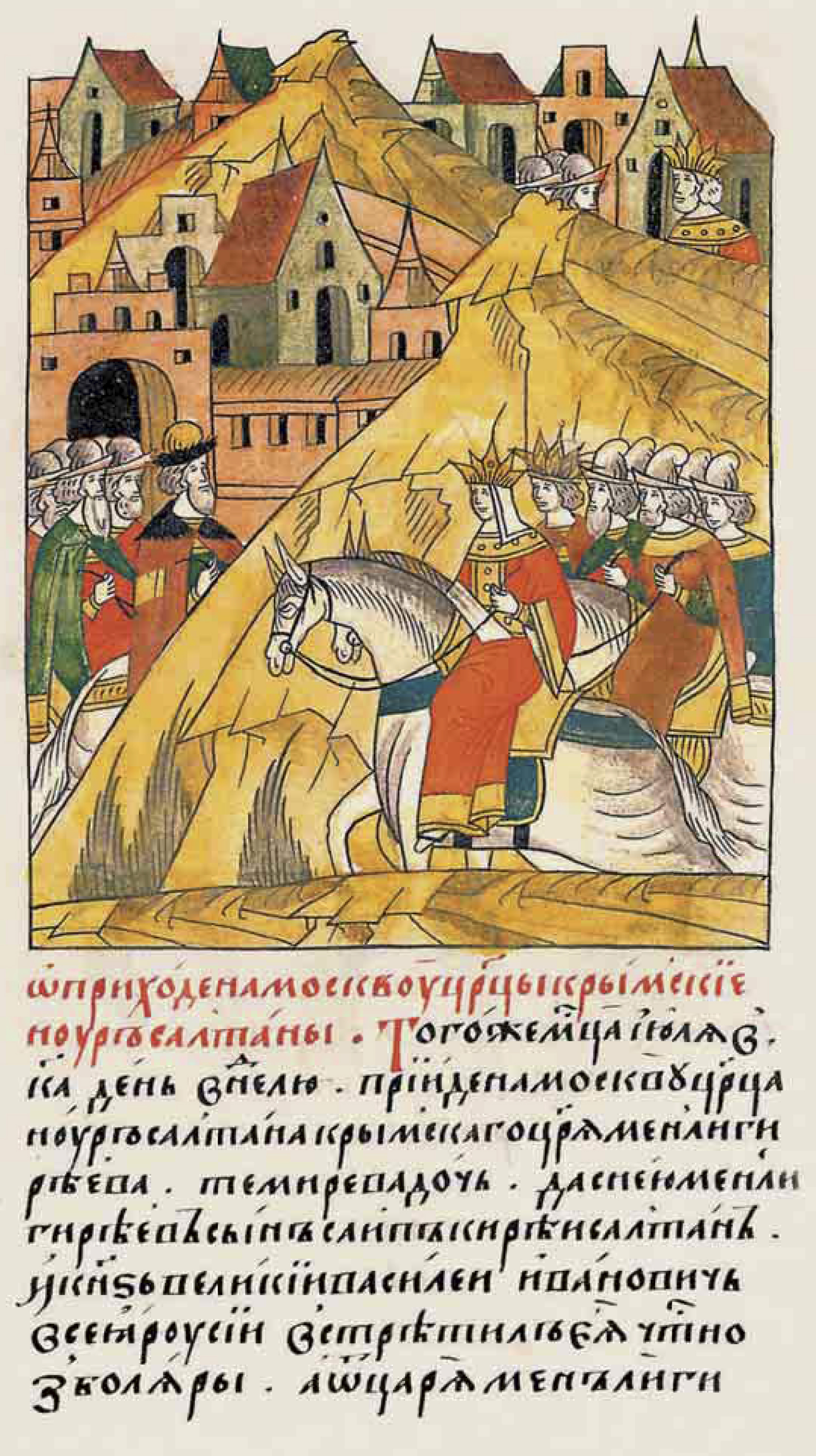
- Nur Sultan visiting Moscow, miniature from the Illustrated Chronicle of Ivan the Terrible
- Reign: 1487–1515
- Born: Nogai Nur bint Nogai Timur; 1451
- Died: 1519 (aged 67–68)
- Spouse: Xälil of Kazan (m. 1466; died 1467) Ibrahim of Kazan (m. 1467; died 1479) Menli I Giray (m. 1487; died 1515)
- Issue: by Ibrahim; Möxämmädämin of Kazan; Ghabdellatif of Kazan; Gawharshat of Kazan
- House: Nogai (birth); Kazan (marriage I and II); Giray (marriage III)
- Father: Nogai Timur Ibn Mansur
- Religion: Islam

Nur Sultan (1451–1519) was the wife of Mengli I Giray (r. 1467–1515). She was one of very few women known to have had influence over the affairs of state in the Crimean Khanate. She is also one of few well known women of the Giray dynasty.

== Life ==
She was the daughter of Prince Timur ibn Mansur, bey of the Manghits. She was the sister of Tevkel.

She first married khan Xälil of Kazan (r. 1466–1467). After his death, she married his brother Ibrahim of Kazan (r. 1467–1479). By Ibrahim she had two sons, Möxämmädämin of Kazan and Ghabdellatif of Kazan, and a daughter, Gawharshat. She supported the neutrality policy of her spouse against the more aggressive policy of her stepson Ilham Ghali. She was widowed when Ibrahim Khan died in 1479. Her spouse was succeeded by her stepson Ilham Ghali of Kazan. She left Kazan with her two sons and sought refuge with Ivan III of Moscow. Her brother Tevkel entered Crimean service in 1483.

In 1487, she married Mengli I Giray. The marriage was possibly made to give the Crimean khan an influential power base in the power struggle in post- Golden Horde Central Asia. She left for Bakhchisarai on the Crimea in the company of her youngest son Ghabdellatif, but left her eldest son in the custody Ivan of Moscow. She became one of the wives of Mengli I Giray. The women of the Giray dynasty, though an Islamic dynasty, did not yet live secluded in Giray harem, since until 1564 the royal women were still allowed to receive male visitors in audience. Nur Sultan herself never lived in seclusion.

Nur Sultan was highly politically involved from the start. She wished to support her son's right to the throne of Kazan in the power struggle against their halfbrother, her stepson. She wrote to Ivan III of Moscow and asked him to intervene in Kazan politics to defend the rights of her son, which gave Ivan III a reason to interfere in Kazan politics. Ivan III joined Mengli I Giray and launched a campaign on Kazan, which resulted in Muhammed Amin being placed on the throne of Kazan. However, the power struggle in Kazan continued, and Nur Sultan became a long term supporter of the alliance between Moscow and the Crimean Khanate on order to protect the interest of her son in Kazan.

In 1494–1495, she made a pilgrimage to Mecca with her brother, as well as Egypt. On her return, she gifted an Arab horse to her diplomatic ally Ivan III, who in return promised her that Kazan would always remain the property of her family.

In 1510–1511, Nur Sultan visited her sons in Moscow and Kazan in the company of her stepson Sahib I Giray. During her journey she signed a peace treaty between Crimean Khanate, Moscow and the Kazan Khanate.

Nur Sultan issued yarliqs (privileges, grants, orders and appointments, and messages addressed by the khans to their vassals) in her own name despite being a woman and not the reigning khan.

In 1515, her spouse died, and was succeeded by his son Mehmed I Giray.

She was one of few examples of the Giray harem who ever had any influence over the affairs of state, alongside Ayse Sultan, wife of Devlet I Giray (r. 1551–1577) and Emine Sultan Biyim, wife of Mehmed IV Giray (1642–44 and 1654–66), have been historically acknowledged as politically influential.

== Issue ==
By Ibrahim of Kazan, She had two sons and a daughter:

- Möxämmädämin of Kazan
- Ghabdellatif of Kazan
- Gawharshat of Kazan
