= Monument to Miftahetdin Akmulla =

Monument in Ufa, Russia

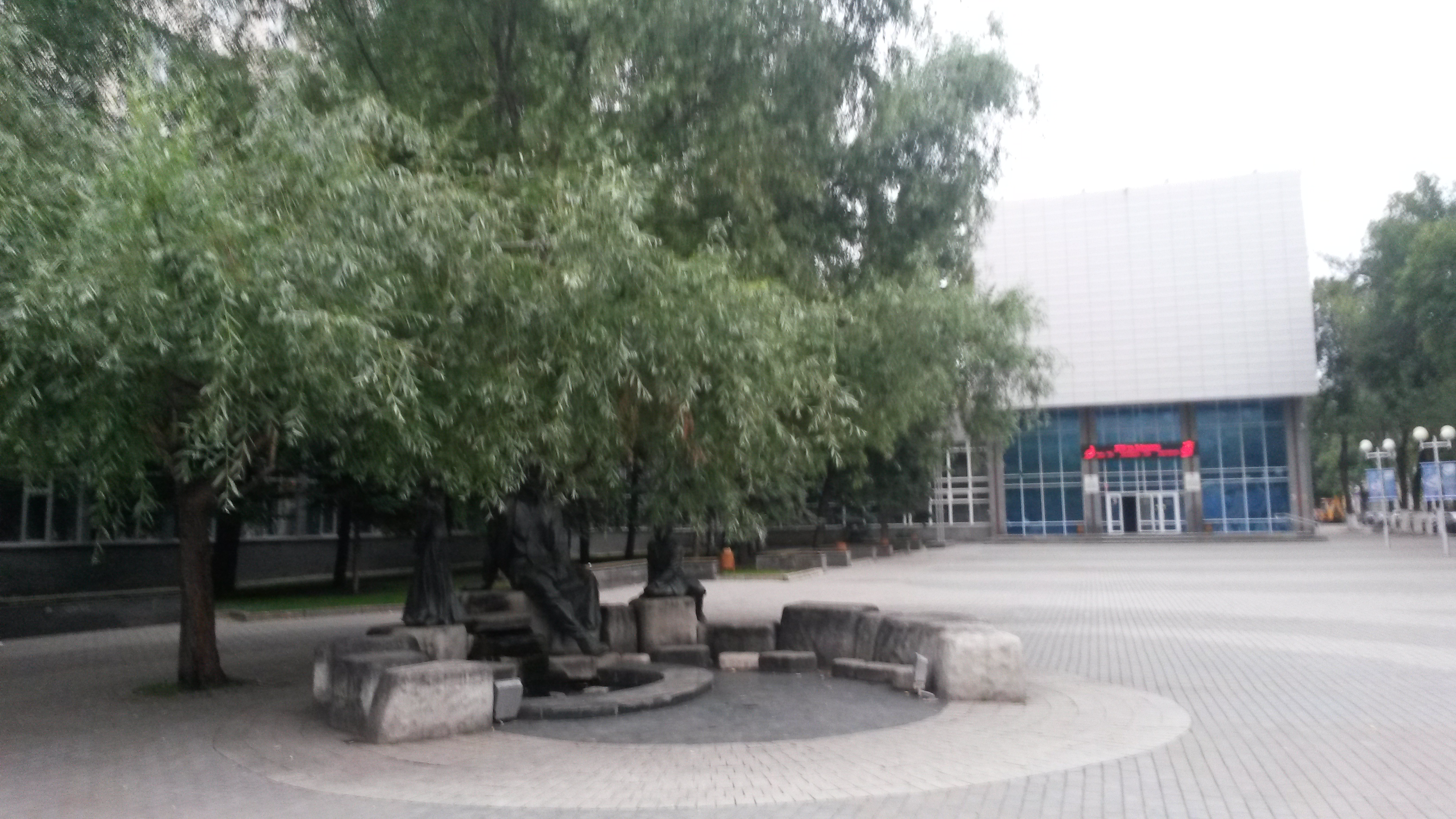
- Interactive map of Monument to Miftahetdin Akmulla
- Location: Bashkortostan, Ufa
- Coordinates: 54°43′17″N 55°56′01″E
- Opening date: 2008
- Dedicated to: Miftahetdin Akmulla

The Monument to Miftahetdin Akmulla, built in 2008, is a monument at Bashkir State Pedagogical University in Ufa, Bashkortostan. Opened in 2008.

== History ==
In 2006 a competition was announced dedicated to the 175th anniversary of the writer Miftahetdin Akmulla. The project of Damir Magafurov and Vladimir Dvornik won.

The bronze monument is located in the park opposite the Bashkir State Pedagogical University. The poet is surrounded by two children near a spring, where he tells stories to the children with a book. Willow trees have been specially planted nearby.
