= Bashkir Dhe =

Letter of the Cyrillic script

Usage
- Writing system: Cyrillic
- Type: Alphabet
- Sound values: [ð]

Bashkir Dhe, also known as Byelorussian-Ukrainian I with curve, is a letter of the Cyrillic script. It was historically used in Bashkir.

== Usage ==
This letter was used in Mstislav Aleksandrovich Kulayev's Bashkir alphabet of 1912. In modern day, this has been replaced by Ҙ.

== Gallery ==
Majuscule form

Minuscule form

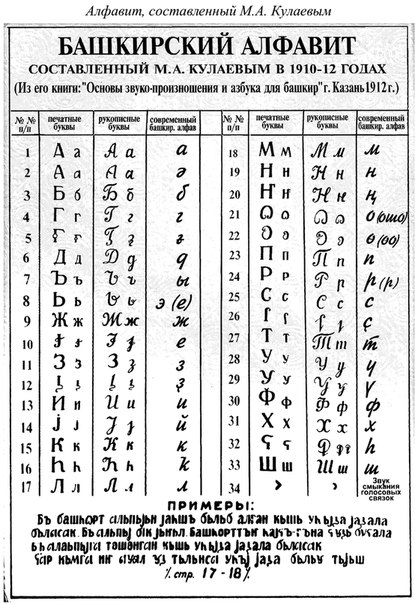
Bashkir Dhe in the Bashkir alphabet of Mstislav Aleksandrovich Kulayev, c. 1910 - 1912.

== Encoding ==
This letter has not yet been encoded in Unicode.
