= Ghabdellatif of Kazan =

Khan of the Kazan Khanate from 1496 to 1502

Ghabdellati
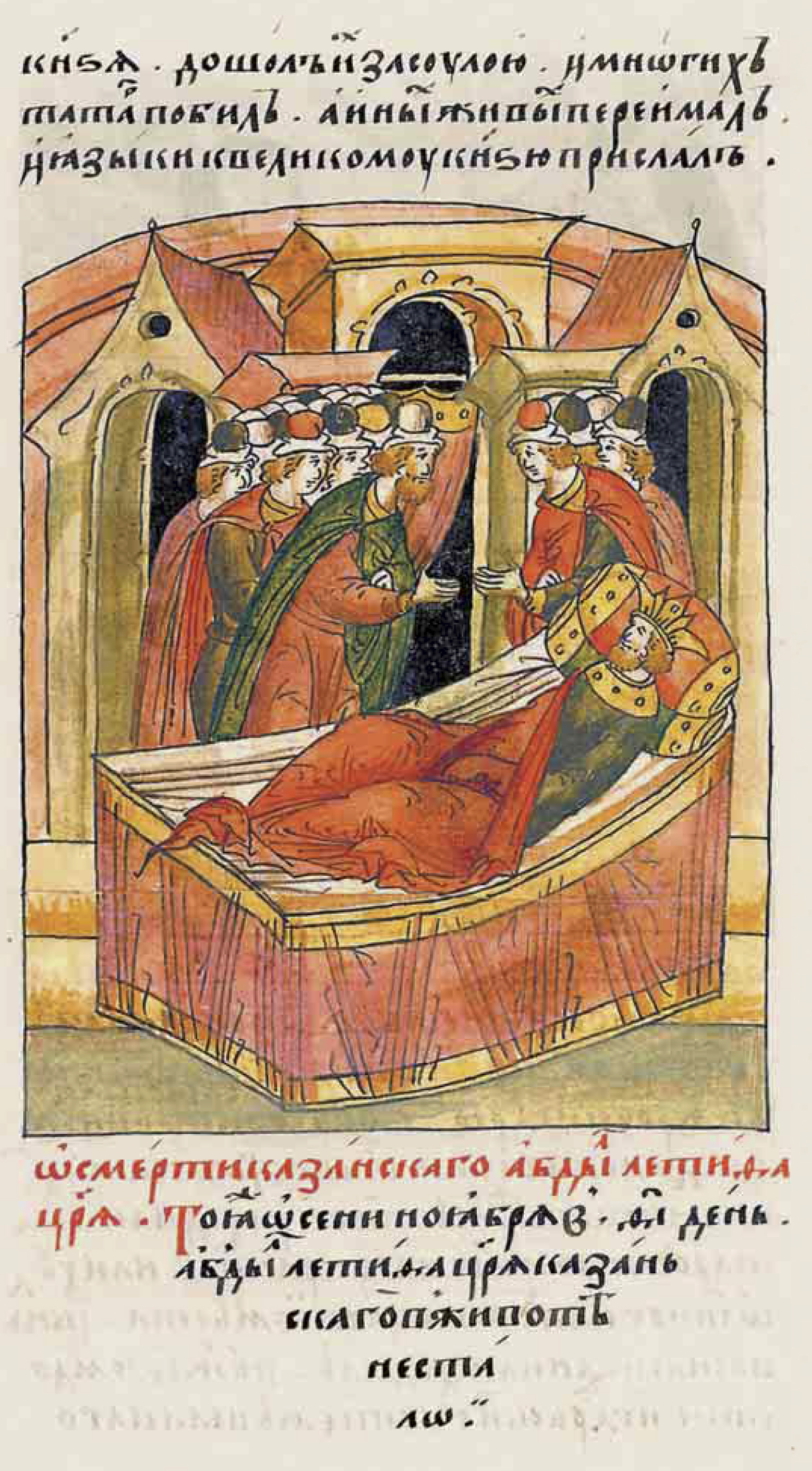
- Death of Ghabdellatif, miniature from the Illustrated Chronicle of Ivan the Terrible

Khan of the Tatar Kazan Khanate
- Reign: 1496–1502
- Predecessor: Mamuq of Kazan
- Successor: Möxämmädämin of Kazan
- Born: c. 1475
- Died: after 1502
- Father: Ibrahim of Kazan
- Mother: Nur Soltan

Ghabdellatif (Volga Türki and Persian: عبد اللطیف; c. 1475 – after 1502) was Khan of the Kazan Khanate from 1496 to 1502.

== Life ==
Ghabdellatif was the youngest son of Ibrahim of Kazan and Nur Soltan. When Ghabdellatif's father died in 1479, his mother married Meñli I Giray and relocated to the Crimean Khanate. Around 1490 Meñli I Giray sent Ghabdellatif to Muscovy for service, where he received the town of Zvenigorod, while his brother Moxammat Amin ruled Kashira. This was considered a great honor because these towns were usually given to the sons of the grand prince of Moscow.

After a 1495 coup against the pro-Moscow Moxammat Amin, the khan Mamuq quickly discredited himself. Ghabdellatif was chosen as a weaker alternative to his brother Moxammat Amin with Moscow's approval.

In 1499, another attempt was made to restore the Siberian dynasty to the throne of Kazan. Uraq attempted to establish Agalaq as Kazan khan, but the attempt was repelled.

Ghabdellatif grew up in the Crimean Khanate, which had closer ties with the Ottoman Empire than with Muscovy. As he became older, he started to conduct more independent politics, which was unacceptable to the faction which selected him for the throne. In 1501 a group of Kazan nobles headed by Qol (Kel) Axmat visited Moscow and in January 1502, an embassy from Muscovy came to Kazan. Ghabdellatif was ousted, taken from Kazan under guard to Moscow and then exiled to Beloozero (now Belozersk, Russia). Moxammat Amin was installed as khan once again. The conflict resulted in a number of inquiries from the Crimean Khanate but did not lead to hostilities, perhaps because the throne passed to another step son of Meñli I Giray and because the Crimean Khanate was busy with a war against the Golden Horde.

It is possible that Ghabdellatif lived in exile at least until 1511, when he was visited by his mother.

== Bibliography ==
- Kołodziejczyk, Dariusz (2011). The Crimean Khanate and Poland-Lithuania: International Diplomacy on the European Periphery (15th-18th Century). A Study of Peace Treaties Followed by Annotated Documents. Leiden: Brill. ISBN 9789004191907. Archived from the original on 2017-06-30.

== See also ==
- List of Kazan khans

Preceded by Mamuq	Khan of Kazan; 1496–1502	Succeeded by Moxammat Amin
