= Battle for Nizhny Novgorod (1439) =

Battle during the First Russo-Kazan War

- Part of the First Russo-Kazan war (1437–1445)
Date	1439
Location	Nizhny Novgorod
Result	Tatar victory

Belligerents
Grand Principality of Moscow	Kazan Khanate

Commanders and leaders
Unknown	Ulugh Muhammad

The Battle for Nizhny Novgorod took place between the Tatar troops under the command of Ulugh Muhammad and Russian troops led by the Grand Principality of Moscow.

== Course of hostilities ==
After Ulug-Mohammed established himself in the Middle Volga region, he decided to restore dominance over the Russian principalities, while marching to Moscow, Ulug Muhammad besieged Nizhny Novgorod almost without resistance.
