= Gawharshat =

Gawharshat of Kazan (also Gauharshad) (before 1479 – after 1546 CE), was a Kazan princess. She was the regent of the Kazan Khanate between 1531 and 1533 during the minority of her son, Canghali of Kazan.

She was the daughter of Ibrahim of Kazan and Nur Sultan. She married Qasim khan Shayex Allahiar (Şäyex Allahiär) (r. 1512-1515). In 1531, she managed to put her son on the Kazan throne with the support of Moscow and the local elite. Since her son was a minor, he was placed under a regency under her presidency. Her regency lasted for two years and ended in 1533.
