= Daniil Kholmsky =

15th-century Russian prince and military leader

- Knyaz
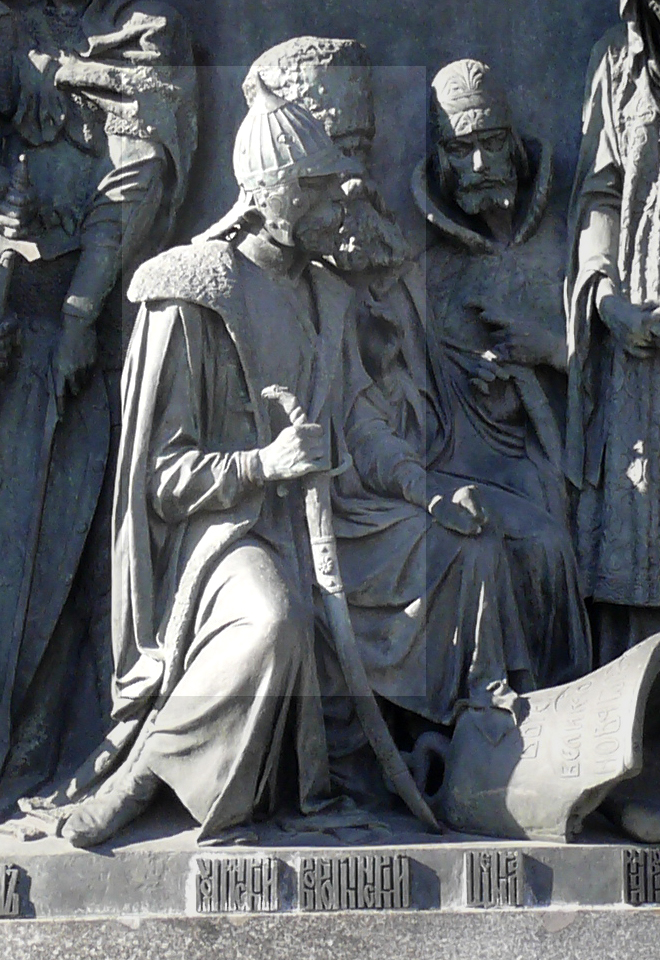
- Daniil Kholmsky as depicted on the Millennium of Russia monument

Prince of Kholm
- Predecessor: Dmitri Kholmsky
- Successor: Vasily Kholmsky
- Other titles: Voyevoda, boyar
- Born: 15th century Kholm
- Died: 1493
- Wars and battles: Russo-Kazan Wars, Battle of Shelon
- Offices: Boyar duma (c.1473/1479–c.1493)
- Noble family: Kholmsky
- Issue: Vasily Danilovich; Semyon Danilovich
- Father: Dmitri Yurievich

Daniil Dmitrievich Kholmsky (Russian: Даниил Дмитриевич Холмский; c.15th century – 1493) was a Russian knyaz (prince), boyar, and voivode who served under Ivan the Great. One of the most prominent generals of his era, Kholmsky played key roles in Muscovy's military campaigns against Kazan, Novgorod, and Lithuania, and helped lay the foundations of a centralized Russian state. He belonged to the princely House of Kholmsky and was the father of fellow voivode and boyar Vasily Kholmsky, who married Ivan III’s daughter Feodosiya Ivanovna.

== Early life and rise to prominence ==
Daniil was the son of Dmitri Yurievich Kholmsky and related to Mikhail III of Tver, the Grand Prince of Tver. His brother, Prince Mikhail Dmitrievich, was chief adviser to the Tverian ruler. Daniil entered the service of Grand Prince Ivan III of Moscow as early as 1467, becoming the first of several high-profile defectors from Tver to Moscow prior to Tver’s eventual annexation in 1485. He quickly rose through the ranks, participating in the Kazan campaign of 1469, and by the early 1470s, was a prominent military leader and member of the boyar duma.

== Military career ==
=== Campaigns against Kazan ===
Kholmsky first gained renown in 1468 when he led a surprise counterattack against the besieging forces of the Khanate of Kazan at Murom, lifting the siege. During the 1469 campaign, he commanded the vanguard regiment and secured victory over Khan Ibrahim, resulting in a treaty favorable to Moscow that included the return of Russian prisoners and improved diplomatic ties.

In 1487, Kholmsky once again led Muscovite forces against Kazan. On 9 July, his army captured the city, deposing a ruler opposed to Moscow and installing the pro-Russian Möxämmädämin.

=== Novgorod and the Battle of Shelon ===
In 1471, Kholmsky led the Muscovite vanguard alongside Boyar Fedor Davidovich in Ivan III’s campaign against Novgorod. After minor victories at Korostyn and Staraya Russa, he decisively defeated the Novgorodian army at the Battle of Shelon, a pivotal engagement that severely weakened Novgorod's independence and set the stage for its annexation.

Kholmsky returned in 1477 during Ivan’s second Novgorod campaign. Leading the main army across the ice of Lake Ilmen, he encircled the city overnight, forcing its surrender.

=== Other campaigns ===
In 1472, he confronted the forces of Akhmat Khan of the Great Horde, who had destroyed Alexin. The Khan withdrew without engaging Kholmsky.

In 1473–74, Kholmsky led a Muscovite force to relieve the allied city of Pskov from a siege by the Livonian Order. He negotiated a peace treaty that secured trade rights for Russian merchants in the Baltic and expelled the Livonian forces. Chroniclers dubbed the agreement "Daniil’s Peace." In recognition, Ivan III elevated Kholmsky to the rank of boyar but required an oath of loyalty that barred him from serving other Muscovite princes.

In 1480, Kholmsky played a key role in the Great Standing on the Ugra River, helping organize Russian fortifications in the standoff that ended Mongol rule over Moscow.

In 1489, he co-led a campaign against the rebellious region of Vyatka with several other voevody, successfully reasserting Muscovite control.

In 1492, he took part in the war against Lithuania, defending the Upper Oka Principalities from attempts by Alexander Jagiellon to bring them into the Grand Duchy of Lithuania.

== Later life and death ==
At the height of his influence, Kholmsky faced accusations of treason, allegedly stemming from courtly rivalries. He was restored to favor with the support of church leaders and a bail paid by eight nobles. He continued to serve Ivan III until his death in 1493.

== Family ==
Daniil married the eldest daughter of Ivan Ivanovich Vsevolozhkii. They had at least three children:

- Semyon Danilovich
- Vasily Danilovich (1460s–1524)
- A daughter who married Ivan Vladimirovich Golova Khovrin
