= Battle of Moscow (disambiguation) =

The Battle of Moscow was a 1941–1942 battle during World War II.

Battle of Moscow may also refer to:

- Battle of Molodi in 1572 during Russo-Crimean Wars
- Battle of Moscow (1612) during the Polish–Muscovite War
- Battle of Borodino in 1812 during the Napoleonic Wars, also called Battle of Moscow
- Advance on Moscow (1919), during the Russian Civil War
- Battle of Moscow in 1863 in Tennessee during the American Civil war
- Battle of Prairie D'Ane in 1864 in Arkansas during the American Civil War, also called Battle of Moscow
- Battle of Moscow (film), a 1985 Soviet film on the 1941 battle

== See also ==
- French occupation of Moscow
- Siege of Moscow (disambiguation)
