= Qul Ghali =

Volga Bulgarian poet (c. 1183 – 1236)

- Born: 1183
- Died: 1236 (aged 52–53)
- Occupation: Poet
- Writing career
- Language: Volga Türki
- Subject: Poetry

Qul Ghali (Volga Türki: قل علی; Tatar: Кол Гали, Qol Ğali; Bashkir: Ҡол Ғәли, romanized: Qul Ğəliy; Chuvash: Кул Али, romanized: Kul Ali; c. 1183 – 1236) was a famous Muslim Volga Bulgarian poet. His most famous poem is Qissa-i Yusuf (قصه یوسف; Tale of Yusuf), written in the Volga Turki language, which is mutually intelligible with the modern Tatar, Bashkir and Chuvash languages.

== Biography ==
According to historian Ravil Bukharaev, Ghali was likely born into a cleric family in Volga Bulgaria. He studied in the Khwarezmean madrassah. Ghali also resided or studied in various areas around Volga Bulgaria and possibly traveled to Iran, Syria and other parts of the Middle East. He wrote his immortal poem in 1233. It is theorized that Ghali spent his last years at Bilyar. He was probably killed in 1236 during the Mongol invasion of Volga Bulgaria.

== Works ==
Qissa-i Yusuf (قصه یوسف, also transliterated Qïssa-yï Yusuf), also known as the Yosïfnamä, was inspired by Qur'anic stories of Joseph. The poem is devoted to the struggle against evil and for human happiness. The poem played a major role in the Muslim Volga Bulgarian culture and later the Bashkir and Tatar culture. More than 200 manuscripts have been found among the Bashkirs and Tatars. According to textual analysis, the poem contains many Persian and Arabic loanwords. The poem shows familiarity with Egyptian and other Middle Eastern customs but also contains detailed descriptions of the culture and customs of the inhabitants of Volga Bulgaria.

== Legacy ==
His poems are celebrated by the Bashkirs, Tatars and the Chuvash.

Qissa-i Yusuf was often used as a textbook to teach or improve the reading skills of children and adults for centuries. The poem greatly influenced later poets in the region. According to Agnès Kefeli, "from its publication to the end of the nineteenth century, this epic remained a 'best seller' on the Silk Road from Russia to China"; among nineteenth-century Tatar Muslim women, "when a girl got married, the custom was to wrap Qul ‘Ali’s book of Joseph in an embroidered towel and place it at the bottom of her wedding chest". The poem was prepared for publishing for the first time by the poet Utız İmäni and printed in 1839 by Räxmätulla Ämirxanov. Since then it has been republished 80 times and translated into English.

== Qul Ghali award ==
The Qul Ghali International Award is named after Qul Ghali. It is awarded to recognize excellence in literature and poetry. The award was established in 1992.
