= Miftahetdin Akmulla =

Bashkir poet and philosopher (1831–1895)

Miftaxetdin Kamaletdin ulı Kamaletdinov
- Born: 27 December [O.S. 14 December] 1831; Tuqhanbay, Belebeyevsky Uyezd, Orenburg Governorate, Russian Empire
- Died: 21 October [O.S. 8 October] 1895 (aged 63); Syrostan, Troitsk Uyezd, Orenburg Governorate, Russian Empire
- Occupations: Poet, turkologist

Miftakhetdin Kamaletdinovich Kamaletdinov (Note: Russian: Мифтахетдин Камалетдинович Камалетдинов; Bashkir: Камалетдинов Мифтахетдин Камалетдин улы, romanized: Kamaletdinov Miftaxetdin Kamaletdin ulı; Kazakh: Мифтахетдин Камалетдинұлы Мұхамедияров, romanized: Miftahetdin Kamaletdinuly Muhamediyarov), known as Akmulla (Bashkir: Aҡмулла, romanized: Aqmulla, Kazakh: Ақмолла, romanized: Aqmolla) (1831–1895) was a Bashkir and Kazakh educator, poet and philosopher.

== Biography ==
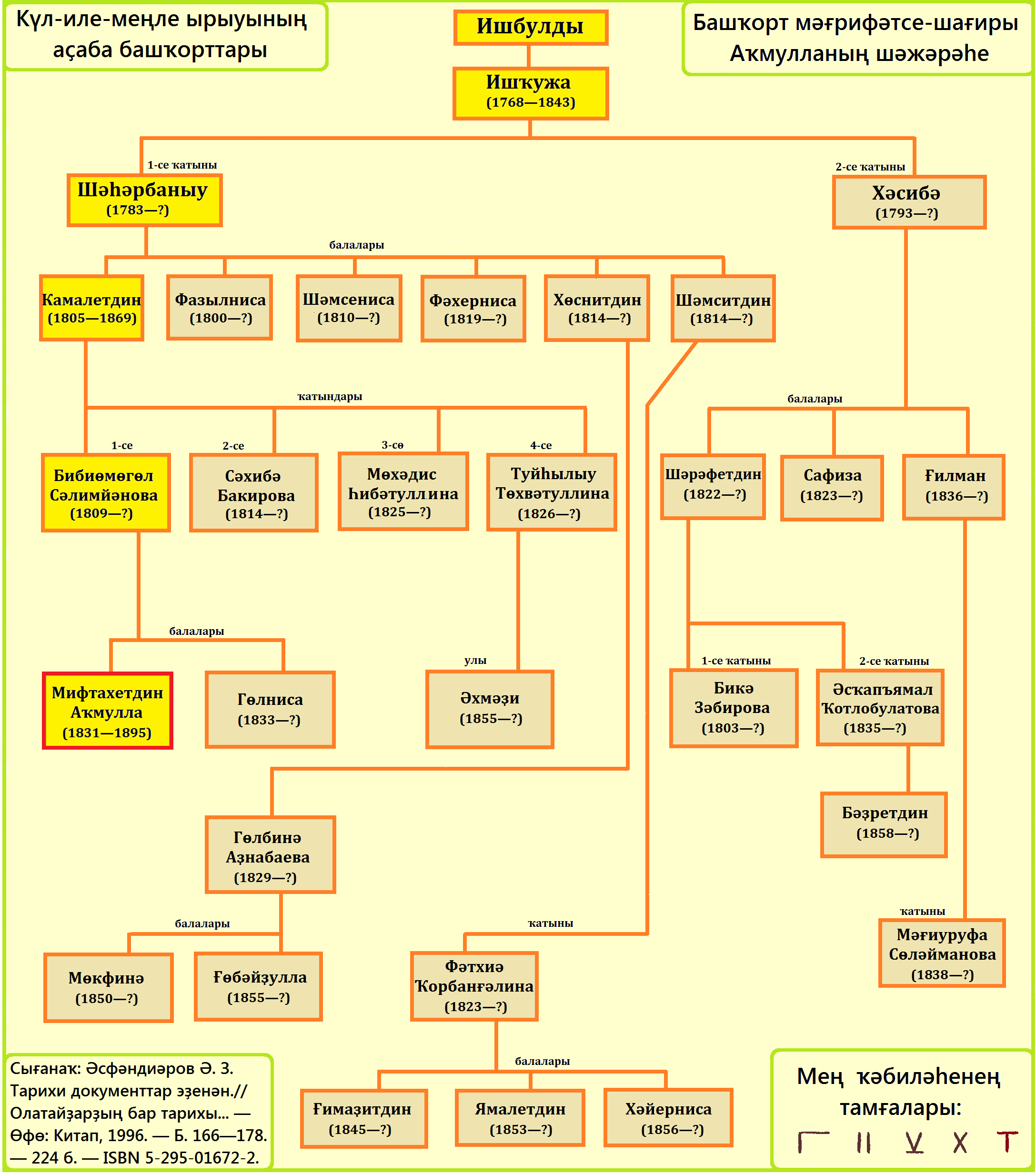
Family tree of Akmulla

Born 14 December 1831 in the village of Tuqhanbay, Kulil-Minsk volost Belebeyevsk Uyezd, Orenburg Governorate (currently the Miyakinsky district of the Republic of Bashkortostan).

According to the census documents of the 19th century, the father is Kamaletdin İsqujin (born in 1805), the designated imam, and his mother is Bibiömmögölsöm Səlimyənova (born in 1809), both are Bashkirs - the heirs of the Kulil-Minsky volost Belebeyevsky uyezd] (from the Bashkir clan Meñ). Rizaitdin bine Fəxretdin writes that the father of Akmulla was a Bashkir, and his mother was from “Kazan citizens” (one of the names of the Tatars)».

The future poet received primary education in his native village, studied in madrasah of the neighboring villages of Menouztamak and Anyasovo. In the mid-1850s he was a shakird of a madrassah (school) in the village of Sterlibashevo, where he received lessons from the famous Sufi poet Şəmsetdin Zəki. Subsequently, Akmulla lived and worked in different places. He taught children, was engaged in various crafts, in particular, worked as a carpenter, and also became known as a talented poet-improviser. Friendship with a Muslim religious figure Zəynulla Rəsülev played a large role in his formation as a philosopher.

Unable to live in one place, at 25 he went to travel. In 1859 Miftakhetdin still lived in his father's family at the age of 28 . Then Akmulla traveled to the south of the historical Bashkortostan, and then to the Trans-Urals. Miftahetdin Akmulla on his cart, in special compartments of which he kept books and manuscripts, carpentry and other tools, roamed the Bashkir villages of the upper reaches of the Yayıq River, the Ağiðel River, the Miass River Valley, and also in the steppes Kazakhstan, distributing among people humanistic ideas, including the views of Tatar enlighteners.

All year round he traveled from one village to another, on Habantuy competed with famous sesens (poets) in the art of poetic improvisation, and also read his poems to the people.

According to the denunciation of the Kazakh Batuch Isyangildin was he convicted of evading military service in the imperial army and for four years (1867–1871) was in Trinity Prison. Akmulla created many well-known works in prison: “My place is in prison” ( “Məkamım mineñ - zindan” ) and others.

The reason for Miftahetdin's imprisonment was, according to researchers, the fact that he was considered to be a Bashkir hiding from military service among Kazakhs. Only the intercession of the rich Kazakh Mukhamedyar helped him to be released. Among Kazakhs, Miftakhetdin was known as a sage and akyn (poet), was engaged in craft, taught children. He participated in aitysh (poetry competitions), which were arranged among the Kazakhs.

Miftahetdin was twice married. The first wife died in his native village, after which Akmulla left his native village. The second wife of the poet was Safiə daughter of Yuldybai from the village of Suleiman (Uchalinsky district of Bashkortostan). The young woman suffered from a lack of her own housing, constant moving, and when they ended up in her native land, she ran away from her husband. A Muslim court allowed a woman to leave her husband because he led the life of a wanderer.

Akmulla's death was unexpected and tragic. He was killed on the night of December 27 [O.S. December 14] 1895 on the road from Troitsk to Zlatoustnear the Syrostan railway station. Buried in a Muslim cemetery in Miass.

== Creativity ==
According to Bashkir scholars, Akmulla created most of his works in Bashkir and Kazakh languages, as well as in the Türkic language, which served as a common language for the Turkic peoples. According to researchers of Old Bashkir literature, the language of most Akmullah's works is mixed Kazakh-Old Bashkir, since it combines elements of both languages.

Before the October Revolution 1917, his books were published in Tatar, with frequent inclusion of individual Bashkir and Kazakh words and phrases, idiomatic expressions and comparisons, traditional images from Bashkir and Kazakh folklore. Akmulla preached enlightening ideas, considered poetry as a means of direct communication with the people.

Akmulla wrote his poems for the most part in the classical form rubyi, but he also used other poetic forms. Miftahetdin's work was permeated by the humanistic ideas of that time, and included advanced trends in the social life of Russia. In his work, he preached enlightening ideas, affirmed the human desire for progress. He deserved recognition among the population, and also had a strong influence on the development of literature on the development of literature of many Turkic-speaking peoples. His pseudonym Akmulla means "bright, righteous teacher."

The views, ideals, philosophical ideas of Akmulla were born in the struggle against religious fanaticism and the manifestations of medieval scholasticism, against oppression of the people. He saw the main way to make life easier for the common people in education, in mastering knowledge, in eradicating ignorance. The central place in Akmulla's worldview was occupied by the question of the place of knowledge in the life of society. He adhered to the positions idealism and in understanding the laws of social development, he believed that the social problems can be eliminated through education. This is reflected, for example, in the poem "Edification."

For Akmulla, the central place in the system of his values was occupied by knowledge and upbringing, the inner purity of man, problems of moral and moral order. Akmulla's creativity formed a whole poetic school. His works influenced poetry Gabdulla Tukai, Məjit Ğafuri, Şəyexzada Babiç, Dawıt Yultıy, Şafiq Əminev-Tamyani, Səyfi Qoðaş and others. Miftahetdin Akmulla is widely known not only in Bashkortostan and the Russian Federation, but also in the countries of the former USSR.

In 1892, the elegy “In Memory of Şihabetdin Märcani” was published in Kazan. This small book was the first and last lifetime edition of the poet's works.

Not all of Akumulla's creative heritage has been preserved. In 1981, in connection with the anniversary of the poet, the Bashkir Book Publishing House published in Bashkir the one-volume works. This book, which is the most complete in comparison with previous collections of Akmullah, includes more than three thousand lines. However, many of the poet's works are either not yet found, or possibly completely lost. The reason for this was that Akmulla kept most of his works in memory. Poems of the poet were distributed orally or in manuscript.

== Works and publications ==
- “My place is in prison”
- "My Bashkirs, we must learn!"
- In memory of Shigabutdin Marjani. Kazan, 1892 (in Tatar.)
- In memory of Shigabutdin Marjani and other verses. Kazan, 1907 (in Tatar.)
- Collection of poems. Alma-Ata, 1935 (in Kazakh)
- Akmullah. Poems. Ufa, Bashkignoizdat, 1981, 223 pp. (on Bashkir)
- They say ...
- Spring
- Here is the word of Akmulla

== Legacy ==
- In the years 1911-1916. a satirical Muslim magazine “ Akmulla” is published.
- In the poet's homeland, in the village of Tukhanbay Miyakinsky district, the Museum of Miftahetdin Akmulla was created in 1981.
- In 1980, the Akmulla Prize for works of literature and art was established. (Prize winners: Rashit Shakur (1989), Akhat Vildanov (1990), Rozaliya Sultangareeva (1993), Roza Sakhautdinova (1994), Gazim Shafikov (1995) and others).
- Bashkir State Pedagogical University named after Miftakhetdin Akmulla .
- October 8, 2008 in Ufa was unveiled a monument to Miftakhetdin Akmulla in the park of the same name on the site in front of Bashkir State Pedagogical University on October Revolution Street .
- In honor of the poet, the municipal newspaper of the Miyakinsky district was named - “Akumulla toyege” (Bashk. “The native land of Akmulla”).
- A weekly literary and humorous supplement “Akmulla” ”to the republican newspaper Bashkortostan” is being published.
- A street in Almetyevsk (Tatarstan) is named after the poet.

== Literature ==
- Башкирская энциклопедия. В 7 т.: Т. 1. А — Б / гл. ред. М. А. Ильгамов. — Уфа: Башкирская энциклопедия, 2005. — 624 б.
- Вильданов А. Х., Кунафин Г. С. Башкирские просветители-демократы XIX в. М., 1981.
- Шакуров Р. З. Звезда поэзии. Уфа, 1981.
- Вильданов Ә. Х. Аҡмулла — яҡтылыҡ йырсыһы. Өфө, 1981.
- Башҡорт әҙәбиәте тарихы, 6 томда. 2-се том. Өфө, 1990.
