= Mäxmüd of Kazan =

Khan of the Kazan Khanate from 1445 to 1466

Mäxmüd
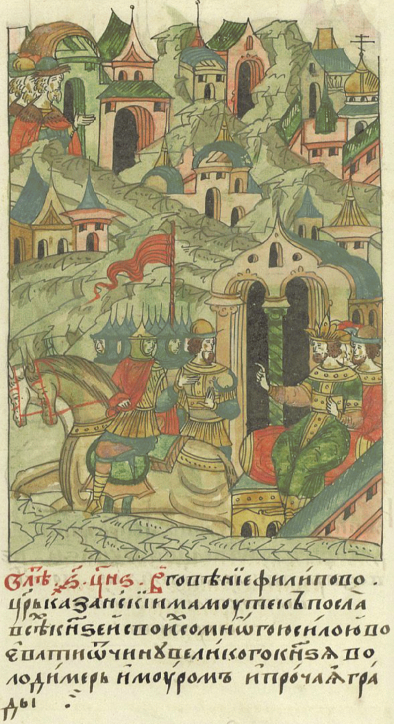
- Mäxmüd sends an army to Moscow, miniature from the Illustrated Chronicle of Ivan the Terrible

Khan of the Tatar Kazan Khanate
- Reign: 1445 – 1466
- Predecessor: Ulugh Muhammad
- Successor: Xälil
- Died: 1466

Mäxmüd Khan (Volga Türki and Persian: محمود خان, pronounced [mæxˈmyt]; Russian: Махмутек, Makhmutek; died 1466) was Khan of the Khanate of Kazan from 1445 to 1466.

== Life ==
He was the eldest son of Oluğ Möxämmäd, and is reputed to be one of the Khanate's founders. Mäxmüd participated in his father's military campaigns against Muscovy, and in 1445, was victorious at the Battle of Suzdal, taking the Grand Duke of Moscow Vasily II captive and forcing Muscovy to pay tribute (yasak). After the death of Oluğ Möxämmäd, Mäxmüd succeeded to the throne of Kazan. In December 1446, he supported Vasily II in dethroning Dmitry Shemyaka. In 1448, Mäxmüd attacked Moscow to preserve advantageous treaty conditions that were concluded after the battle of Suzdal. In that period, the Qasim Khanate, governed by Mäxmüd's relatives, was created as a buffer state between Muscovy and the Khanate of Kazan.

== See also ==
- List of Kazan khans

Preceded by Oluğ Möxämmäd	Khan of Kazan Khanate; 1445–1466	Succeeded by Xälil
