= Battle of Suzdal =

Coordinates: 56°26′N 40°26′E

- Part of the First Russo-Kazan war (1437–1445) and the Muscovite War of Succession
Date	7 July 1445
Location	Suzdal
Result	Tatar victory

Belligerents
Khanate of Kazan	Muscovy

Commanders and leaders
Mäxmüd	Vasily II (POW)

Strength
3,500	1,000

The Battle of Suzdal (Russian: Битва под Суздалем) or the Battle of the Kamenka River was fought on 7 July 1445, between Russians under Vasily II and Tatar troops of Oluğ Möxämmäd, who invaded the principality of Nizhny Novgorod. The Russians were defeated by troops of beg Mäxmüd, who became Mäxmüd of Kazan after the battle. Vasily was taken prisoner and was set free only after the enormous (200,000 roubles) ransom was paid. He also promised restitution of the lands of Mishar Yurt, that were bought from Tokhtamysh in 1343. Qasim Khanate was founded there to become a buffer state and the vassal of Muscovy later.

== Sources ==
- "Suzdal yanındağı suğış/Суздаль янындагы сугыш". Tatar Encyclopaedia (in Tatar). Kazan: The Republic of Tatarstan Academy of Sciences. Institution of the Tatar Encyclopaedia. 2002.
