= Bashkir alphabet =

Writing systems for the Bashkir language

The Bashkir alphabet (Bashkir: Башҡорт әлифбаһы, romanized: Başqort əlifbahı) is a writing system used for the Bashkir language. Until the mid-19th century, Bashkir speakers wrote in the Volga Türki literary language using the Arabic script. In 1869, Russian linguist Mirsalikh Bekchurin published the first guide to Bashkir grammar, and the first Cyrillic Bashkir introductory book was published by Vasily Katarinsky in Orenburg in 1892. Latinisation was first discussed in June 1924, when the first draft of the Bashkir alphabet using the Latin script was created. More reforms followed, culminating in the final version in 1938.

== History ==
=== Early period ===
Until the mid-19th century, Bashkir speakers wrote in the Volga Türki literary language using the Arabic script. Many works of Bashkir literature were written in Volga Türki, including Bashkir shezhere ("Genealogies of the Bashkir People"), Batyrsha's Letter to Empress Elizaveta, the orders of Salawat Yulayev, as well as works from the poets A. Kargaly, Tadgetdin Yalsigul Al-Bashkordi, H. Salikhov, Gali Sokoroy, Miftahetdin Akmulla, and Mukhametsalim Umetbaev. The influence of spoken Bashkir is noticeable in many works from the period.

The first attempts to create a writing system that fully represented the Bashkir language began in the middle of the 19th century, with writers attempting to adapt the Cyrillic alphabet. One such proponent was turkologist and linguist Nikolay Ilminsky, in his work Introductory Reading in the Turkish-Tatar Language Course.

In 1869, Russian linguist Mirsalikh Bekchurin published the first guide to Bashkir grammar in the book An Initial Guide to the Study of Arabic, Persian and Tatar Languages with the Adverbs of Bukhara, Bashkirs, Kyrgyz and Residents of Turkestan. The first Cyrillic Bashkir introductory book was published by Vasily Katarinsky in Orenburg in 1892, with his proposed alphabet excluding the letters ё, й, ѳ, and ѵ from the contemporaneous Cyrillic alphabet and including the additional characters of Ä, г̇, ҥ, Ö, ӳ. Another primer was prepared at the end of the 19th century by Nikolaï Katanov using the umlaut (ӓ – / ә /, ӧ – / ө /, ӟ – / ҙ /, к̈ – / ҡ /, ӱ – / и /, etc.), however this work was never published.

In 1907, Alexander Bessonov published The Primer for the Bashkirs. This publication proposed that alphabet included all the letters of the Cyrillic alphabet of the time, except for ё and й, and added the characters ӓ, г̣, д̣, ҥ, ӧ, с̣, and ӱ. Five years later, Mstislav Kulaev (Mukhametkhan Kulaev) published The Basics of Onomatopoeia and the Alphabet for Bashkirs (reprinted in 1919), again making use of the Cyrillic alphabet in conjunction with new characters.

=== Arabic alphabet ===
In July 1921, the 2nd All-Bashkir Congress of Soviets decided to create their own script for Bashkir as the state language of the Bashkir ASSR. In December 1922, the Congress formed a commission for the development of a new official alphabet and spelling at the ASSR's Academic Center of the People's Commissariat of Education. This alphabet remained in use until the official adoption of Latin alphabet in 1930.

The commission adapted the Arabic alphabet to the needs of Bashkir phonology. The commission excluded some letters and normalized the spelling of vowels. The process wasn't without controversy. During the conference, 3 proposals came to be considered, "Old orthography / Iśke imlä", "Middle orthography / Urta imlä", and "New orthography / Yaña imlä". Old orthography was the existing old Bashkir written tradition that was in use for centuries in Bashkortostan. Middle orthography was a middle-ground modification that proposed modifying the alphabet to match Bashkir phonology, but not too radically. This orthography is to have 6 vowels, and rely on context or a marker for indicating the specific vowel sounds of each word. Its proponents argued that this orthography would be the most realistic, and it will be the easiest to implement. "New orthography" proposed a radical modification, specifically to add 9 vowels. At the end of the day, "New orthography" was deemed too unrealistic to implement, as printing presses in the region did not have the required letter types. Thus "middle orthography" was adopted and was referred to as "New orthography / Yaña imlä" in contrast with the old.

The new writing system used a hamza on ya (ئـ‌ ئ) at the beginning of words that start with vowels. The alphabet underwent several minor iterations of changes and updates to the orthographic conventions between 1924 and 1930.

The officially-approved alphabet contained the following consonant and vowel letters:

Bashkir Arabic alphabet consonant
Arabic (Cyrillic) [IPA]	ب (Б б) [b][β]	پ (П п) [p]	ت (Т т) [t]	ث (Ҫ ҫ) [θ]	ج (Җ җ) [d͡ʒ]	چ (Ч ч) [tʃ]	ح (Х х) [χ]	د (Д д) [d]	ذ (Ҙ ҙ) [ð]
Arabic (Cyrillic) [IPA]	ر (Р р) [r]	ز (З з) [z]	ژ (Ж ж) [ʐ]	س (С с) [s]	ش (Ш ш) [ʃ]	ع (Ғ ғ) [ʁ]	ف (Ф ф) [ɸ]	ق (Ҡ ҡ) [q]	ك (К к) [k]
Arabic (Cyrillic) [IPA]	گ (Г г) [g]	ڭ (Ң ң) [ŋ~ɴ]	ل (Л л) [l]	م (М м) [m]	ن (Н н) [n]	و (У у / Ү ү) [w]	ھ (Һ һ) [h]	ی (Й й) [j]	ئ (- / Ъ ъ / Ь ь) [ʔ]
Arabic (Cyrillic) [IPA]	ۋ (В в) [v~w]								

Bashkir Arabic alphabet Vowels
		Rounded		Unrounded		
		Close	Open	Close		Open
Back	Arabic	ࢭئو / ࢭـو	ࢭئۇ / ࢭـۇ		ࢭئـ / ࢭـىُـ/ ࢭىُ	ئا / ا / ‍ـا
Back	Cyrillic (Latin)	У у (U u)	О о (O o)		Ы ы (I ı)	А а (A a)
Back	IPA	[u]	[ʊ]		[ɯ]	[ɑ]
Front	Arabic	ئو / ـو	ئۇ / ـۇ	ئيـ / یـ / ی	ئـ / ـىُـ/ ىُ	ئە / ـە / ە
Front	Cyrillic (Latin)	Ү ү (Ü ü)	Ө ө (Ö ö)	И и (İ i)	Э э / Е е (Ee)	Ә ә (Ä ä)
Front	IPA	[ʏ]	[ø]	[e]	[ɪ]	[æ]

Similar to other Turkic languages, Bashkir has vowel harmony rules. Bashkir orthography has two-dimensional vowel harmony rules, front versus back vowels, and rounded versus unrounded vowels.

There are 9 vowel sounds in Bashkir, but the orthography only offers 6 letters (ئا، ئە، یـ، ىُـ، و، ۇ). Thus in order to determine how a vowel letter is pronounced, reliance, either on a special diacritic, or on word context is required.

low alef ⟨ ࢭ ⟩ has a unique role in Bashkir and Tatar Arabic scripts, a role not seen in other Arabic scripts. Bashkir Arabic script makes use of this special diacritic U+08AD ࢭ ARABIC LETTER LOW ALEF, and it can only ever come at the beginning of words. It never comes in the middle or end of words. Low alef doesn't represent any sound in Bashkir . Instead, it indicates that the vowels in the word will be the following back vowels:

- ࢭئـ / ࢭىُ: Ы ы (I ı)
- ࢭئۇ / ࢭۇ: О о (O o)
- ࢭئو / ࢭو: У у (U u)

The logic essentially is that low alef indicates that the vowels of the word are articulated in the same part of the mouth as an [ɑ] sound, which is written with an alif ⟨ ئا / ا ⟩, i.e. at back of the mouth.

The corresponding front vowel pairs of the three aforementioned back vowels are the following:

- ئـ / ىُ: Э э / Е е (E e)
- ئۇ / ۇ: Ө ө (Ӧ ӧ)
- ئو / و: Ү ү (Ü ü)

Hamza plays a similar but inverse role in Kazakh Arabic Alphabet, marking that vowels in a word will be front vowels.

There are exceptions in Bashkir orthography, meaning words that will have back vowels, but won't have low alef written for them. First are words that contain the vowel alef А а (A a) (shown in Arabic Script as ئا / ا / ـا). This vowel is a back vowel, and its corresponding front vowel pair is written with a different letter altogether. Thus, it is an unambiguous conclusion that any word containing alef, will have all its other vowels as back vowels too. Thus, the low alef will be redundant, and so it's not written.

For example, the word йорт (yort), meaning "house", is written with low alef, as ࢭیۇرت . But in its plural form, йорттар (yorttar) is written as یۇرتتار.

Inversely, words that contain the vowel Ә ә (Ä ä) (shown in Arabic Script as ئە / ـە / ە) or И и (İ i) (shown in Arabic Script as ئیـ / ـیـ / ی) are unambiguously words in which all vowels will be front vowels.

The second exception, is words that contain the following consonants:

- Г г (G g) (گ)
- Ғ ғ (Ğ ğ) (ع)
- К к (K k) (ك)
- Ҡ ҡ (Q q) (ق)

As per Bashkir phonology, the letters Г г (G g) (گ) and К к (K k) (ك) can only be accompanied by front vowels. Thus there won't be any words containing these consonants that would need low alef. In contrast, the letters Ғ ғ (Ğ ğ) (ع) and Ҡ ҡ (Q q) (ق) can only be accompanied by back vowels. This means that they themselves act as indicators that vowels in a word are back vowels, thus eliminating a need for low alef. For example, the word йылы (yılı), meaning "warm", is written as ࢭیلىُ, whereas, a derived word, such as йылылыҡ / yılılıq, meaning "heat", is written as یلىُلق.

The rejected "New orthography / Yaña imlä" proposal would not have had reliance on such orthographic conventions as those mentioned above for the actually adopted "Middle orthography". Instead, this orthography was to have 9 vowels, one per each sound, as shown on the below table.

Vowels in the rejected "New Orthography" proposal for Bashkir
Cyrillic (Latin)	Arabic			
Cyrillic (Latin)	Final	Medial	Isolated	Initial
А а (A a)	ا	ـا	ا	ئا
Ә ә (Ä ä)	ـە / ە	ـىَـ	ىَـ	ئىَـ
Ы ы (I ı)	ىُٖـ	ـىُٖـ	ىُٖـ	ئىُٖـ
Е е / Э э (E e)	ىُـ	ـىُـ	ىُـ	ئىُـ
И и (İ i)	ىِـ	ـىِـ	ىِـ	ئىِـ
О о (O o)	ۈ	ـۈ	ۈ	ئۈ
У у (U u)	وٓ	ـوٓ	وٓ	ئوٓ
Ө ө (Ö ö)	ۇ	ـۇ	ۇ	ئۇ
Ү ү (Ü ü)	و	ـو	و	ئو

=== Latin alphabet ===
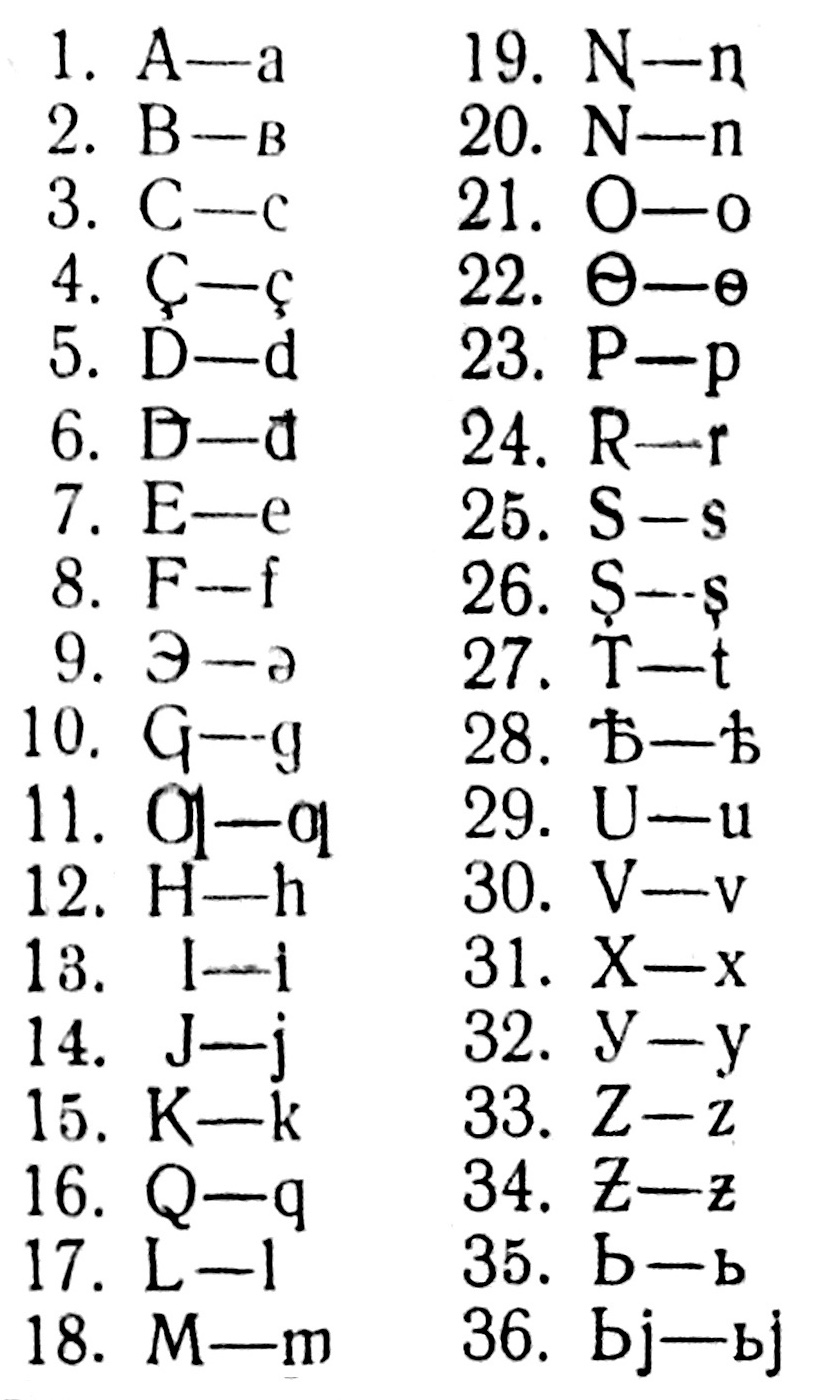
Bashkir alphabet in Başqort tele imləhe (1930).

The Bashkir ASSR Academic Center began discussing Latinisation in June 1924 and drafted a Bashkir alphabet using the Latin script later that year. That draft was later modified according to the following suggestions:

Cyrillic	Latin
һ	h
х	ħ
ѕ	ȗ, ə
ң	n̑
ш	ŝ
ҫ	t'
ый	o
f	ĵ
ԝ	ŭ
җ	ĝ, j

In June 1927, the All-Union Committee of the New Turkic alphabet approved a single alphabet for the Turkic peoples of the USSR; Yañalif, with the additional letters Đ đ [ð] and Ѣ ѣ [θ]. The Bashkir Latinized alphabet was again revised to align with this standard, and on 6 July 1930, the Central Executive Committee of the Bashkir ASSR officially approved the new revision. In May 1933, at the conference of the Bashkir Scientific Research Institute of Language and Literature, the letter Ç ç was removed. The digraph ьj was similarly eliminated in 1938. Following these reforms, the Bashkir Latinized alphabet existed as follows:

A a	B ʙ	V v	G g	Ƣ ƣ	D d	Đ đ	E e	Ƶ ƶ
Z z	I i	J j	K k	Q q	L l	M m	N n	Ŋ ŋ
O o	Ɵ ɵ	P p	R r	S s	Ҍ ҍ	T t	U u	Y y
F f	X x	H h	C c	Ş ş	Ь ь	Ə ə

Today Bashkir Latin alphabet based on the Common Turkic alphabet is in use. It has 2 additional letters, representing special consonant sounds Đđ [ð] and Ŧŧ [θ].

A a	Ä ä	B b	C c	Ç ç	D d	Đ đ	E e	F f
G g	Ğ ğ	H h	X x	I ı	İ i	J j	K k	Q q
L l	M m	N n	Ñ ñ	O o	Ö ö	P p	R r	S s
Ş ş	T t	Ŧ ŧ	U u	Ü ü	V v	W w	Y y	Z z

=== Cyrillic alphabet ===
Final version	Alternative version
ә	э, ӓ, а̄
ү	ӳ, уь, ӱ, ӯ
һ	һь, хъ, гх, ҳ, хь
ҙ	дз, д́, дь, q, ӟ, дъ
ҫ	с̈, сь, ԑ, ц, с́, тсь
ө	ӧ, оь, о̋, ō, ǫ
ң	нг, нъ, ң, н́, н̄, ҥ
ғ	гь, ѵ, гг, ѓ
ҡ	кь, k, кк, к̄

== Historical and current alphabets ==
Compiled by:

Cyrillic (1940–present)	Latin (1930–1940)	Latin (1924 project)	Kulayev's alphabet	Arabic
А а	A a		А а	ا
Б б	B ʙ	B b	Б б	ب
В в	V v	V v	–	ۋ
В в	V v	W w	–	و
Г г	G g		Г г	گ
Ғ ғ	Ƣ ƣ	Ĝ ĝ		غ
Д д	D d		Д д	د
Ҙ ҙ	Đ đ	Dh dh		ذ
Е е, Э э	E e	Э э	Ь ь,	ئ
Ё ё	–			
Ж ж	Ƶ ƶ		Ж ж	ژ
-дж-	Ç ç (before 1933)	J j	–	ج
З з	Z z		З з	ز
И и	I i		И и	ئی
Й й	J j	–	Ј ј	ی
К к	K k		К к	ك
Ҡ ҡ	Q q		Һ һ	ق
Л л	L l		Л л	ل
М м	M m		М м	م
Н н	N n		Н н	ن
Ң ң	Ꞑ ꞑ		Ҥ ҥ	ڭ
О о	O o			ࢭئۇ
Ө ө	Ɵ ɵ	Ö ö		ئۇ
П п	P p		П п	پ
Р р	R r		Р р	ر
С с	S s		С с	س
Ҫ ҫ	Ҍ ҍ	Th th		ث
Т т	T t	T t	Т т	ت
У у	U u		У у	ࢭئو
Ү ү	Y y	Ü ü		ئو
Ф ф	F f		Ф ф	ف
Х х	X x		Х х	ح
Һ һ	H h			ھ
Ц ц	–			
Ч ч	C c		–	چ
Ш ш	Ş ş	Ç ç	Ш ш	ش
Щ щ	–			
–	Ьj ьj (before 1939)	Y y	–	ࢭىُی
Ъ ъ	–			
Ы ы	Ь ь	Ə ə	Ъ ъ	ࢭئ
Ь ь	–			
Ә ә	Ə ə	E e		ئە
Ю ю	–			
Я я	–			

== Sample of the scripts ==
Article 1 of the Universal Declaration of Human Rights:

Барлыҡ кешеләр ирекле, дәрәжәләре һәм хоҡуҡтары тигеҙ булып тыуалар. Улар аҡыл һәм выждан эйәһе һәм бер-береһенә ҡарата ҡәрҙәшлек рухында хәрәкәт итергә тейештәр.
Barlıq keşelər irekle, dərəjələre həm xoquqtarı tigeź bulıp tıwalar. Ular aqıl həm vıjdan eyəhe həm ber-berehenə qarata qərźəşlek ruxında xərəkət itergə teyeştər.
All human beings are born free and equal in dignity and rights. They are endowed with reason and conscience and should act towards one another in a spirit of brotherhood.
