= Siege of Moscow (1439) =

1439 battle between Khanate of Kazan and Muscovy (controlled by Vasily II)

- Part of First Russo-Kazan war (1437–1445)
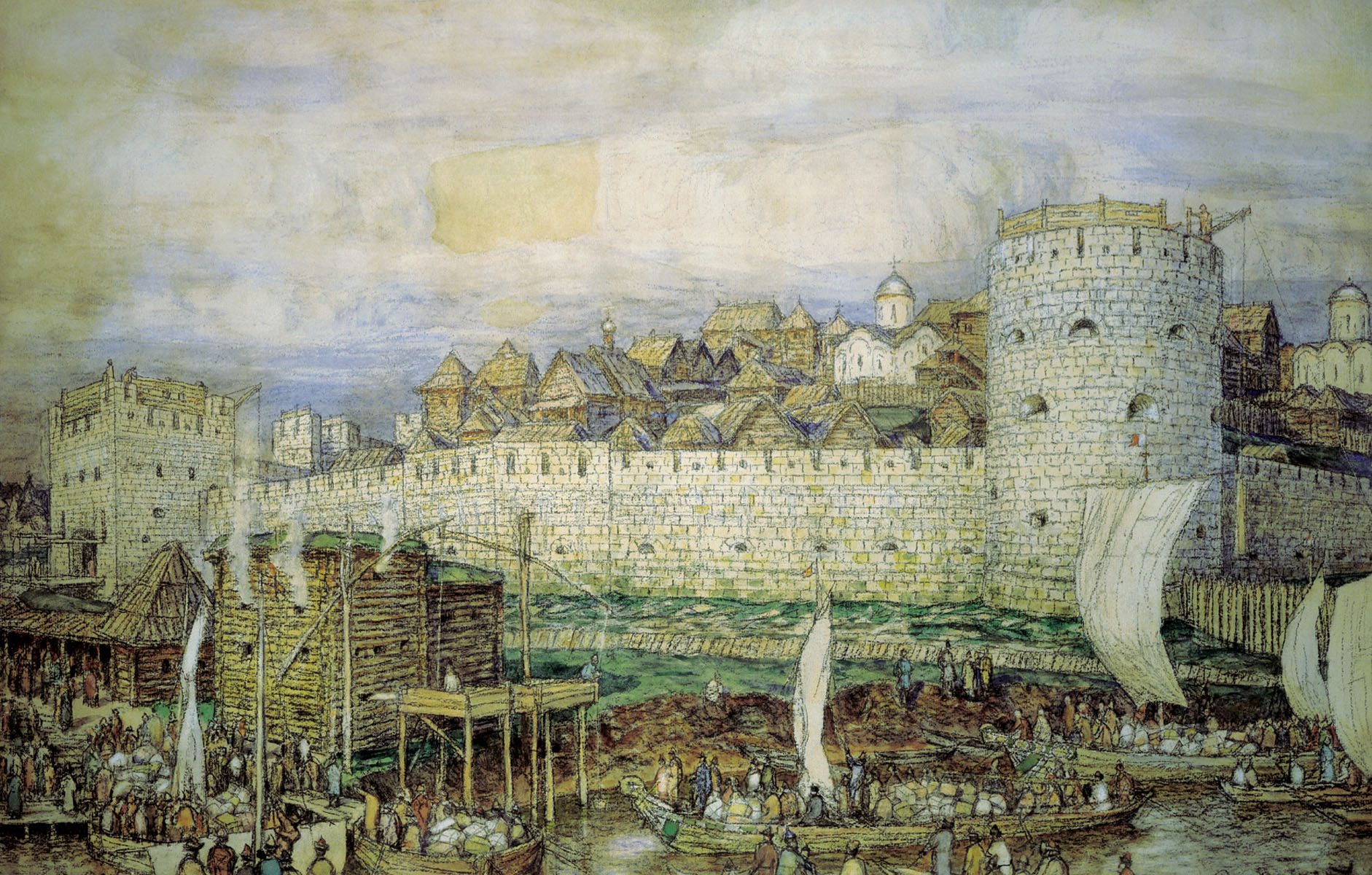
- Dmitry Donskoy's Kremlin in the painting by Apollinary Vasnetsov
Date	3–13 July 1439 year
Location	Moscow
Result	Russian victory: Retreat of Tatar army

Belligerents
Grand Duchy of Moscow	Kazan Khanate

Commanders and leaders
Yuri Patrikeevich	Ulugh Muhammad

The 1439 siege of Moscow was a ten-day siege of Moscow, then the capital city of the Grand Duchy of Moscow, by Ulugh Muhammad, the Tatar Khan of the Kazan Khanate, during the First Russo-Kazan war.

After defeating the troops of Vasily II in the Battle of Belyov, Ulugh Muhammad approached Moscow after a while. Vasily II left the city in the care of the voivodes, and he himself went to the Trans-Volga forests inaccessible to the Tatars. The defense of Moscow was entrusted to Yuri Patrikeevich, a native of the Grand Duchy of Lithuania, the brother-in-law of the Grand Duke. He proved himself a capable organizer. The Tatars' attacks on the white-stone Kremlin, built by Dmitry Donskoy, proved futile. As a result, the Tatars were forced to retreat, plundering the surrounding area and taking away many prisoners. On the way back, Ulugh Muhammad burned Kolomna.

After the departure of the Tatars, Vasily II returned from the Volga region, but settled for a while in Pereyaslavl-Zalessky, entrusting the management of Moscow to his cousin Dmitry Yuryevich Krasny. As the Ermolinsky Chronicle noted, the reason for the reluctance to return to Moscow immediately was that "the villages were burned from the Tatars, and people were whipped, and the stench was great from them." Historian Nikolai Borisov sees in the mention of this nuance a visual comparison of cruelty and indifference to the tragedy of Vasily II with the nobility and sorrow of Dmitry Donskoy described there, who buried the dead during the invasion of Tokhtamysh.
