= Ilham Ghali of Kazan =

Khan of the Kazan Khanate (r. 1479–1484, 1485–1487)

Ilham Ghali

Khan of the Tatar Kazan Khanate (1st reign)
- Reign: 1479 – 1484
- Predecessor: Ibrahim of Kazan
- Successor: Möxämmädämin of Kazan

Khan of the Tatar Kazan Khanate (2nd reign)
- Reign: 1485 – 1487
- Predecessor: Möxämmädämin of Kazan
- Successor: Möxämmädämin of Kazan
- Born: c. 1449
- Died: c. 1490 (aged 40–41); Vologda
- Spouse: Karakush Sultan and others
- Father: Ibrahim of Kazan
- Mother: Fatima Sultan
- Religion: Islam

Ilham (Volga Türki and Persian: الهام علی, Tatar: İlham Ğäli; c. 1449 – c. 1490) was Khan of the Kazan Khanate in 1479–1484 and 1485–1487.

== See also ==
- List of Kazan khans

Preceded by Ibrahim	Khan of Kazan; 1479–1484	Succeeded by Moxammat Amin
Preceded by Moxammat Amin	Khan of Kazan; 1485–1487	Succeeded by Moxammat Amin
