= First Russo-Kazan war (1437–1445) =

Conflict between the Kazan Khanate and the Grand Duchy of Moscow

First Russo-Kazan War 1437-1445
- Part of Russo-Kazan wars
Date	1437–1445
Location	Grand Duchy of Moscow
Result	Tatar victory

Belligerents
Kazan Khanate	Grand Duchy of Moscow

Commanders and leaders
Ulugh Muhammad	Vasily II of Moscow (POW)

The First Russo-Kazan War was a conflict between the Kazan Khanate and the Grand Duchy of Moscow.

== Course of hostilities ==
In 1437, the Khan of the Horde Ulugh-Mohammed was expelled from the Golden Horde and appeared with an army in the city of Belev (Now Belyov, Tula Oblast), in the upper reaches of the Oka. Wishing to have a good relationship with the new Khan, Grand Duke Vasily II of Moscow sent an army led by his cousins, the sons of his uncle, against Ulu-Muhammad Dmitry Yuryevich Shemyakoy and Dmitry Yuryevich Krasny (their father gave them the same name). On the first day, the brothers defeated the Tatars, and they tried to enter into negotiations with the Russians. Confident of their victory, the princes refused, but the next day, thanks to the betrayal of Ulugh-Mohammed, he defeated the Russian army. Ulugh-Mohammed did not linger in Russia, but went to the lands of the Bulgarian vilayet of the Golden Horde, to Kazan.

Having established itself in In the Middle Volga region, the khan decided to restore dominance over the Russian principalities. The khan began his raids on Russia in the spring of 1439. By taking Nizhny Novgorod, he approached Moscow and began its siege. However, the white-stone Kremlin remained impregnable. Ulugh-Mohammed burned the Moscow suburbs and retreated. On the way back, he plundered Russian lands, occupied and burned Kolomna.

At the end of 1444, he made a new campaign to Russia. Vasily II gathered large troops, but after the defeat of his advanced detachments, Ulugh-Mohammed retreated, besieging the fortress at Nizhny Novgorod, where the Voivodes Fedor Dolgolyadov and Yushka Dranitsa were located. At the end of spring, the Grand Duke began to prepare for a new offensive against the Tatars, but on June 29, the Voivodes rode up to him with the message: "that they ran out of the city at night, having lit it, because they could not endure hunger any longer: what was in the bread supply, everyone ate too much." Having learned about the fall of the city, the Grand Duke was forced to march without completing his preparations, some units did not have time to approach.

June 7, 1445 under Suzdal, a battle took place at the Spaso-Evfimev Monastery. Initially, the Russians were successful and began to pursue the enemy, but in the end they were defeated. The Grand Duke himself was captured. With a large ransom received, the Tatars retreated and released Vasily II in Kurmysh. The present conditions of release are unknown. Chroniclers cite completely different sizes of ransom. It is only known that the conditions were quite difficult, but it is not known how much the Grand Duke fulfilled them. The prince returned home accompanied by a large Tatar detachment.
