= Vasily Kholmsky =

Russian prince, boyar, military leader, and son-in-law of Ivan the Great

- Knyaz

Prince of Kholm
- Predecessor: Daniil Kholmsky
- Other titles: Voyevoda, boyar
- Born: c.1460s
- Died: 1524; Beloozero
- Wars and battles: Russo-Kazan Wars
- Offices: Boyar duma
- Noble family: Kholmsky
- Spouse: Feodosiya Ivanovna (d. 1501)
- Father: Daniil Dmitrievich

Vasily Danilovich Kholmsky (Russian: Василий Данилович Холмский; c.1460s–1524) was a Russian knyaz, Boyar and Muscovite voyevoda. He was the son of Prince Daniil Kholmsky and the son-in-law of Grand Prince Ivan III, having married his daughter Feodosiya Ivanovna. Kholmsky was a member of the princely house Kholmsky, and descended from the rulers of the Principality of Tver.

== Life ==
Vasily Kholmsky, a nobleman from Moscow, served as one of the commanders of the Big Regiment (Большой полк) during the Novgorod campaigns of 1492 and 1495. Recognizing Kholmsky's bravery in battle, Ivan III admitted him to the royal court and welcomed him to his circle of friends.

In 1500, Ivan arranged marriage between Vasily and Feodosiya Ivanovna, the second daughter of the Grand Duke (Ivan the Great). However, she died on 19 February the following year.

Shortly thereafter, Ivan gave Vasily the title of Boyar. In 1502, Vasily Kholmsky and Dmitry Ivanovich, son of Ivan III, fought against the Lithuanians in the Smolensk region.

In 1505-1506 Kholmsky resumed command of the Big Regiment and was ordered to defend Murom and Nizhny Novgorod. A year later, he suffered a crushing defeat at the hands of the Tatars near Kazan. He was soon sent there again with a large force to subdue the city's inhabitants. In September of that year, Kholmsky defeated the Lithuanian army at Mstislavl, Polotsk, and other places.

In 1509, Lithuania launched another invasion of Muscovy and emerged victorious against the Moscow forces. Upon hearing the news, Kholmsky's troops, stationed in Mozhaisk at the time, immediately mobilized and defeated the Lithuanian army at Vyazma. Kholmsky then marched on Dorogobuzh, which was occupied by Polish voivode Stanislaw Kiszka. Kholmsky defeated Kiszka's army and forced him to flee to Smolensk. In pursuit of the Polish voivode, Vasily Kholmsky captured Dorogobuzh and Starodub before moving on to Bryansk.

Suddenly, Vasili III summoned him to Moscow and exiled him to Beloozero, where Vasily Kholmsky died in a dungeon 15 years later.
