= Möxämmät-Ämin =

Khan of the Kazan Khanate (r. 1484–1485, 1487–1495, 1502–1518)

Möxämmät-Ämin xan محمد أمين خان Muḥammad ʾĀmīn Khān
- Khan of Kazan
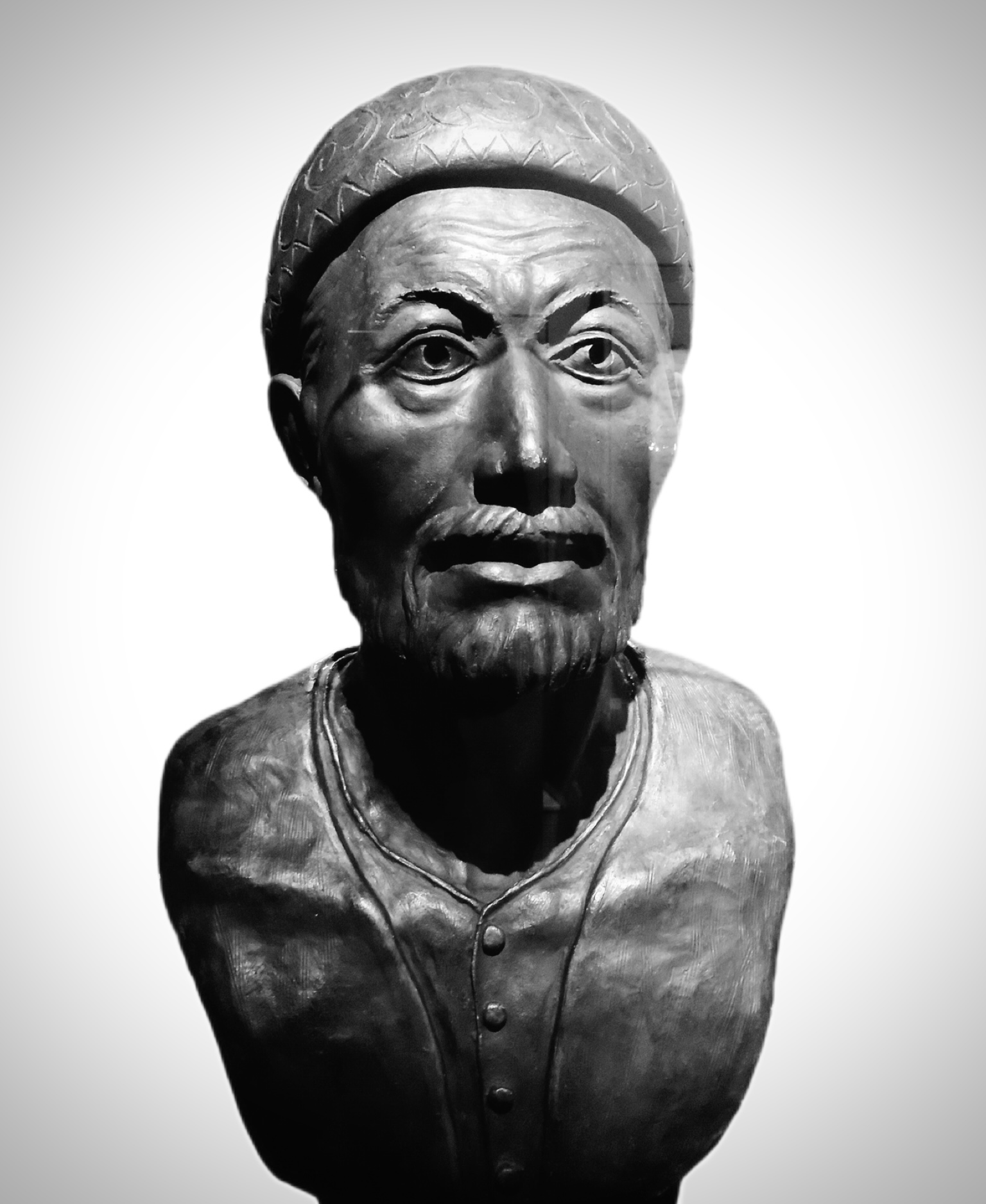

Khan of the Tatar Kazan Khanate (1st reign)
- Reign: 1484 – 1485
- Predecessor: Ilham Ghali of Kazan
- Successor: Ilham Ghali of Kazan

Khan of the Tatar Kazan Khanate (2nd reign)
- Reign: 1487 – 1495
- Predecessor: Ilham Ghali of Kazan
- Successor: Mamuq of Kazan

Khan of the Tatar Kazan Khanate (3rd reign)
- Reign: 1502 – 1518
- Predecessor: Ghabdellatif of Kazan
- Successor: Shahghali
- Born: c. 1469
- Died: 1518 (aged 48–49)
- Spouse: Şäwliäbikä
- Issue: Möxämmädyar
- Father: Ibrahim of Kazan
- Mother: Nur Sultan

Möxämmät-Ämin (Volga Türki and Persian: محمد امین خان, Russian: Мухаммед-Амин / Магмед-Аминь, romanized: Mukhammed-Amin / Magmed-Amin; c. 1469–1518) was a three-time Khan of the Khanate of Kazan. During his first reign, he actively supported the policies of the grand prince of Moscow and proved himself to be "a true friend of Russia". He was also known as a poet; excerpts from his works have survived to this day. After ascending the throne for the second time, he changed his political views, emphasizing the independence of the khans. Muhammad Amin "enjoyed the love and respect of the people"; Kazan flourished under him. Muhammad Amin's remains were discovered in Soviet era and were buried in the Kazan Kremlin in 2016.

== Life ==
=== Family ===
His father, khan Ibrahim of Kazan (r. 1467–1479), had at least two wives. His first wife was the Nogai princess Fatima who gave birth to khan Ilham Ghali of Kazan (r. 1479–1484, 1485–1487). Another wife was Nur Soltan, daughter of the Nogai Timur, who had been married to Ibraham’s brother and predecessor, khan Xälil of Kazan (r. 1466–1467) and after his death married Crimean khan Mengli Ghirai (r. 1478–1515). She gave birth to Muhammad Amin and his younger brother khan Ghabdellatif of Kazan (r. 1496–1502).

In 1479, Möxämmädämin's father, khan Ibrahim of Kazan, died and the pro-Russian party in his court supported the 10-year old Möxämmädämin while the eastern or anti-Russian party wanted Möxämmädämin's elder half-brother Ilham. Ilham took the throne with Nogai help and Möxämmädämin fled or was taken to Moscow where he was given the fief of Kashira.

=== First reign, 1484–1485 ===
In 1482, Ivan III sent an army against Ilham, but an arrangement was made and the Muscovite army went home. This was the first military campaign in which the Muscovite army had cannons. In 1484, Muscovy sent another army and Ilham was deposed, leading Möxämmädämin to be installed in his place. Möxämmädämin was probably too young to be an effective ruler and a year later Ilham returned to the throne with the support of a Russian army.

In 1485–1487, a group of Kazan nobles sent a letter to Ivan III saying: "We released Mahmet-Amin to you in case if Aleham does us foul, you would let Mahmet-Amin back to us. When Aleham found out of this, he asked as to a feast where tried to slay us, but we ran to the steppe." Ivan III sent another army to Kazan. Kazan was besieged in April 1487 and fell on 9 July. Ilham was arrested and exiled to Vologda, where he soon died. His wife and children were sent to Beloozero. A number of nobles were executed.

=== Second reign, 1487–1495 ===
Subsequently, Möxammädämin was installed as khan again. Although the khanate remained formally independent, Ivan III started to use the title Duke of Bulgaria among his other titles and closely monitored Möxammädämin during his reign. Möxammädämin corresponded with the Crimean Khanate, but all correspondence was sent through Moscow and translated into Russian for Ivan III to read. In 1491, when the Great Horde attempted to invade the Crimean Khanate, Kazan troops participated in a raid against it, together with Muscovy, the Qasim Khanate, and the Nogays.

1495-1502: In 1495, the "eastern" or Nogai faction called in Mamuq, a Shaibanid from the Siberian khanate. Möxämmädämin called in a Russian army and Mamuq drew back, but when the Russians returned home Mamuq seized Kazan and Möxämmädämin fled to Moscow. In 1496, when Mamuq returned from a raid on Arsk, the city closed its gates and Mamuq was forced to return to Siberia. This time the qarachi and particularly Qol Axmat objected to the return of Möxämmädämin, citing "abuse and dishonor to women" from him. The throne was given to his younger brother Ghabdellatif of Kazan. In 1502 Ghabdellatif was removed by Russia and a local faction.

=== Third reign, 1502–1518 ===
Subsequently, Möxämmädämin again became khan, put Qol Axmat to death and married the widow of his brother Ilham. His new wife turned him against Moscow. In June 1505 he slaughtered the Russian merchants who had gathered for the annual fair and confiscated their goods. He marched west and burned the outskirts of Nizhny Novgorod but could not take the city because the local commander had armed 300 Lithuanian prisoners of war and gathered them to defend the city. Möxämmädämin abandoned the siege because of a quarrel with his Nogai allies and returned home and the Russians did not follow him. In 1506 two armies were sent. The first went by water, attacked too soon and was defeated. The second arrived unexpectedly, almost won, but fell to looting and was destroyed by a counter attack. A third army was sent, but Kazan offered peace, which was accepted. In 1510 his mother Nur Soltan went from Crimea to Moscow and Kazan and improved relations between the two powers. Möxämmädämin died in 1519 after a difficult illness. Since he left no children the throne went to Shahghali of the Qasim Khanate.

Möxammädämin was also a prominent Old Tatar language poet. His son Möxämmädyar, born from his wife Şäwliäbikä, also was one of the most prominent Tatar poets.

== See also ==
- List of Kazan khans
- Russo-Kazan Wars

== Sources ==
- Kołodziejczyk, Dariusz (2011). The Crimean Khanate and Poland-Lithuania: International Diplomacy on the European Periphery (15th-18th Century). A Study of Peace Treaties Followed by Annotated Documents. Leiden: Brill. ISBN 9789004191907.
- Henry Hoyle Howorth, History of the Mongols,1880, Part 2, pp 376-385

Preceded by İlham	Khan of Kazan; 1484–1485	Succeeded by İlham
Preceded by İlham	Khan of Kazan; 1487–1495	Succeeded by Mamuq
Preceded by Ghabdellatif	Khan of Kazan; 1502–1518	Succeeded by Shahgali
