= Tuksanbayevo =

Tuksanbayevo Туксанбаево
- Village
- Location within Bashkortostan Location within Russia
- Coordinates: 53°33′N 54°25′E
- Country: Russia
- Region: Bashkortostan
- District: Miyakinsky District
- Time zone: UTC+5:00

Tuksanbayevo (Russian: Туксанбаево; Bashkir: Туҡһанбай, Tuqhanbay) is a rural locality (a village) in Yenebey-Ursayevsky Selsoviet, Miyakinsky District, Bashkortostan, Russia. The population was 128 as of 2010. There are 4 streets.

== Geography ==
Tuksanbayevo is located 41 km southwest of Kirgiz-Miyaki (the district's administrative centre) by road. Safarovo is the nearest rural locality.
