= Ural-Volga Turki =

Literary language formerly used by Bashkirs and Tatars

- ترکی
- Region: Volga region, Ural region, Turkistan, Western Siberia
- Ethnicity: Bashkirs, Tatars
- Era: from the middle of the 13th century to the beginning of the 20th century developed into Tatar and Bashkir
- Language family: Turkic: Common Turkic; Kipchak; North Kipchak; Ural-Volga Turki
- Writing system: Chagatai script

Language codes
- ISO 639-3: –

The Ural-Volga Turki (Old Bashkir or Old Tatar) language was a literary language used by some ethnic groups of the Idel-Ural region (Tatars and Bashkirs) from the middle of the 13th century to the beginning of the 20th century.

Ural-Volga Turki is a member of the Kipchak (or Northwestern) group of Turkic languages. The first poem, considered to be written by Qul Ghali in Ural-Volga Turki dates back to the period of Volga Bulgaria and Ancient Bashkortostan. It included many Persian and Arabic loans.

In its written form, the language was spelled uniformly among different ethnic groups, speaking different Turkic languages of the Kipchak sub-group. The pronunciation differed from one people to another, approximating to the spoken language, making the written form universal for different languages.

The language formerly used Arabic script and its later updated alphabets of İske imlâ and Yaña imlâ. Ural-Volga Turki language was a language of Idel-Ural poetry and literature. Along with Ottoman Turkish, Azeri, Khaqani Turkic and Chagatai, it was one of the few Turkic literary languages used in the Middle Ages. It was actively used in publishing until 1905, when the first Tatar and Bashkir newspapers begun to be published in modern Tatar and Bashkir language.

== Alphabet ==
	Name	Isolated	Final	Medial	Initial	Modern Cyrillic Bashkir alphabet	Modern Latin Bashkir alphabet	IPA	Notes
1	әлеп (әлиф) мәддә əlip (əlif) məddə	آ	ـا		آ	а	a	ɑ	
2	әлеп (әлиф) əlip (əlif)	ا	–		ا	ә, э, ы, и	ə, i, ı, e	æ, ɪ̆, ɤ̆, e	
3	бей biy	ب	ـب	ـبـ	بـ	б	b	b	
4	пей piy	پ	ـپ	ـپـ	پـ	п	p	p	
5	тей tiy	ت	ـت	ـتـ	تـ	т	t	t	Before front towels
6	сей siy	ث	ـث	ـثـ	ثـ	с, ҫ	s, ś	s, θ	Only in borrowings from Arabic, and in Bashkir words in 19th century modification
7	жем jim	ج	ـج	ـجـ	جـ	ж, й	j, y	ʒ, j	
8	сем sim	چ	ـچ	ـچـ	چـ	ш, с	ş, s	ɕ, s	
9	хей xiy	ح	ـح	ـحـ	حـ	х	x	χ	Only in borrowings from Arabic
10	хый xıy	خ	ـخ	ـخـ	خـ	х	x	χ	
11	дал dal	د	ـد		د	д	d	d	
12	зал zal	ذ	ـذ		ذ	з, ҙ	z, ź	z, ð	Only in Arabic loanwords, and in Bashkir words in 19th century modification
13	рей riy	ر	ـر		ر	р	r	ɾ	
14	зей ziy	ز	ـز		ز	з	z	z	
15	жей jiy	ژ	ـژ		ژ	ж	j	ʒ	Only in Persian, French and Russian borrowings
16	сен sin	س	ـس	ـسـ	سـ	с, ҫ	s, ś	s, θ	Before front vowels
17	шен şin	ش	ـش	ـشـ	شـ	ш	ş	ʃ	
18	сад sad	ص	ـص	ـصـ	صـ	с, ҫ	s, θ	s	Before back vowels
19	дад, зад dad, zad	ض	ـض	ـضـ	ضـ	д, з	d, z	d, z	Only in borrowings from Arabic
20	та ta	ط	ـط	ـطـ	طـ	т	t	t	Before back vowels
21	за za	ظ	ـظ	ـظـ	ظـ	з, ҙ	z, ð	z, ð	Only in borrowings from Arabic
22	ғәйн ğəyn	ع	ـع	ـعـ	عـ	ғ	ğ	ʁ	Only in borrowings from Arabic
23	ғайн ğayn	غ	ـغ	ـغـ	غـ	ғ	ğ	ʁ	
24	фей fiy	ف	ـف	ـفـ	فـ	ф	f	ɸ	
25	ҡаф qaf	ق	ـق	ـقـ	قـ	ҡ	q	q	
26	каф kaf	ك/ ک	ـك/ ـک	ـكـ	كـ	к	k	k	
27	гаф gaf	گ	ـگ	ـگـ	گـ	г	g	g	
28	һаңғырау каф hañğıraw kaf	ڭ/ نک	ـڭ/ ـنک	ـڭـ/ ـنکـ	—	ң	ñ	ŋ	Initial form was never used due to phonetic reasons
29	ләм ləm	ل	ـل	ـلـ	لـ	л	l	l	
30	мим mim	م	ـم	ـمـ	مـ	м	m	m	
31	нон nun	ن	ـن	ـنـ	نـ	н	n	n	
32	һей hiy	ه	ـه/ ـہ	ـهـ/ ـہـ	هـ	һ, ә	h, æ	h, æ	
33	вау waw	و	ـو		و	в, у, о, ө, ү	w, o, u, ü, ö	w/o, ʊ̆/ʏ̆, ɵ, u	Alternative Cyrillic transcription: ў, у, о
34	вей viy	ۋ	ـۋ		ۋ	в	v	β	Only in borrowings from European languages
35	ей yiy	ی/ے	ـی/ ـے	ـیـ	یـ	й, и, э, ы	y, e, i, ı	j, e, ɪ̆, ɤ̆	

In many publications from the late 19th and early 20th centuries, the letter ۇ is used to represent the sound /ʊ̆/ or /ʏ̆/.

== Bibliography ==
- "Eski Başqurt Əzəbiy Tili/Иҫке башҡорт әҙәби теле". Tatar Encyclopaedia (in Tatar). Kazan: The Republic of Tatarstan Academy of Sciences. Institution of the Tatar Encyclopaedia. 2002.

== See also ==
- Chagatai language
- Bashkir language
- Tatar language
