= Battle of Olshanitsa =

1527 battle

- Part of the Crimean–Nogai slave raids in Eastern Europe
Date	January 27, 1527
Location	Near Olshanitsa (Bila Tserkva Raion, Kiev Oblast) 49°40′N 30°37′E
Result	Lithuanian victory

Belligerents
Grand Duchy of Lithuania	Crimean Khanate

Commanders and leaders
Konstanty Ostrogski; Jerzy Radziwiłł; Ostap Dashkevych; Yuri I Olelkovich	Sahib I Giray

Strength
7,000	

The Battle of Olshanitsa was fought on January 27, 1527, between the armies of the Grand Duchy of Lithuania and Crimean Khanate. It was the last large raid into the Grand Duchy. It was also the last large victory of the Great Hetman Konstanty Ostrogski before his death in 1530.

In 1524, İslâm I Giray, son of Mehmed I Giray, raided Poland–Lithuania and upon return started an open war for the throne with his uncle and new Khan Saadet I Giray. The parties reconciled in 1526 and the Khanate launched a large raid into Polesia of the Grand Duchy of Lithuania (present-day northern Ukraine and southern Belarus) in December 1526. The Lithuanian-Ruthenian army, commanded by Konstanty Ostrogski, pursued the invaders and soundly defeated them at Olshanitsa (Ольшаниця), a village south of Kiev. Remaining Tatars were defeated by Ostap Dashkevych and Yuri Olelkovich near Kaniv and Cherkasy.

After the battle, the GDL released Khan Sheikh Ahmed, the deposed Khan of the Golden Horde, who was imprisoned for more than twenty years. Sheikh Ahmed, an enemy of the Crimean Khanate, was used by the Grand Duchy of Lithuania as a bargaining chip in negotiations against the Crimean Tatars. After these events both Saadet I Giray and İslâm I Giray sent letters to Sigismund I the Old of Poland–Lithuania offering peace and an alliance against the Grand Duchy of Moscow. The plans, however, were interrupted by renewed internal disagreements within the Crimean Khanate.

The battle was described by Justus Ludwik Decjusz in Sendbrief von der grossen Schlacht.
