= Crimean invasion of Russia (1521) =

1521 invasion of Muscovy

Invasion of Muscovy
- Part of Russo-Crimean Wars
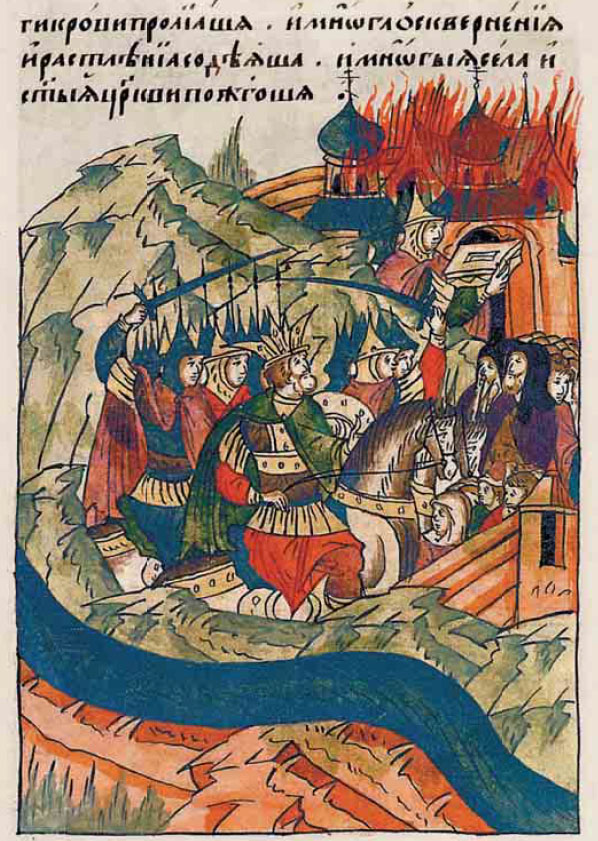
- Tatar invasion of Russia in 1521
Date	1521
Location	Moscow, Principality of Moscow
Result	Crimean coalition victory: Vasili III of Russia signs a treaty formalising his status as a tributary of the Crimean Khanate; Khan lost the Vasily's charter and Muscovy got rid of its tributary status

Belligerents
Crimean Khanate; Ottoman Empire; Zaporozhian Cossacks; Grand Duchy of Lithuania; Nogai Horde; Khanate of Kazan (Circassia) Circassians	Principality of Moscow

Commanders and leaders
Mehmed I Giray; Suleiman I Ostap Dashkevych; Sahib I Giray	Vasily III; Ivan Andreevich Sheremetyev †; Vladimir Mikhailovich Karamyshev-Kurbsky †; Yuri Mikhailovich Zamyatnin †; Yakov Mikhailovich Zamyatnin †; Fyodor Vasilyevich Lopata-Obolensky (POW); Ivan Khabar-Simsky

Units involved
100,000; Modern sources: 30,000–35,000: 20,000–25,000; 300	35,000–40,000 or 50,000

Casualties and losses
Unknown	Heavy; ~30,000 enslaved

The Invasion of Muscovy occurred in the year 1521. The invasion of Muscovy was led by Mehmed I Giray of the Crimean Khanate, a vassal of the Ottoman Empire.

== Background ==
In 1521 the Khan of the Crimean Khanate, Mehmed I Giray, prepared a great invasion of Russia. The ruler of Kazan was despised by his people and Mehmed Giray took advantage of this, he seized the city and appointed his brother as its ruler. Having seized Kazan, Mehmed Giray collected a great force and began his advance towards Muscovy. The Crimean invasion army was supported by the forces of Ostap Dashkevych.

== Battle ==
He met Vasili at the banks of the Oka river and crushed the Russian army. Mehmeds brother Shihab Giray joined him at Kolomna massacring people and desecrating churches as he advanced. The monastery of St Nicholas was burnt as well as the village of Ostrof which was Vasili's favourite residence. The Crimean Tatars, now drunken off the hydromel in Vasili's cellars, overlooked Moscow. Vasili reportedly humiliated himself, he was forced to pay tribute and made to sign a treaty formalising his status as dependent on and a tributary of the Crimean Khanate. The Tatar general reportedly built his own statue in Moscow and made Vasili prostrate before it.

== Aftermath ==
Following the submission of Vasilli, Mehmed Giray withdrew, reportedly in 1523 after news of an offensive against Crimea by the Astrakhan Khanate. During his withdrawal Mehmed was attacked by the cannonballs of the governor of Riazan who took the humiliating treaty from him, however 30,000 prisoners were taken to Kaffa and sold to the Turks.
