= Tagany Rog =

Cape near Taganrog Bay of Azov Sea

Coordinates: 47°12′16″N 38°56′33″E

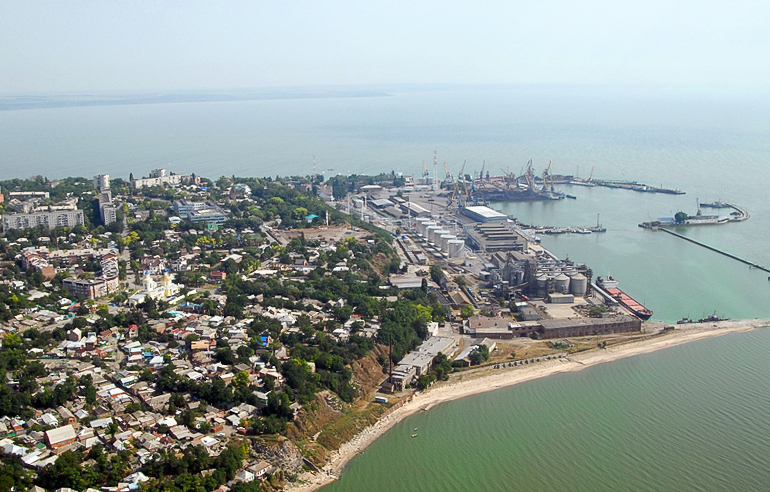
Tagany Rog and the Port of Taganrog

Tagany Rog (Russian: Таганий Рог) is a cape situated at the northern part of Taganrog Bay of Azov Sea. It is also the place of the old part of Taganrog city, which itself was named after the cape.

== Description ==
Some sources claim that "Tagany Rog" means "high cape" in Tatar language. Another possible interpretation for the name is "fire on the cape," hinting at the existence of a lighthouse for seafarers in ancient times.

The first mention of Cape Tagany Rog dates back to 6 September 1489, when the Grand Duke of Moscow Ivan III sent two letters: one to Crimean Khan Mengli I Giray and another to Taman Prince Zaccaria de Guizolfi. The letter to Zaccaria contained information about a secret meeting location between their representatives: "And we will already, if God wills it, send our people to you in the spring, so order your people to wait for you at the mouth of Miyush and on the Taigan."

The construction of the harbor and fortress at Tagany Rog began on the orders of Peter I in 1696, after the capture of Azov.

=== In popular culture ===
In 2002, a printing house named Tagany Rog (Таганiй Рогъ in old Russian orthography) was established in Taganrog. It produces a weekly newspaper for free private ads "Stone Stairs," among other projects.
