= Siege of Cherkasy =

- Part of the Crimean-Nogai slave raids in Eastern Europe
Date	c. March 1532
Location	Cherkasy castle, Right-Bank Ukraine
Result	Cossack victory

Belligerents
Zaporozhian Cossacks	Crimean Khanate; Ottoman Empire

Commanders and leaders
Ostap Dashkevych	Saadet I Giray

Strength
400–600	8,500 Tatars (Ottoman Empire) 1,500 Janissaries

The siege of Cherkasy or siege of Cherkassy (Note: Ukrainian: Облога Черкас Turkish: Çerkası Kuşatması Crimean Tatar: Çerkası Qamalı) was conducted by the Crimean Tatar army of Saadet I Giray in cooperation with Ottoman Janissaries as part of the attack in response to raids of Ostap Dashkevych's Cossacks, on c. March 1532.

== Prelude ==
During the period of Crimean-Nogai slave raids in Eastern Europe, Cherkassy played an important role as a defense from Tatar raiders. Saadet I Giray intended to establish relations with Grand Duke Sigismund I. The Cossack Kosh Otaman, Ostap Dashkevych occasionally cooperated with the Crimean Khanate, but more often raided Tatars.

Dashkevych's raids eventually provoked the Crimean Khan to attack Cherkasy. Crimean attack turned into a 30-day siege of the Cherkasy castle. The date of the siege is unclear, either taking place from late February to early April or during March.

== Siege ==
Dashkevych was informed of the incoming Tatar army, reacting quickly. Cossacks and townspeople gathered in the Cherkasy castle before the settlement was destroyed in a Tatar attack, as was the bridge connecting castle with the town. Dashkevych organised a defense and requested assistance, but the Lithuanian army wasn't going to arrive until the end of the month.

The condition of Cherkasy fortress during the siege was poor. However, the castle's favourable position made it possible to resist the attackers. It made it deadly for the Khan to use Tatar cavalry in this battle. Ataman Dashkevych had 400-600 people under his command, while Khan Saadet led 10,000 troops, including 1,500 Janissaries.

Khan Saadet with thousands of troops and support of artillery encircled the Cherkasy castle. Tatar forces first tried to take the castle by storm, but were repelled. Khan then changed the strategy to starving out the defenders and then shelling them from cannons. In response, Dashkevych carried out successful sorties on the besiegers. The strategy of attrition on the besieged proved to be ineffective and Khan Saadet was unable to defeat the castle's garrison.

== Aftermath ==
Dashkevych's forces withstood the siege and repelled the attacks. Khan Saadet lifted the siege when the Lithuanian naval forces approached. Khan didn't want to risk heavy losses among elite troops, which contributed to the decision to retreat. At the same time, the failure to capture Cherkasy castle undermined Saadet's position as Khan, renouncing his position on May 1532. Saadet was replaced by Sahib I Giray as Khan.

== See also ==
- History of Cherkasy Oblast

== Bibliography ==
- Penscoy, V.V. "Черкасское «сидение»" (PDF). reenactor.ru (in Russian). Belgorod.
- Lastovskyi, Valerii (2021). "До питання про облогу Черкас у 1532 р." (PDF). shron1.chtyvo.org.ua (in Ukrainian). Kyiv: Київський національний університет культури і мистецтв.
