= Sport by the Whole Wide World =

National award and festival "Sport by the Whole Wide World"
- Current: 2nd National Award and Festival "Sport by the Whole Wide World. From the Bottom of the Heart"
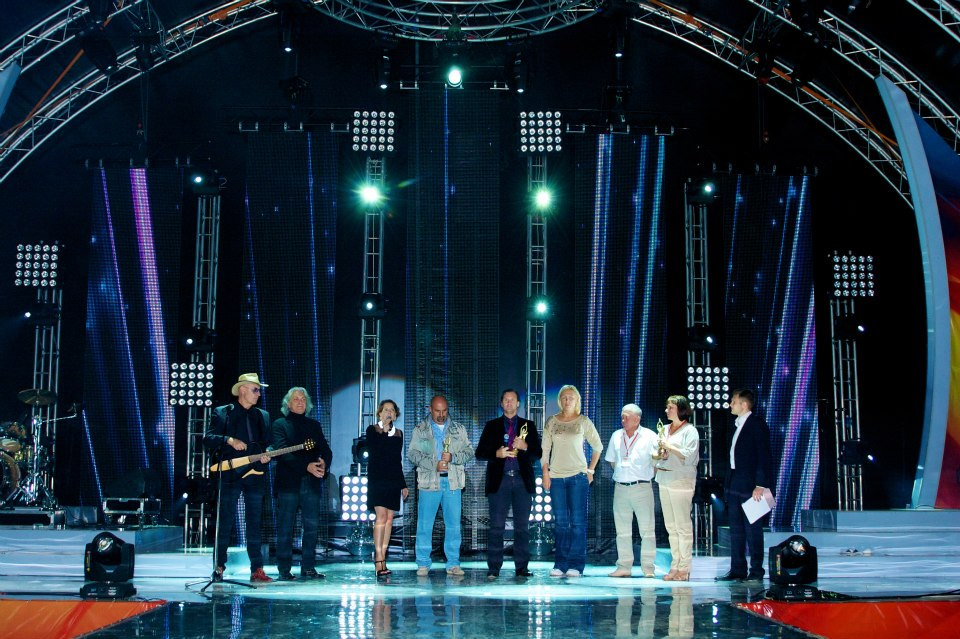
- Natascha Ragosina and Riccardo Fogli presenting awards to heroes of salvation operations in Krymsk and Costa Concordia disaster
- Awarded for: courage and heroism
- Sponsored by: PIK Group
- Date: September 15, 2012
- Location: Pushkin Embankment, Taganrog
- Country: Russia
- Presented by: Nikolai Valuev, Natascha Ragosina, Svetlana Zhurova, Riccardo Fogli, Sergei Trofimov
- Hosted by: ru:Корчевников, Борис Вячеславович
- Reward: figurine
- First award: 2012
- Final award: Active
- Website: www.sportvm.ru

Television/radio coverage
- Network: CTC (TV channel)
- Produced by: Igor Isakov
- Directed by: ru:Иншаков, Александр Иванович

Sport by the Whole Wide World is an event in Taganrog, Russia to present annual awards to recognize people worldwide for their heroic and courageous deeds, saving lives in difficult situations.

== History ==
The festival was established in 2012.

September 15, 2012 the organizers awarded the guests - heroes of salvation operations at Krymsk, at Costa Concordia disaster, in South Ossetia and distinguished policemen of Rostov Oblast.

The next upcoming festival is to be held in Taganrog on August 31, 2013.

== Famous presenters of the awards ==
Among the famous presenters of the awards in 2012 were: Nikolai Valuev, Natascha Ragosina, Svetlana Zhurova, Riccardo Fogli, Sergei Trofimov, Uliana Donskova, Tatiana Gorbunova.

== External links and references ==
- Official web site of the event
