= Haji I Giray =

1st Khan of Crimea from 1441 to 1456

Khan of Crimea
- 1st reign: 1441–1456
- Predecessor: Sayid Ahmad I
- Successor: Hayder Giray
- 2nd reign: 1456–1466
- Predecessor: Hayder Giray
- Successor: Nur Devlet
- Born: 30 November 1397; Lida, Grand Duchy of Lithuania
- Died: August 1466 (aged 68–69); Crimea, Crimean Khanate
- Burial: Bakhchysarai, Crimea
- Issue: Devletyar; Nur Devlet; Hayder; Uz-Temur; Meñli; Kutluk-Zaman; Kildysh; Yamgurchi
- Dynasty: Tuqa Timurid branch of House of Jochi later the Giray dynasty
- Father: Giyaseddin
- Religion: Sunni Islam
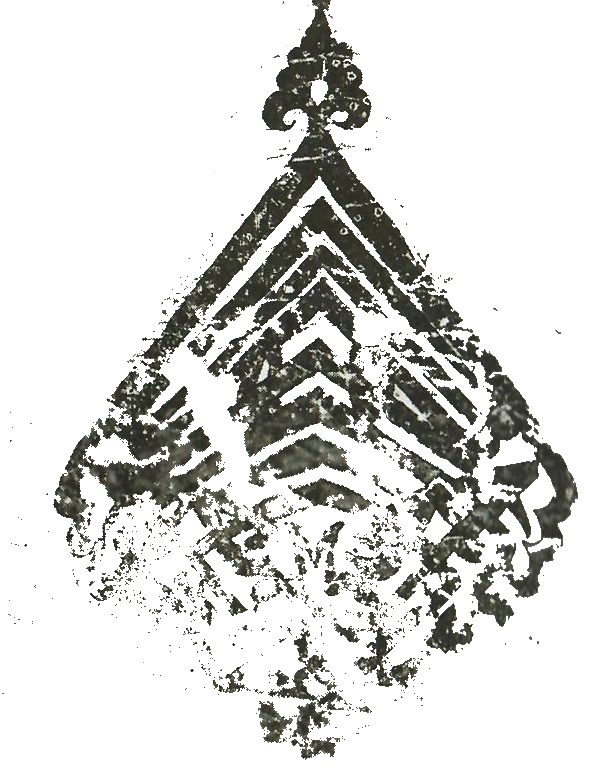
- Seal

Haji I Giray (Note: Crimean Tatar, Ottoman Turkish and Persian: حاجی کرای ,خاجی کرای) (1397–1466) was the founder of the Crimean Khanate and the Giray dynasty of Crimea ruling from c. 1441 until his death in 1466. As the Golden Horde was breaking up, he established himself in Crimea and spent most of his life fighting off other warlords. He was usually allied with the Lithuanians. His name has many spellings, such as Haji-Girei and Melek Haji Girai (Crimean Tatar: Bır Hacı Geray, بیر-خاجى كراى; Melek Hacı Geray, ملک خاجى كراى).

He is said to have introduced the new state symbol, taraq tamğa, or "the trident of the Girays", which is derived from the scales insignia of the Golden Horde. A contemporary European source, The Chronicle of Dlugosz, described him as a person of outstanding personal values and an effective governor.

== Origin of the Girays ==
Crimean Tatar national flag with golden Taraq Tamğa

Milner (1855) tells this story. His original name was Devlet, and he was called Haji, although there seems to be no evidence that he had made the Hajj. As a boy, when his family was defeated, he was protected by a shepherd. When he grew powerful, he asked the old shepherd what reward he wanted. The man replied that Haji Devlet should take the shepherd's name of Giray.

An early ancestor was Togay Timur, a younger son of Jochi. According to historical record, the story of the Girays begins with Öreng Timur, son of Togay Timur, receiving Crimea from Mengu-Timur.

Haji's grandfather was Tash-Timur bin Cansı and his father was Gyyas-ed-Din (Гыяс-эд-Дин, Gıyaseddin). Tash-Timur minted coins in Crimea in 1394/95 (=A.H. 797), which might imply some degree of independence. During one of Tamerlane's wars (1395?) Tash-Timur was driven from Crimea. His sons Gyyas-ed-Din and Devlet-Berdi fled to Lithuania. Haji was born in 1397, probably at Trakai. The brothers supported Tokhtamysh against Edigu and in one of these battles Gyyas-ed-Din was killed. It is said that a servant of Gyyas-ed-Din hid Haji for six years. After Edigu's death in 1419, Devlet-Berdi and his nephew Haji Giray established themselves in Crimea. In 1427 Devlet-Berdi captured Sarai, but was killed by 'Borak' (?Barak Khan).

== Gaining Crimea (1428–1441) ==
- For reference, in 1428 Haji was at the steppe, Crimea in 1429, the steppe in 1431, Crimea in 1434, hostage in Lithuania in 1441, Crimea in 1442, the steppe, and then Crimea once again in 1449.
- At this time the steppe was being contested by Ulugh Muhammad, Küchük Muhammad (Big and Little Muhammad) and Sayid Ahmad I, a grandson of Tokhtamysh near the Don. Barak Khan was east of the Volga.
- Crimea was held by the following: 1419: Ulugh, 1427 Devlet Berdi, 1428 Haji, c1429 Ulugh, 1431: Haji, 1434: Ulugh, 1437: Kuchuk, 1438?: Sayid, 1441: Haji, 1442: Sayid, then no clear ruler, 1447: Haji and thereafter the Giray dynasty.

According to Vasary, in 1426/27 Crimea was ruled by Ulugh Mohammad and by March 1427 by Devlet Berdi.

In 1428, Haji took over Crimea with the support of 16,000 men, derived from the support of Vytautas of Lithuania and the Shirin mirzas. He took Solkhat/Stary Krym and Kyrk-Er/Chufut-Kale. Once Ulugh Muhammad launched his invasion of the area, many nobles changed sides, including the Shirin chief Tegene-Bey. As a result, Haji fled to the steppes and then finally Lithuania. In 1431 Haji returned with troops raised in the Lithuanian lands. Tegene-Bey joined him at Perekop. Both Ulugh and Küchük failed to drive him out.

In 1433, Haji allied with Prince Alexios I of the Principality of Theodoro. That fall Alexios took the Genoese port of Cembalo/Balaklava. In the summer of 1434 the Genoese returned with a fleet and captured Balaklava and Alexios. They then took Kalamita/Inkerman and moved inland, but were defeated by Haji near Stary Krym. When Haji besieged Kaffa, the Genoese paid a ransom and recognized him as Khan.

In 1434, Ulugh Mohammad once again invaded Crimea, the Shirins changed sides, and Haji fled to the Lithuanian lands to gather a new army. Sigismund Kęstutaitis decided to hold him hostage and gave him a castle at Lida. In 1437, Ulugh was driven out by Kuchuk Mohammad. Soon Sayid Ahmad I gained Crimea. He became unpopular when his officials greatly increased taxes and nomads several times raided the peninsula. Around 1440 the Crimean nobles asked Casimir IV Jagiellon of Lithuania to release Haji. He went to Kiev, met the Beys and went to Crimea with a large army joined by Radvila Astikas (the founder of the Radziwills) and drove out Sayid's governor. Tegene-Bey of the Shirins then swore his allegiance.

== Reign (1441–1466) ==
In March 1441, Genoese sources name him as the new khan. In that year he minted coins with his name at Chufut-Kale, so 1441 is often taken as the official start of his reign and the foundation of the Crimean Khanate. Other possible dates are 1428 (above) and 1449 (below). Vasary says that the traditionally accepted date is August 1449.

In 1442, the Genoese consul at Kaffa allied with Sayid and the Genoese republic sent troops. Haji defeated the Genoese and an arrangement was made. At the same time Sayid invaded and took Solkhat. The Shinins changed sides and Haji fled to the Dnieper. Sayid collected tribute and burned Solkhat which cost him local support. Sayid returned to the steppes. While Sayid was fighting on the Don Haji entrenched himself at Perekop. He tried to capture Sayid's steppe subjects and failed. Sayid's governor failed to break thru Perekop. Haji strengthened Perekop and awaited an attack.

In 1445, Sayid unsuccessfully besieged Perekop. He retreated, was defeated, lost many men and horses and fled beyond the Don. Haji, supported by the Shirins and Baryns entered Crimea and became khan (in August 1449?).

Haji allied with Alexios I of Theodoro (1410–1447), gave him financial and military support and sent troops to help him re-take Kalamita/Inkerman from the Genoese. His son Meñli I Giray lived in Alexios's court and Alexios's heir was brought up in Stary Krim with Haji's children.

Since he was fighting the steppe warlords he was necessarily a friend of the Lithuanians. In 1452, Sayid made a deep raid into Podolia almost as far as Lvov. Returning with many captives and much loot, Haji attacked him while crossing the Dnieper. He was surrounded and defeated, many of his soldiers went over to Haji and Sayid broke out with a few men. He went to Kiev and asked for Lithuanian help (sic). He was arrested and spent the rest of his life in Kovno.

In 1453, the Ottoman Turks captured Constantinople. Next year a Turkish fleet (56 ships under Demir-Khyakhi) approached Crimea to raid the Genoese ports. They landed at Kaffa in July but could not storm the fort. Three days later Haji Giray arrived with 6000 men and negotiated with the Turkish commander. We do not know what was said, but the next day the Turks withdrew, received supplies from the Genoese and headed out to sea.

In 1456, Haji defeated Mahmud bin Küchük as he was crossing the Don after a raid on Russia. Mahmud was replaced by his brother Ahmed Khan bin Küchük and fled to Astrakhan. Many of his men took service with Haji and were settled on Haji's lands, further increasing his strength.

It is said that in 1456, his son Hayder of Crimea briefly seized the throne, but this is not certain.

He moved his capital from Stary Krim to the rock-fort of Chufut-Kale. (Mengli I Geray moved it down to the valley at Salachik and Sahib I moved it to Bakhchisaray). He died in August 1466 and was buried in Salachik which is now on the outskirts of Bakhchysarai.

=== Aftermath ===
His important sons were: Mubarek, Hayder of Crimea (1456?), second son Nur Devlet (three reigns between 1466 and 1476), sixth son Meñli I Giray (three reigns 1468–1515). For more descendants see Mengli's son Mehmed I Giray.

After his death, in 1466–1478 Haji's sons Mengli and Nur Devlet fought for the throne. In 1475, the Turks captured the Genoese colonies on the south coast and in 1478 made Mengli I Giray (1478–1515) khan as a vassal and ally, an arrangement that lasted until 1774. In 1502 Mengli destroyed the remnant of the Golden Horde. Mengli's son Mehmed I Giray (1515–1523), tried to rejoin the three khanates but was killed. In 1523–1532 the khanate was contested by Mehmed's sons and brothers until Sahib I Giray (1532–1551) established a firm rule.

== See also ==
- Crimea#Geography for places mentioned
- History of Crimea
- List of Crimean Khans

== Sources ==
- The original sources are poor and contradictory, as are the sources in English. This is extracted from the Russian Wikipedia which appears to follow Gaivoronsky.
- Oleksa Gaivoronsky «Повелители двух материков», Kyiv-Bakhchysarai, 2007, ISBN 978-966-96917-1-2, pages 13–30
- Vernadsky, George (1953). The Mongols and Russia. New Haven: Yale University Press.

Preceded by -	Khan of Crimea; 1441–1466	Succeeded by Nur Devlet
