= Monument to Alexander Pushkin (Taganrog) =

Monument in Taganrog, Rostov, Russia

Coordinates: 47°07′29″N 38°33′45″E

- Памятник Александру Пушкину
- Interactive map of Monument to Alexander Pushkin
- Location: Taganrog, Rostov Oblast, Russia
- Material: bronze, granite
- Opening date: 1986
- Dedicated to: Alexander Pushkin

Monument to Alexander Pushkin in Taganrog (Russian: Памятник Александру Пушкину в Таганроге) is a monument dedicated to the prominent Russian poet. It was installed in 1986 at the Pushkin Embankment.

== History and description ==
The monument was erected in 1986 in order to commemorate the visit of Taganrog by Alexander Pushkin in June 1820, who was accompanied by General Nikolay Raevsky, who was his friend and a hero of the War of 1812. Pushkin stayed at the Governor Palace: there, five years later, died Russian Emperor Alexander I.

The Monument to Alexander Pushkin is made of bronze, and was designed by sculptor Georgy Neroda and by architect Pyotr Bondarenko. Originally the monument was installed facing the Pushkin Embankment, 10–15 meters north-west of the Stone Staircase on its axis.

In 2002, in connection with the reconstruction of the Pushkin Embankment and installation of the monument in the memory of the 300th Anniversary of Taganrog, the monument to Alexander Pushkin was moved 150 meters towards the Yacht Club building. When it was moved, the previous rectangular pedestal was also replaced by new, a round one.
