= İslâm I Giray =

Khan of Crimea for five months in 1532

Khan of the Tatar Crimean Khanate
- Reign: 1532
- Predecessor: Saadet I Girai
- Successor: Sahib I Giray
- Born: c. 1517; Bağçasaray, Crimean Khanate
- Died: 1537
- Dynasty: Giray dynasty
- Religion: Islam

İslâm I Giray (Note: Crimean Tatar, Ottoman Turkish and Persian: اسلام کرای.) (c. 1517–1537) was for five months 1532 Khan of the Crimean Khanate. He was preceded and followed his uncles Saadet I Girai (1524–1532) and Sahib I Giray (1532–1551). His father was Mehmed I Giray (1515–1523). Islam spent most of his life (1524–1537) trying to take the throne from his uncles. He was once Khan and twice Kalga or designated heir and co-ruler. He revolted three times, twice almost captured the khanship and once partitioned the Khanate between himself and his uncle. When not in Crimea he lived with the Nogai nomads.

== Life ==
In 1523 his over-ambitious father, Mehmed I Girai was killed by the Nogais at Astrakhan. The Nogais then invaded Crimea and withdrew with their loot. During the raid Islam was captured. The khanship passed to Mehmed's oldest surviving son Ğazı I Giray (1523–24), but the nobles and Turks soon replaced him with Mehmed's brother Saadet I Girai. Islam was released from captivity and in 1524 he and three other Gerais raided Lithuania. In October, while returning with their loot, they were defeated by a Cossack flotilla while crossing the Dnieper.

=== First revolt 1524–1526 ===
In 1524 Islam revolted against his uncle. Either before or after declaring himself, Saadat ordered him killed. Warned by friends he fled to the Nogais. Many Mirzas took his side. Near Perekop he captured Saadat's mother Mahmut-Sultan and her servants. He entered the Peninsula with a large army, took the capital of Kyrkor and declared himself khan. Saadet fled to the Turkish garrison at Perekop, which Islam besieged in November. Many Mirzas changed sides and in January 1525 Islam fled to the steppes. In the spring of 1525 he returned with a new army and drove Saadet from the capital. He also defeated a Turkish force from Kaffa. In autumn several great nobles changed sides and Islam fled to the steppes. In early 1526 he again appeared before Perekop. This time the factions compromised. Islam recognized Saadet as khan while he became Kalga. He was given Ochakov and the surrounding area.

In 1527, as kalga, he raided Russia but was blocked at the Oka River and was defeated near Zaraysk and on the Osyotr River.

=== Second revolt ===
In 1528 he revolted again and was defeated by Saadat with the support of Turkish troops. Many of his noble supporters were killed. In the spring of 1528 he arrived at Cherkassy seeking Lithuanian support.

He wandered with the Nogais and in 1531 occupied the throne of Astrakhan for a few months. (Note: This claim is from the Russian Wikipedia which seems to follow Gaivoronsky (2007). It hard to find in other sources, but the scholarship on Astrakhan is poor.) At the end of 1531 he appeared before Perekop and gained the support of some of the Shirins. In February 1532 he was driven back to Cherkassy and Kanev.

In the spring of 1532 he was wandering beyond the Don, while Saadet unsuccessfully besieged Cherkassy.

=== Khanship 1532 ===
In May 1532 Saadet renounced the throne and left for Istanbul. Islam came to Crimea and held the khanship for five months. The Turks made his uncle Sahib I Giray khan and Islam became Kalga, holding Perekop and Ochakov. In August 1533 the new Kalga led 40000 men against Russia but was driven back near Ryazan.

=== Third revolt 1534–1537 ===
In the summer of 1534 Islam revolted for a third time. He was defeated and sought refuge in Perekop. The effect was to partition the Khanate, with Islam controlling the steppes north of Perekop and Sahib holding the peninsula. Islam dealt with the Russians and Lithuanians and Sahib with the Turks. The struggle between the two Girais continued with varying success until 1537. Many Mirzas went over to Sahib, especially Baki-Beg. In 1537 Sahib captured Islam's camp near Perekop. Islam fled to the Nogais and was killed during a sudden attack by Baki-Beg. Hammar-Purgstall says that he was frozen to death in a barrel of water.

== Notes ==
| Preceded by Saadet I Girai | Khan of Crimea; 1532 | Succeeded by Sahib I Giray |
