= Ayşe Hatun (consort of Selim I) =

Consort of Ottoman Sultan Selim I

- Born: c. 1476; Bağçasaray, Crimean Khanate
- Died: c. 1539 (aged 62–63); Istanbul, Ottoman Empire (present day Istanbul, Turkey)
- Consort of: Şehzade Mehmed (m. 1504; died 1504) Selim I (m. 1511; died 1520)
- House: Giray (by birth); Osman (by marriage)
- Father: Meñli I Giray of Crimean Khanate
- Religion: Sunni Islam

Ayşe Hatun (Ottoman Turkish: عایشه خاتون, lit. 'life'; c.1476 – 1539) was a Crimean princess, daughter of Meñli I Giray. She was also a consort of the Ottoman Sultan Selim I.

== Biography ==
Ayşe Hatun was first married in 1504 to Selim's half-brother Şehzade Mehmed, Sanjakbey of Kefe, son of Ferahşad Hatun, and became a widow upon his death in the same year.

Her marriage was one of only two examples of marriages between the Ottoman dynasty and the Giray dynasty; the other one was those, alleged, between a Selim's daughter, maybe Gevherhan Sultan, to Saadet I Giray.

After her first husband's death, the Crimean princess entered in 1511 the harem of her husband's half-brother, the future Sultan Selim I (1512–1520), when he was the governor of Amasya, thus securing for him, in the person of her powerful father, a valuable ally in the prince's struggle for the throne.

== See also ==
- List of consorts of the Ottoman Sultans
