= Ğazı I Giray =

Khan of Crimea (1523–4)

Khan of the Tatar Crimean Khanate
- Reign: 1523–1524
- Predecessor: Mehmed I Giray
- Successor: Saadet I Giray
- Born: 1504
- Died: April 1524 (aged 19–20); Feodosia
- Dynasty: Giray dynasty
- Religion: Islam

Ğazı I Giray (Note: Crimean Tatar, Ottoman Turkish and Persian: غازی کرای) (1504 – April 1524) was khan of the Crimean khanate for 6 months between 1523 and 1524. He was preceded by his father Mehmed I Giray (r. 1515–1523) and was followed by his uncle Saadet I Girai (r. 1524–1532). He was enthroned after his father's murder and was executed by his uncle. In the nine years following Mehmed's death the throne was contested Mehmed's sons Gazi and Islam and his brothers Saadet and Sahib until Mehmed's brother Sahib I Giray (1532–1551) achieved a long reign.

In 1523, his father Mehmed took over the Khanate of Astrakhan and placed Gazy's brother Bakhadyr on the throne. Mehmed's Nogai allies, fearing his growing power, killed him and Bakhadyr. Gazy and his brother Baba fled back to Crimea with a few men. They were followed by a large Nogai army which looted much of Crimea except for the mountains and fortified cities. The Crimean nobles gathered 12,000 men and attacked the Nogais. They were defeated and withdrew to Perekop which then had a Turkish garrison. At the same time Cossacks under Kanev starost Evstafy Dashkevich raided and destroyed the fortress of Ochakov. The Nogais then returned to the steppe with their loot.

Since Gazy was the eldest surviving son of Mehmed, he was chosen khan (fall 1523). He chose his brother Baba as Kalga. He quickly lost the support of the great nobles. Led by Memish Bey of the Shirin clan, they appealed to the Turks. The Shirin Bey personally went to Istanbul and asked that Saadet be brought back to Crimea. In the spring of 1524, Saadet landed with Turkish troops and took the throne.

There are different stories of Gazi's death. According to Gaivoronsky, Saadet murdered him on their first meeting and imprisoned his brothers Baba and Choban. Halim-Giray-Sultan says that Saadet made Gazi kalga and killed him and Baba three months later. Howorth, writing in 1880, says that the Shirins tried to prevent a civil war by making Saadat Khan and Gazi Kalga. When Gazi was about to take the oath of allegiance he was murdered.

== Sources ==
- Henry Hoyle Howorth, History of the Mongols, 1880, part 2, page 477
- Oleksa Gaivoronsky, «Повелители двух материков», Kiev-Bakhchisarai, 2007, ISBN 978-966-96917-1-2, pages 153-157
