= Hayder of Crimea =

Hayder Giray

Khan of Crimea
- 1st reign: 1456
- Predecessor: Hacı I Giray
- Successor: Hacı I Giray
- 2nd reign: 1475
- Predecessor: Meñli I Giray
- Successor: Nur Devlet
- Born: Unknown
- Died: 1487; Muscovy
- Dynasty: Giray
- Father: Hacı I Giray
- Religion: Islam

Hayder Khan Giray (Note: Crimean Tatar, Ottoman Turkish and Persian: حیدر خان کرای) (?–1487, reigned 1456?, 1475) was either once or twice briefly a Khan of Crimea.

== Life ==
He was one of the sons of the dynasty's founder Hacı I Giray (c. 1441–1466). It is reported that in 1456 he rebelled against his father and briefly occupied the throne, but this is not certain.

After his father's death, for twelve years (1466–1478), the throne alternated between Hayder's brothers Nur Devlet and Meñli I Giray. During one of Mengli's reigns Hayder was held in honorable confinement at the Genoese fortress of Sudak.

In March 1475 the nobles replaced Mengli with Hayder. He and the Shirin Bey Eminek raided the Lithuanian border. In May–December 1475 the Turks captured the Genoese ports on the south shore. They released Nur Devlet from prison in Sudak and made him khan. Hayder yielded to Nur Devlet but their relations were not good. Nur Devlet proved unpopular and in the spring of 1478 the Turks released their prisoner Mengli and placed him on the throne.

Hayder and Nur Devlet fled to Kiev in the Polish Kingdom. About 1479 they moved to Muscovy under protection of the grand duke Ivan III, who later banished Hayder to Northern Muscovy for reasons that remain unknown. He died about 1487 in Beloozero, Vologda oblast.

== See also ==
- Crimean Khanate
- History of Crimea
- List of Crimean khans

== Notes ==
Preceded by Hacı I Giray	Khan of Crimea; 1456	Succeeded by Hacı I Giray
Preceded by Meñli I Giray	Khan of Crimea; 1475	Succeeded by Nur Devlet
