= Nur Devlet =

Khan of the Crimean Khanate (1466–1467, 1467–1469 and 1475–1476)

Khan of Crimea
- 1st reign: 1466–1467
- Predecessor: Hacı I Giray
- Successor: Meñli I Giray
- 2nd reign: 1467–1469
- Predecessor: Meñli I Giray
- Successor: Meñli I Giray
- 3rd reign: 1475–1478
- Predecessor: Hayder Giray
- Successor: Meñli I Giray

Khan of Qasim
- Reign: 1486–1491
- Predecessor: Daniyal ibn Qasim
- Successor: Satylghan ibn Nur Daulat
- Died: 1503; Kasimov
- Burial: Mausoleum of Haji Giray, Bakhchisaray
- Issue: Berdaulat Girey; Khan Satilgan Giray; Khan Janay Giray
- Dynasty: Giray dynasty
- Father: Hacı I Giray
- Religion: Islam

Nur Devlet Giray (Note: Crimean Tatar, Ottoman Turkish and Persian: نور دولت کرای) (died 1503) was the khan of the Crimean Khanate from 1466 to 1467, 1467 to 1469, and 1475 to 1476.

== Life ==
He was the eldest son of Hacı I Giray, the founder of Crimean Khanate. In 1466, Hacı I Giray died and Nur Devlet succeeded him as the Khan of Crimea, but he was expelled by his brother Menli. In 1475, the Ottomans invaded and put Nur on the throne. In 1478, the Turks replaced him with Mengli. Nur then entered Russian service. The Qasim Khanate was a Russian vassal, and in 1486, its ruling house died out and Nur Devlet was made Khan of Qasim. In 1490, he gave the throne to his son, and in 1503, died after a long illness.

== Khan of Crimea ==
=== First and second reigns ===
In August 1466, the first Khan of Crimea, Hacı I Giray died and the Crimean beys elected Nur Devlet to succeed him. His younger brother Meñli I Giray revolted. Mengli was generally supported by the Crimean nobility, while Nur Devlet was supported by the Great Horde State. Mengli became khan in 1467, but was quickly driven out and fled to the Genoese in Kaffa. In June 1468, a delegation of beys went to Kaffa and elected Mengli as the khan. The delegation and a Genoese detachment marched on the old capital of Chufut-Kale, and in early 1469, and Nur Devlet was driven out. He fled to the North Caucasus, where he was pursued, captured and then imprisoned at the Genoese fortress of Sudak.

=== Third reign ===
Following the Ottoman invasion of Crimea in 1475, Mengli was captured and imprisoned in Istanbul. The Turks were more interested in expelling the Genoese than ruling Crimea. Nur Devlet was released and became khan as a vassal and tributary of the Turks.

Eminek was a powerful bey of the Shirin clan in eastern Crimea by the Kerch Peninsula. In 1476, his brother Hadzhike rebelled and fled to Akhmed Khan of the Great Horde. Akhmed sent an army under Janibeg (son of his brother Mahmud bin Küchük), which was driven out by Emenik. In the fall of 1476, the Sultan ordered Eminek to lead 10,000 men against Moldavia, where he was defeated. While he was away, Janibeg invaded Crimea and made himself khan. In 1477, Nur Devlet expelled Janibeg and regained the throne. Eminek was displeased and wrote to the sultan asking that Mengli be restored. In the spring of 1478, Mengli was released and returned with Turkish soldiers. He and Eminek drove out Nur Devlet, who fled to Polish–Lithuanian Commonwealth. The Poles sent him to Kiev.

== Russian exile ==
Nur Devlet and his brother Hayder fled to Poland, and in 1479, he entered Russian service. In 1480, at the time of the Great Stand on the Ugra River, he and Vasily Nozdrovaty were sent to attack Akhmed's capital of Sarai as a diversion. His son Ber Devlet was killed by a Tatar and he avenged his son's death.

In the north, the Qasim Khanate was a Muslim vassal state of the Russians. In 1486, its ruler died without sons. Nur Devlet was a Muslim and a descendant of Genghis, which gave him a right to be a khan. The Russians made him the khan of Qasim. He may have held Kashira at some point. In the first year of his reign, the steppe warlord Murtaza sought to overthrow Mengli with the help of Nur Devlet and Ivan III. Ivan warned Mengli. Nur Devlet was sent to guard the southern frontier. During 1478–1490, he campaigned against the sons of Akhmed bin Kuchuk. Towards the end of 1490, he gave the throne to his son Satylgan. In 1503, he died after a long illness. At the request of Satylgan and Mengli, his remains were sent to Crimea, where he is buried.

== Sources ==
- Alan W. Fisher, The Crimean Tatars, Hoover Institution Press, Stanford California, 1987 ISBN 0-81-796662-5, p. 9–11.
- Joseph von Hammer-Purgstall, Histoire de l'Empire ottoman, «Tome deuxième 1453-1494», Bellizard, Barthès, Dufour, Lowell, Paris, 1886.

Preceded by Hacı I Giray	Khan of Crimea; 1466–1467	Succeeded by Meñli I Giray
Preceded by Meñli I Giray	Khan of Crimea; 1467–1469	Succeeded by Meñli I Giray
Preceded by Hayder	Khan of Crimea; 1475–1478	Succeeded by Meñli I Giray
