= Voskresenka (Kyiv) =

Neighborhood of Kyiv, Ukraine

Coordinates: 50°28′13″N 30°35′41″E

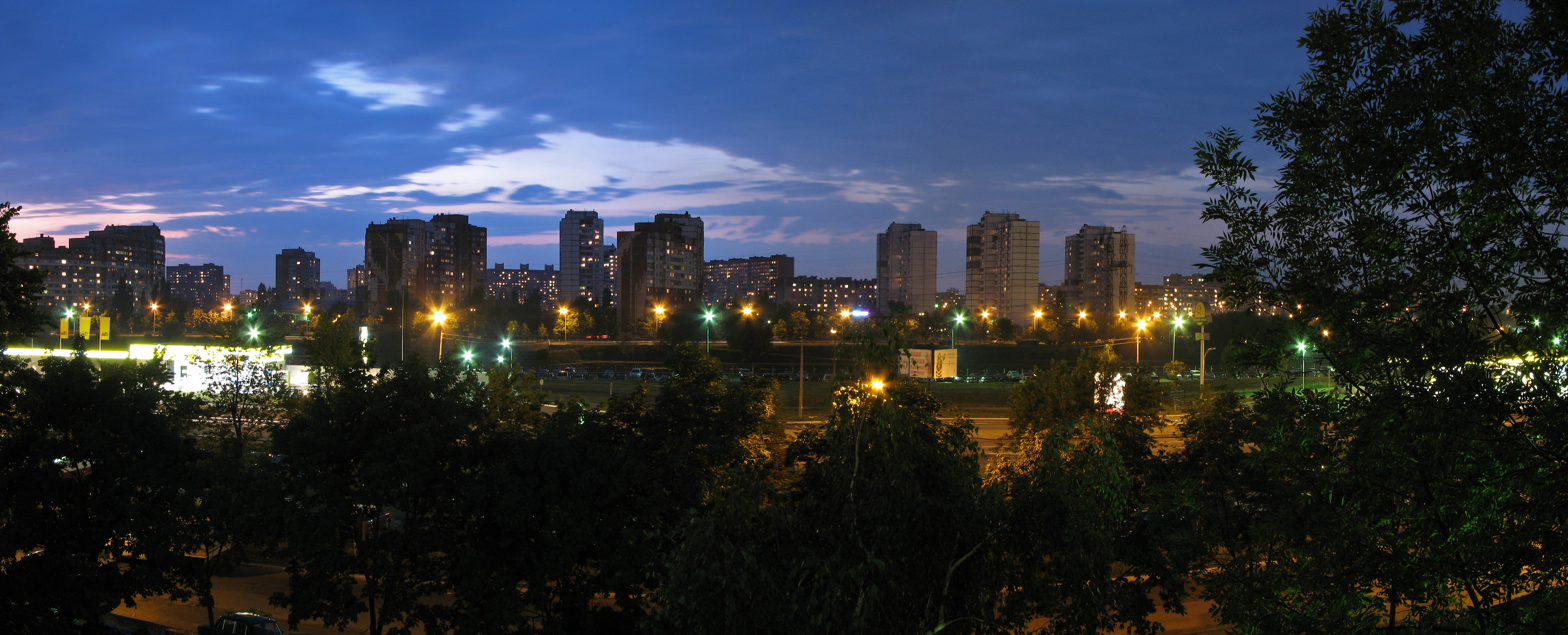
Skyline of Voskresenka

Voskresenka (Ukrainian: Воскресенка), also known by the name Voskresenka Masyv (Ukrainian: Воскресенський масив, romanized: Voskresenskyi masyv) is a neighborhood of Kyiv, the capital of Ukraine. It is a historical region on the left bank of the Dnieper.

== History ==
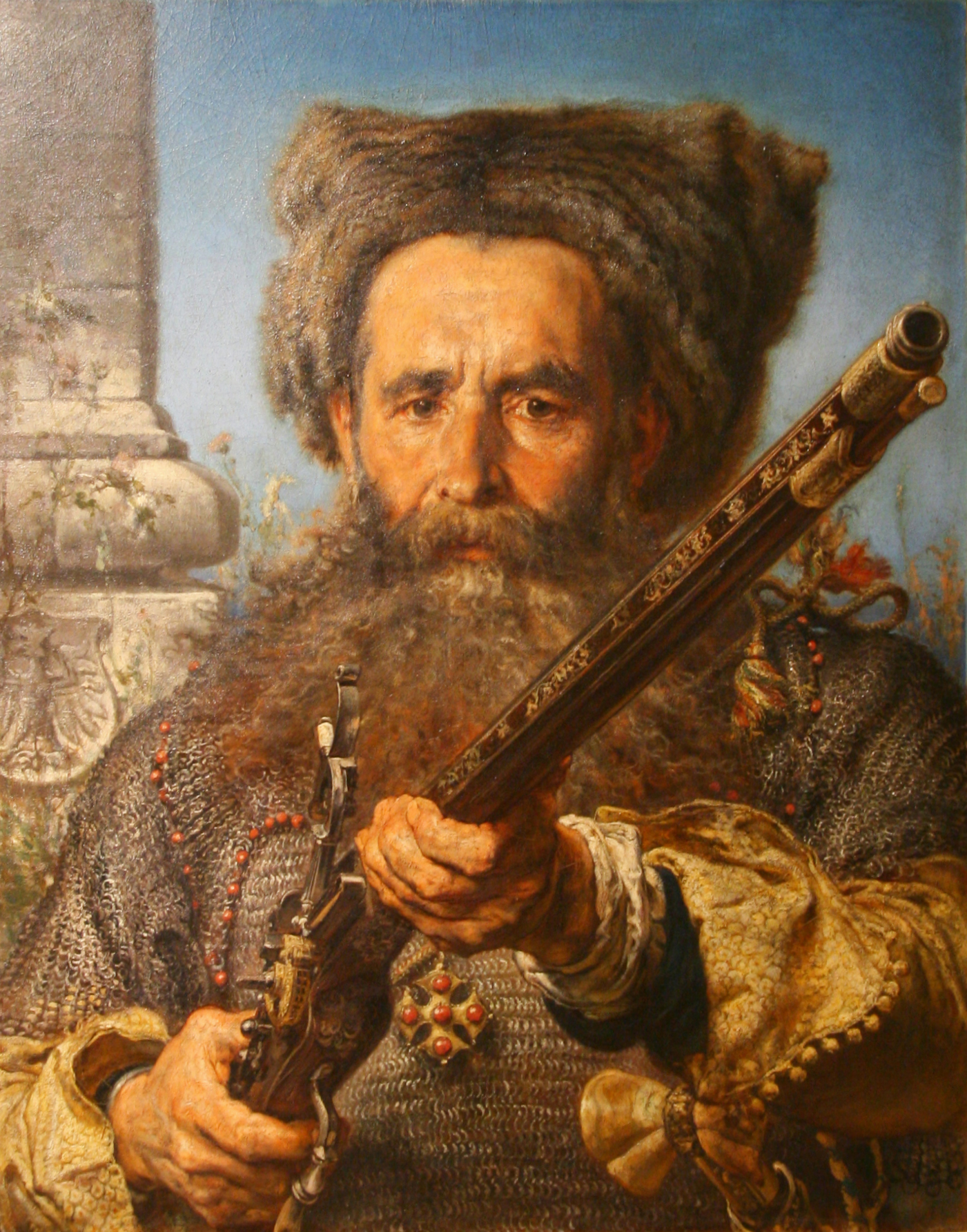
Cossack otaman Ostap Dashkevych

Voskresenka emerged on the base of former village Voskresenska Slobidka of Oster Povit of Chernigov Governorate of the Russian empire.

One of the earliest owners of this land was the prince and otaman of the Cossacks of Ukrainian Rus Ostap Dashkevych of Orthodox Christian faith, descendant of Prince Rurik and Genghis, one of the founders of the Army of Ukrainian Cossacks, defenders of lives and liberties of Ukrainian people of that time. He donated this lands to the Voskresenska Church (Church of Resurrection of Christ) at Podil in Kyiv from which the village got its name.
