= Meñli I Giray =

Khan of Crimea 1466, 1469–1475, 1478–1515

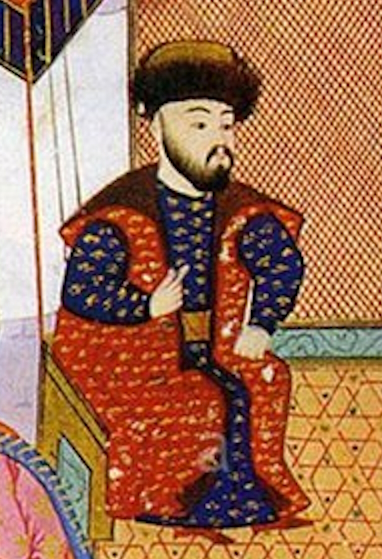
- Turkish miniature of Meñli I Giray, 16th century Hünername

Khan of Crimea
- 1st reign: 1467
- Predecessor: Nur Devlet
- Successor: Nur Devlet
- 2nd reign: 1469–1475
- Predecessor: Nur Devlet
- Successor: Hayder Giray
- 3rd reign: 1478–1515
- Predecessor: Nur Devlet
- Successor: Mehmed I Giray
- Born: 1445
- Died: 17 April 1515 (aged 69–70)
- Burial: Bakhchisaray
- Spouse: Nur Sultan; Zayan Sultan; Fülane Sultan
- Issue more...: Mehmed I Giray; Saadet I Giray; Sahib I Giray; Ayşe Hatun
- Dynasty: Giray dynasty
- Father: Hacı I Giray
- Religion: Islam

Meñli I Giray (Note: Crimean Tatar, Ottoman Turkish and Persian: منکلی کرای) (1445–1515) was thrice the khan of the Crimean Khanate (1466, 1469–1475, 1478–1515) and the sixth son of Hacı I Giray.

== Biography ==
Crimea at the time of Meñli Giray

=== Struggle for power (1466–1478) ===
It took Meñli 12 years to establish himself as khan. When Haji Giray died, power went to his eldest son Nur Devlet. Meñli revolted. He was supported by the Crimean nobility while Nur Devlet was supported by the Great Horde. In 1467 Meñli occupied the capital of Kyrk-Er (Chufut-Kale) but was soon driven out by Nur Devlet and fled to the Genoese at Kaffa. In June 1468 a delegation of nobles elected him khan at Kaffa. He, the nobles and a Genoese detachment marched on the capital. After six months, Nur Devlet was expelled and fled to the North Caucasus, but was captured and imprisoned in the Genoese fortress at Sudak.

=== Second reign 1469–1475 ===
He made an anti-Turkish alliance with Principality of Theodoro. In the summer of 1469 a Turkish fleet burned some villages near Kaffa. From late 1473 Eminek made himself head of the Shirin clan which held the eastern peninsula of Crimea. He became the second most powerful man in the country and was often hostile to Meñli.

In March 1475 the nobles replaced Meñli with his elder brother Hayder of Crimea. Meñli fled to Kaffa. In May 1475 a large Turkish fleet arrived at Kaffa seeking to subordinate the Genoese. They took Kaffa and other Genoese forts and the Principality of Theodoro. Meñli, who had supported the Genoese, was captured and taken to Constantinople. Nur Devlet was released from prison and restored as a Turkish vassal. Nur Devlet's third reign (1475–78) was unsuccessful. In the winter of 1477–78 Crimea was briefly conquered by Janibeg, a nephew of Ahmed Khan of the Great Horde. Eminek wrote to the sultan asking that Meñli be restored. In the spring of 1478 Meñli was released and arrived at Crimea with a Turkish fleet and Turkish soldiers. He was joined by Eminek's troops, Nur Devlet was driven out and Meñli became khan as a Turkish vassal.

=== Third reign (1478–1515) ===
He made a great contribution to the development of Crimean Tatar statehood. He founded the fortress of Özü.

In 1480, Meñli entered into a treaty of alliance with Ivan III, the grand prince of Moscow. The alliance was directed against Poland-Lithuania, the Great Horde and the Khanate of Astrakhan. This was an important factor in the Great stand on the Ugra River which led to Russian independence from the Great Horde.

In September 1482, Meñli managed to ravage Kiev, in which Ivan Chodkiewicz and his family were taken hostage. From 1489 to 1500, Crimean Tatars repeatedly devastated Podolia and Volyn.

In 1502, Meñli defeated the last khan of the Golden Horde and took control over its capital, Saray. He proclaimed himself Khagan (Emperor), claiming legitimacy as the successor of the Golden Horde's authority over the Tatar khaganates in the Caspian-Volga region.

Meñli was buried in the Dürbe (or türbe) of Salaçıq in Bakhchysarai. In that city, he commissioned Zıncırlı Medrese (medrese with chains) in Salaçıq (1500), Dürbe in Salaçıq (1501), and "Demir Qapı" (Iron Gate) portal in the Bakhchisaray Palace by Aloisio the New (1503).

Meñli often depended on troops from the Crimea's numerous Italian trading cities, and Genoese mercenaries formed a significant part of his army.

For his raids on Lithuania see Crimean-Nogai raids for 1480–1511.

== Family ==
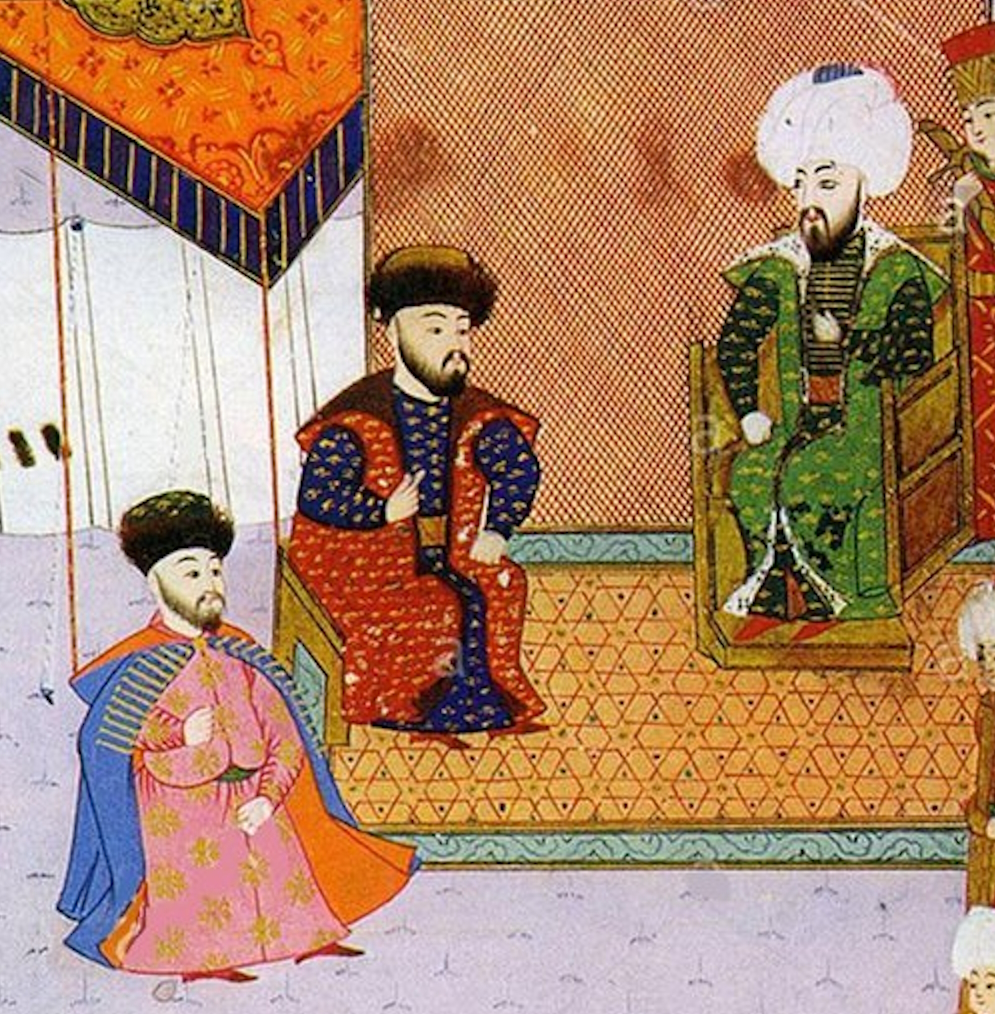
Meñli I Giray (centre) with the eldest son, future khan Mehmed I Giray (left) and Ottoman sultan Bayezid II (right). Hünername

Meñli was a father of Mehmed I Giray and Sahib I Giray. One of his wives was Nur Sultan, who was one of only three women known to have played a political role in the Crimean Khanate.

=== Consorts ===
Meñli's known consorts were:

- Nur Sultan, daughter of Prince Timur ibn Mansur, bey of the Manghits;
- Zayan Sultan, probably a daughter of Giray Seyid, a Sayyid;
- Fülane Sultan, a daughter of Yadigar, bey of Sedjiuts;

=== Sons ===
Meñli's sons were:

- Fetih Giray, married to Djalal Sultana, daughter of Musake ibn Hadjike, bey of Manghits;
- Mehmed I Giray, married to a daughter of Hasan ibn Timur of Manghits;
- Saadet I Giray, probably married to a daughter of Shaman of Manghits in 1526;
- Sahib I Giray, married to Fatima Sultan and Khanbike Sultan, sister of the Circassian Prince Mashuk Kanukov.
- Mubarek Giray also spelled Mubarak. His son was Devlet I Giray (1551–1577).
- Ahmed Giray, married to a daughter of Barash, brother of Devletek, head of Shirin clan

=== Daughters ===
Meñli's daughters were:

- A daughter, married to Tinish bin Yankuvat of Manghits;
- Makhdum Shah, married to head of Shirin clan, Devletek bin Eminek;
- A daughter, married to Suleyman, bey of Kungrats in 1492 or 1493;
- Nazlikhan Hatun, allegedly married to Idar of Kabardia, great-grandson of Inal the Great.
- Ayşe Hatun, married firstly Şehzade Mehmed, son of Sultan Bayezid II, and after his half-brother Sultan Selim I.

Meñli I Giray was once thought to be the maternal grandfather of Suleiman the Magnificent through his putative daughter Hafsa Sultan (mistakenly confused with Ayşe Hatun), but this has been disproved.

== Notes ==
Preceded by Nur Devlet	Khan of Crimea; 1467	Succeeded by Nur Devlet
Preceded by Nur Devlet	Khan of Crimea; 1469–1475	Succeeded by Nur Devlet
Preceded by Nur Devlet	Khan of Crimea; 1478–1515	Succeeded by Mehmed I Giray
