= Satylghan ibn Nur Daulat =

Khan of Qasim from 1491 to 1506

Sultan of the Tatar Qasim Khanate
- Reign: 1491–1506
- Predecessor: Nur Daulat ibn Haji Girai
- Successor: Janai ibn Nur Daulat
- Born: unknown
- Died: 1506
- Dynasty: Giray
- Religion: Islam

Satylghan ibn Nur Daulat (Note: Crimean Tatar, Ottoman Turkish and Persian: ستیلغن کرای) was the fourth ruler of the Qasim Khanate. he was preceded by his father Nur Daulat ibn Haji Girai and followed by his younger brother Janai. He was the second Qasim ruler of the Giray dynasty which came from Crimea and was the first to have the title of Sultan (سلطان). He fought the Great Horde in 1491 and Kazan in 1505. In 1501–1503 he was imprisoned in Russia.

== Notes ==
Satylghan ibn Nur Daulat Giray
Preceded by Nur Daulat ibn Haji Girai	Sultan of Qasim; 1491–1506	Succeeded by Janai ibn Nur Daulat
