= Ferahşad Hatun =

Concubine of Ottoman Sultan Bayezid II

- Died: 1530; Bursa, Ottoman Empire (present day Bursa, Turkey)
- Burial: Muradiye Complex, Bursa
- Spouse: Bayezid II
- Issue: Şehzade Mehmed
- Religion: Sunni Islam

Ferahşad Hatun (Ottoman Turkish: فرخشاد خاتون; also known as Muhtereme Hatun (Ottoman Turkish: محترمہ خاتون, "Honorable, respectful"), was a concubine of Sultan Bayezid II of the Ottoman Empire.

== Life ==
Ferahşad entered Bayezid's harem in 1484, and gave birth to Şehzade Mehmed, the last of Bayezid's sons, in 1486. Contemporary historian Kemalpaşazade commented on his birth, by stating that he was a "substitute" (bedel) for his recently deceased half-brother, Şehzade Abdullah (died in 1483, son of Şirin Hatun).

According to Turkish tradition, all princes were expected to work as provincial governors as a part of their training. Mehmed was sent to Kefe in 1490, and Ferahşad accompanied him.

Following Mehmed's death in December 1504, she retired to Bursa. In retirement she made endowments in Silivri, and Istanbul. She was buried in Muradiye Complex, Bursa.

== Issue ==
Together with Bayezid, Ferahşad had one son:

- Şehzade Mehmed (1484 - December 1504, buried in Muradiye Complex). In 1504 he married a princess of the Giray khanate of Crimea, Ayşe Hatun (who would later be consort of his half-brother Selim I) and had three children by an unknown mother, Fatma Sultan (1500 - 1566), Şehzade Alemşah and Şehzade Mehmed (1505, posthumously - 1513, killed by Selim I).
