= Depaldo Stairs =

Depaldo Stone Steps
- Public stairs
- Russian: Депальдовская лестница, also Старая каменная лестница
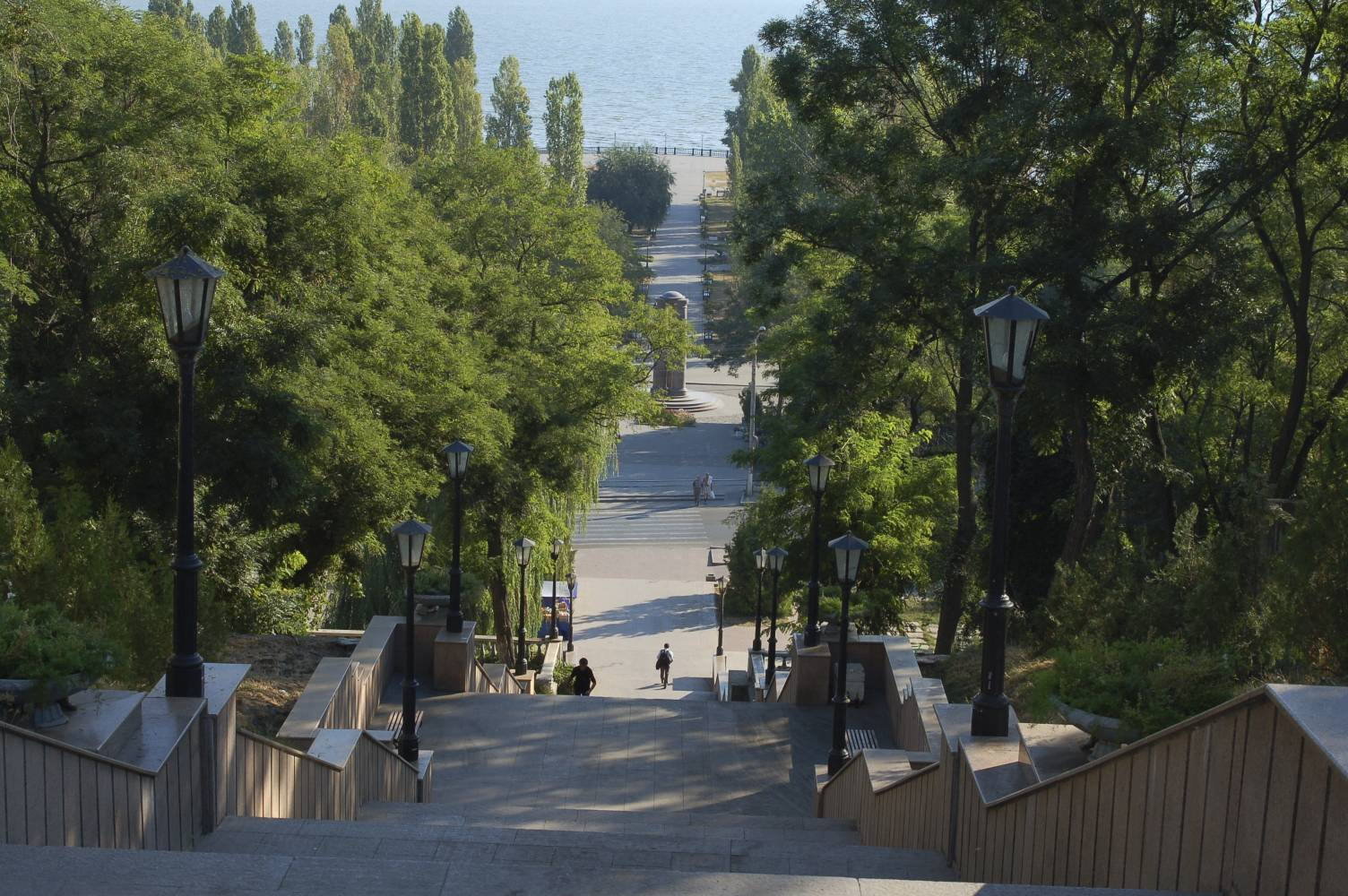
- View from Grecheskaya Street towards the Gulf of Taganrog and the Pushkin Embankment
- Design: Francesco Boffo
- Opened: 1823
- Steps: 110
- Surface: stone
- Dedicated to: Gerasim Depaldo
- Location: Turgenevskaya Street; Taganrog, Rostov Oblast, Russia
- Interactive map of Depaldo Stone Steps
- Coordinates: 47°12′47″N 38°56′17″E

The Depaldo Stone Steps (Russian: Депальдовская лестница, also Старая каменная лестница) in Taganrog in Russia were constructed in 1823. They were the project of the swiss architect Francesco Boffo, with the funding of Taganrog's Greek merchant Gerasim Depaldo, at the crossroads of Greek Street (near Tchaikovsky House in Taganrog) and Depaldo Street (now Turgenevskaya Street) in Taganrog. The stairway begins up on the hill in downtown and goes down ending near the Sea of Azov foreshore (Pushkin Embankment).

During the World War II, the Old Stone Steps were heavily damaged. In the 1970s they were reconstructed, but not finished. The new reconstruction was made in 2005. During the latest reconstruction all the old stone steps were replaced by new stones.

== Views of Depaldo stone stairs ==
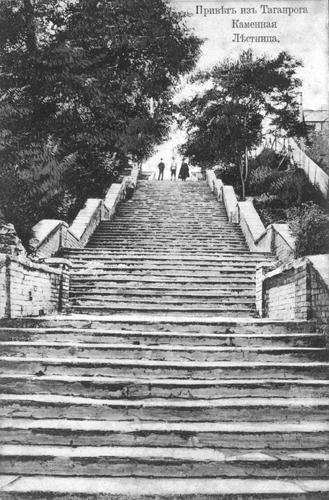
Depaldo stone stairs in Taganrog (photo early 1900s).

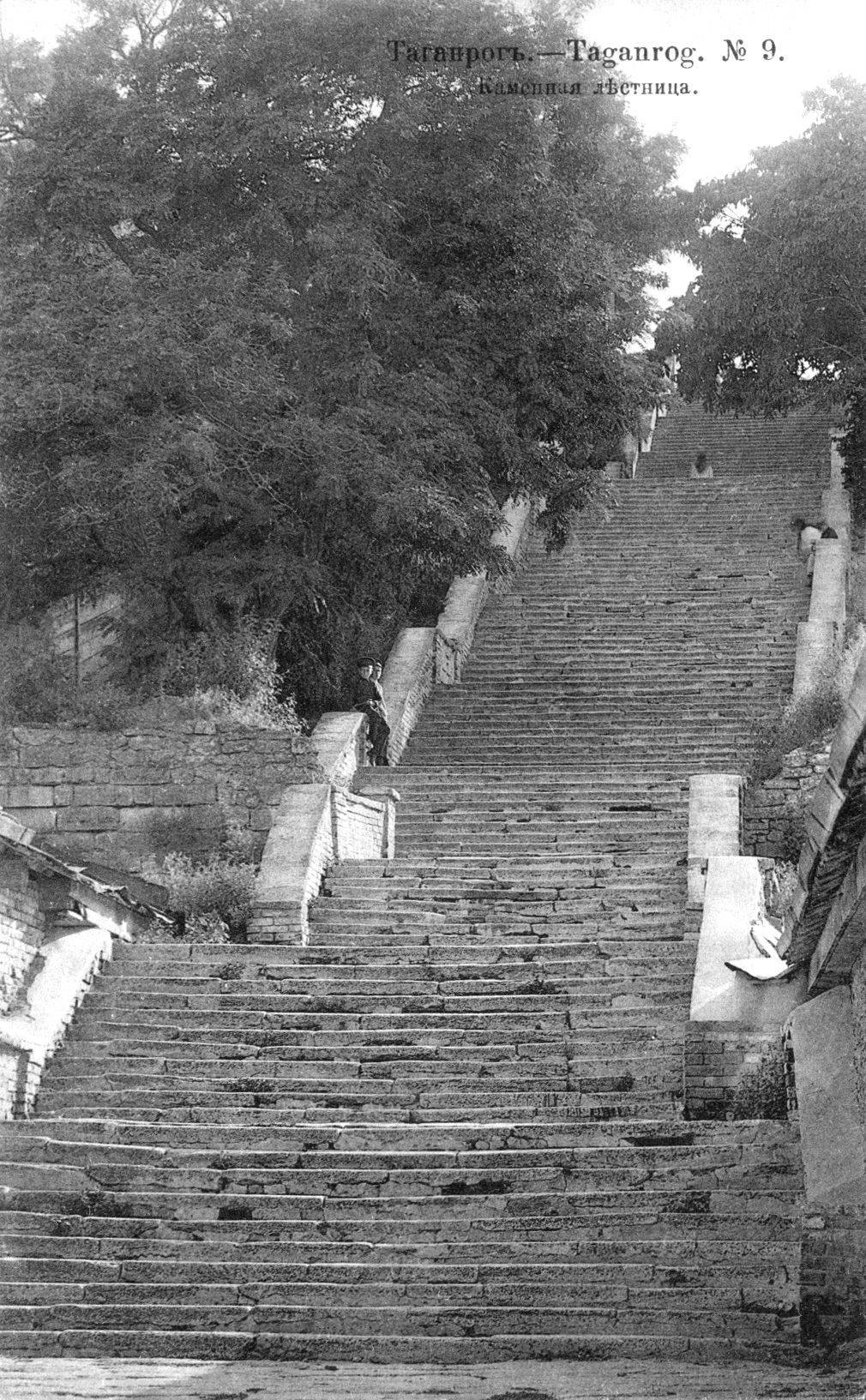
Depaldo stone stairs in Taganrog (photo early 1900s).

Greek Street in Taganrog with entrance to Depaldo stone stairs (on right side) and pedestal for sun-dial (a stone cube in centre) (photo early 1900s).

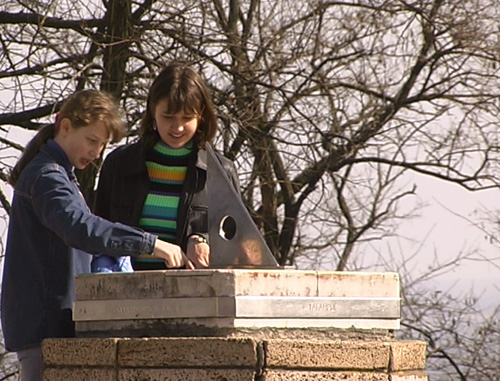
Gnomon of Sundial near entrance to Depaldo stone stairs in Taganrog (photo 2002).

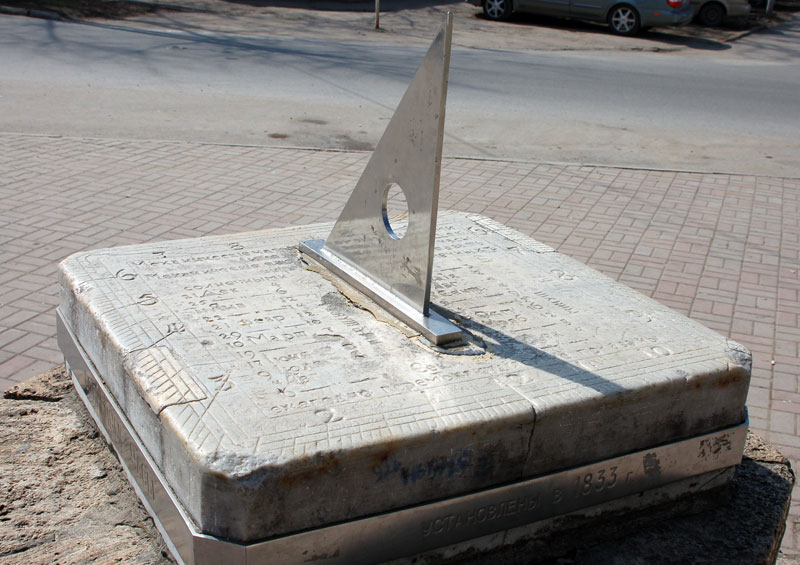
Sundial near Old Stone Steps, photo of 2006.

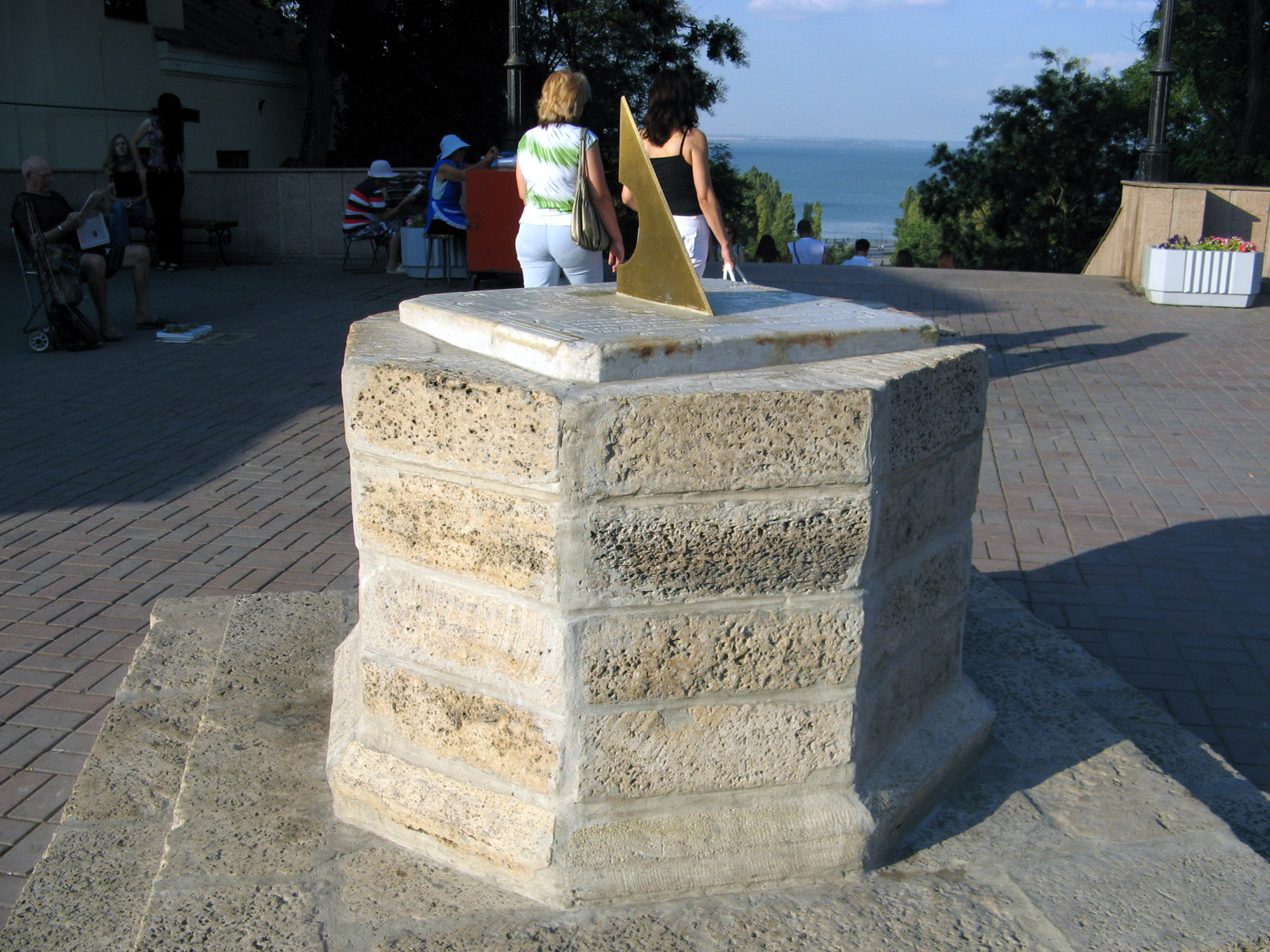
Sundial near Old Stone Steps, photo from 2007

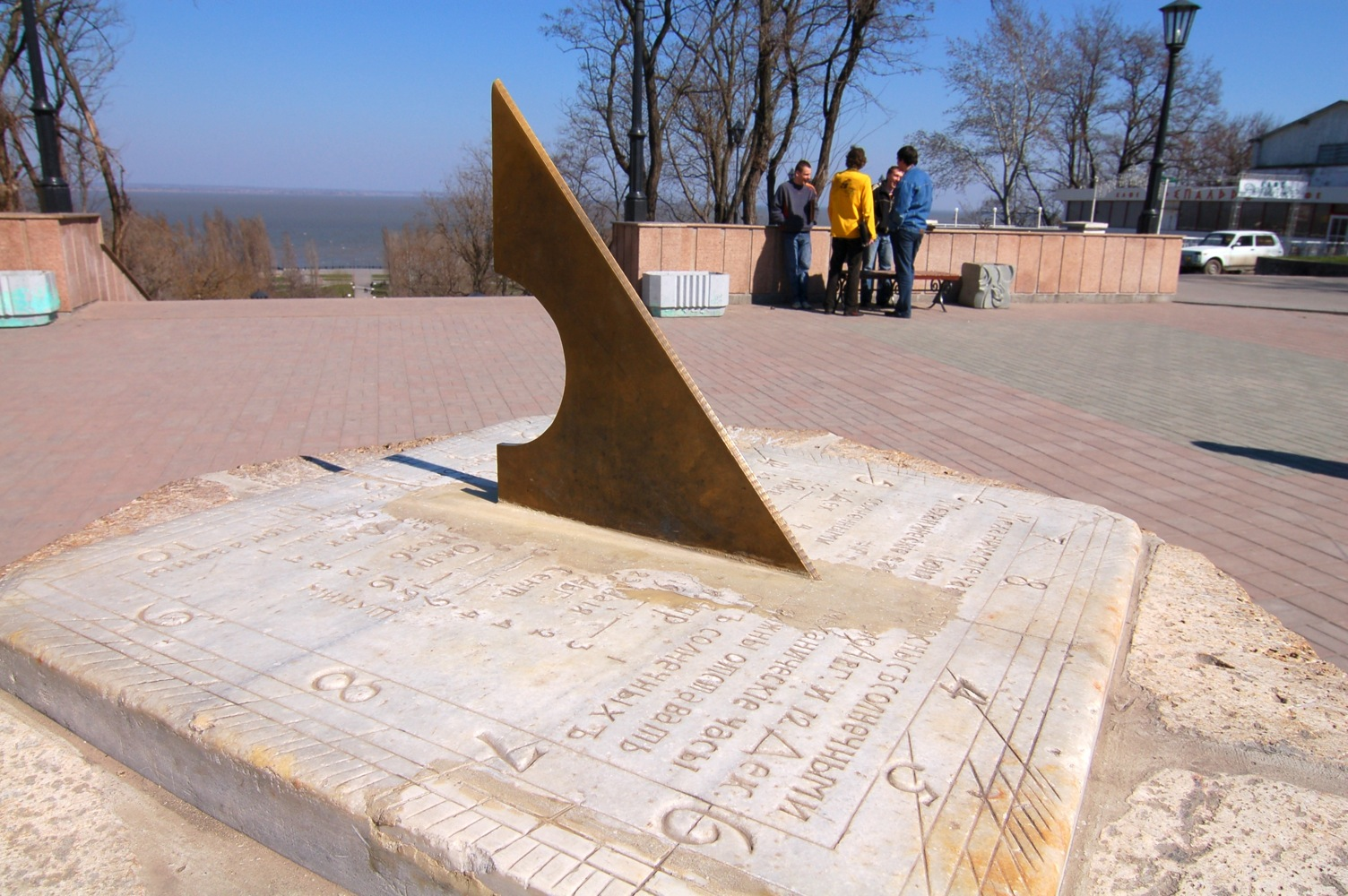
Sundial near Old Stone Steps, photo from 2008
