= Saadet I Giray =

Khan of Crimea (r. 1524–32)

Khan of the Tatar Crimean Khanate
- Reign: 1524–1532
- Predecessor: Ğazı I Giray
- Successor: İslâm I Giray
- Born: 1492
- Died: 1538 (aged 45–46); Istanbul
- Spouse: Gevherhan Sultan (disputed)
- Issue: Ahmed Pasha
- Dynasty: Giray dynasty
- Father: Meñli I Giray
- Religion: Islam

Saadet I Giray (Note: Crimean Tatar, Ottoman Turkish and Persian: سعادت کرای.) (1492–1538) was Khan of the Crimean Khanate (reigned 1524–1532). He was pro-Ottoman and a competent ruler. He followed Ğazı I Giray (1523–24) and was followed by İslâm I Giray (1532).

== Service in Turkey (1512–1524) ==
He was one of the eight sons of Crimean Khan Mengli Giray (reigned 1478–1515). Ottoman Sultan Bayezid II (r. 1481–1512), late in his reign, faced rebellions of his two sons, Şehzade Ahmed and Şehzade Selim. One of Selim's consort was Ayşe Hatun, a daughter of Mengli Giray. In 1511 or 1512 Mengli sent troops under his son Saadet to aid his son-in-law. Selim won and replaced his father. Saadet suppressed revolts in Anatolia, and maybe married Gevherhan Sultan, a daughter of Selim and was an ally of both Selim I the Grim (r. 1512–1520) and his son Suleiman the Magnificent (r. 1520–1566). He had a son, maybe by Gevherhan, Ahmed Pasha.

== Khan 1524–1532 ==
When Saadet's brother Mehmed I was killed at Astrakhan he was followed by his son Ğazı I Giray (r. 1523–24). Gazy was unpopular with the Crimean nobles who sent to Istanbul to bring in Saadet. In April 1524 Saadet landed with Turkish troops, took the throne and killed Gazy. Saadet's nephew Gazy had reigned about six months.

His initial policy was one of peace and consolidation. He found Crimea much weakened by the Nogai invasion. He sought to restore order, copied Turkish institutions, surrounded himself with Turkish officials, reorganized the army and for the first time introduced artillery. The nobles were not happy with his pro-Turkish policies. To get the support of the Shirin clan he married Shirin-Bek, the widow of his older brother Akhmed who had rebelled against Mehmed in 1519. He established peaceful relations with Astrakhan, tried to establish relations with the various Nogai Mirzas and unsuccessfully tried to mediate peace between Moscow and Kazan.

Much of his reign was spent fighting his nephew, Mehmed's son Islam Giray, who constantly tried to take the Crimean throne. For this complex story see İslâm I Giray.

He continued the traditional slave raids northward. In June 1524 he sent four Giray princes, Islam, Usbek, Buchek and Yantur to invade Lithuania. On the way back they were defeated by Cossacks while crossing the Dnieper. In late 1526 he led 30,000 men against Lithuania and took many captives and much booty. On the way back, on 27 January, they were completely defeated on the Olshanitsa River near Kiev by Lithuanians under Konstanty Ostrogski. In autumn 1527 Kalga Islam Giray led 40000 men against Russia, but they were blocked at the Oka River. The Russians chased them to the Don River and defeated several isolated groups. In the spring of 1532 Saadet and Turkish Janissaries unsuccessfully besieged Cherkassy for one month.

The Shirins were a large noble clan who held the Kerch Peninsula. In the autumn of 1531 they invited Saadet to their capital at Stary Krym planning to kill him. The conspiracy was led by Shirin Mirza Bakhtiyar-Beg and included Saadet's wife Shirin-Bek and his nephews Buchek and Yusuf Girai. Warned by two of the Shirins, Saadet arrived with Turkish janissaries and Sipahis armed with guns. He captured Stary Krym and the surrounding uluses, executed Bakhtiyar, Buchak, Yusuf and their sons and relatives, imprisoned Shirin-Bek and appointed a new Shirin ruler. Some of the surviving Shirins fled to Islam Gerai during his second revolt.

== Return to Turkey ==
For reasons not given, in May 1532 Saadet voluntarily renounced the throne and went to Istanbul where he received a large pension. He accompanied Sultan Suleiman on a campaign against Safavid Iran. He died in 1538 at the age of 46 and was buried in Istanbul.

== Notes ==
Preceded by Ğazı I Giray	Khan of Crimea; 1524–1532	Succeeded by İslâm I Giray
