= Pushkin Embankment in Taganrog =

The Pushkin Embankment or Pushkin Quay (Russian: Пушкинская набережная) is a street along the Gulf of Taganrog in downtown Taganrog, a seaport city in Rostov Oblast, Russia.

== History ==
The Embankment on the seashore of Gulf of Taganrog was laid out in 1838-1849, and was referred to as Vorontsov Embankment (Russian: Воронцовская набережная). In 1873, a railroad branch line stretched towards the Taganrog seaport alongside the quay.

In 1949, the embankment underwent a capital reconstruction and was named after Russian poet Alexander Pushkin. In June 1986, a monument to Alexander Pushkin was inaugurated. The embankment was reconstructed and re-planned for Taganrog's tercentenary anniversary celebrations in 1998. The latest reconstruction was finished in 2005-2006, and today it spans between the Taganrog Yacht Club and the New Pushkin Quay in front of the Old Stone Steps.

In 2008 within the framework of preparations for the upcoming 150th birth anniversary of Anton Chekhov, a sculptural composition "Romance with the Double Bass" dedicated to Chekhov's story of the same name was unveiled on the Pushkin Embankment.

The embankment has been one of the most popular places for promenades and jogging among the Taganrogers and visitors of the city, and also serves as the central arena for open-air concerts and Day of the City celebrations.

== Gallery ==
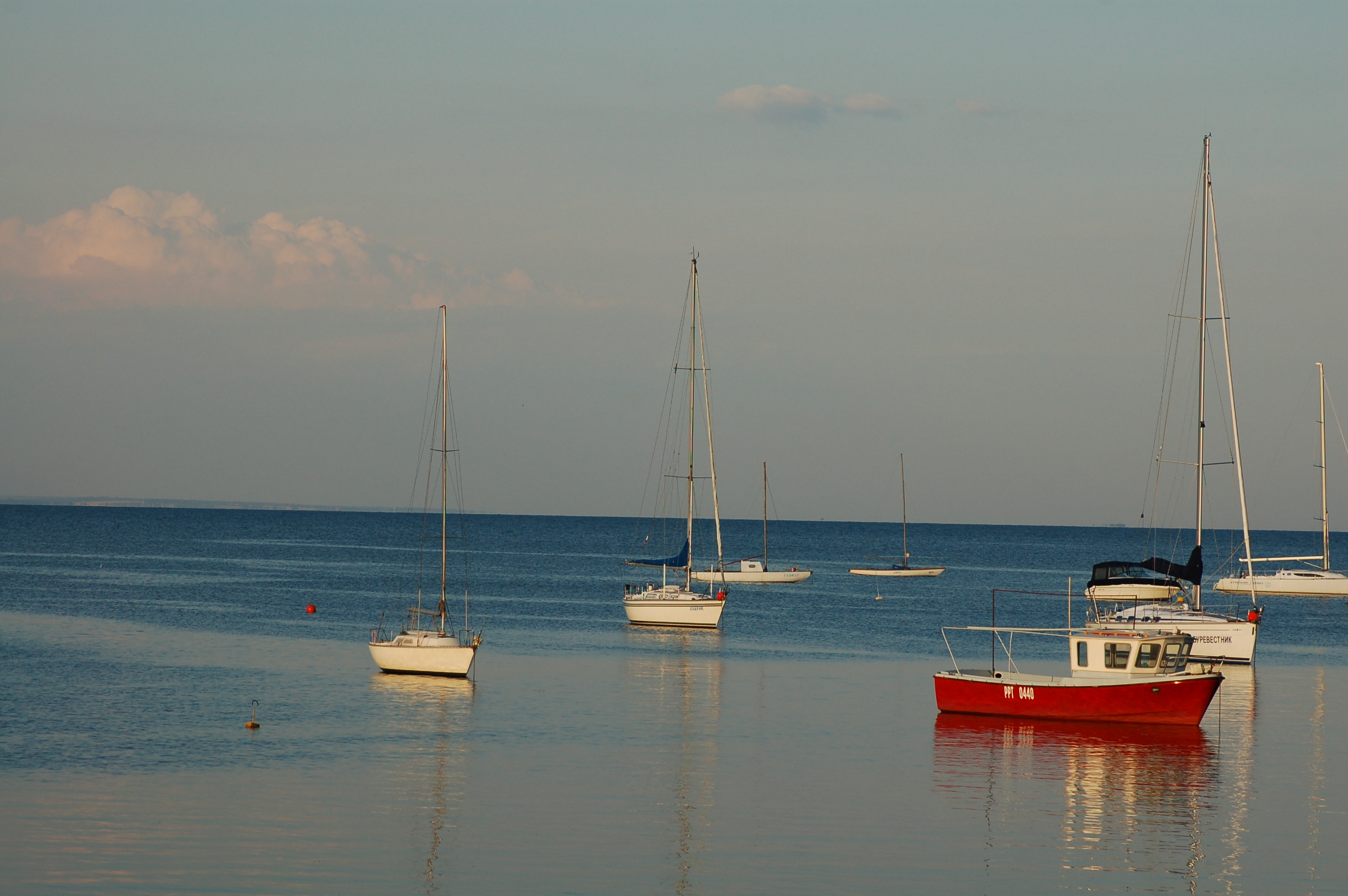
Yachts in the Gulf of Taganrog, Azov Sea. View from the Pushkin Embankment.

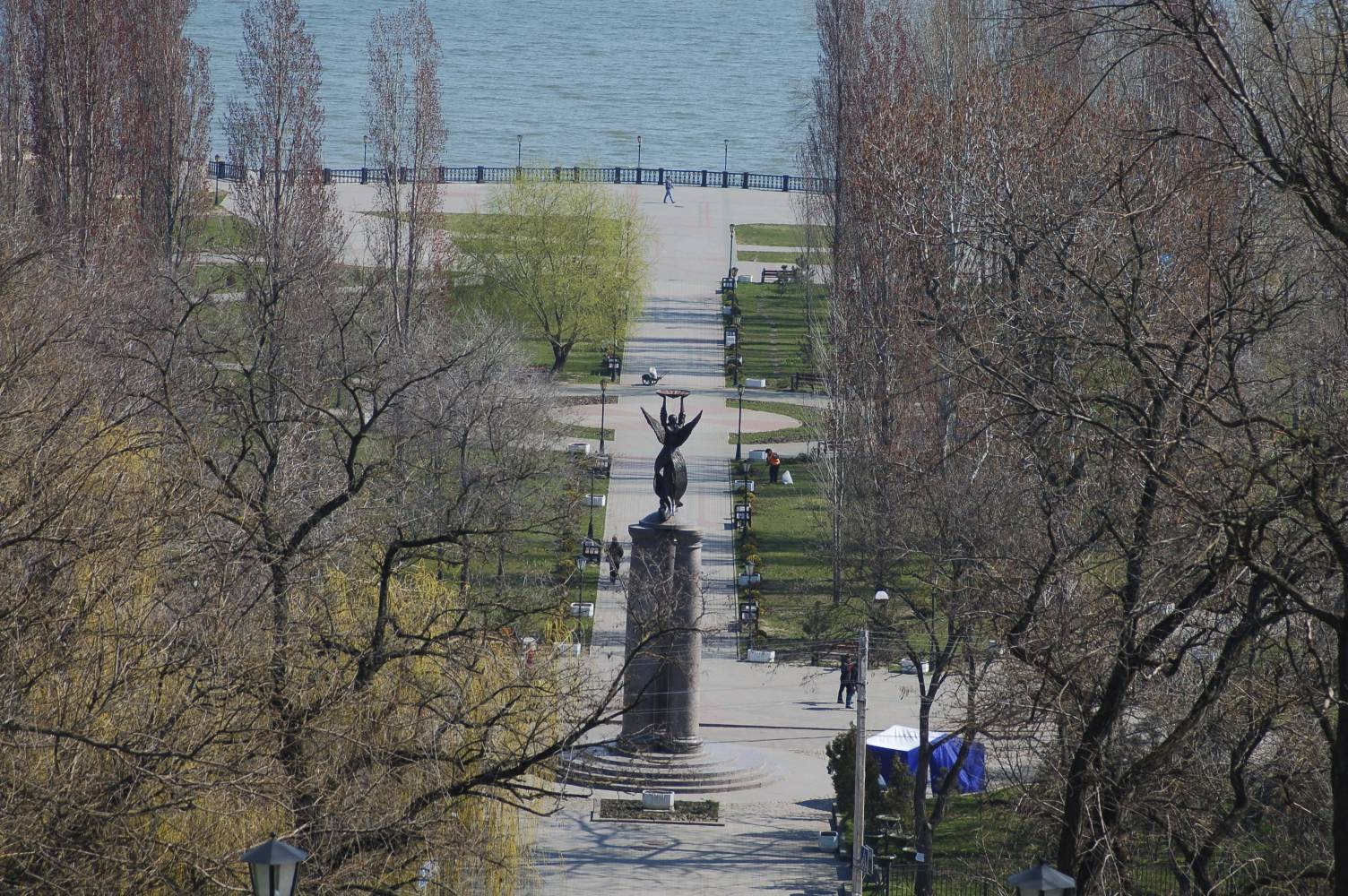
View on the Pushkin Embankment from the top of the Old Stone Steps.

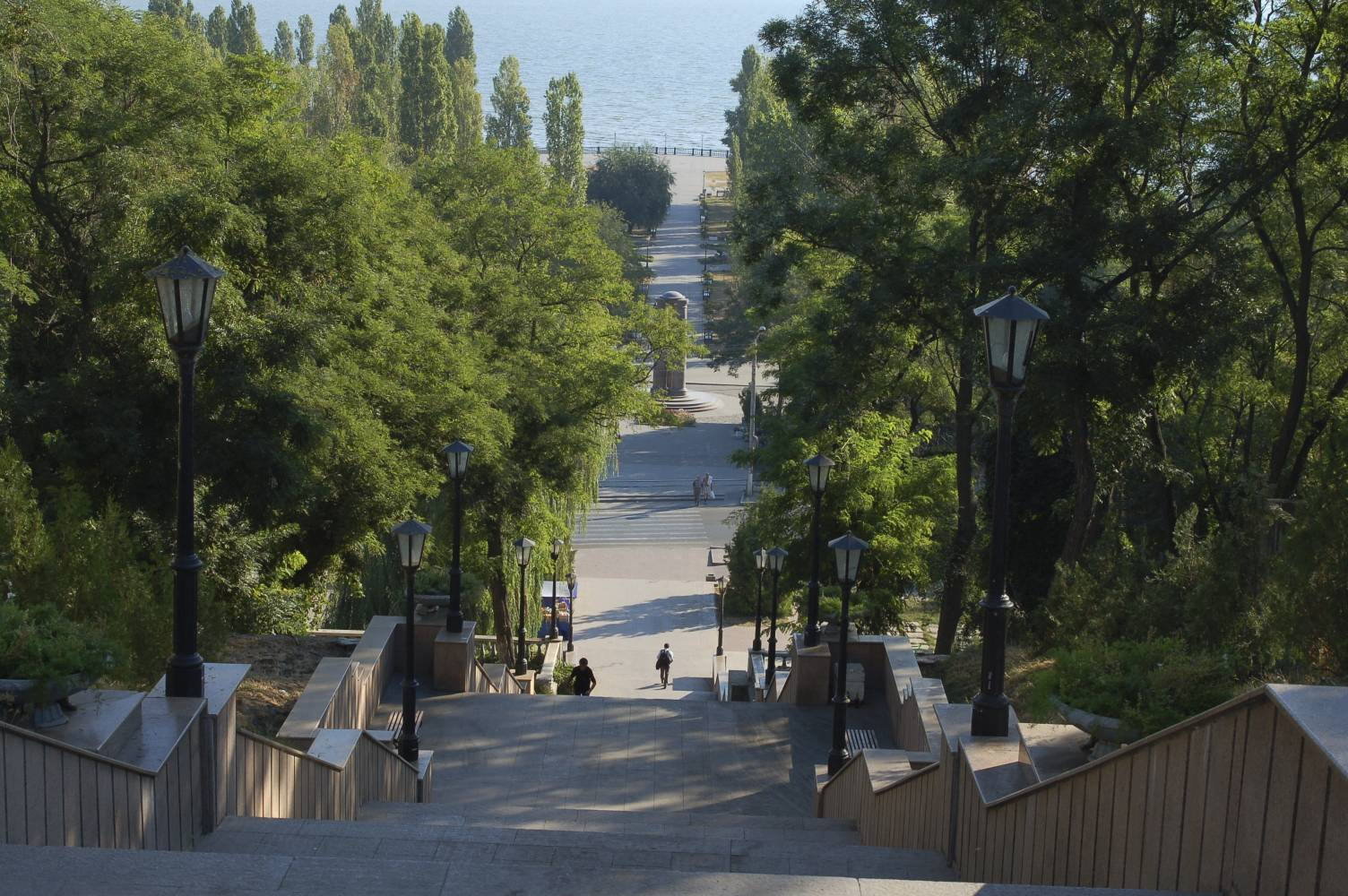
Old Stone Steps, view from the Grecheskaya Street towards the Gulf of Taganrog and the Pushkin Embankment.

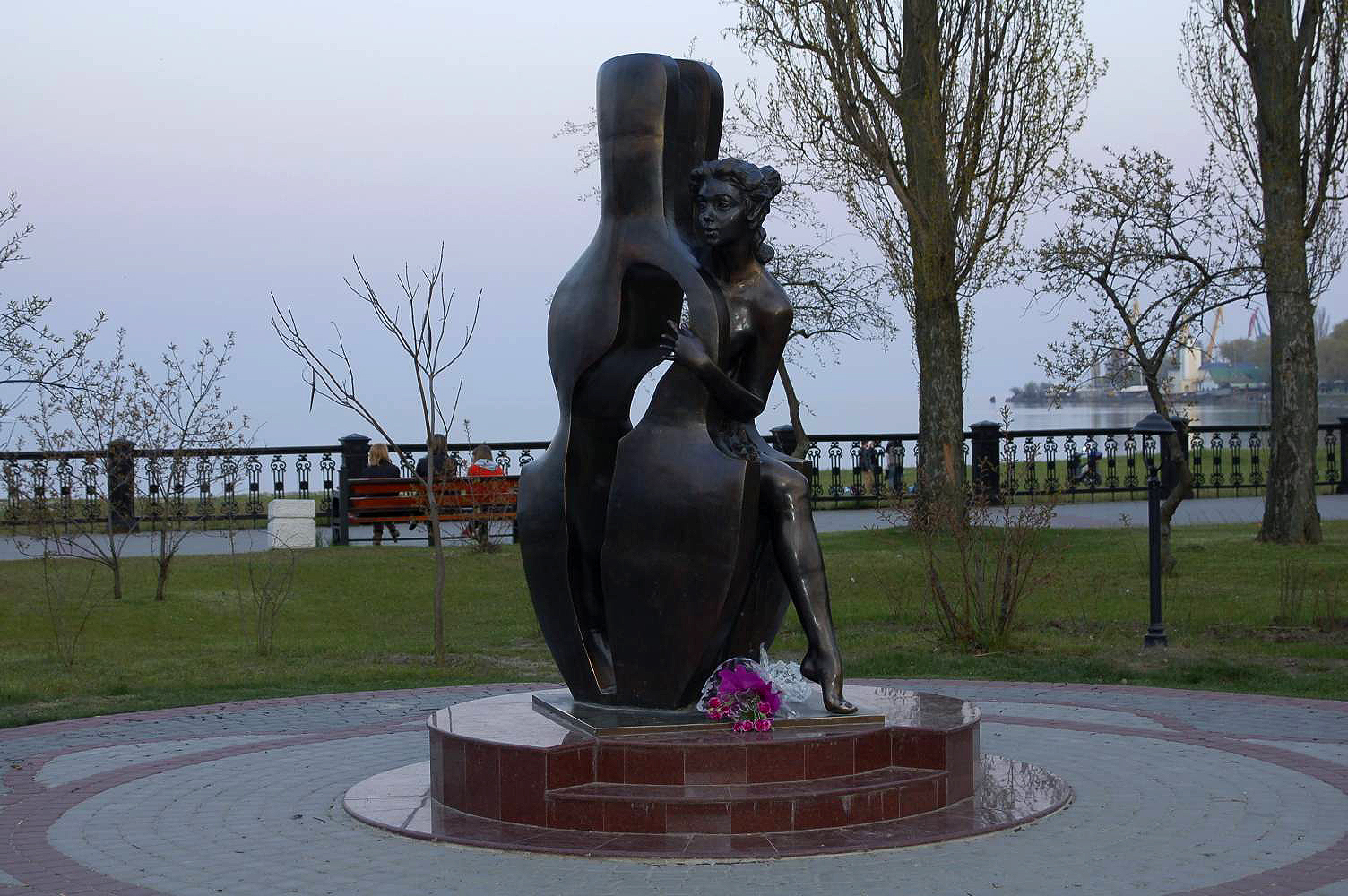
Sculptural composition "Romance with the Double Bass" dedicated to Chekhov's story of the same name.

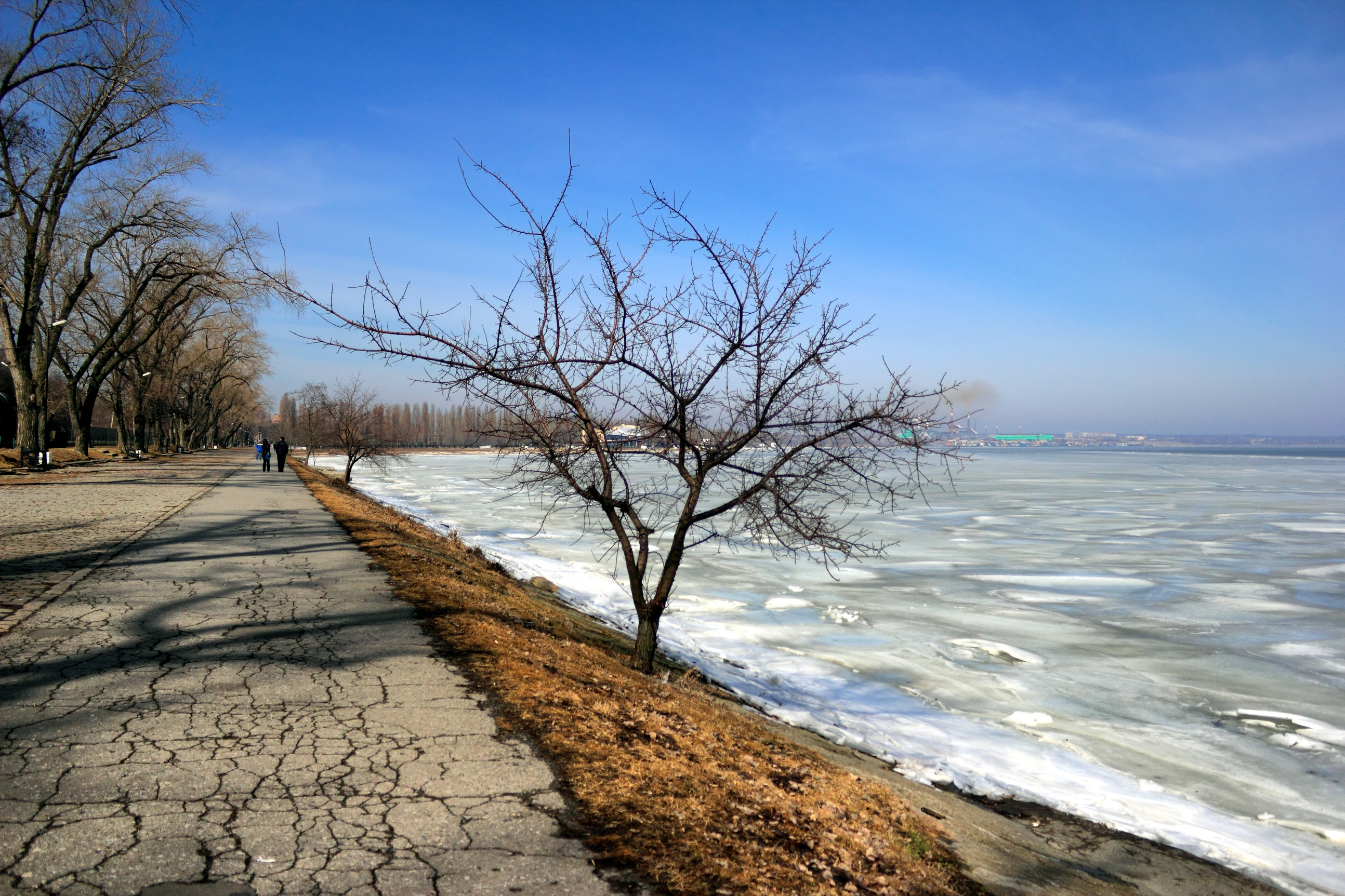
Pushkin Embankment in winter of 2011.

== External links and references ==
- «Энциклопедия Таганрога». — Ростов-на-Дону: Ростиздат, 2003 - ISBN 5-7509-0662-0.
