= Ostap Dashkevych =

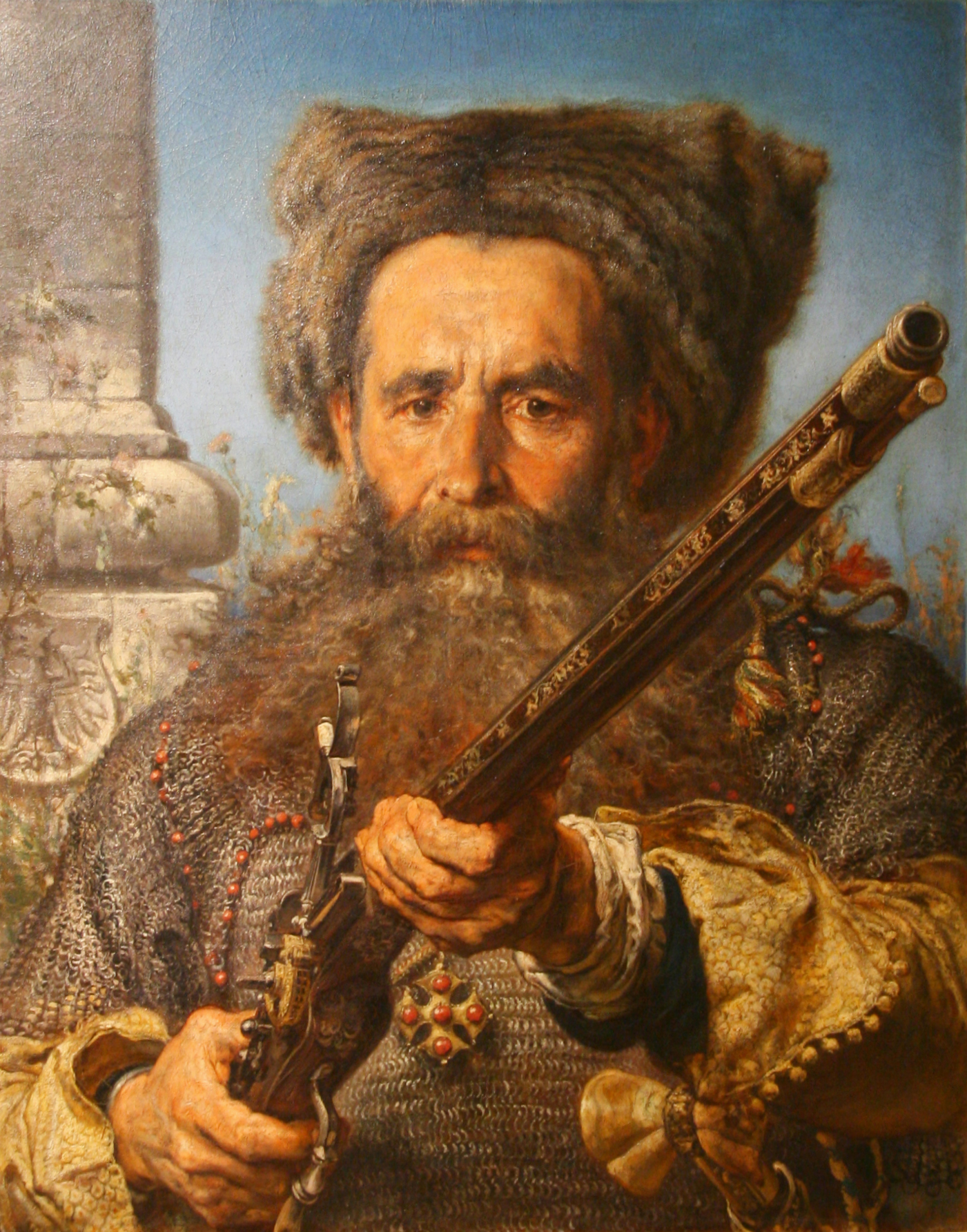
19th century representation of Ostap Dashkevych by Jan Matejko, Silesian Museum (Katowice)

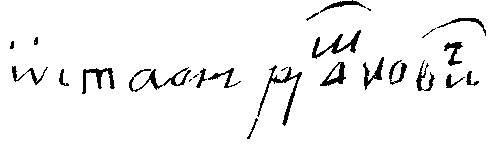
Signature of Ostap Dashkevych ("Otaman Dashkovych")

Ostaphii "Ostap" Dashkevych or Dashkovych (Ukrainian: Остафій Дашкевич, Остафій Іванович Дашкович; born in Ovruch 1470 – died after 1535) was one of the earliest recorded leaders of an organized Cossack defense force.

Dashkevych held a position of starosta in Cherkasy and Kaniv (1514–35). At the early stages of development of Cossacks he was informally referred to as a ataman. Some sources as well as oral tradition claim that Dashkevych lived past the age of 80, at which age he routed the Tatars at Cherkasy.

== Biography ==
Daszkiewicz coat of arms

Leliwa III

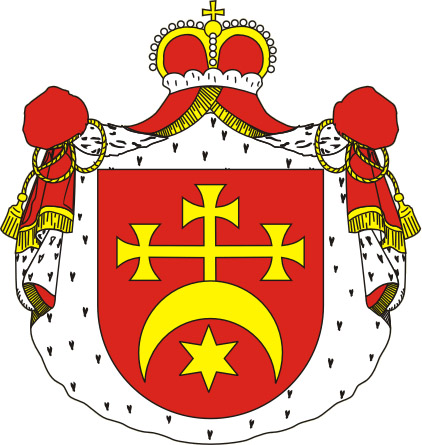
Korybut

The information about his origin is very scarce. The Polish poet from Kyiv region Józef Bohdan Zaleski in the foreword of his duma "Out of the Savur's Grave or duma about the first hetman" wrote that in his childhood he heard stories about Daszko Wisnowecki who lived on the Knyahynia [Princess] island just south of Kodak. According to the folk tale, the prince perished in his youth leaving on the island his wife (supposedly of Polish origin) and his son who eventually became a glorious Cossack hetman. Zaleski suggests that Ostap Dashkevych was a son of Daszko Wisnowecki. In his opinion, the origin of Dashkevych from the Princes Wisnoweckis could be confirmed as Ostap Dashkevych has the same family coat of arms. According to Seweryn Uruski, a Polish heraldry specialist, Dashkevych belonged to the Leliwa coat of arms.

Ostap Dashkevych of Orthodox Christian religion, he was presumably a descendant of Rurikid and Gengisid from Ovruch. Dashkevych also became known as a founder of Zaporizhian Host. He donated his lands near Kyiv to the Church of Resurrection of Christ at Podil in Kyiv. His estate eventually transformed into the village of Voskresenska Slobidka and later gave a name to the Voskresenka neighborhood which is now a part of modern Kyiv on the left bank of Dnieper.

He took part in the 1507 uprising of Michael Glinski against King Zygmunt I the Old. In 1514, he became the starosta of both Kaniv and Cherkasy.

Dashkevych was an effective leader. He took a major role in not only organizing Cossack forces to defend Ukraine but also in organizing offensive campaigns against the Turks and Tatars. In Piotrków in 1533, he gave his plan to the Sejm, recommending that the government of the Polish–Lithuanian Commonwealth organize the Cossacks as a standing military force for the defense of Ukraine, which at the time made up the southern border of the Commonwealth. His plan was approved, but the Commonwealth provided no assistance.

== In literature ==
Dashkevych's successful rout of the Crimean Tatars' attempt to sack Cherkasy is commemorated in Tomasz Padura's ballad "Duma Rycerska".

== See also ==
- Registered Cossacks
- Hetman of Zaporizhian Cossacks

== Sources ==
- Dmytro Doroshenko, A Survey of Ukrainian History, ed. Oleh Gerus (Winnipeg, 1975).
- Ostafii Dashkevych at Encyclopedia of Ukraine
- Handbook on the History of Ukraine
- Subtelny, Orest (1988). Ukraine: A History (1st ed.). Toronto: University of Toronto Press. ISBN 0-8020-8390-0.
- Chirovsky, Nicholas L. (1984). An Introduction to Ukrainian History. Volume II: the Polish Domination and the Cossack-Hetman State. New York: Philosophical Library. ISBN 0-8022-2407-5.
- Yakovenko, Natalia (2006). An Outline History of Medieval and Early Modern Ukraine. Krytyka. ISBN 9667679829.
