= Mehmed I Giray =

Khan of Crimea from 1515 to 1523

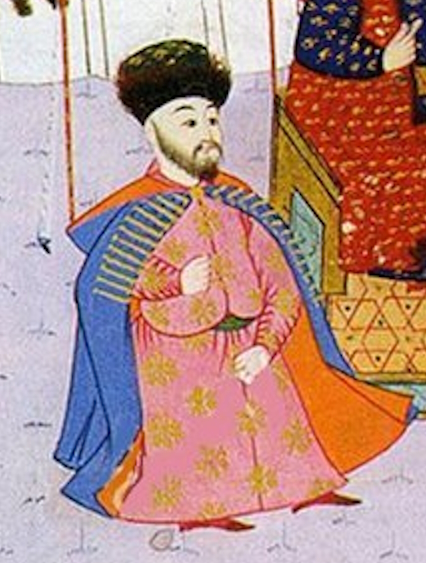
- Mehmed I Giray, at the court of Ottoman sultan Bayezid II. Hünername

Khan of the Tatar Crimean Khanate
- Reign: 1515–1523
- Predecessor: Meñli I Giray
- Successor: Ğazı I Giray
- Born: 30 November 1465
- Died: October 1523 (aged 57); Astrakhan
- Spouse: Nurum Sultan Khatun
- Issue: Ğazı I Giray; İslâm I Giray...see below
- Dynasty: Giray dynasty
- Father: Meñli I Giray
- Religion: Islam

Mehmed I Giray (Note: Crimean Tatar, Ottoman Turkish and Persian: محمد کرای.) (1465–1523, reigned 1515–1523) was khan of the Crimean Khanate. He was preceded by his father Meñli I Giray (r. 1478–1515) and followed by his son Ğazı I Giray (1523–1524). He gained control of the steppe nomads, put his brother on the throne of Kazan and was killed after taking Astrakhan.

== As kalga ==
As his father's kalga or designated successor and co-ruler, he participated in a number of raids northward. In 1505 he and his father raided what is now Belarus. In 1507 they advanced toward Russia, but turned back on learning of a Nogai raid on Crimea. Mehmed fell from his horse and became ill. The force returned to Crimea. In 1509 the Nogais planned to attack Crimea. Mehmed and a very large army defeated them as they were crossing the Volga. Much booty was taken. In 1510 he was also successful against the Nogais. In 1512 he raided Russia but was driven back by troops from Ryazan. In 1514 he was driven back from the Severia. In 1515, in alliance with the Lithuanians he besieged Novgorod-Seversky. Starodub and Chernogov and took many captives. (A common tactic was to bottle up troops in the towns and loot the surrounding countryside.). For these raids see Crimean-Nogai Raids#List of raids for 1505–1523.

== As khan ==
When his father died in April 1515 Mehmed was at Perekop. The old khan's death was concealed for forty days until Mehmed reached the capital. (the reason for this is not given).

=== Akhmed's rebellion ===
He appointed as kalga his younger brother Akhmed the Lame. Akhmed was given Ochakov and raided Lithuania but soon revolted. He intrigued with Moscow and sent his eldest son Gemmet to Istanbul to request military aid against Mehmed. In the spring of 1519 Mehmed sent his sons Alp and Bakhadyr against Akhmed, who was killed in the steppe beyond Perekop. Bakhadyr became kalga. Alp became kalga in 1523 when Bakhadyr became khan of Astrakhan. (Howorth (1880), following Nikolay Karamzin (1818) speaks of intrigues and bribes involving Akhmed, Mehmed, Vasili III of Russia and Sigismund the Old of Poland).

=== Nogais ===
A major problem of his reign was gaining control of the Nogai nomads to the north who had become fragmented after the fall of the Golden Horde in 1502. In 1519 a Kazakh invasion drove many Nogais west of the Volga. They asked asylum in the Khan's territory. Two years later the Kazakh Khan died and the Nogais pushed back east, but their oath was not forgotten and the Crimean khan could claim sovereignty as far east as the Emba. Crimea continued to raid Lithuania and Russia.

=== Kazan and Moscow ===
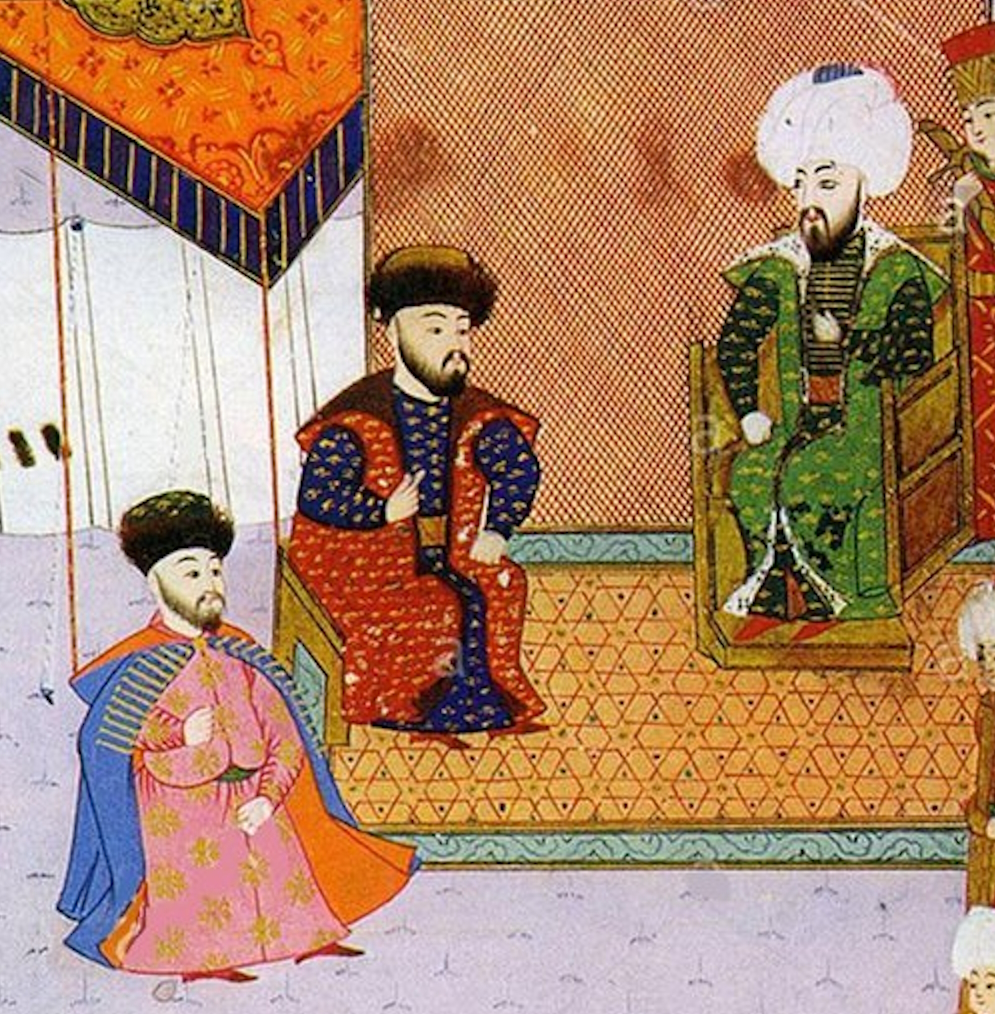
Meñli I Giray (centre) with the eldest son, future khan Mehmed I Giray (left) and Ottoman sultan Bayezid II (right).

In 1519 the Russians placed their protégé Shah Ali on the throne of Kazan. The local mirzas asked Mehmed to send one of his family to replace Shah Ali. In the spring of 1521 Mehmed's brother Sahib I Giray arrived at Kazan and easily expelled Shah Ali with local help. The two brother Khans then launched an attack on Muscovy. Sahib Giray went west and captured and burned Nizhny Novgorod and Vladimir. At the same time 100,000 Crimeans, Nogais and Lithuanians moved north and crossed the Oka River in July. The two forces joined near Kolomna and moved on Moscow. Vasili III of Russia fled his capital for Volokolamsk to gather troops. They looted the area around Moscow from 1 to 12 August. On the approach of Vasili's army they drew back and looted the regions of Kolomna, Bobrovsk, Kashira and Ryazan. An attempt to besiege Ryazan failed. Mehmed returned to the steppe with a huge number of captives.

=== Astrakhan ===
At the end of 1522 Mehmed decided to capture Astrakhan. The Nogai Mirzas Agish and Mamai joined him. In the spring of 1523 he arrived with a large army. The town was taken without fighting and Khan Hussein fled. Mehmed appointed his eldest son Kalga Bakhadyr as khan of Astrakhan and unwisely disbanded most of his army. Agish and Mamai grew fearful of Mehmet's increasing power. They lured him out of town and killed Mehmet and Bakhadyr along with their guards. The remaining Crimean troops were defeated or scattered across the steppe.

Abdullah ibn Rıdvan in his chronicle Tevarikh-i Desht-i Kipchak ("Chronicles of Desht-i Kipchak") claims that Mehmed Giray was killed by Circassians and Dadianis instead of Nogais, stating:

For some time his rule extended over the Steppe of Kipchak. [After that, he dispatched a heavy army against the Circassians and the Dadban (Dadyan), who were in rebellion and insubordination, and while passing the stream called Taman Su.] At length, when the appointed time came, and finding no escape from sudden death, he surrendered his soul.

The mention of Dadianis is unclear, but Circassians may have united with the Astrakhan Khanate against Crimeans. Another, less likely possibility is that instead of blaming Nogais, who were mostly loyal to Crimeans, ibn Rıdvan wanted to blame Circassians, who were their enemies.

Mehmet's sons Gazi and Baba reached Crimea along with fifty Mirzas. They were followed by a Nogai army which ravaged much of Crimea but could not take the towns. Mehmed's son Ğazı I Giray (1523–24) became khan. For the next nine years the throne was contested between Mehmed's sons Gazi and Islam and his brothers Saadet and Sahib until his youngest brother Sahib I Giray (1532–1551) achieved a long reign.

== Family ==
He was married to Nurum Sultan Khatun, daughter of Hasan Bey, of the Manghits. Mehmed had at least these children:

- Ğazı I Giray (1504–1524, ruled 1523–24);
- İslâm I Giray (ruled 1532, died 1537);
- Bakhadyr;
- Alp;
- Baba;
- Choban;
- Uzbeg;
- only known daughter is Aybige Hatun.
