= Monument of Glory, Samara =

Monument of Glory
- Russian: Монумент славы
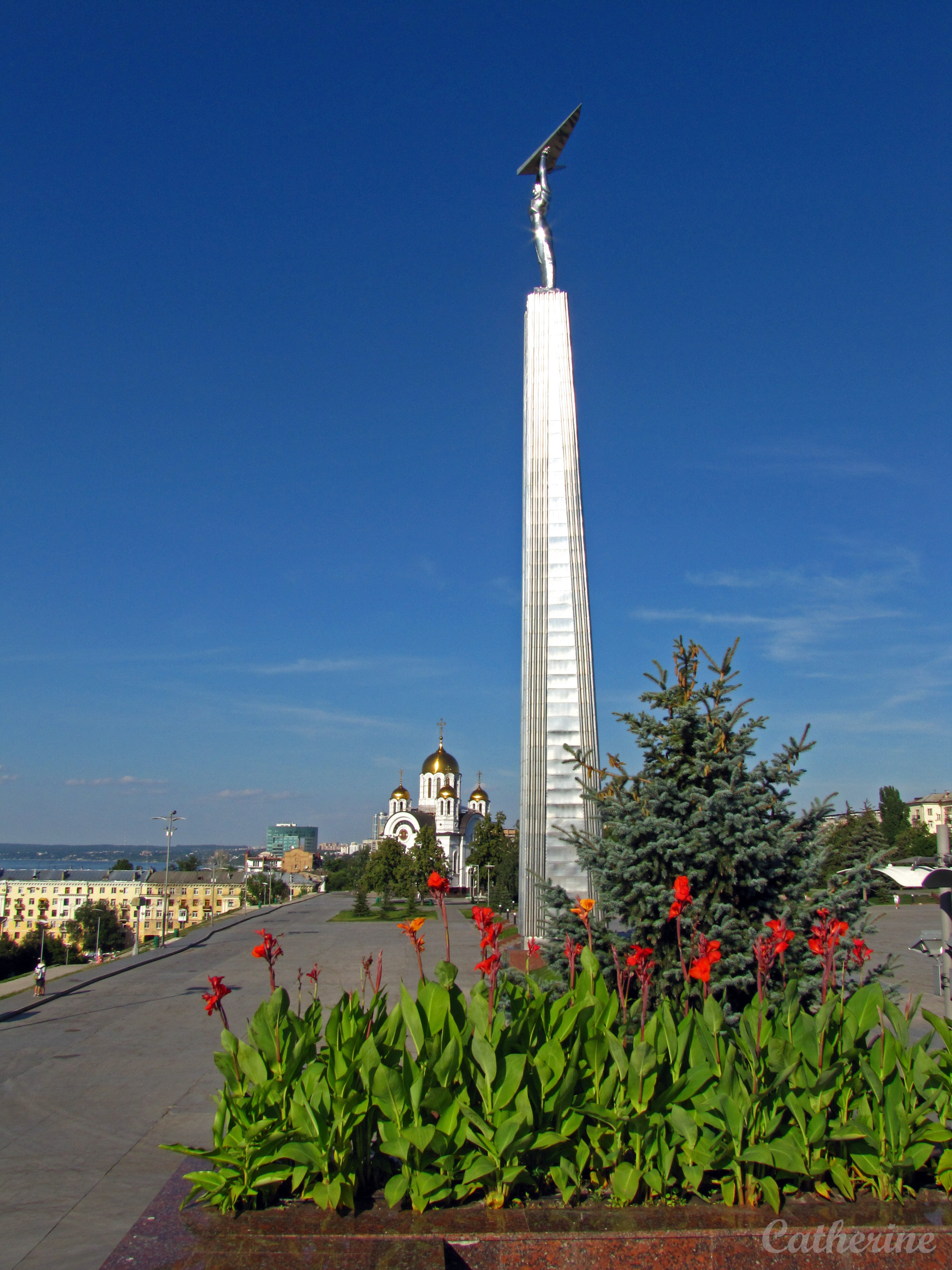
- The monument in 2011
- Interactive map of Monument of Glory
- Location: Slavy Square in Samara, Russia
- Coordinates: 53°12′13″N 50°06′35″E
- Designer: P. Bondarenko, O. Kiryuhin, A. Samsonov
- Type: Monument
- Material: High alloy steel
- Opening date: 1968

The Monument of Glory (Russian: Монумент славы, romanized: Monument slavy) is the focal point of Slavy Square in Samara (formerly Kuybyshev), Russia, overlooking the Volga river to the north-west. It is dedicated to the Kuybyshev workers of the aircraft industry of the Soviet Union. The monument is one of the most prominent symbols of Samara. Moscow sculptors Pavel Bondarenko, Oleg Kiryuhin and architect A. Samsonov created a design of the thirteen-meter-tall figure, made from high alloy steel with wings raised over his head and forty-meter pedestal. The pedestal symbolizes a ray of light rising to the sky.

The monument was erected between 1968 and 1971, funded by donations of Kuybyshev workers and other staff members of production plants. Every worker could donate only one rouble. Kuybyshev mayor's office chose a place for the monument in the city centre in the Leninsky district. The opening ceremony took place on 5 November 1971.

== Historical background ==
Kuybyshev was a major aircraft industry center of the Soviet Union during the Second World War. 28,000 Ilyushin Il-2 and Ilyushin Il-10 ground-attack aircraft were made in Kuybyshev's factories No. 1 and No. 18, representing 80 percent of inventory.
