= Samara =

City in Samara Oblast, Russia

Samara Самара Kuybyshev
- City
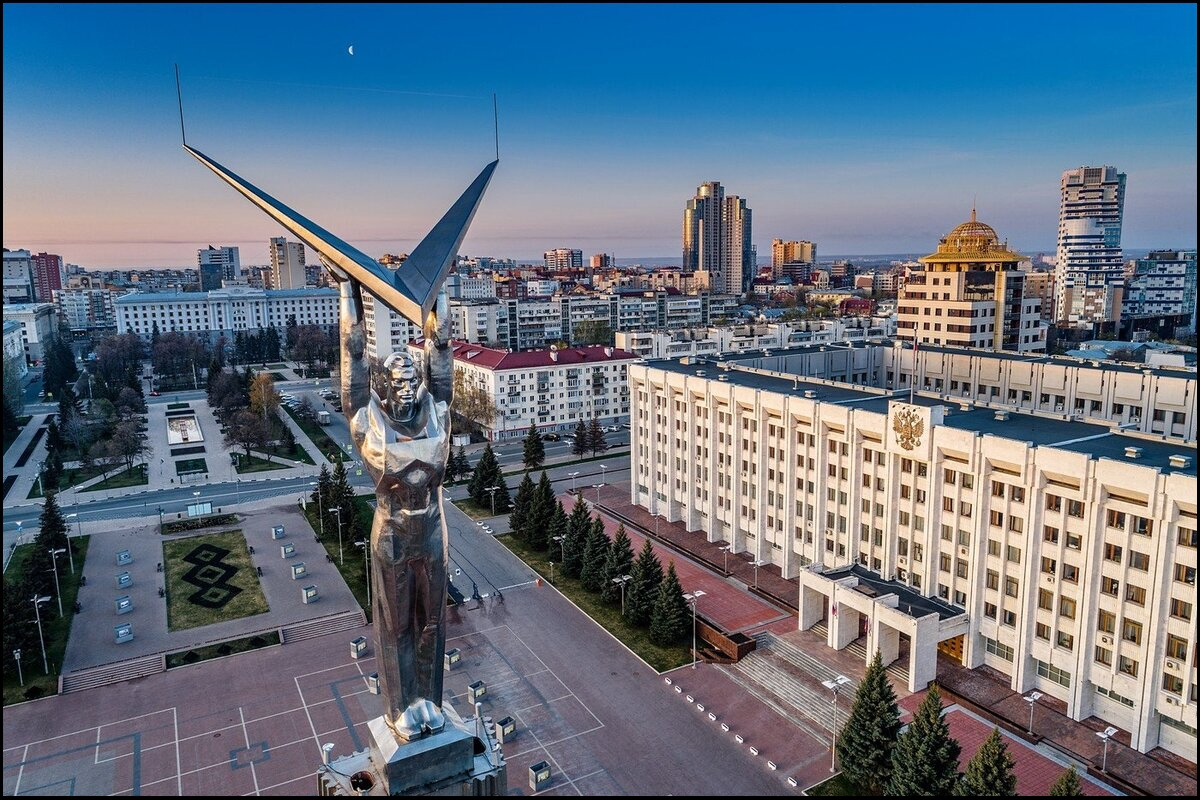
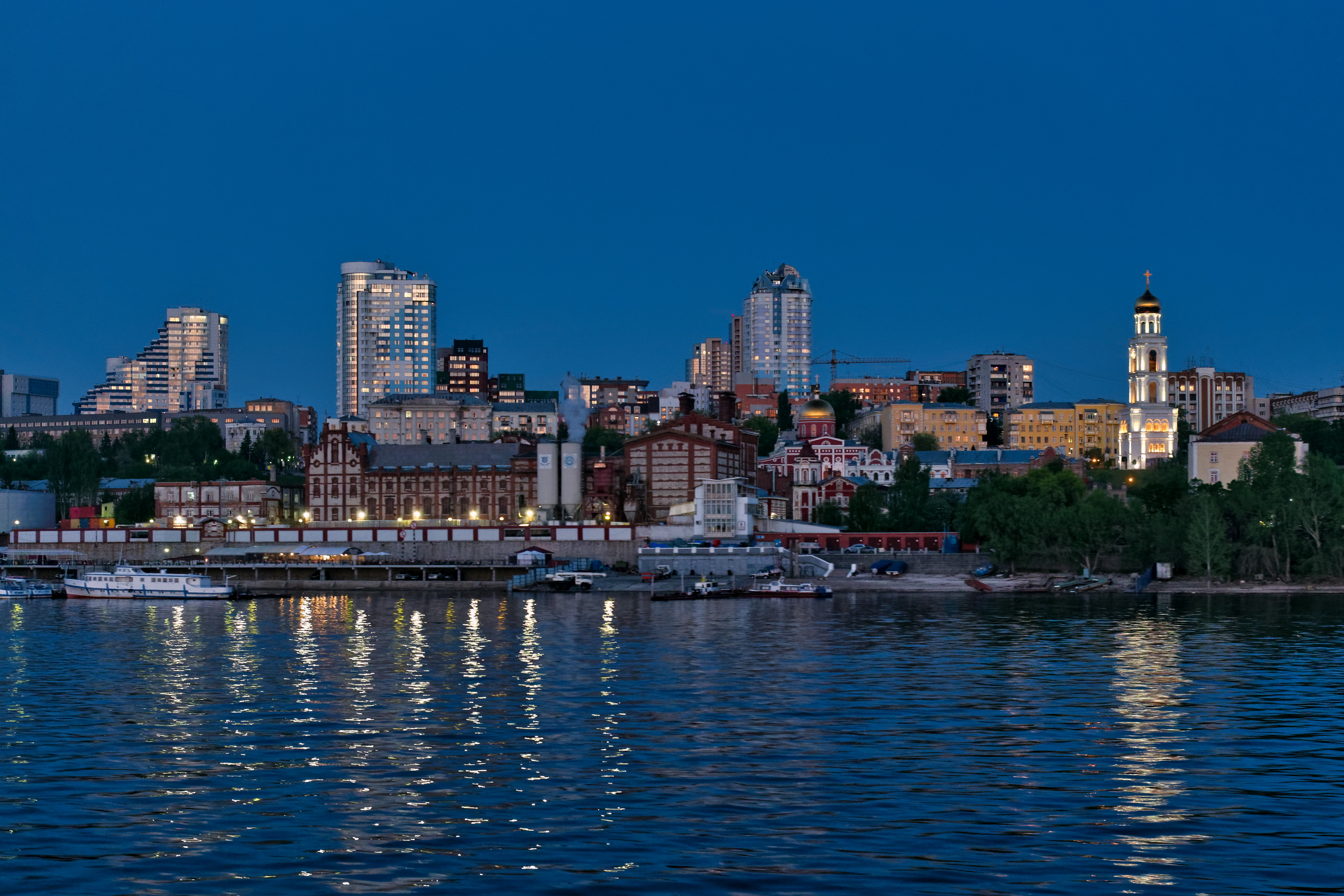
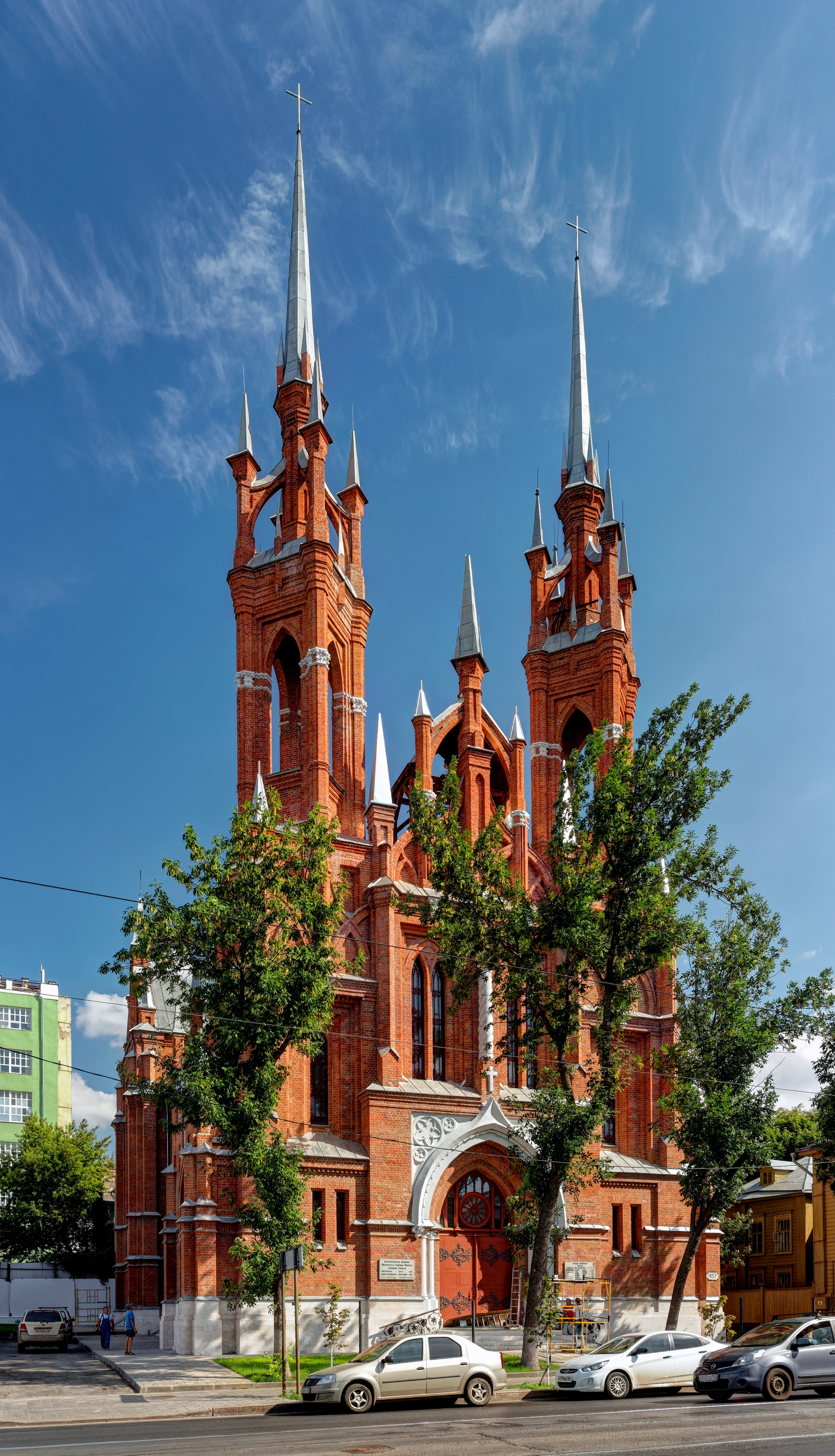
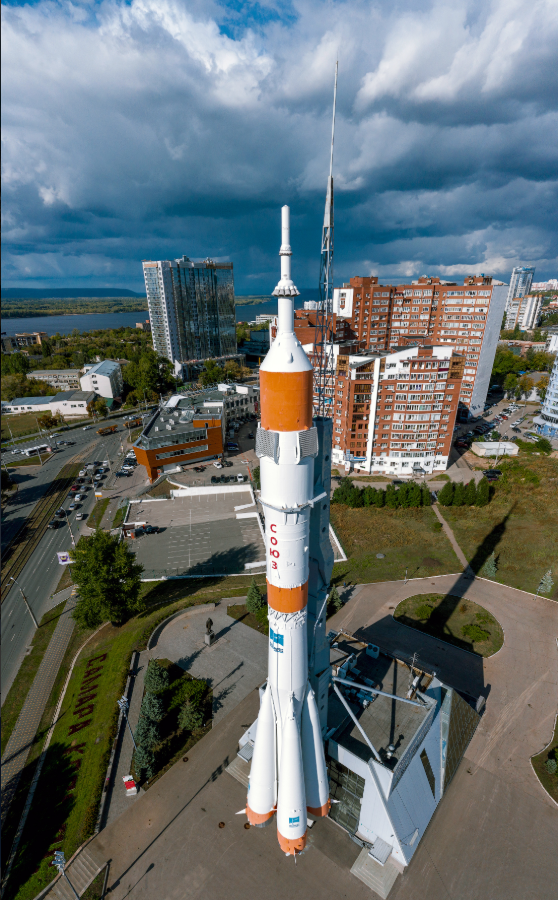
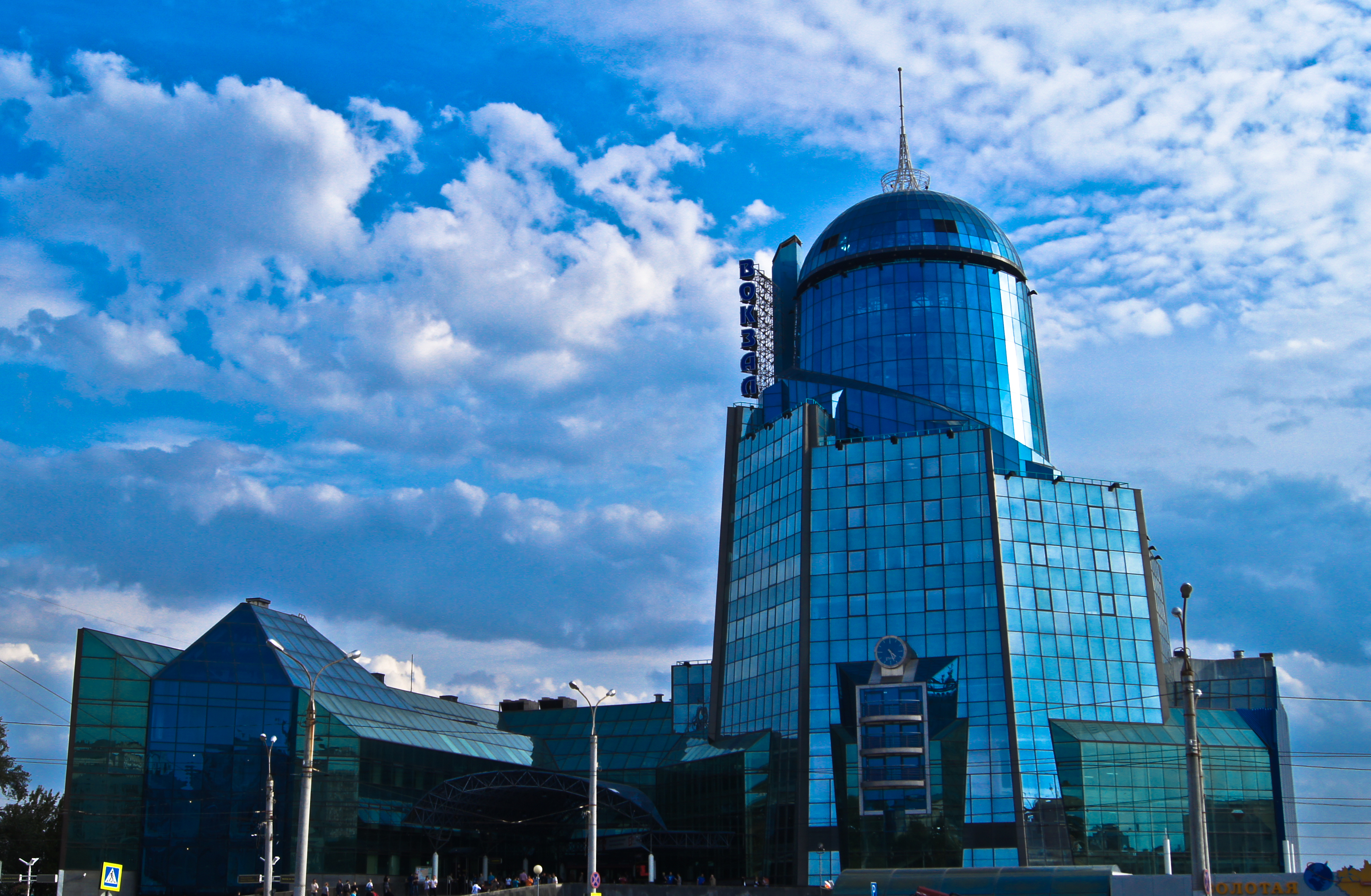
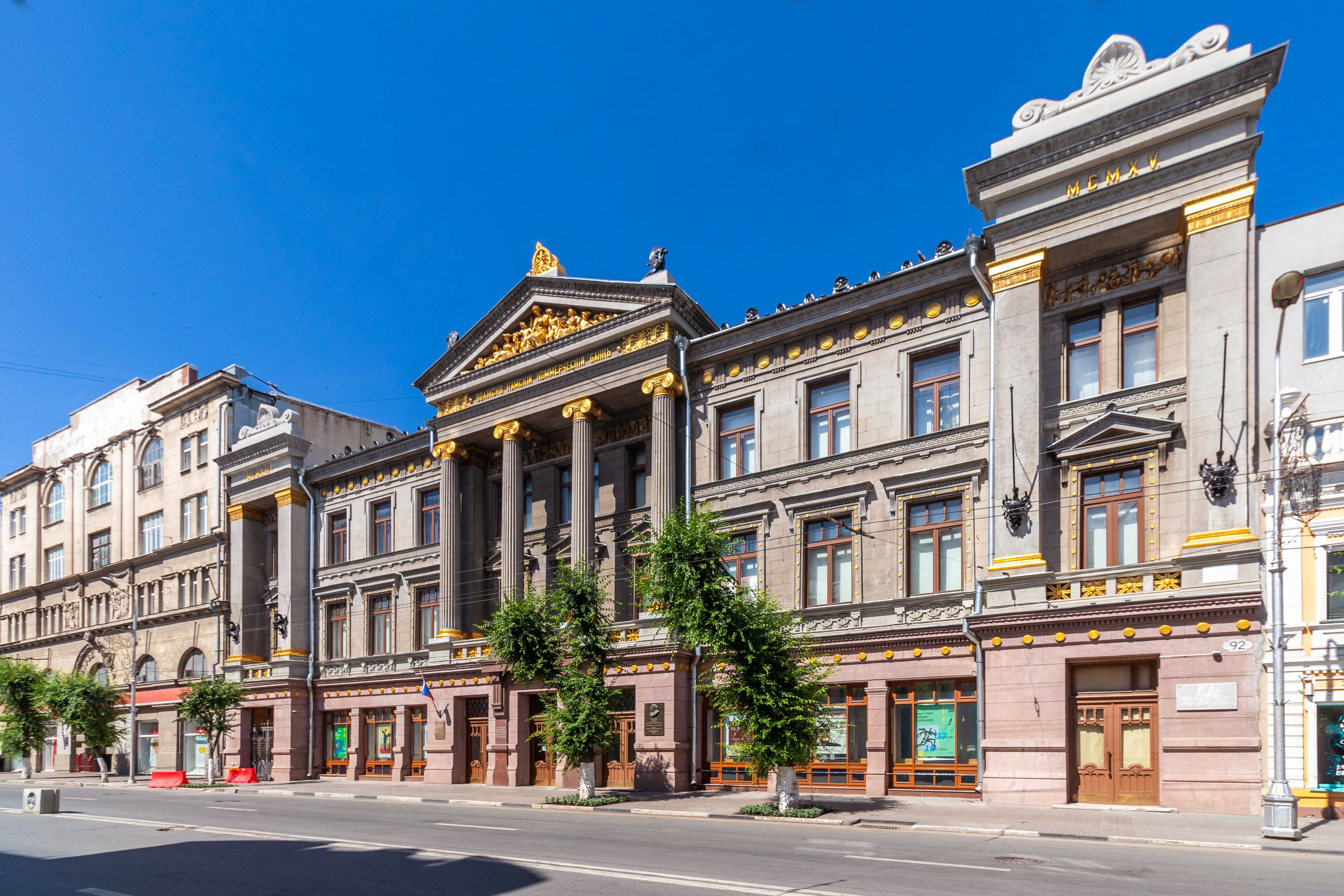
- Monument of Glory Skyline along the Volga river Sacred Heart Church Soyuz carrier rocket monument Samara railway station Samara Art Museum

- Flag Coat of arms
- Interactive map of Samara
- Location of Samara Samara (European Russia) Samara (Russia) Samara (Europe)
- Coordinates: 53°12′10″N 50°08′27″E
- Country: Russia
- Federal subject: Samara Oblast
- Founded: 1586
- City status since: 1688

Government
  - Body: City Duma
  - Head: Ivan Noskov

Area
  - Total: 541.4 km^{2} (209.0 sq mi)
- Elevation: 100 m (330 ft)

Population (2010 Census)
  - Total: 1,164,685
  - Estimate (2025): 1,144,759 (−1.7%)
  - Rank: sixth in 2010
  - Density: 2,151/km^{2} (5,572/sq mi)

Administrative status
  - Subordinated to: city of oblast significance of Samara
  - Capital of: Samara Oblast, Volzhsky District

Municipal status
  - Urban okrug: Samara Urban Okrug
  - Capital of: Samara Urban Okrug, Volzhsky Municipal District
- Time zone: UTC+4 (MSK+1)
- Postal code: 443XXX
- Dialing code: +7 846
- OKTMO ID: 36701000001

Samara, (Note: See #Etymology below) known as Kuybyshev from 1935 to 1991, is the largest city and the administrative centre of Samara Oblast in Russia. It is sited at the confluence of the Volga and the Samara rivers. The city has a population of over 1.14 million residents, with up to 1.22 million residents in the urban agglomeration (not including Novokuybyshevsk, which is not conurbated). The city covers an area of 541.4 square kilometers (209.0 sq mi), and is the ninth-largest city and tenth-largest agglomeration in Russia, and the third-most populous city on the Volga and in the Volga Federal District.

Formerly a closed city, Samara is now a large and important social, political, economic, industrial, and cultural centre in Russia and hosted the European Union—Russia Summit in May 2007. It has a continental climate characterised by hot summers and cold winters. The life of Samara's citizens has always been intrinsically linked to the Volga River, which has not only served as the main commercial thoroughfare of Russia throughout several centuries, but also has great visual appeal. Samara's riverfront is one of the main recreation sites for both local citizens and tourists.

== Etymology ==
- Current name: Samara, Russian: Самара, IPA: [sɐˈmarə]), /səˈmɑːrə/ sə-MAR-ə;
- Former name: Kuybyshev, Куйбышев; IPA: [ˈkujbɨʂɨf]

Samara is named after the Samara River, which likely meant "summer water" (signifying that it froze in winter) in the Indo-Iranian language which was spoken there around the third millennium BC. The Samara city gives its name to the Samara culture, a Neolithic culture of the fifth millennium BC, and the Kurgan hypothesis associates the region with the original homeland (urheimat) of the Proto-Indo-European language.

During Soviet times, the city of Samara was renamed to Kuybyshev in 1935 in honor of the Russian Bolshevik, Valerian Kuybyshev. The city reverted to its historical name of Samara on 25 January 1991.

== History ==
=== Early history ===
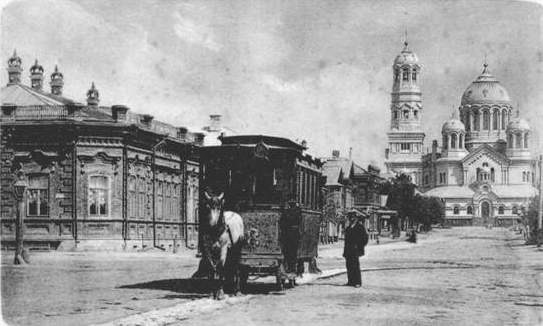
Sobornaya Street and horse tram in 1905

Samara, together with its northern neighbour Kazan, is at the centre of the Idel-Ural historical region. Ahmad ibn Fadlan visited the area that is now Samara around 921 while on his journey to the Volga Bulgars who then controlled the region from their capital Bolghar.

The Volga port of Samara appears on Italian maps of the 14th century. Before 1586, the Samara Bend was a pirate nest. Lookouts would spot an oncoming boat and quickly cross to the other side of the peninsula so that the pirates could organize an attack. Officially, Samara started with a fortress built in 1586 at the confluence of the Volga and Samara Rivers. This fortress was a frontier post protecting the then easternmost boundaries of Russia from forays of nomads. A local customs office was established in 1600.

As more and more ships pulled into Samara's port, the town turned into a centre for diplomatic and economic links between Russia and the East. Samara also opened its gates to peasant war rebels headed by Stepan Razin and Yemelyan Pugachyov, welcoming them with traditional bread and salt. The town was visited by Peter the Great and later Tsars.

In 1780, Samara was turned into an uyezd town of Simbirsk Governorate overseen by the local Governor-General, and Uyezd and Zemstvo Courts of Justice and a Board of Treasury were established. On January 1, 1851, Samara became the centre of Samara Governorate with an estimated population of 20,000. This gave a stimulus to the development of the economic, political and cultural life of the community. Samara was outside of the Pale of Settlement and as such did not have any significant Jewish population until the late 19th century. In 1877, during the Russian-Turkish War, a mission from the Samara City Duma led by Petr Alabin, as a symbol of spiritual solidarity, brought a banner tailored in Samara pierced with bullets and saturated with the blood of both Russians and Bulgarians, to Bulgaria, which has become a symbol of Russian-Bulgarian friendship.

=== Soviet period ===
In 1935, Samara was renamed Kuybyshev in honour of the Bolshevik leader Valerian Kuybyshev.

During World War II, Kuybyshev was chosen to be the alternative capital of the Soviet Union should Moscow fall to the invading Germans. In October 1941, the Communist Party and governmental organisations, diplomatic missions of foreign countries, leading cultural establishments and their staff were evacuated to the city. This decision was reversed in the summer of 1943. A dugout for Joseph Stalin known as "Stalin's Bunker" was constructed but never used. To mark its role as wartime national capital a special Revolution Day parade was held at the city's Kuybyshev Square on November 7, 1941, and since 2011 has been remembered in an annual military parade organised by the city government.

As a leading industrial centre, Kuybyshev played a major role in arming the country. From the very first months of World War II the city supplied the front with aircraft, firearms, and ammunition. Health centres and most of the city's hospital facilities were turned into base hospitals. Polish and Czechoslovak military units were formed on the territory of the Volga Military District. Samara's citizens also fought at the front, many of them volunteers.

After the war the defence industry developed rapidly in Kuybyshev; existing facilities changed their profile and new factories were built, leading to Kuybyshev becoming a closed city. In 1960, Kuybyshev became the missile shield centre for the country. The launch vehicle Vostok, which delivered the first crewed spaceship to orbit, was built at the Samara Progress Plant. Yuri Gagarin, the first man to travel in space on April 12, 1961, took a rest in Kuybyshev after returning to Earth. While there, he spoke to an improvised meeting of Progress workers. Kuybyshev enterprises played a leading role in the development of Soviet domestic aviation and the implementation of the Soviet space program. There is also an unusual monument situated in Samara commemorating an Ilyushin Il-2 ground-attack aircraft assembled by Kuybyshev workers in late 1942. This particular plane was shot down in 1943 over Karelia, but the heavily wounded pilot, K. Kotlyarovsky, managed to crash-land the plane near Lake Oriyarvi. The aircraft was returned to Kuybyshev in 1975, and was placed on display at the intersection of two major roads as a symbol of the deeds of home front servicemen and air force pilots during the Great Patriotic War.

=== Post-Soviet period ===
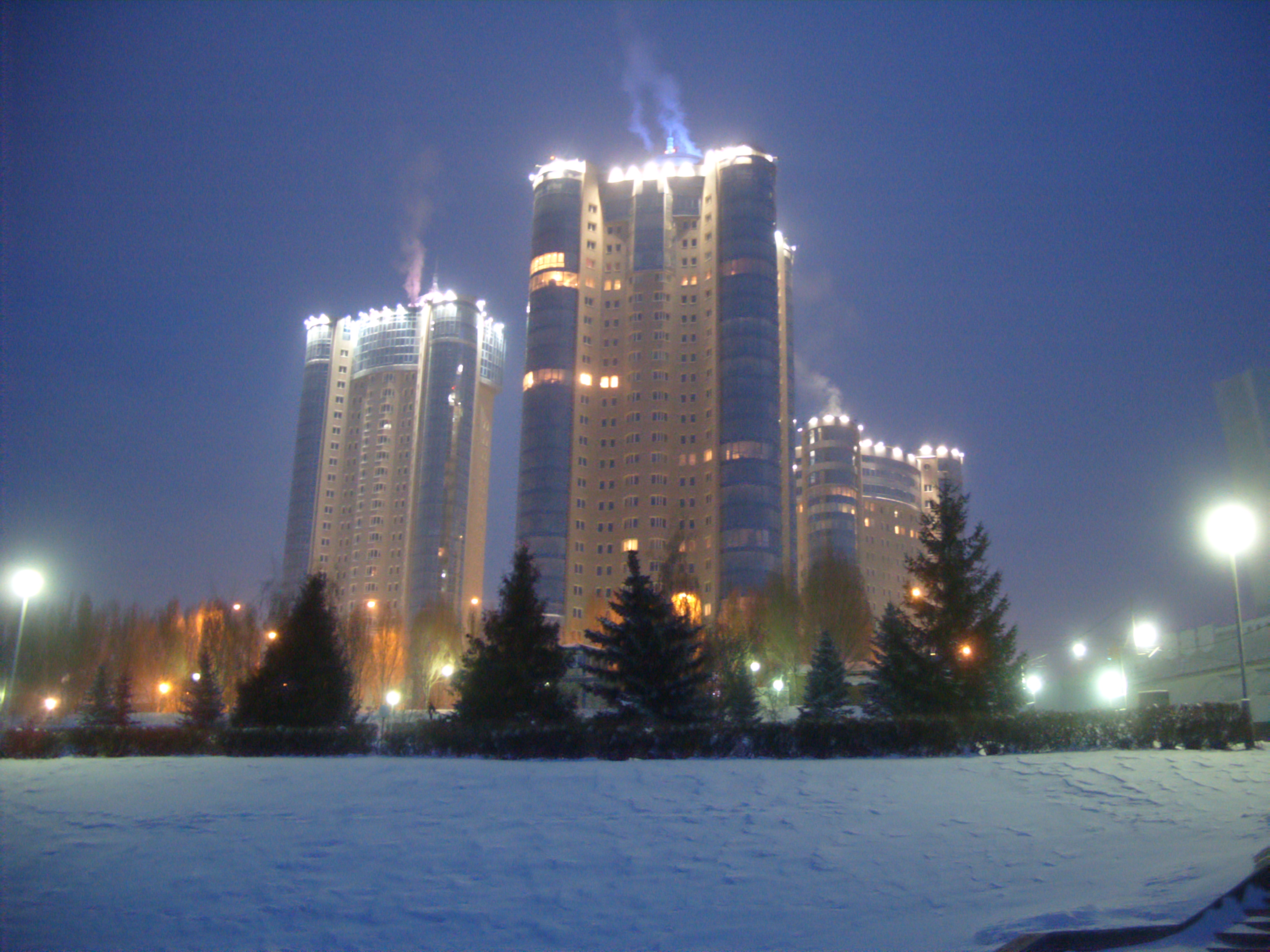
Ladya apartment complex

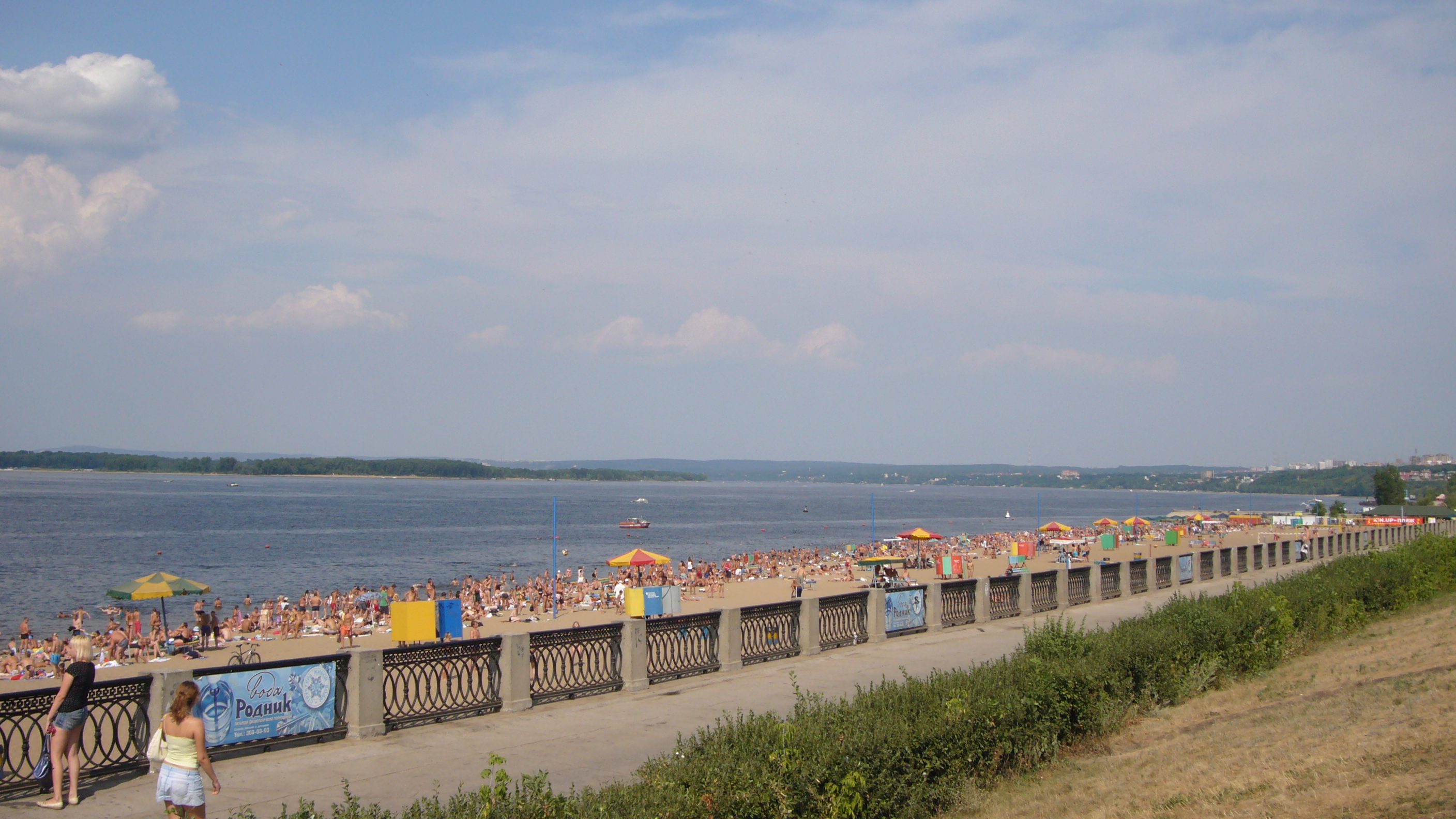
The Volga River in Samara

In January 1991, the historical name of Samara was given back to the city. Samara is one of the major industrial cities of Russia and has a multiethnic population. The city retains its leading positions in the region, mainly due to a number of oil and petrochemical enterprises. In September 2016, Samara was awarded the title "City of Labor and Combat Glory".

In 2018, Samara became one of the host cities of the FIFA World Cup, the matches of which were held at the Samara Arena stadium.

On July 2, 2020, the title "City of Labor Valor" was awarded to Samara. On December 10, 2021, the Memorial Complex was installed on the Alley of Labor Glory on the Young Pioneers Avenue. The central element of the memorial complex was a glass and metal stele about 26 meters high.

== Geography ==
=== Urban layout ===
The development of the territory of modern Samara began in the 16th century with the foundation of the Samara fortress. Prior to the founding of the fortress, this area was home to piers for Volga ships. The official date of foundation of the settlement was the decree of Tsar Fyodor Ioannovich of 1586. The location of the town was predetermined by several factors: strategic placement in order to ensure security from the raids of nomadic tribes; expansion of the Russian state in the Middle and Lower Volga regions; convenient location in the steppe landscape, at the intersection of the Volga and Samarka rivers.

The fortress was wooden with 11 towers, surrounded by a rampart and a moat, and occupied 5.2 hectares. Gradually, the population of the fortress increased, and the surrounding territories were developed. Simultaneously with the fortress in 1586, Boldyrskaya Sloboda arose on the Volga slope, and around 1645, upstream the Volga, Voznesenskaya Sloboda. During the 17th century, the settlements merged into a single whole.

In 1688, the settlement received the status of a city, which required the development of the first boundary plan. It is known that by the beginning of the 18th century the city stretched in a narrow strip along the Volga slope. From 1703 to 1706, a new earthen, diamond-shaped form was built to the east of the old fortress. The layout was unsystematic, with small blocks of bizarre shapes. Almost the entire territory was occupied by residential buildings and administrative, commercial and military buildings were concentrated only in the fortress. The territories along the banks of the Volga and Samarka were occupied by marinas and barns. By 1717, there were 210 philistine houses and 17 houses of yasak peasants in Samara. The settlement grew slowly due to its border position and by the end of the 18th century it occupied 61.2 hectares of territory, compactly stretching along the banks of the Volga.

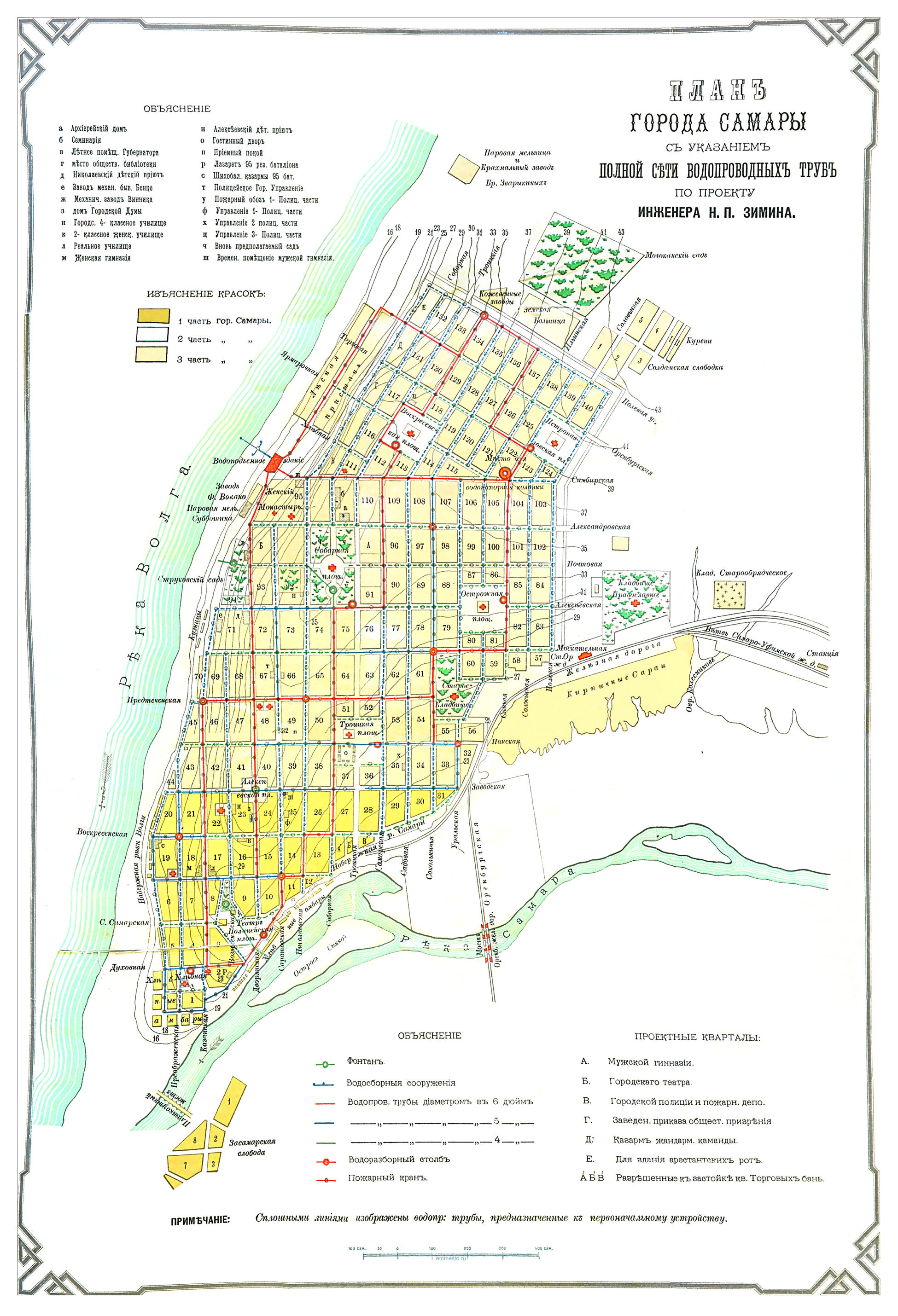
Samara city plan in 1886

In 1763, Empress Catherine II signed an order "On the making of all cities, their buildings and streets of special plans for each province especially." In the 70s, extensive activities were launched by the “Commission on the Stone Buildings of St. Petersburg and Moscow” to rebuild provincial cities. At the same time, the development of the first master plan for Samara began. In 1764, the settlement changed its administrative status, becoming a settlement. In 1780 it again received the status of a county town. In 1765 and 1772 it was badly damaged by fires. Despite these obstacles, in 1782 Samara received the first master plan with a rectangular grid of streets. According to the plan, the territory of the city was subject to a complete redevelopment: all buildings were liquidated, with the exception of several churches, houses and a fortress. In 1796, a second reconstruction plan was drawn up, identical to the first. As a result of its implementation, by 1804 the territory of Samara had increased to 70.4 hectares. The basis for the planning of the northern part of the city was a rectangular quarter measuring 130 × 260 m. The southern part of the settlement retained its irregular character. The main type of building of this period is a low-rise estate. The directions of the streets were determined by the direction of the channel, the so-called Samara break. The city was divided into functional zones: residential areas with trade facilities, administrative and religious buildings. Community centers were located around churches and at the ship's pier. Forges were located on the outskirts of the city. The fortress occupied 3.6 hectares, divided into a residential zone, an administrative zone (offices, a prison, a storehouse), a public one (a court, a thought), a commercial, an industrial one (warehouses, piers, forges, barns). In 1804, a new plan for the reconstruction and expansion of Samara was drawn up, following the model of the previous ones. The old buildings in the south of the city were demolished, and a regular layout appeared in its place. In 1839, the plan was almost completely implemented. The territory of Samara has increased by 3.5 times (246.4 ha). The city occupied the entire territory along the watershed of the Volga and Samara rivers, the banks of which were built up with marinas, grain barns, warehouses, and small-scale industries. The Samara fortress was still preserved, but had already lost its significance.

In 1840, a new development plan was approved, according to which the territory of the city expanded further along the watershed, while maintaining the planning structure. The new plan reflected the nature of the prevailing wooden buildings (stone houses accounted for only 10% of the total). The size of the quarters remained the same, the city grew at the expense of adjacent agricultural land. As a major trading center, with a railroad, Samara in 1851 received the status of a provincial city. The general plan of 1853 regulated only building within the city limits, however, the settlement began to grow chaotically, numerous industrial facilities appeared: tanneries, oil mills, brick factories and mills. The development of navigation along the Volga led to the fact that piers, warehouses, sawmills and other factories occupied the entire Volga coast of the city. From 1875 to 1877, a private railway to Orenburg was built through Samara, laid along the banks of the Samara River. The residential part of the city was cut off from the banks of the industrial rivers, with the exception of a small section of the Strukovsky Garden, overlooking the Volga. By the end of the 19th century, Samara was a single planning space with a regular plan (with the exception of the Zasamarskaya settlement, which arose no later than the end of the 18th century).

==== 1937 General plan – Greater Kuybyshev ====
The rapid growth of Kuybyshev required the development of a new master plan "Big Kuibyshev" in 1937, which was designed for the future, until 1956. It provided for a significant expansion of the city, turning it into a major industrial center. The main compositional axes arose along the watershed of the Volga and Samara rivers, and the second axis - Novo-Sadovaya Street. The structure highlights the main urban centers: Samara Square and the area of the Botanical Garden. The existing historical buildings were renovated and redeveloped, old cemeteries and churches were demolished to accommodate new public and cultural facilities. The outbreak of the Great Patriotic War prevented the full implementation of the plan. In the 1940s, large defense factories were evacuated to Kuibyshev, in connection with which the area of the city during the war and the first post-war years increased by 50%, amounting to 6651.3 hectares by the end of the 40s. Factories and factories were located along the railway, east of the old city, in empty areas. Between them and the old city, new residential areas arose. New construction also unfolded in other immediate outskirts and further in the periphery.

In 1949, a new general plan of Samara was adopted, according to which the transport system developed (the emergence of new highways), a new industrial and residential area of Bezymyanka was built, new territories were developed, new planning units appeared: microdistricts. The development of the city proceeded at an intensive pace: the Kirovsky district, the village of Kryazh, the mouth of the Dry Samarka were built up. Landscaping work was underway, the reconstruction of squares (Kuibyshev and Chapaev squares), the laying of the TsPKiO. A new urban framework was formed by community centers and main highways connecting remote areas with the historical center. However, until the end of the 1950s, the city was a conglomeration of scattered workers' settlements, located around the largest industrial enterprises. In such a system, two centers were key: the Old City (historical merchant) and the new Bezymyanka industrial district (social city). Bezymyanka was connected with the Old Town by a railway line and bus routes. This two-part structure of the city lasted until the end of the 20th century. In the 1950s, during the construction process, the local architectural school was able to form outstanding architectural ensembles that connected the workers' settlements into a single urban system. These are the buildings of Revolution Square, Kuibyshev, Samarskaya, Chapaev, Agriculture, Kirov, Pobeda Street, Kirov, Metallurgists, Yunykh Pioneers, Kuibyshev, Novo-Sadovaya, Maslennikov, the Soviet Army and the Volga embankment.

=== Climate ===
Samara experiences a humid continental climate (Köppen climate classification Dfb, borders on Dfa). Samara's humidity levels are higher in the summer than many Russian cities thanks to the precipitation levels and the close proximity to the Volga. The humidity levels usually range from 29% to 98% humidity over the period of a year. There was a record high of +40.4 °C (104.7 °F) during a severe heat wave. Being far inland, summers are very warm and winters very cold for its latitude among European cities.

Climate data for Samara (1991–2020, extremes 1852–present)
Month	Jan	Feb	Mar	Apr	May	Jun	Jul	Aug	Sep	Oct	Nov	Dec	Year
Record high °C (°F)	5.2 (41.4)	6.8 (44.2)	18.6 (65.5)	31.1 (88.0)	35.9 (96.6)	38.4 (101.1)	39.4 (102.9)	40.4 (104.7)	34.0 (93.2)	26.0 (78.8)	14.7 (58.5)	7.3 (45.1)	40.4 (104.7)
Mean daily maximum °C (°F)	−6.7 (19.9)	−5.8 (21.6)	0.9 (33.6)	12.4 (54.3)	21.4 (70.5)	25.3 (77.5)	27.3 (81.1)	25.5 (77.9)	19.0 (66.2)	10.3 (50.5)	0.7 (33.3)	−5.2 (22.6)	10.4 (50.7)
Daily mean °C (°F)	−9.6 (14.7)	−9.3 (15.3)	−2.9 (26.8)	7.5 (45.5)	15.6 (60.1)	19.8 (67.6)	21.9 (71.4)	19.9 (67.8)	13.8 (56.8)	6.5 (43.7)	−1.7 (28.9)	−7.8 (18.0)	6.1 (43.0)
Mean daily minimum °C (°F)	−12.3 (9.9)	−12.5 (9.5)	−6.2 (20.8)	3.2 (37.8)	10.3 (50.5)	14.7 (58.5)	16.8 (62.2)	15.0 (59.0)	9.6 (49.3)	3.5 (38.3)	−3.8 (25.2)	−10.2 (13.6)	2.3 (36.1)
Record low °C (°F)	−44.0 (−47.2)	−36.9 (−34.4)	−36.1 (−33.0)	−20.9 (−5.6)	−4.9 (23.2)	−0.4 (31.3)	6.0 (42.8)	4.1 (39.4)	−3.4 (25.9)	−15.7 (3.7)	−28.1 (−18.6)	−41.3 (−42.3)	−44.0 (−47.2)
Average precipitation mm (inches)	56 (2.2)	44 (1.7)	42 (1.7)	40 (1.6)	38 (1.5)	48 (1.9)	47 (1.9)	41 (1.6)	46 (1.8)	49 (1.9)	46 (1.8)	52 (2.0)	549 (21.6)
Average extreme snow depth cm (inches)	37 (15)	54 (21)	50 (20)	7 (2.8)	0 (0)	0 (0)	0 (0)	0 (0)	0 (0)	0 (0)	5 (2.0)	19 (7.5)	54 (21)
Average rainy days	4	3	5	11	14	15	14	12	14	14	10	6	122
Average snowy days	24	20	14	4	1	0.1	0	0	0.3	4	15	22	104
Average relative humidity (%)	83	80	79	67	58	64	67	69	73	76	83	83	74
Mean monthly sunshine hours	64	102	149	214	305	303	310	275	190	108	47	46	2,113
Source 1: Pogoda.ru.net
Source 2: NOAA (sun, 1961–1990)

== Governance ==
Samara is the administrative center of the oblast and, within the framework of administrative divisions, it also serves as the administrative center of Volzhsky District, even though it is not a part of it. As an administrative division, it is, together with two rural localities, incorporated separately as the city of oblast significance of Samara—an administrative unit with the status equal to that of the districts. As a municipal division, the city of oblast significance of Samara is incorporated as Samara Urban Okrug. In April 2015, Samara's nine city districts were granted municipal status.

The Duma of Samara Urban Okrug (Russian: Дума городского округа Самара, romanized: Duma gorodskogo okruga Samara) is the unicameral city duma of Samara. The Samara City Duma was founded in 1870 following administrative reforms that year. A total of 37 deputies are elected for five-year terms. Since 2015, deputies are elected in a two-tier system: district deputies are elected, who then elect representatives to the duma. In a 2019 law, the number of representatives was reduced from 41 to 37 while maintaining the two-tier system. In 2020, 210 district deputies were elected, who then elected 37 representatives to the duma, as follows:

Party	Seats
United Russia	29
Communist Party of the Russian Federation	3
A Just Russia	2
Liberal Democratic Party of Russia	2
Rodina	1

== Demographics ==
Historical population
Year	Pop.	±%
1897	90,000	—
1926	171,818	+90.9%
1939	390,488	+127.3%
1959	806,356	+106.5%
1970	1,044,849	+29.6%
1979	1,216,233	+16.4%
1989	1,254,460	+3.1%
2002	1,157,880	−7.7%
2010	1,164,685	+0.6%
2021	1,173,299	+0.7%
Source: Census data

The population of Samara was 1,173,393 in 2021, up from 1,164,685 in 2010.

In the 2021 Census, the following ethnic groups were listed:

Ethnic group	Population	Percentage
Russians	979,103	91.8%
Tatars	29,535	2.8%
Armenians	6,042	0.6%
Uzbeks	5,997	0.6%
Tajiks	5,631	0.5%
Others	40,262	3.8%

=== Religion ===
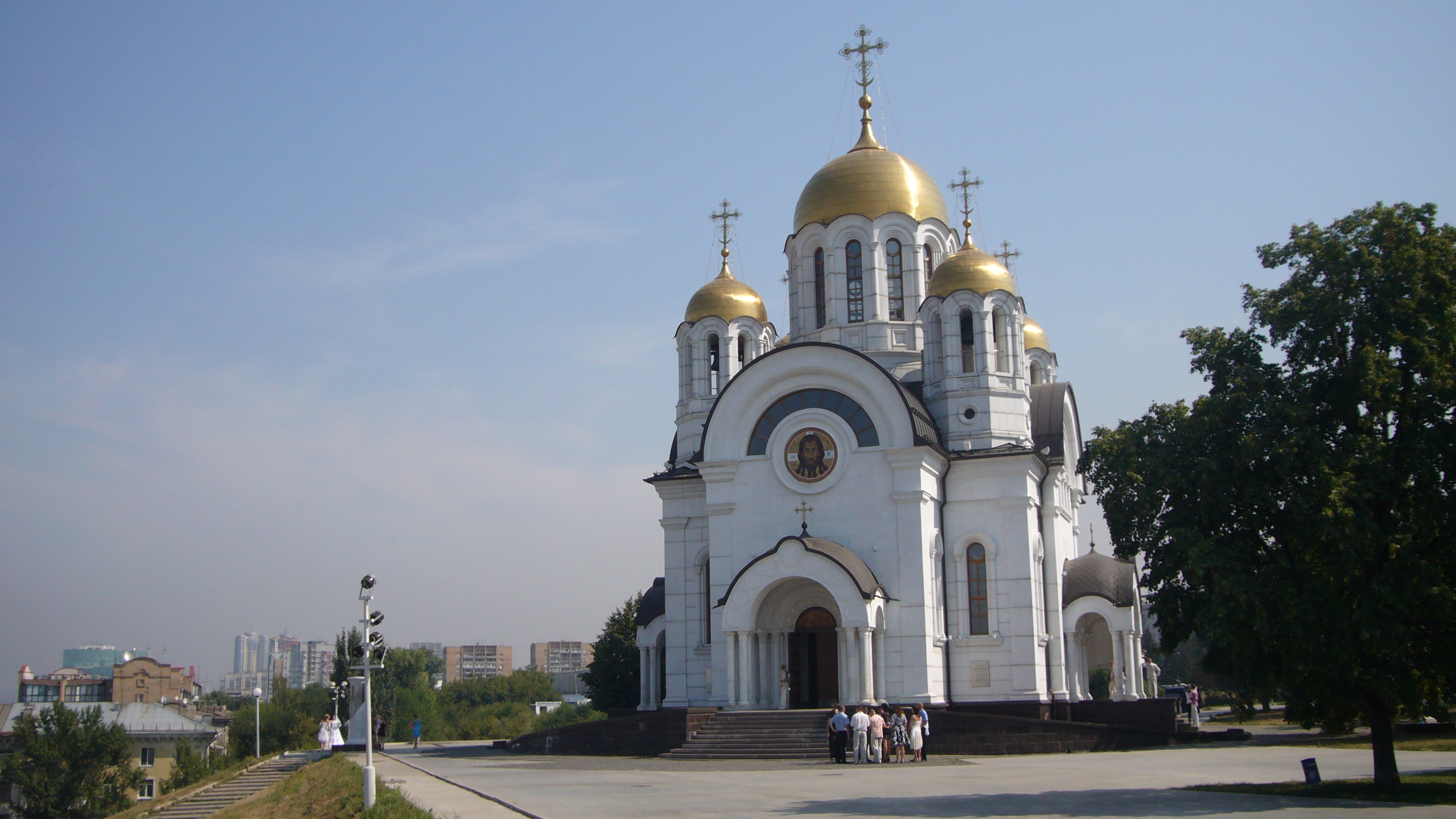
Church of St. George in Samara

Samara is a multi-confessional city with various religious groups, including an Orthodox Christian majority and minorities of Armenian Apostolic Christians, Catholics, Protestants, Muslims, and Jews.

== Economy ==
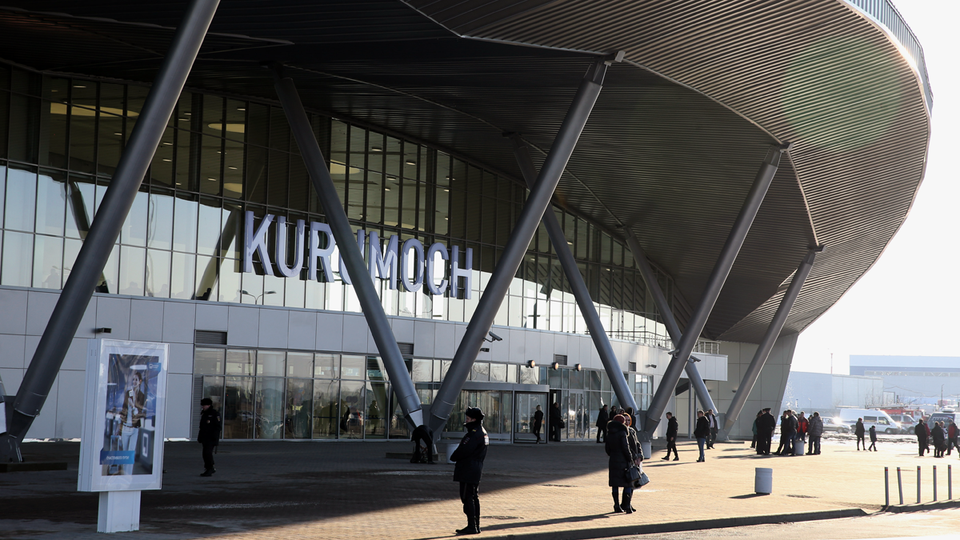
Kurumoch International Airport

Samara is a leading industrial center in the Volga region and is among the top ten Russian cities in terms of national income and industrial production volume. Samara is known for the production of aerospace launch vehicles, satellites and various space services (Progress State Research and Production Rocket Space Center), engines (Kuznetsov Design Bureau) and cables (Volgacable, Samara Cable Company), aircraft (Aviakor) and rolled aluminum, block-module power stations; refining, chemical and cryogenic products; gas-pumping units; bearings of different sizes, drilling bits; automated electrical equipment; airfield equipment (Start plant); truck-mounted cranes; construction materials; chocolates made by the Russia Chocolate Factory; Rodnik vodka; Vektor vodka; Zhiguli beer; food processing and light industrial products.

== Culture ==
Samara has an opera and ballet theater, a philharmonic orchestra hall, and five drama theaters. There is a museum of natural history and local history studies, a city art museum, and a number of movie theaters. As a dedication to the city's contribution to the development of aerospace industry, there is a space museum (called Cosmic Samara) and an exhibition of aerospace history in Samara State Aerospace University. In the 2000s, a large number of contemporary art galleries have also been built.

Samara Regional Museum of Local History named after Pyotr Vladimirovich Alabin is one of the oldest museums of the Volga region, founded on November 13, 1886. The museum offers 2,500 square meters of exposition and exhibition areas, a 270-seat cinema/lecture hall, and a library with a reading hall. Museum's funds contain around 230,000 items, including abundant archaeological and scientific collections (paleontological, mineralogical, zoological, botanical), and folklore and ethnographical collections. Visitors are offered a wide choice of expositions: paleoecological – "Natural communities of Samara region", archaeological – "Priceless heritage of the times gone by", ethnographic – "Circle of life, reflected in traditions and rituals of the Volga region indigenous peoples", historical – "The Crossroads of Samara history", and other exhibition projects.

=== Alabin Museum ===
The main branch of the Alabin Museum is the House-Museum of Vladimir Lenin in Samara is an object of cultural heritage of federal significance. It is located on the site of a former city merchant's mansion, dating to the last quarter of the 19th century. The Ulyanov family rented a second floor apartment of the house of Samara merchant Ilya Rytikov in 1893. During this time Vladimir Ulyanov graduated from St. Petersburg University law school and started employment at the Samara Regional Court. The museum opened in 1940. The museum's second floor houses a permanent memorial/household exhibition "Ulyanov family’s apartment in Samara, 1890–1893", recreating the living conditions and household atmosphere of the Ulyanov family. The ground floor contains a specialised display area, including a fragment of an artistic reconstruction of Ilya Rytikov's merchant shop.

Another branch of the museum is the Exposition Museum of Art Nouveau opened in 2012. It was the mansion of Alexandra Kurlina, a merchant's wife and philanthropist. The original façade and interior survive to this day, representing the works of European and Russian art nouveau masters. The museum is an exhibition space, which hosts major Russian museums’ projects (The Pushkin Museum, Abramtsevo Museum-Reserve, Moscow Multimedia Art Museum), and organises exhibitions of its own collections.

The final branch is the House-Museum of Mikhail Frunze which opened in 1934 but its building was constructed in 1891. On February 23, 2004, on the eve of the 70th anniversary of the museum, a new, third exposition was opened, in which new materials, previously classified as top secret, were exhibited. The exposition details information on the Russian Civil War, the confrontation on the Eastern Front between the armies of Mikhail Frunze and Alexander Kolchak, about "The Reds", "The Whites" and "The Greens", and about the anti-Soviet uprising behind the lines of the Eastern Front.

=== Public events ===
International festivals, scientific congresses and other social events are held on the territory of Samara. Among them are:

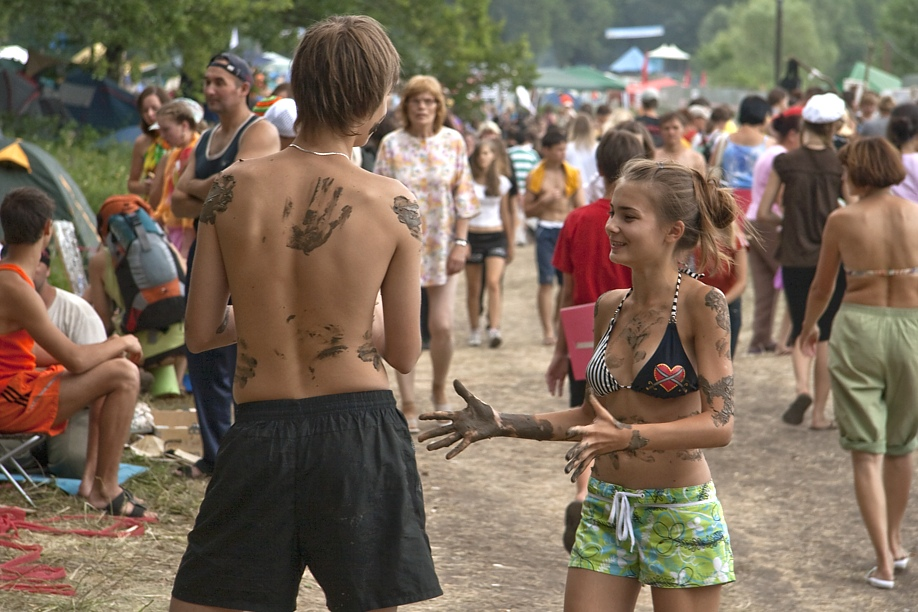
Grushinsky festival

- Grushinsky festival (Russian: Грушинский фестиваль) is an annual Russian bard song festival that was established in 1968. It takes place near the city of Samara, on the Mastryukovo lakes. The festival takes its name from Valeri Grushin, a singer-songwriter who died during a backcountry camping trip trying to save his drowning friends.
- Rock over Volga (Russian: Рок над Волгой) – an international rock festival, held annually from 2009 to 2013 and timed to Russia Day in Samara. The line-up included bands such as the Ken Hensley, Aquarium, Skunk Anansie, and Rammstein.
- Metafest (Russian: Метафест) – the annual multi-format music festival in the open air, held on the territory of Mastryukovo lakes since 2007. The line-up included bands such as the Ivan Smirnov, Olga Arefieva, Z-Star and Theodor Bastard.

=== Architecture ===
Architecture of Samara dates back to 15th and 16th centuries. The city had numerous wooden buildings with elaborate decor and more than 2000 cultural heritage objects. However, after the 1990s many unique ensembles were destroyed by a "concrete tsunami" of modern office and apartment blocks.

== Sport ==
Samara has clubs for several sports.

Club	Sport	Founded	Current league	League tier	Stadium
Krylia Sovetov	Football	1942	Russian Premier League	1st	Samara Arena
CSK VVS Samara	Ice hockey	1950	VHL	2nd	Kristall Ice Palace
Samara	Basketball	1976	Russian Basketball Super League 1	2nd	MTL Arena
Krylia Sovetov	Beach soccer	2010	Russian Beach Soccer Championships	1st	Volga Stadium
Dinamo-Samara	Futsal	2018	Russian Futsal Super League	1st	MTL Arena

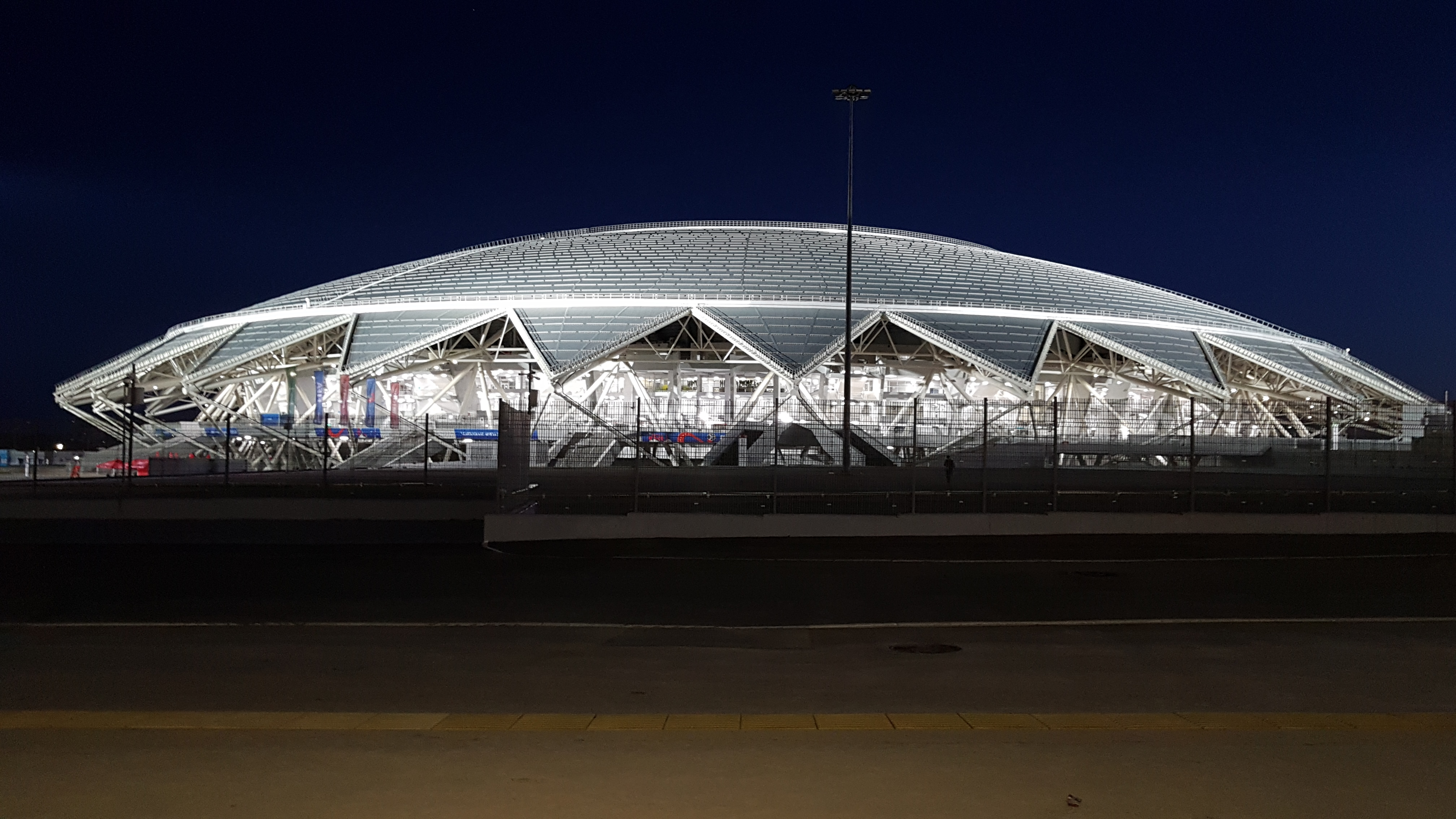
Cosmos Arena hosted 2018 FIFA World Cup games

Samara is a popular venue for national and international ice speedway, and the city won the Russian Ice Speedway Premier League in the 2012/13 season.

Samara is one of eleven cities that hosted the 2018 FIFA World Cup, with 6 matches (4 Group Stage matches, 1 Round of 16 match, 1 Quarter-Final) held in the newly built Cosmos Arena stadium, which has a seating capacity of 45,000. The city hosted the FIFA Fan Fest in Kuibysheva Square, with up to 20,000 fans participating at a time. Three new training fields were built in the city for the World Cup. Two major roads were repaired before the championship: the airport road and Moskovskoye Highway.

== Transport ==
Samara is a major transport hub. It is located on the M5 highway, a major road between Moscow and the Ural region. There are rail links to Moscow and other major Russian cities. The new, unusual-looking railway station building was completed in 2001. Samara has a major river port, due to its location at the confluence of the Volga and Samara rivers.

Kurumoch International Airport handles flights throughout Russia, Central Asia, China and the Middle East. There was once a Russian Air Force base east of the city at Bobrovka air base.

Public transportation includes the Samara Metro, trams, municipal and private bus lines, and trolleybuses. Local trains serve the suburbs. Samara Tram is an extensive light rail system covering most of Samara. First opened in 1915, it has 25 lines extending 168.2 kilometres (104.5 mi), served by 423 tram cars. Most of the trams are Tatra T3SU, modified Tatra T3E and 1 unique Tatra T3RF. Samara Metro is a single-line underground rapid transit system. Opened in 1987, the line has been expanded through 2015 and has 10 stations. An 11th station, "Teatralnaya", has been under construction since January 2022.

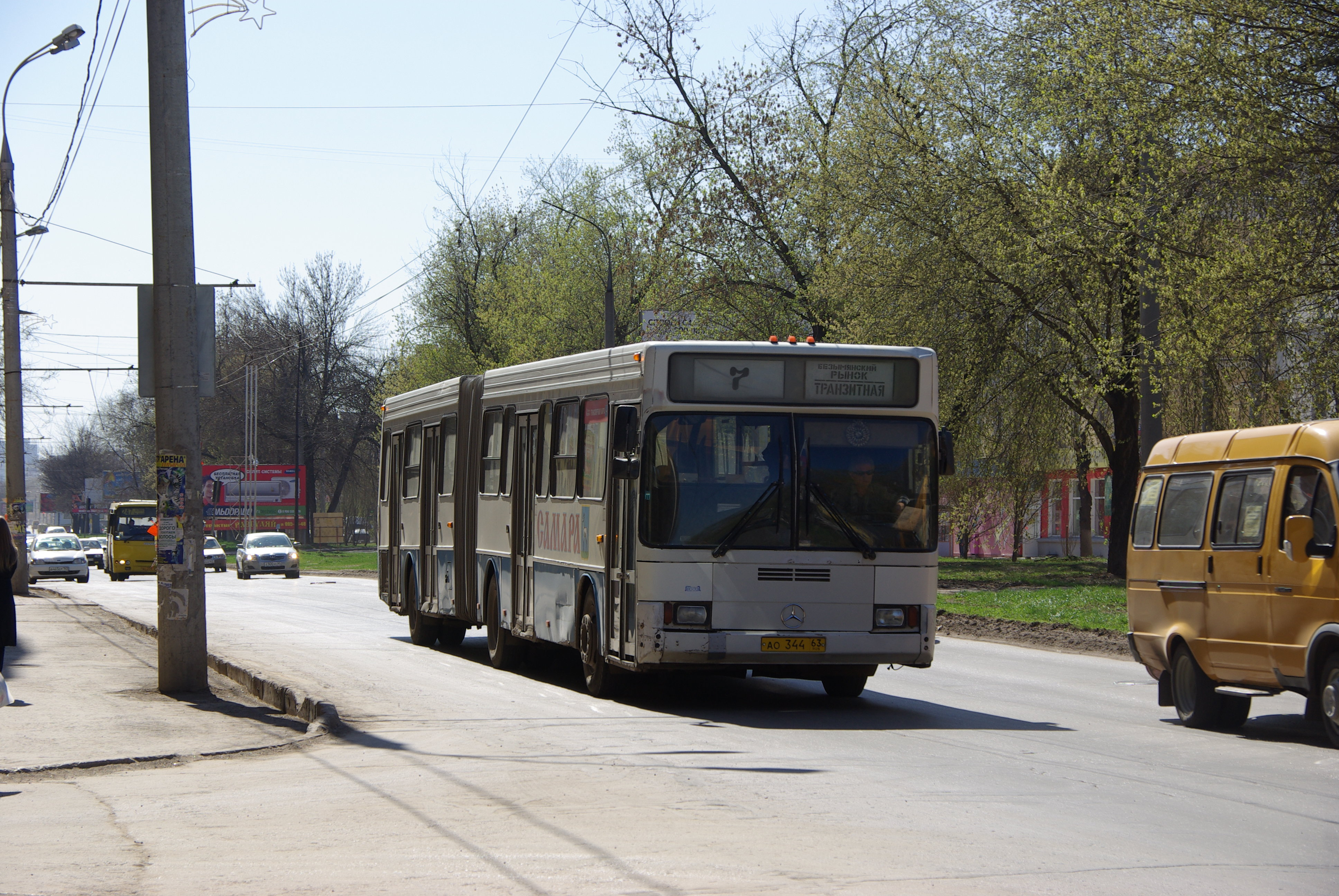
Golaz-AKA-6226 bus

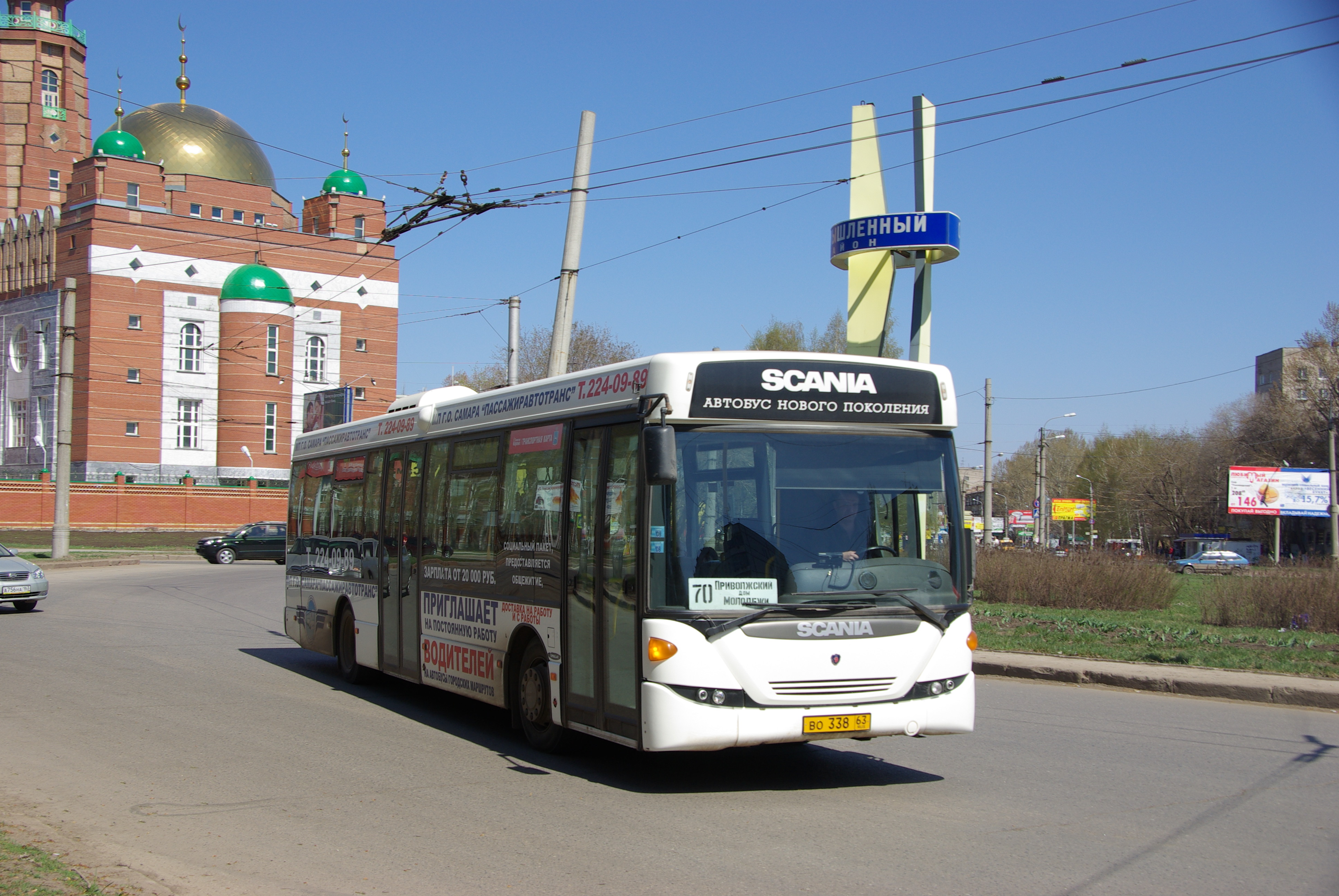
Scania OmniLink bus

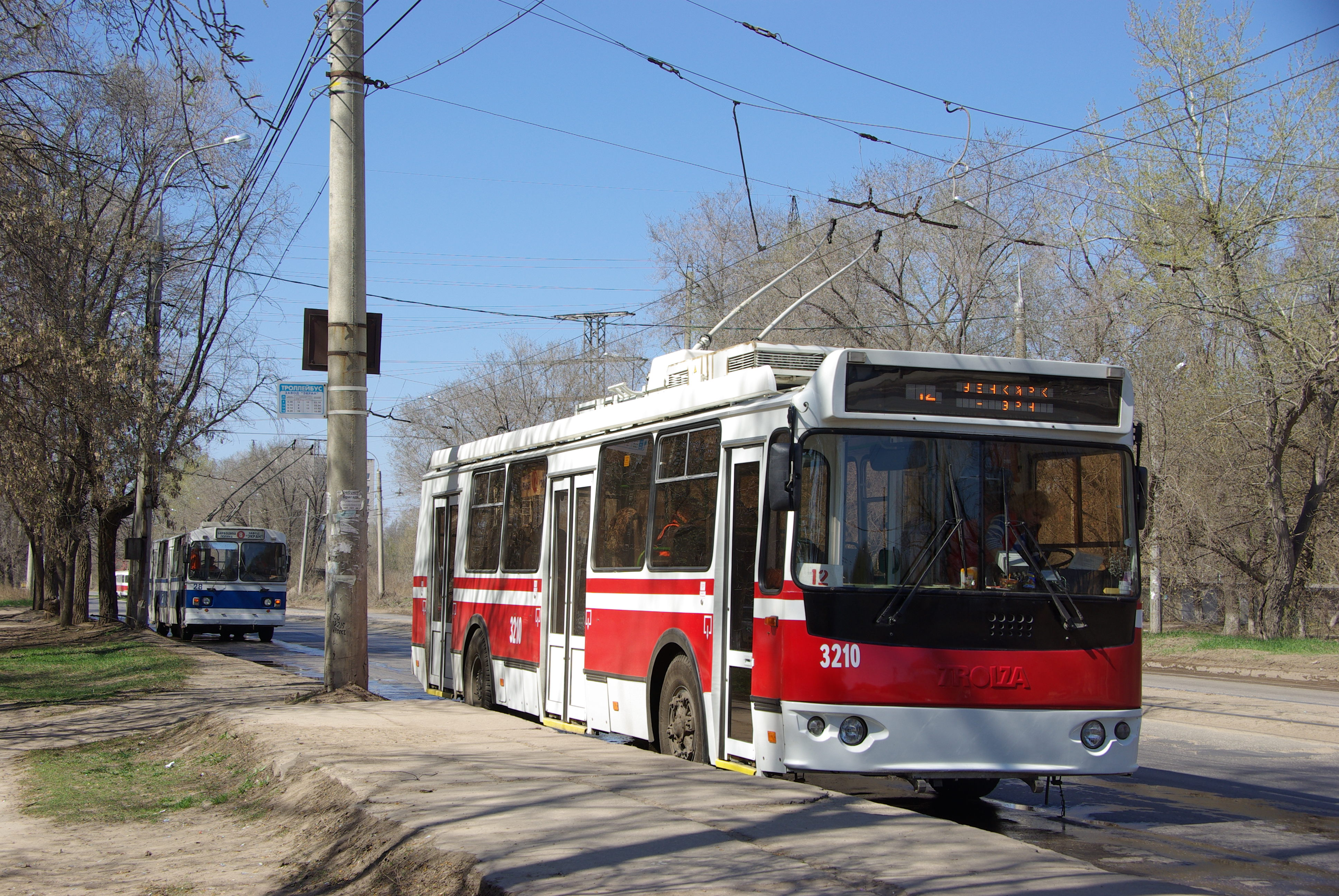
ZiU-682 trolleybus

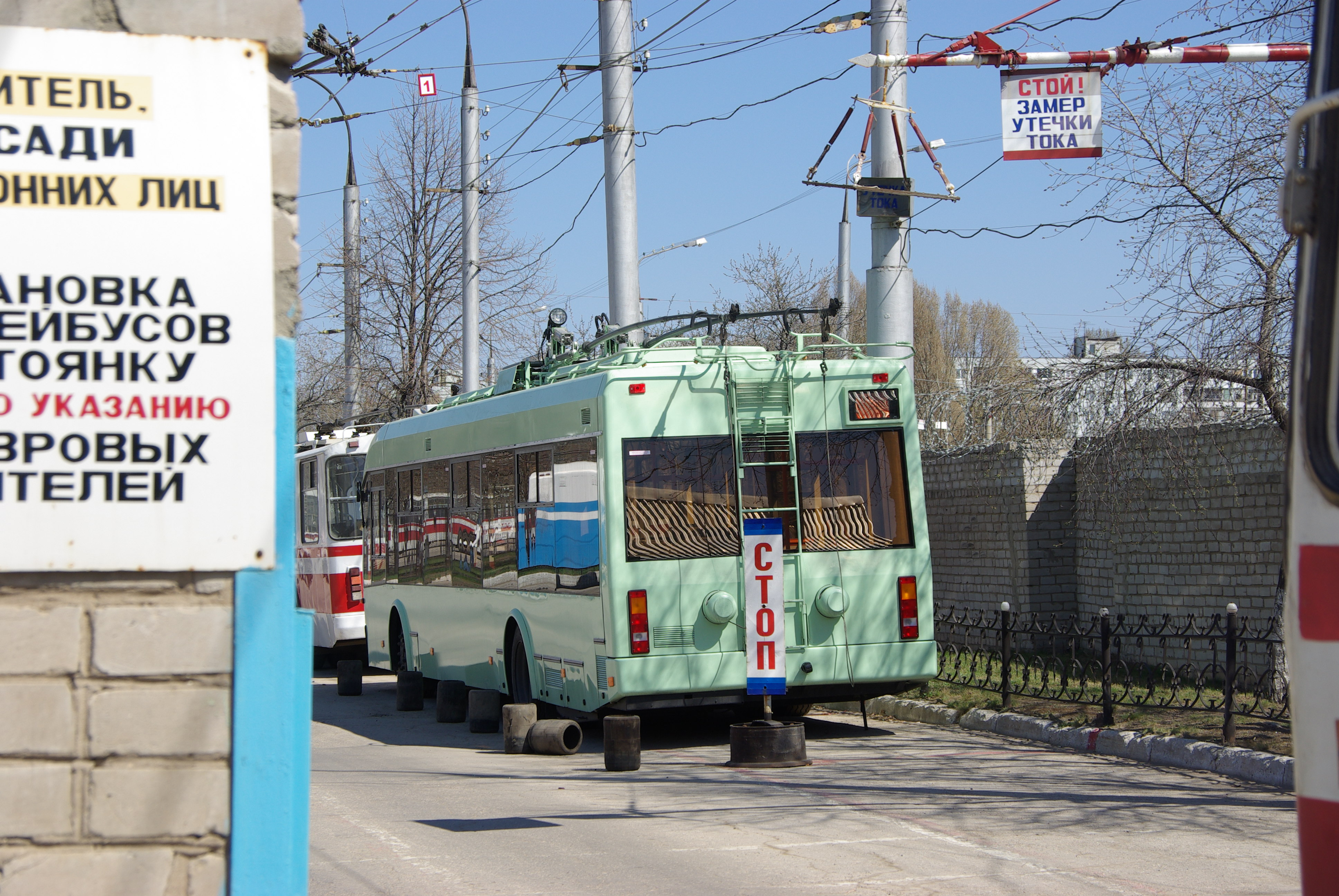
AKSM-321 low-floor trolleybus

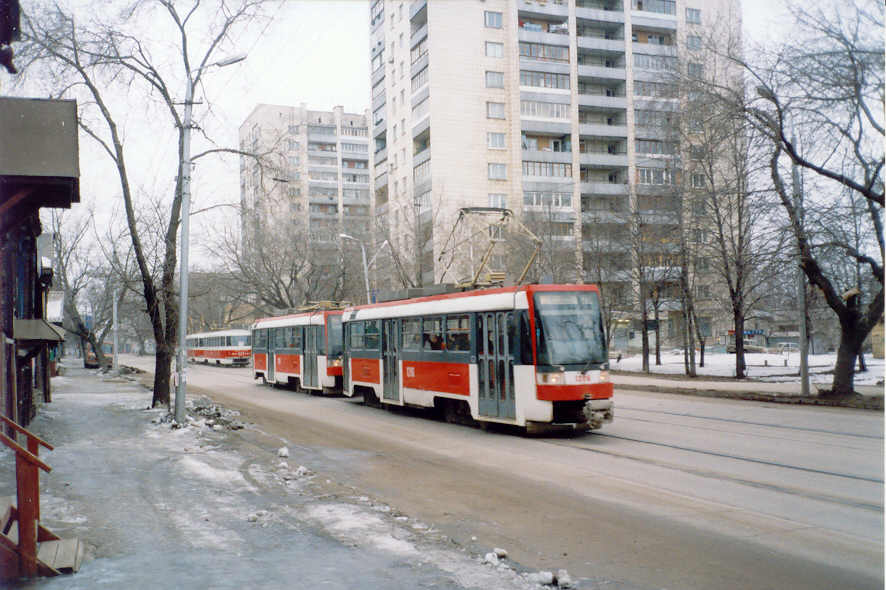
Tatra T3 tram

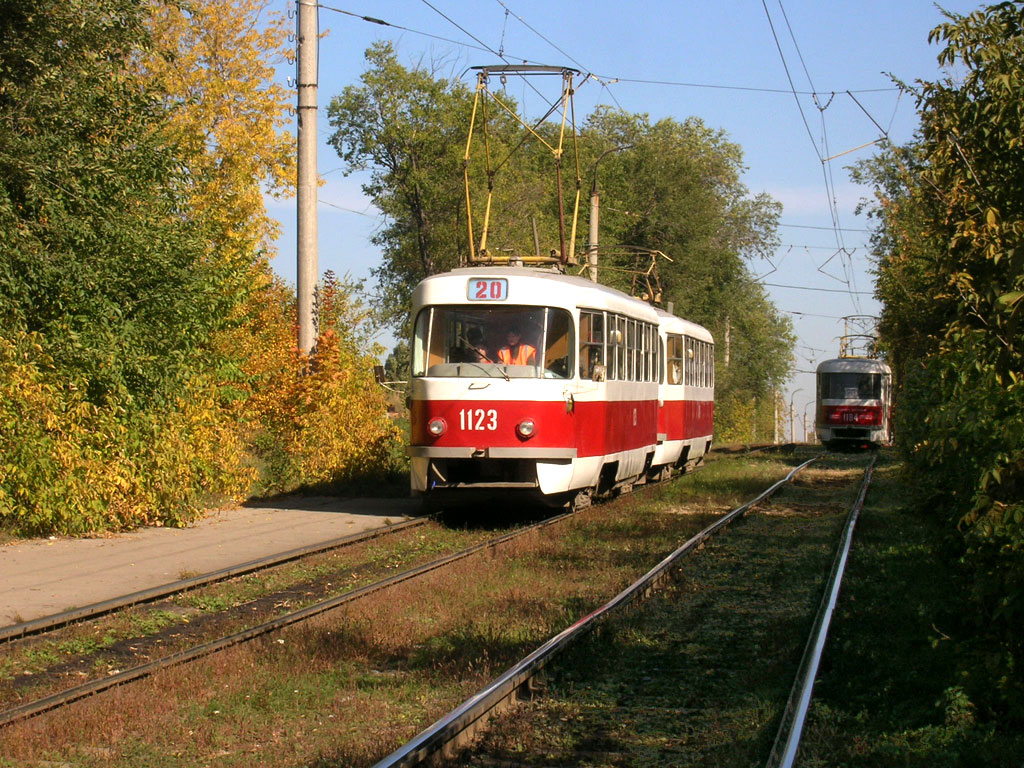
Tatra T3 trams

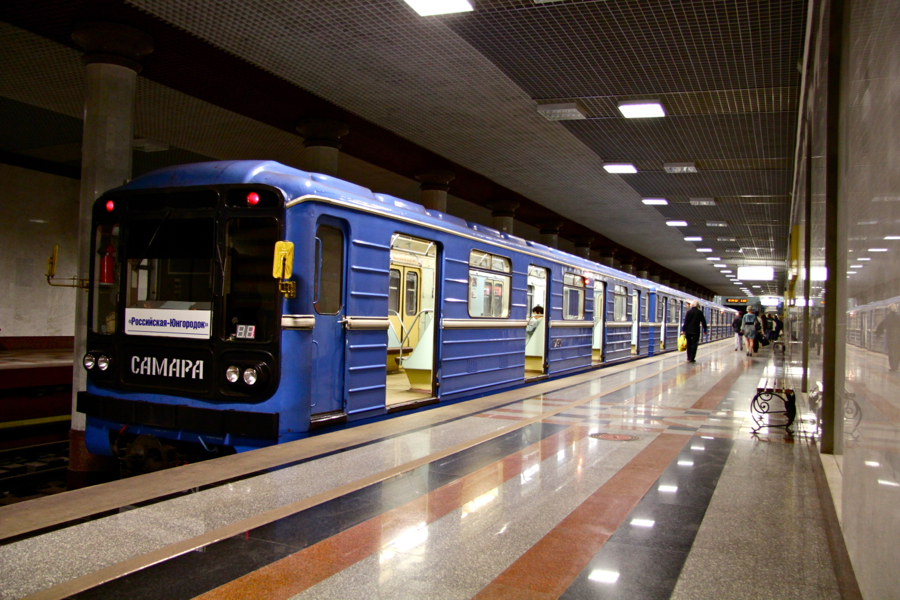
Samara Metro

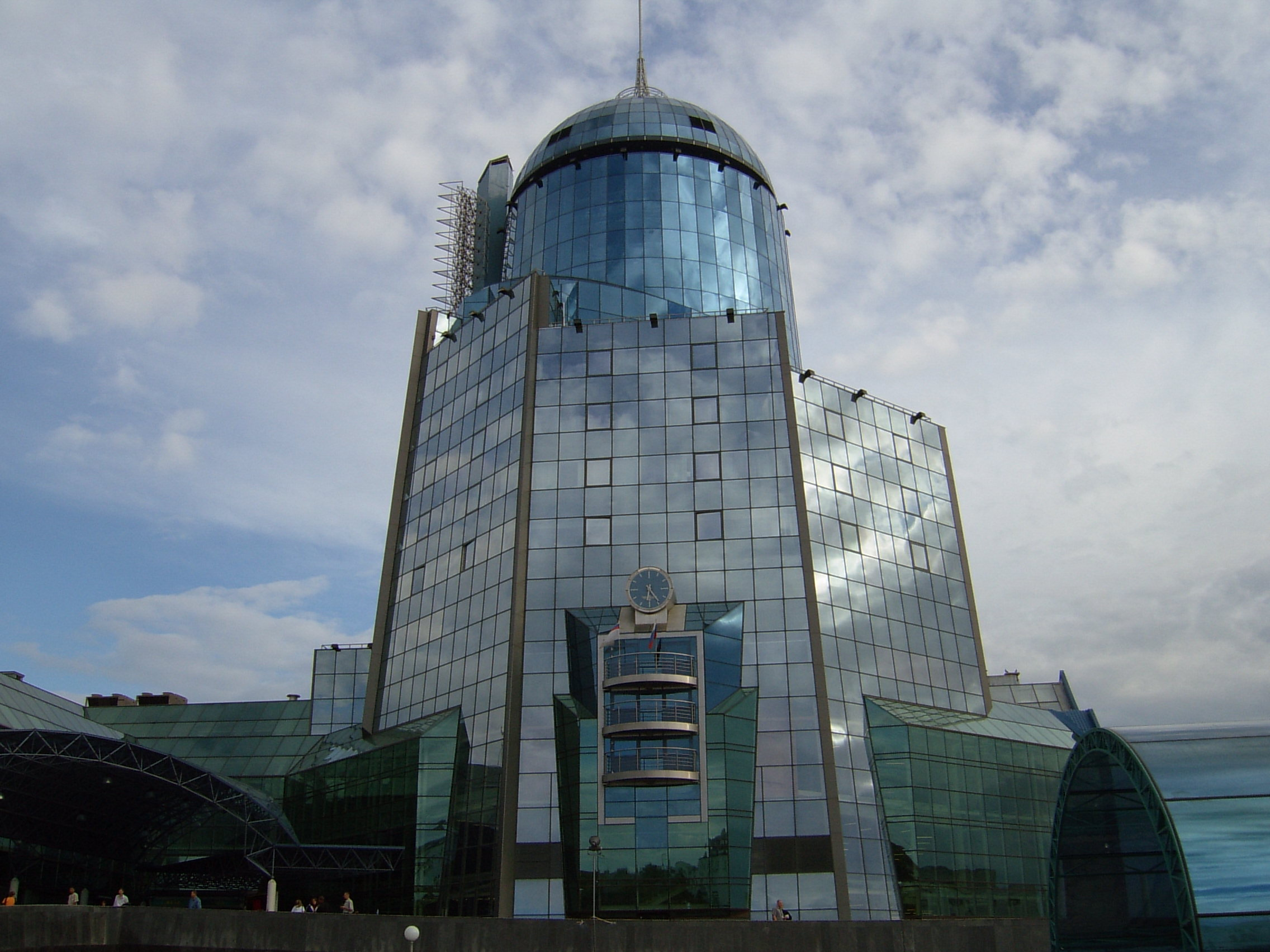
Samara railway station

Kurumoch International Airport

== Education ==
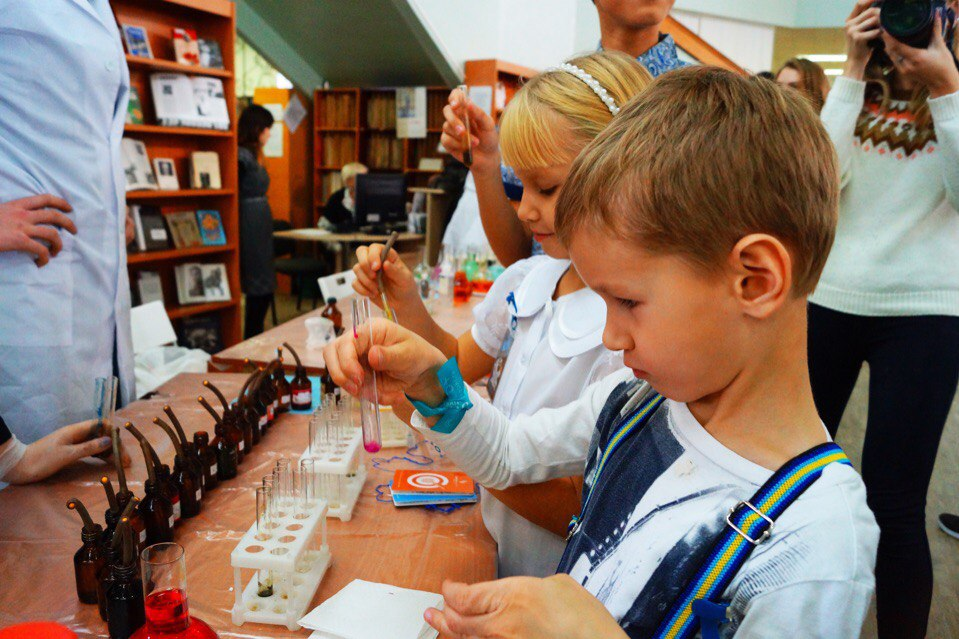
Festival of Science in Samara

Samara has 188 schools of general education, lyceums, high schools, and the college of continuous education (from primary up to higher education). Samara is a major educational and scientific centre of the Volga area. Twelve public and 13 commercial institutions of higher education as well as 26 colleges.

Samara is the home of Samara State Aerospace University (SSAU), one of Russia's leading engineering and technical institutions. SSAU faculty and graduates have played a significant role in Russia's space program since its conception. Samara is also the hometown of Samara State University, a very respected higher-education institution in European Russia with competitive programs in Law, Sociology, and English Philology. Scientific research is also carried out in Samara. The Samara Research Center of the Russian Academy of Sciences incorporates the Samara branch of the Physical Institute, Theoretical Engineering Institute and Image Processing Systems Institute. Major research institutions operate in the city. Samara State Technical University (SamGTU) was founded in 1914. There are 11 faculties with over 20,000 students (2009) and 1,800 faculty members. On campus, there are four dormitory and ten study buildings. Samara State Academy of Social Sciences and Humanities was founded in 1911 as Samara Teachers Institute. Currently, the academy offers 42 various specialisations in its 12 faculties.

== Honours ==
The asteroid 26922 Samara was named in honour of the city and the river on 1 June 2007.†

== Notable people ==
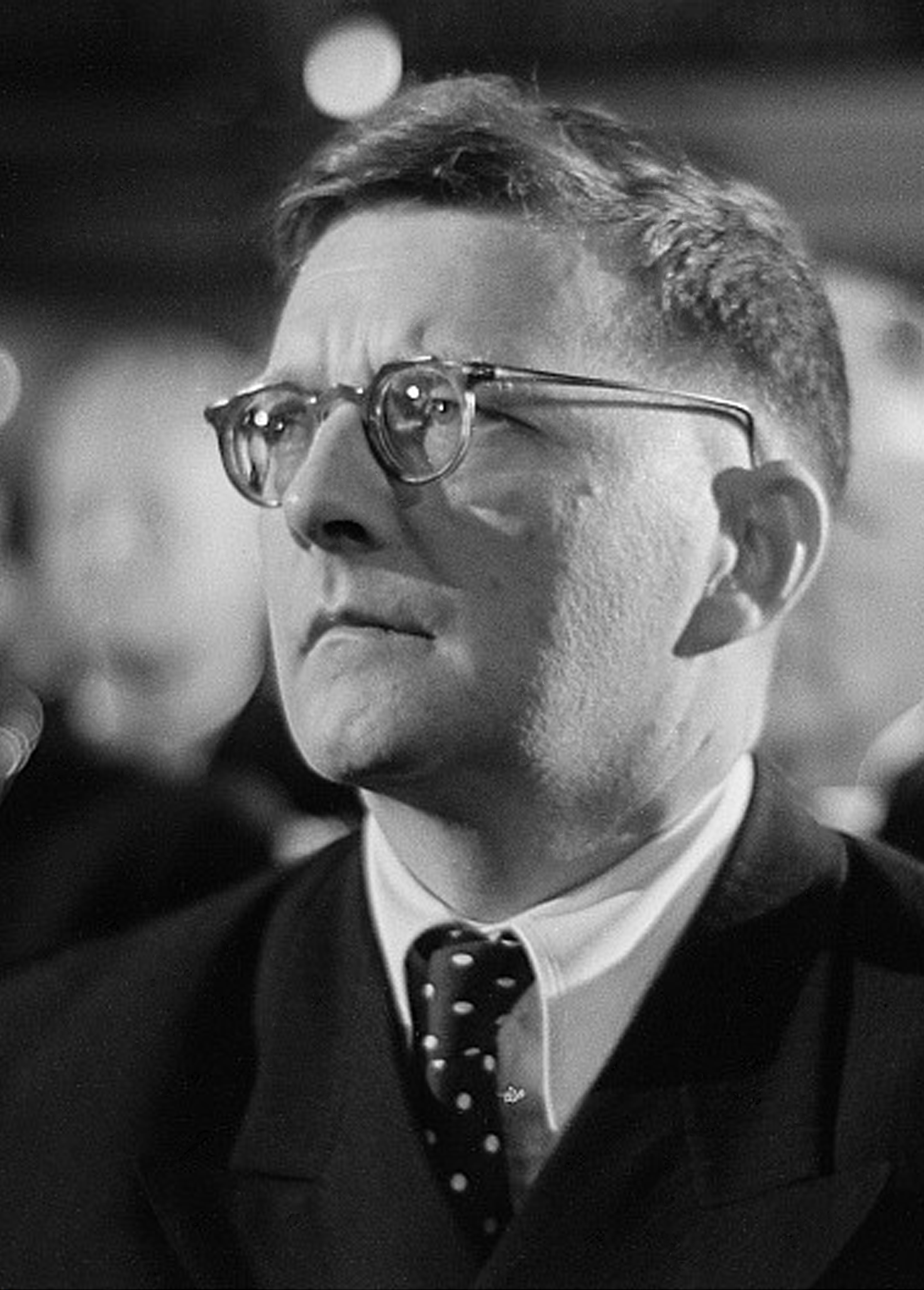
Dmitri Shostakovich, 1950

- Violetta Khrapina Bida (born 1994), Olympic épée fencer
- Mark Feygin (born 1971), lawyer and human rights activist
- Mimi Kagan (1918–1999), Russian-born American modern dancer, choreographer; born in Samara.
- Ilya Kan (1909–1978), chess player
- Boris Kuftin (1892–1953), archaeologist and ethnographer
- Maria Kuncewiczowa (1895–1989), Polish writer and novelist
- Dmitry Muratov (born 1961), journalist, 2021 Nobel Peace Prize winner
- Anastasia Pavlyuchenkova (born 1991), professional tennis player and multiple junior Grand Slam champion
- Enrico Rastelli (1896–1931), Italian performer and actor
- Gregory Ratoff (1893–1960), Russian-born American film director, actor and producer
- Pavel Romanov (1964–2014), sociologist and ethnographer
- David Rudman (1943– 2022), Russian-American wrestler, Sambo world champion, and judo European champion
- Sergei Alexander Schelkunoff (1897–1992), a mathematician and electromagnetism theorist, contributed to antenna theory
- Olga Sharkova-Sidorova (born 1968), foil fencer
- Dmitry Shostakovich (1906–1975), composer and pianist, lived in Samara during WWII where he finished his Symphony No. 7
- Pavel Sukhov (born 1988), epee fencer
- Aleksey Nikolayevich Tolstoy (1882–1945), writer of science fiction and historical novels.
- Dmitry Ustinov (1908–1984), Soviet Defence Minister, Marshal of the Soviet Union
- Svetlana Vanyo (born 1977), Russian-American swimmer and coach

== International relations ==
Samara is twinned with:

- Hefei, Anhui, China (2015)
- Heihe, Heilongjiang, China (2012)
- Krimml, Salzburg, Austria (2010)
- Palermo, Sicily, Italy (2008)
- Stara Zagora, Stara Zagora Province, Bulgaria (1992)
- Stuttgart, Baden-Württemberg, Germany (1992)
- St. Louis, Missouri, United States (1994)
- Tongyeong, Gyeongsangnam-do, South Korea (2016)
- Zhengzhou, Henan, China (2002)
- Denizli, Aegean Region, Turkey (2008)

== See also ==
- Sacred Heart Church, Samara
- Cathedral of Christ the Saviour (Samara)
- Monastery of the Theotokos of Iveron (Samara)
- Samara flag
- Samara culture
- Samara Police
