= Soyuz carrier rocket monument =

Coordinates: 53°12′45.6″N 50°8′42.3″E

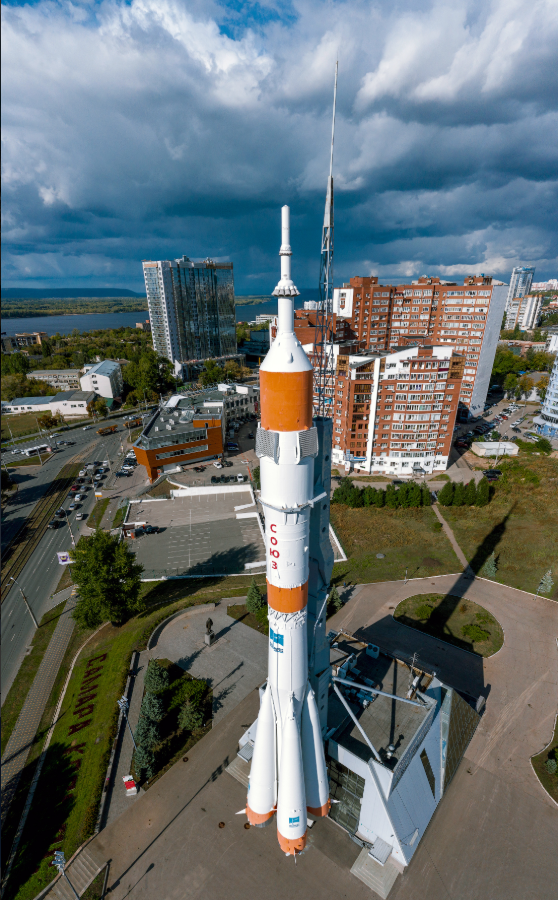
Soyuz carrier rocket monument and the Space museum building

The Soyuz carrier rocket monument (Russian: Монумент ракета-носитель «Союз») is a monument in Samara (formerly Kuybyshev), Russia dedicated to Samara rocket builders. It is located at the center of Samara on Lenina Avenue between Novo-Sadovaya and Chelyuskintsev Streets next to Rossiyskaya metro station. The opening ceremony took place on October 1, 2001, and was held in conjunction by the 50th anniversary of the First Manned Spaceflight performed by Yuri Gagarin.

== History ==
Governor of Samara Oblast Konstantin Titov, aerospace engineer, founder of the Progress State Research and Production Rocket Space Center Dmitri Ilyich Kozlov, members of Roscosmos and staff of Baikonur and Plesetsk Cosmodromes attended at the ceremony. The monument consists of the intact R-7 11A511 (Soyuz) which is fixed on the Space museum building. The rocket is 50 m height; mass is 20 tones. Facility which provides required support for the rocket weighs 53 tones. The rocket R-7 11A511 was built at the Kuybyshev Progress Rocket Space Centre in 1984. It was used for crew training at Plesetsk Cosmodrome. The rocket was ending one's lifespan in 1999 and then it was transferred to the production plant. The transfer was held in conjunction by the 40th anniversary of the plant. The space center dismantled equipment and exhibited the carrier rocket. The missile body was painted with white and orange colours.

The Space museum was opened on 12 April 2007. The museum building was designed by architects Zhukov and Checherin. The museum is occupied by the collections of rocket-and-space equipment samples. Also this exhibition include: Yantar 4K1 and Resurs F1 landing sections, rocket engine mockups.
