= Sacred Heart Church, Samara =

Coordinates: 53.1939°N 50.0961°E

Sacred Heart Church
- Храм Пресвятого Сердца Иисуса
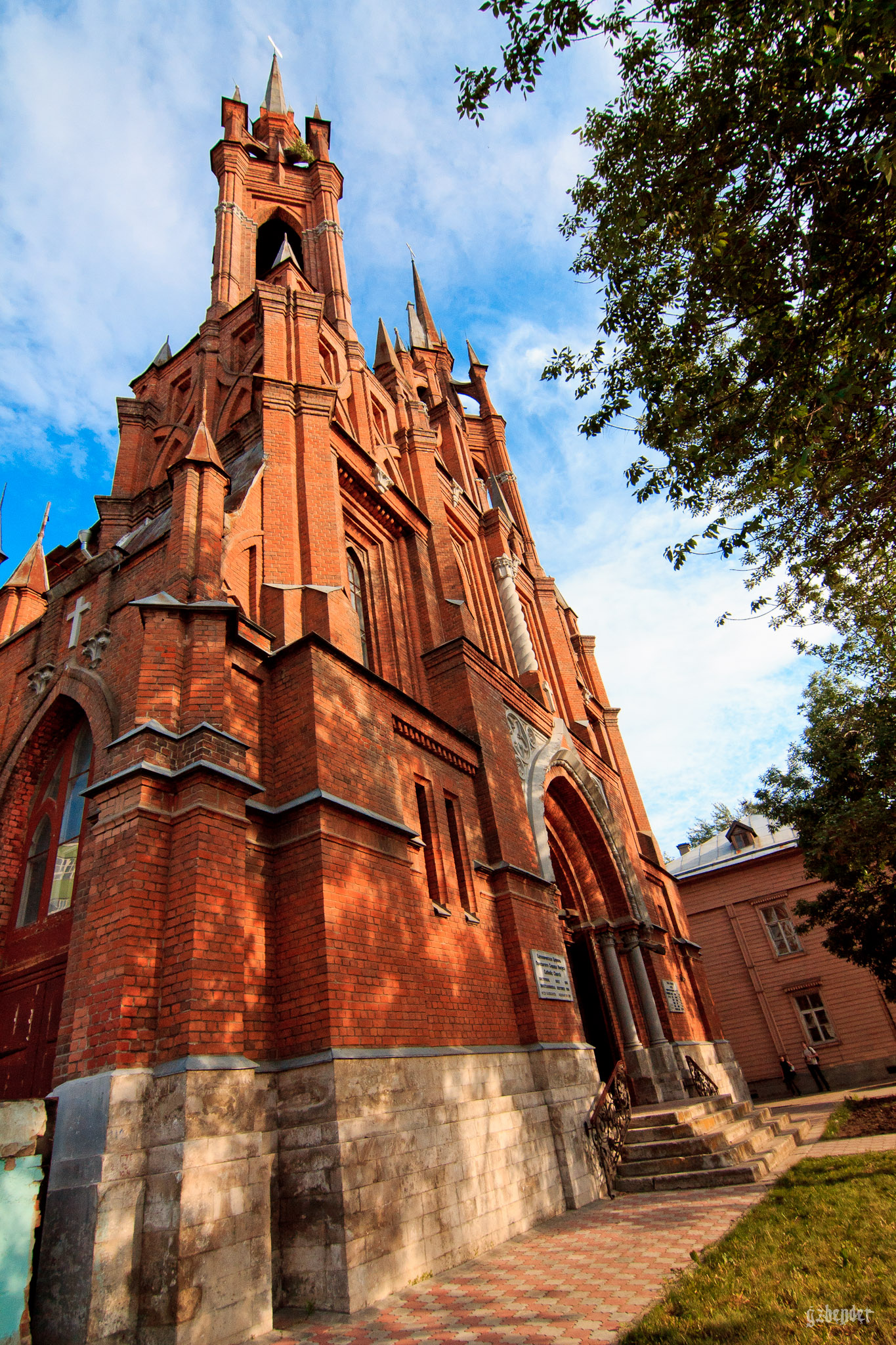
- Sacred Heart Church
- Location: Samara
- Country: Russia
- Denomination: Roman Catholic Church

The Sacred Heart Church (Russian: Храм Пресвятого Сердца Иисуса) is a Catholic church, of neogothic style located in the historic center of the city of Samara, Russia.

In 1902 it was decided to expand and build a church of red brick neo-Gothic style. At a cost of 80 thousand rubles, the project was entrusted to the Polish architect Bogdanovich (or Bohdanowicz), who built the Cathedral of the Immaculate Conception in Moscow. Under the patronage of the Sacred Heart of Jesus, it was consecrated in February 1906. Its two towers of 47 m in height made it for a long time the tallest building in the city.

The parish was disbanded by the Soviet authorities in the 1920s. Later, they closed the church, and it was vandalised. In 1941, a regional museum was installed there.

In 1991, the Catholic community regained the church for worship.

== See also ==
- Roman Catholicism in Russia
- Sacred Heart Church

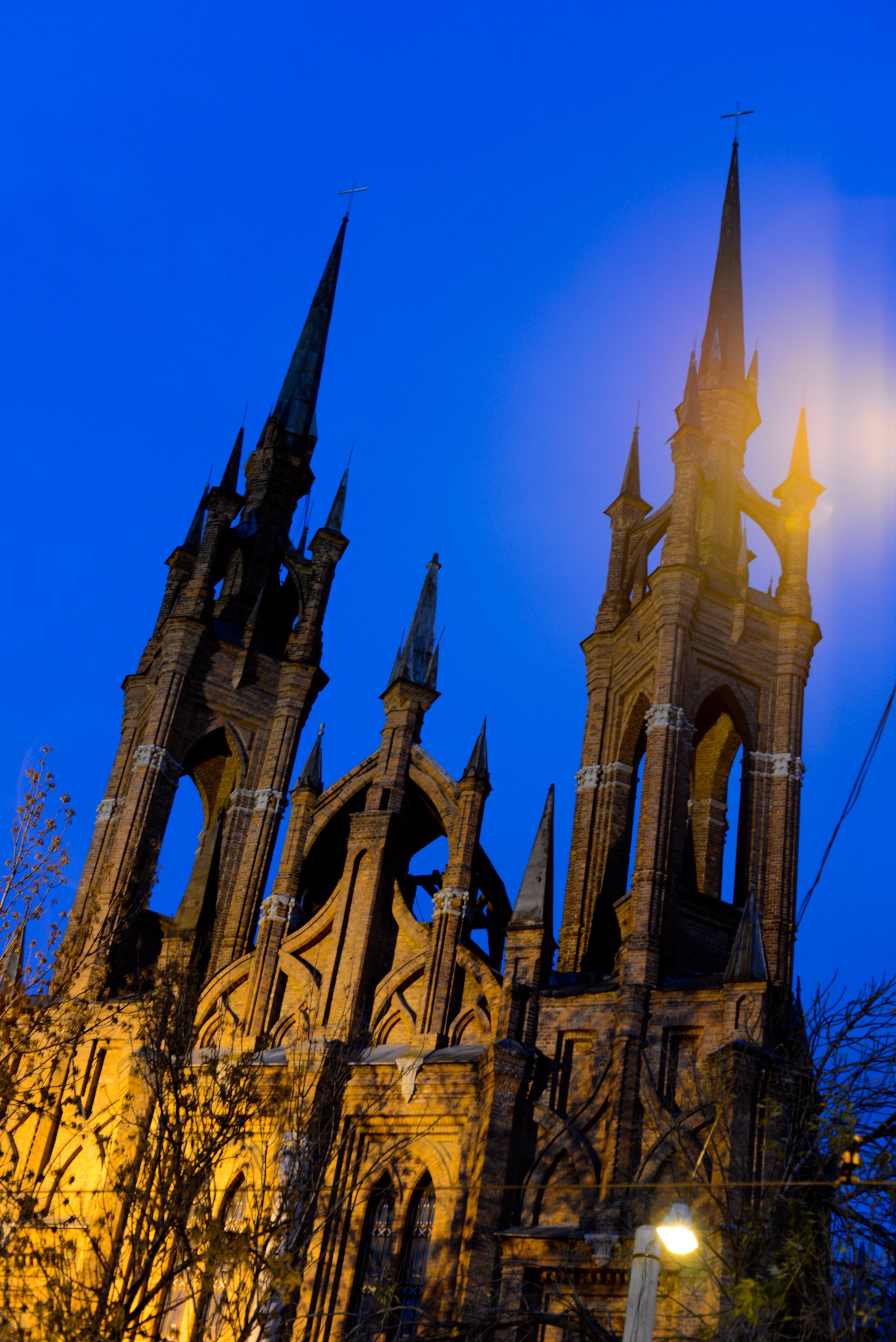
Another View
