= List of Samara Metro stations =

There are ten metro stations on the Samara Metro system in Samara, Russia.

Line 1 - Линия 1
Name	Russian	Notes
Alabinskaya	Алабинская	The newest station, opened in December 2014.
Rossiyskaya	Российская	The station opened in December 2002. It has side platform arrangement.
Moskovskaya	Московская	Opened in 2002. Another pillar-trispan station. The walls are made of red marble with yellowish accents. A pedestrian tunnel leading to a connecting station on a future branch line is planned.
Gagarinskaya	Гагаринская	Pillar-trispan station equipped with escalators. The design is reminiscent of space travel, the station being named in honour of the first-ever person to travel into space, Yuri Gagarin.
Sportivnaya	Спортивная	Pillar-trispan station with staircase. The station is decorated with pictures representing different kinds of sports, referring to the name of the station – Sportivnaya means "Sporty".
Sovetskaya	Советская	Pillar-trispan station with staircase. The design was kept simple for financial reasons. One of the exits has not been completed and is thus not used. The station name means "Soviet".
Pobeda	Победа	Vaulted station. A staircase at the end of the platform leads to the exit. The interior of the station recalls the victory of the USSR in the Second World War. The station features stained-glass windows named "Victory Salute". The name of the station means "Victory".
Bezymyanka	Безымянка	Pillar-trispan station. The platform can be reached by a broad staircase. Wall mosaics depict scenes from World War II. The literal translation of "Bezymyanka" is "Unnamed district". This name sounds strange in Russian too, but is connected with the history of one of newest district of Samara.
Kirovskaya	Кировская	This vaulted station was the first of the Samara metro to be equipped with escalators. It is the only station of the system with a surface ticket hall. The station is decorated with a red tuff high relief. The station is named in honour of the revolutionary Sergei Kirov.
Yungorodok	Юнгородок	The only surface station of the Samara metro. This station was absent in the original plans – instead, the line was to run to Krylya Sovetov. The decision to build a station at Yungorodok was taken for economic reasons and in order to speed up metro construction, the distance to Yungorodok station being shorter than to Krylya Sovetov. The station is situated on the territory of the Kirovskoe electrodepot. A literal translation of the station name is impossible, but an accurate equivalent could be "City of Youth".
