= Timeline of Samara =

The following is a timeline of the history of the city of Samara, Russia.

== Prior to 20th century ==
- 1586 - Fortress established.
- 1685 - Cathedral built.
- 1824 - September: Tsar Alexander I visits town.
- 1850
  - Samara government established.
  - Iversky Monastery founded.
- 1851 - Strukovsky Garden opens.
- 1871 - Vasily Bureya becomes mayor.
- 1881 - Zhigulevsky Brewery built.
- 1882 - Society of Doctors established.
- 1883 - Population: 63,479.
- 1894 - Cathedral of Christ the Savior (Samara) built.
- 1897 - Population: 91,672.

== 20th century ==
- 1913 - Population: 144,000.
- 1928 - City becomes part of the Middle Volga Oblast.
- 1932 - Botanical Garden State University established.
- 1935
  - Samara renamed "Kuybyshev" (after Valerian Kuybyshev).
  - Cathedral of Christ the Savior demolished.
- 1941 - National government relocated to Kuybyshev from Moscow.
- 1942 - Football Club Krylia Sovetov Samara formed.
- 1943 - National government relocated from Kuybyshev back to Moscow.
- 1957 - Metallurg Stadium opens.
- 1965 - Population: 948,000.
- 1985 - Population: 1,257,000.
- 1987 - Kuybyshev Metro begins operating; Kirovskaya (Samara Metro) and Yungorodok (Samara Metro) open.
- 1989 - Samara State University founded.
- 1991 - Konstantin Titov becomes governor of the Samara Oblast.
- 1992 - Sovetskaya (Samara Metro) opens.
- 1993
  - Samara State Medical University active.
  - Gagarinskaya (Samara Metro) and Sportivnaya (Samara Metro) open.
- 1997 - George Limansky becomes mayor.
- 1999 - Samara Mosque built.
- 2000 - City becomes part of the Volga Federal District.

== 21st century ==
- 2002 - Moskovskaya (Samara Metro) opens.
- 2007
  - Rossiyskaya (Samara Metro) opens.
  - Vladimir Artyakov becomes governor of the Samara Oblast.
- 2010 - Population: 1,164,896.
- 2015 - Alabinskaya (Samara Metro) opens.

== See also ==
- Samara history
- History of Samara
- List of mayors of Samara, Russia
- List of heads of the Samara, Russia region
- Other names of Samara e.g. Kuibyshev, Kuybyshev
- Timelines of other cities in the Volga Federal District of Russia: Kazan, Nizhny Novgorod

== Bibliography ==
- "Samara-Zlatoust Railway: Samara". Guide to the Great Siberian Railway. St. Petersburg: Ministry of Ways of Communication. 1900.
- "Samara (town)" . Encyclopædia Britannica. Vol. 24 (11th ed.). 1910. p. 108.
- "Samara", Russia, Leipzig: Karl Baedeker, 1914, OCLC 1328163
- William Henry Beable (1919), "Samara", Russian Gazetteer and Guide, London: Russian Outlook
