= Timeline of Kazan =

The following is a timeline of the history of the city of Kazan, Tatarstan, Russia.

== Prior to 20th century ==
- 1438 - Khanate of Kazan begins.
- 1486 - Kazan and the Russians sign a peace treaty.
- 1552 - Siege of Kazan; Russians in power.
- 1562 - Annunciation cathedral founded.
- 1579 - Bogoroditski convent built.
- 1708 - Kazan becomes the capital of the Kazan Governorate.
- 1742 - The peak of persecution of the Muslims of Kazan by the Russians.
- 1770 - Märcani Mosque built.
- 1774
  - July: Battle of Kazan (1774).
  - Fire.
- 1788 - Kazan Gunpowder Plant established near city.
- 1804 - University founded.
- 1815 - Fire.
- 1825 - Fire.
- 1849 - Nurulla Mosque built.
- 1875 - Horse tramway begins operating.
- 1881 - Population: 134,700.
- 1883 - Population: 140,726.
- 1890 - Äcem Mosque built.
- 1894 - Moscow-Kazan Railway begins operating.
- 1895 - Kazan Art School founded.
- 1896 - Railway station built.
- 1897 - Population: 131,508.
- 1900 - Population: 143,707.

== 20th century ==
- 1913 - Population: 195,300.
- 1917
  - 14 August: 1917 Kazan Gunpowder Plant fire begins.
  - 12 December: Idel-Ural State declared.
- 1918
  - 5–7 August: Capture of Kazan by the White Army.
  - 5–10 September: Red Army Kazan Operation occurs.
- 1924 - Kazan Zoo founded.
- 1965 - Population: 762,000.
- 1973 - Vakhitovsky district formed.
- 1985 - Population: 1,047,000.
- 1986 - Kazan International Airport active.
- 1989 - Kazan celebrates the 1100th anniversary of the conversion of Islam in the region.
- 1990 - 8 August: Yeltsin gives speech ("as much sovereignty as you can swallow") in Kazan.
- 1991 - Kamil Iskhakov becomes mayor.
- 1992 - May: World Congress of Tatars meets in Kazan.
- 1998 - Madina Mosque built.
- 2000 - City becomes part of the Volga Federal District.

== 21st century ==
- 2005
  - Kazan Metro begins operating.
  - Millennium Bridge (Kazan) and Qolşärif Mosque open.
  - Medal "In Commemoration of the 1000th Anniversary of Kazan" created.
  - Ilsur Metshin becomes mayor.
- 2008 - 9 January: 2008 Kazan gas explosion.
- 2013
  - Kazan Arena opens.
  - 2013 Summer Universiade (athletic event) held in Kazan.
- 2021
- 11 May - Kazan school shooting

== See also ==
- History of Kazan
- Other names of Kazan
- Timelines of other cities in the Volga Federal District of Russia: Nizhny Novgorod, Samara

== Bibliography ==
- Abraham Rees (1819), "Kazan", The Cyclopaedia, London: Longman, Hurst, Rees, Orme & Brown, hdl:2027/uc2.ark:/13960/t7fr04x03 – via HathiTrust
- George Ripley; Charles A. Dana, eds. (1879). "Kazan". American Cyclopedia (2nd ed.). New York: D. Appleton and Company. hdl:2027/hvd.hn585r.
- "Kazan", Hand-book for Travellers in Russia, Poland, and Finland (4th ed.), London: J. Murray, 1888
- Kropotkin, Peter Alexeivitch; Bealby, John Thomas (1910). "Kazañ (town)" . Encyclopædia Britannica. Vol. 15 (11th ed.). p. 704.
- "Kazan", Russia, Leipzig: Karl Baedeker, 1914, OCLC 1328163
- William Henry Beable (1919), "Kazan", Russian Gazetteer and Guide, London: Russian Outlook
- C. Edmund Bosworth, ed. (2007). "Kazan". Historic Cities of the Islamic World. Leiden: Koninklijke Brill. ISBN 978-9004153882.
