= Kazan explosion =

Kazan explosion may refer to:

- 1917 Kazan Gunpowder Plant fire
- 2008 Kazan gas explosion
