= Bezymyanka =

Bezymyanka may refer to:

- Bezymyanka (airport)
- Bezymyanka - railway station in Samara, Russia
- Bezymyanka metro station, a station of the Samara Metro, Samara, Russia
- Bezymyanka (village), a village (khutor) in Volgograd Oblast, Russia
