= Kirovskaya (Samara Metro) =

Samara Metro Station

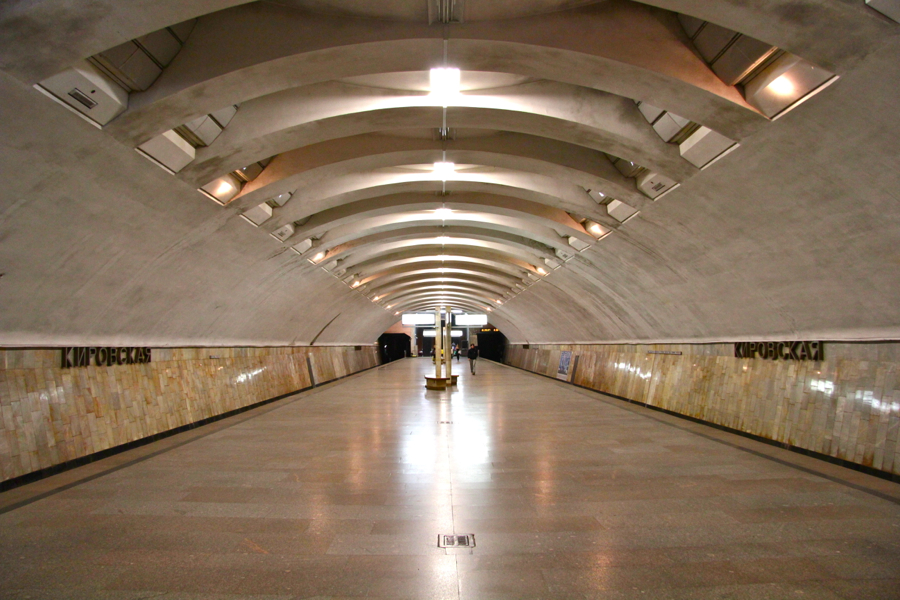

General information
- Location: Samara, Russia
- Coordinates: 53.211417°N 50.268278°E
- System: Samara Metro station
- Platforms: 1 Island platform
- Tracks: 2
- Connections: Pyatiletka railway station

Construction
- Structure type: Single-vault, shallow station
- Depth: 12 m (39 ft)

History
- Opened: 26 December 1987
- Electrified: 825 V DC

Services
Preceding station	Samara Metro	Following station
Bezymyanka towards Alabinskaya	First Line	Yungorodok Terminus
Location

Kirovskaya is a station on the First Line of the Samara Metro. It opened on 26 December 1987. It is located in Sovietskiy District of Samara, beneath Kirova avenue, named after one of the Bolsheviks - Sergey Kirov and from which comes the station's name.

== Description ==
Almost like every station in Samara metro (excluding Rossiyskya station), Kirovskaya consists of a single platform with two tracks on a both side of a platform. Station's floor is made of granite and its walls are decorated with marble. Structure is a single-vault, shallow, like the Pobeda station. Station has a 2 exits and only 1, near the Kirovskiy market, is open.

== Perspective ==
Nowadays, trains departing from Kirovskaya station goes on the tracks, leading to the Kirovskoe yard and towards to Yungorodok station, which was planned as a temporary terminus until the Krilya Sovietov station would be opened. But, since the year 1987, construction of Krilya Sovietov was firstly stopped and then cancelled due to lack of finance. Only a short dead end tunnel from Kirovskaya towards Krilya Sovietov is left as a reminder of those plans.
