= Timeline of Nizhny Novgorod =

The following is a timeline of the history of the city of Nizhny Novgorod, Russia.

== Prior to 20th century ==
- 1221 – Nizhny Novgorod "founded by Vladimir princes as outpost against Mordvinians and Volga Bulgars."
- 1227 – Cathedral of St. Michael the Archangel (Nizhny Novgorod) built.
- 1330 – Pechersky Ascension Monastery founded (approximate date).
- 1370 – Convent of the Annunciation founded.
- 1393 – Nizhny Novgorod becomes part of the Grand Duchy of Moscow.
- 1515 – Nizhny Novgorod Kremlin built.
- 1631 – Cathedral of St. Michael the Archangel (Nizhny Novgorod) rebuilt.
- 1719 – Stroganov church built.
- 1817 – Annual Nizhny Novgorod Fair begins.
- 1822 – Old Fair Church of the Transfiguration (Nizhny Novgorod) built.
- 1849 – Nizhny Novgorod Machine Factory established.
- 1862 – Nizhny Novgorod railway station opens.
- 1867 – Population: 40,742.
- 1868 - Alexander Nevsky Cathedral construction begins.
- 1871 - Steamship Perevorot built and joined the Steamboats on the Volga River.
- 1881 – Population: 57,530.
- 1884 – 7 July: Ethnic unrest.
- 1896 – All-Russia Exhibition 1896 held; Shukhov Rotunda built.
- 1897 – Population: 98,503.

== 20th century ==
- 1909 – Kozma Minin newspaper begins publication.
- 1913 – Population: 112,300.
- 1917 – Nizhny Novgorod State Technical University founded.
- 1918
  - N. I. Lobachevsky State University of Nizhny Novgorod
  - Nizhny Novgorod Radio Laboratory established.
- 1920 – Nizhny Novgorod State Medical Academy established.
- 1926 – Population: 222,356.
- 1929
  - Shukhov Towers erected.
  - Nizhny Novgorod Oblast created.
  - Sormovo becomes part of city.
- 1931 – Avtozavodsky City District established.
- 1932
  - City renamed "Gorky."
  - Gorky Automobile Plant established.
  - Lokomotiv Stadium opens.
- 1939 – Population: 644,116.
- 1941-1943 – Bombing of Gorky.
- 1946 – Russian Federal Nuclear Center established.
- 1947 - Nizhny Novgorod Research Institute of Radio Engineering founded.
- 1963 – FC Volga Nizhny Novgorod (football club) formed.
- 1965
  - Bor bridge built.
  - Population: 1,085,000.
- 1970 – Sovetsky City District established.
- 1979 – Population: 1,367,000.
- 1985 – Nizhny Novgorod Metro begins operating.
- 1989 – Population: 1,438,133.
- 1990 – Nizhny Novgorod Chamber of Commerce established.
- 1991 – Boris Nemtsov becomes governor of Nizhny Novgorod Oblast.
- 1992 – GAZ privatized.
- 1994
  - Nizhny Novgorod International Airport in operation.
  - Ivan Petrovich Sklyarov becomes mayor.
- 2000 – City becomes part of the Volga Federal District.

== 21st century ==
- 2002 – Burevestnik (Nizhny Novgorod Metro) opens.
- 2010 – Population: 1,250,619.
- 2012 – Nizhny Novgorod cable car to Bor begins operating.
- 2015 - FC Nizhny Novgorod founded.
- 2016 – 70th Anniversary of Victory Plant built.
- 2017 – Bor bridge II built.
- 2018 - Nizhny Novgorod Stadium opened.

== See also ==
- Nizhny Novgorod history
- History of Nizhny Novgorod
- Other names of Nizhny Novgorod
- Timelines of other cities in the Volga Federal District of Russia: Kazan, Samara

== Bibliography ==
- Abraham Rees (1819), "Niznei Novgorod", The Cyclopaedia, London: Longman, Hurst, Rees, Orme & Brown, hdl:2027/mdp.39015068382335 – via HathiTrust
- John Geddie (1885). "Nishni-Novgorod". Russian Empire: its Rise and Progress. London: T. Nelson.
- "Nijni-Novgorod", Hand-book for Travellers in Russia, Poland, and Finland (4th ed.), London: J. Murray, 1888
- "Nijni-Novgorod", Jewish Encyclopedia, vol. 9, New York, 1907, hdl:2027/osu.32435029752862
- Kropotkin, Peter Alexeivitch; Bealby, John Thomas (1910). "Nizhniy-Novgorod" . Encyclopædia Britannica. Vol. 19 (11th ed.). p. 721.
- "Nizhni-Novgorod", Russia, Leipzig: Karl Baedeker, 1914, OCLC 1328163
- William Henry Beable (1919), "Nijni-Novgorod", Russian Gazetteer and Guide, London: Russian Outlook
- Trudy Ring, ed. (1995). "Nizhny Novgorod". International Dictionary of Historic Places: Northern Europe. Fitzroy Dearborn. p. 541. ISBN 978-1-136-63944-9.
- Richard Cartwright Austin (2004). Building Utopia: Erecting Russia's First Modern City, 1930. Kent State University Press. ISBN 978-0-87338-730-9. (About Nizhny Novgorod)
- Catherine Evtuhov (2006). "Nizhnii Novgorod in the 19th century". In Dominic Lieven (ed.). Imperial Russia, 1689–1917. Cambridge History of Russia. Cambridge University Press. p. 264+. ISBN 978-0-521-81529-1.
