= Bezymyanka (Samara Metro) =

Samara Metro Station

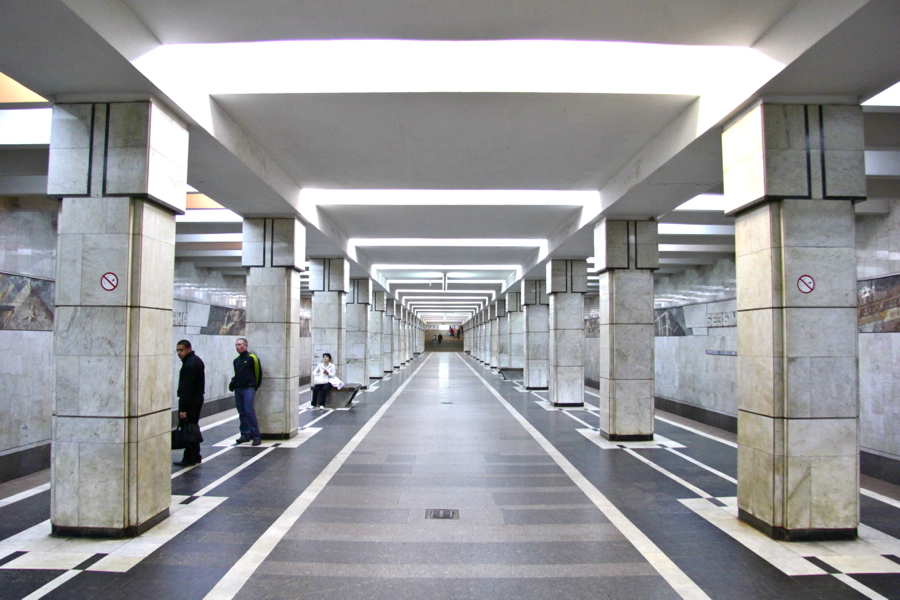

General information
- Location: Samara, Russia
- Coordinates: 53.212578°N 50.247478°E
- System: Samara Metro station
- Tracks: 2

Construction
- Structure type: Three-span, shallow-column station.
- Depth: 8 metres (26 ft)

History
- Opened: 26 December 1987

Services
Preceding station	Samara Metro	Following station
Pobeda towards Alabinskaya	First Line	Kirovskaya towards Yungorodok
Location

Bezymyanka (Russian: Безымянка) is a station on the First Line of the Samara Metro. It opened on 26 December 1987 as one of the four initial stations on the line. It is in the Sovetsky district of Samara at the intersection of Ulitsa Pobedy and Novo-Vokzalnaya Ulitsa. Its name comes from a railway station located 700 m southeast and literally means "unnamed".
