= History of Kazan =

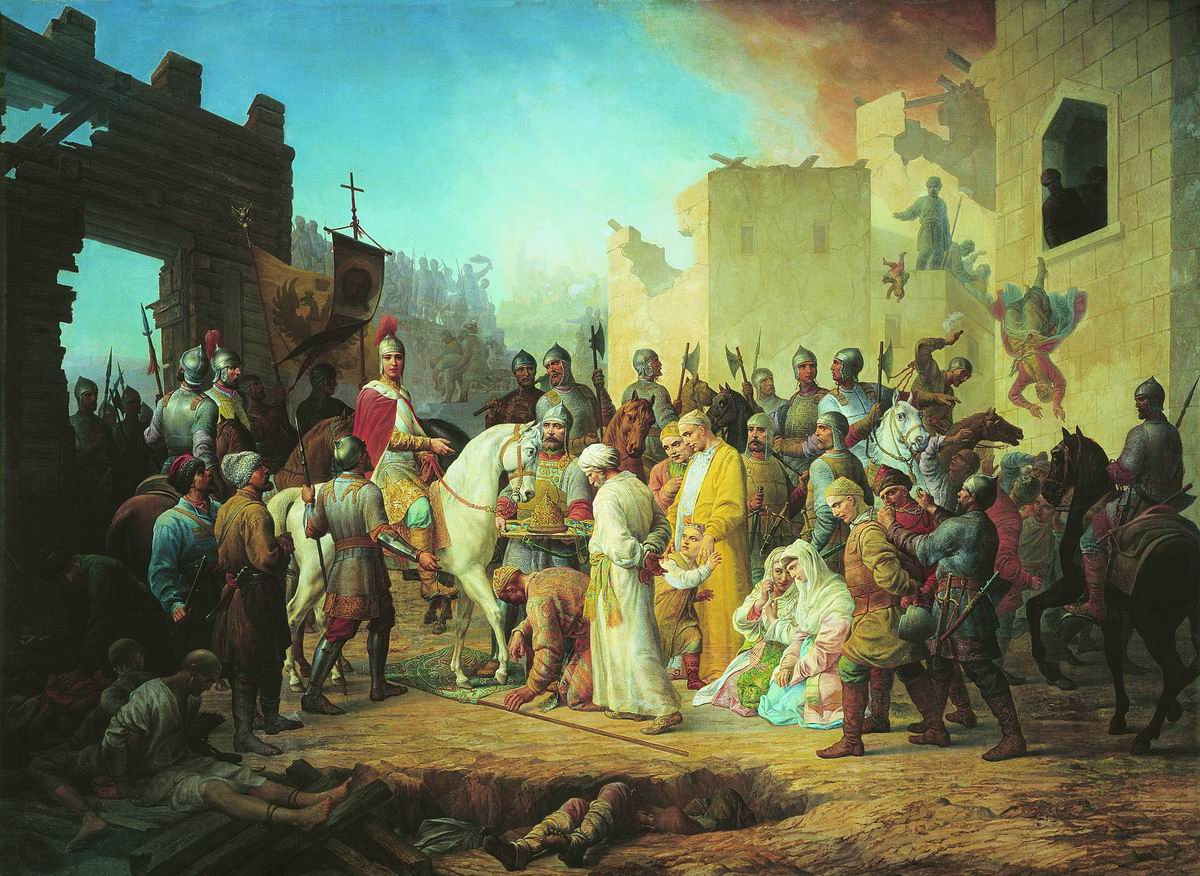
Ivan the Terrible Enters Kazan, by Pyotr Shamshin

== Etymology ==
The origin of the name Kazan is uncertain. It could very well derive from the Bulgars – the Bulgarian (from the Bulgar language) and Tatar word (absorbed from the Bulgars) qazan means 'boiler' or 'cauldron'. Alternately, it may have been derived from the Tatar qazğan, 'dug' (with reference to ditches). Qazan is originally a name for a special cooking pan, similar to the wok, but heavier. The belief that the city of Kazan is named after this object comes from the terrain's similarity to a qazan: the city is situated in a U-shaped lowland. Another, more romantic legend tells a story of a Tatar princess Söyembikä, who dropped a golden dish (golden qazan) into the river while washing it, and that the city was founded at that site. Additionally, legends of the Chuvash people refer to the Prince Khusan (Хусан) (this being the Chuvash rendering of the Muslim name Hasan/Husain) and that is the Chuvash name for the city. According to Abulgazi Khan, the father of Ulug Muhammad Khan is "Ichkile Hasan". He founded Kazan, which is why the Chuvash call the city Hasan (Khusan).

=== Historical naming ===
Historical affiliations

Golden Horde 1236–1438
Khanate of Kazan 1438–1552
Tsardom of Russia 1552–1721
Russian Empire 1721–1917
Russian Republic 1917–1918
Idel-Ural State 1918
Soviet Russia 1918
White Russia 1918
Soviet Russia 1918–1922
Soviet Union 1922–1991
Russian Federation 1991–present

- Bulgar (Chuvash): Huzan (Хусан);
- Tatar-Kypchak (now, 1928–1939): Qazan (Казан);
- (1939–2000): Казан;
- (1918–1928): قازان;
- (1918–1922), Arab: قزان;
- Russian: Каза́нь [Kazan];
- Turkish: Kazan
- German: Kasan, Latin: Casan, French: Kazan, Polish: Kazań, Latvian: Kazaņa,
- Finnish: (Old) Kasaani (New) Kasani

== History ==
=== First mention ===
The earliest chronicle mention of the first (old) Kazan is contained in the Rogozhsky Chronicle under 1391 in the description of the campaign of the ushkuiniks who plundered Сuketau and Kazan. This message is repeated in the Simeon Chronicle and the Moscow Code of 1479. New Kazan (modern) was founded in 1438 as the capital of the Kazan Khanate by Ulu-Mukhamed.

- Sources say that Kazan was founded by Perekop refugees (Tatars) from Crimea (Taurida)
  Translate: The Kazan, former Tatar, Kingdom received its name from its capital city, and it from the name of the river Kazanka (Kasanska), flowing around it with its winding bed. Kazan was built by Perekop refugees from Taurida, during the reign of Vasily II Vasilyevich in Muscovy. Vasily III Ivanovich forced it (Kazan) to take Tsars for itself, from it (the Kasimov Tatars). And then, when it (Kazan) began to rebel, he squeezed it with threats of a dangerous war, but did not subdue it. But in 7061 (from the Creation of the World), or in 1552 (from the Nativity of Christ), his son, Ivan IV the Terrible, took Kazan, after a six-month siege, along with it and Cheremis (Ceremissis), forced them to submit to the rule of Moscow. However, as a reward for the insult, he subjugated to it (Kazan) and to himself the neighboring Chuvash Bulgaria (Bulgariam), which he could not stand for its frequent rebellions, so that this country, not accustomed to obedience, would learn to bear foreign rule (colonization), and he decorated Kazan by establishing in it the Metropolitanate and the seat of the Chief Metropolitan. – Journey to Muscovy of Baron Augustin Meyerberg and Horace Wilhelm Calvucci, ambassadors of the August Roman Emperor Leopold to the Tsar and Grand Duke Alexei Mikhailovich in 1661, described by Baron Mayerberg himself. Original: Казанское, бывшее нѣкогда Татарское, Царство получило названіе отъ своего столичнаго города, а этотъ отъ рѣки Казанки (Kasanska), обтекающей его своимъ извилистымъ русломъ. Казань построена Перекопскими бѣглецами изъ Тавриды, въ княженіе Василія Васильевича въ Московій. Василій Ивановичь заставить ее брать от него Царей себѣ. А потомъ, когда она возмутилась было, онъ стѣенить ее лишеніями опасной войны, однако ж не покорилъ. Но въ 7061 году, отъ С. М., въ 1552 отъ Р. Х., сынъ его, Иванъ, взялъ Казань, послѣ шестимѣсячной осады вместѣ съ ея Черемисами (Ceremissis), заставилъ смириться подъ властью Москвы. Однако жь, въ видѣ вознагражденія за обиду подчинить ей сосѣднюю себѣ Болгарію (Bulgariam), которой терпѣть не мог за частые мятежи, чтобы эта страна, не привыкшая къ покорности, научилась носить чужое иго, и украсиль Казань учрежденіемъ въ ней Митрополіи и мѣстопребыванія Митрополита. — Путешествие в Московию барона Августина Майерберга и Горация Вильгельма Кальвуччи, послов Августейшего Римского Императора Леопольда к Царю и Великому Князю Алексею Михайловичу в 1661 году, описанное самим бароном Майербергом.
- An older mention of the name of Kazan is associated with a pot that was drowned in the river, as evidenced by the text:
  Kazan Tatars got their name from the main city of Kazan – and it is so called from the Tatar word Kazan, the cauldron, which was omitted by the servant of the founder of this city, Khan Altyn Bek, not on purpose, when he scooped water for his master to wash, in the river now called Kazanka. In other respects, according to their own legends, they were not of a special tribe, but descended from the fighters who remained here [in Kazan] on the settlement of different generations and from foreigners attracted to Kazan, but especially Nogai Tatars, who all through their union into a single society formed a special people. — Carl Wilhelm Müller. "Description of all the peoples living in the Russian state,.." Part Two. About the peoples of the Tatar tribe. S-P, 1776, Translated from German. — Johann Gottlieb Georgi. Description of all the peoples living in the Russian state : their everyday rituals, customs, clothes, dwellings, exercises, amusements, faiths and other memorabilia. Part 2 : About the peoples of the Tatar tribe and other undecided origin of the Northern Siberian. – 1799.page 8

=== List of Kazan Khans ===
Khans who ruled in the Kazan Khanate (1438–1552)

- Ulu-Muhammad, 1438–1445, was the founder of the dynasty of Kazan Khans.
- Mahmud (Makhmutek), 1445–1466, son of Ulu-Muhammad, after the death of his father, overthrew the local prince Alim-bek, captured the city and settled in the Volga region.
- Mustafa, 1446, brother of Mahmud, mentioned in one document as a khan. After Mahmud's death, a struggle broke out between Mahmud's children Khalil, Ibrahim, and their uncle and stepfather, Prince Kasim, for the Khan's throne.
- Khalil, 1466–1467. Herberstein calls Khalil by the diminutive name Khalilek and speaks of the high importance of his wife Nur-Saltan, thanks to whose marriage Ibrahim was able to establish himself on the Khan's throne. Sometimes the years of reign are indicated as 1464–1467.
- Ibrahim, 1467–1479, did not satisfy part of the Kazan nobility, who turned to Kasim, who, in turn, received support from Moscow. However, Kasim's campaign against Kazan was unsuccessful, the elderly Kasim caught a cold and died, and the conflict between the khans escalated into a war between Ibrahim and Ivan III.
- Ilham (Ali, Ilham-Gali), 1479–1484, 1485–1487, son of Ibrahim by his first wife, the Nogai princess Fatima.
- Muhammad-Amin 1484–1485, 1487–1495, 1502–1518, son of Ibrahim by his second wife, the Nogai princess Nur-Saltan, who entered service in Moscow.
- Mamuk, 1495–1496, Siberian prince who came to power in Kazan as a result of a coup and was then expelled by the Kazan people themselves.
- Abdul-Latif, 1496–1502, son of Ibrahim by his second wife, the Nogai princess Nur-Saltan, his stepfather and second husband Nur-Sultan was the Crimean Khan Mengli Giray.
- Shah Ali, 1518–1521, 1546, 1551–1552, Kasimov prince from a family that was in a blood feud with the Crimean khans. He was appointed to the khanate at the age of 13 by Vasily III "from his own hand".
- Sahib Giray, 1521–1525, Crimean prince who captured Kazan as a result of the Kazan rebellion against Shah Ali.
- Safa Giray, 1525–1532, 1535–1546, 1546–1549, 13-year-old nephew of Sahib Giray, to whom he transferred the throne under the pretext of performing the Hajj (in reality, Sahib Giray lost support from Crimea as a result of civil strife and considered it best to leave Kazan in view of the worsening military and political situation).
- Jan Ali, 1532–1535, 15-year-old prince of Kasimov, brother of Shah Ali.
- Utyamysh Giray, 1549–1551, a 2-year-old infant during the regency of Syuyumbike, became khan after the death of Safa Giray.
- Yadygar-Muhammad, 1552, Astrakhan prince Ediger-Magmed Kasayevich, sent to the khanate to the rebellious inhabitants of Kazan from the Nogai Horde.

Not a single ruler of Bulgarian origin.

=== Middle ages ===
There is a long-running dispute as to whether Kazan was founded by the Volga Bulgars in the early Middle Ages or by the Tatars of the Golden Horde in the mid-15th century, as written records before the latter period are sparse. If there were a Bulgar city on the site, estimates of the date of its foundation range from the early 11th century to the late 13th century (see Iske Qazan). It was a border post between Volga Bulgaria and two Finnic tribes, the Mari and the Udmurt. Another vexatious question is where the citadel was built originally. Archaeological explorations have produced evidence of urban settlement in three parts of the modern city: in the Kremlin; in Bişbalta at the site of the modern Zilantaw monastery; and near the Qaban lake. The oldest of these seems to be the Kremlin.

If Kazan existed in the 11th and 12th centuries, it could have been a stop on a Volga trade route from Scandinavia to Iran. It was a trade center, and possibly a major city for Bulgar settlers in the Kazan region, although their capital was further south at the city of Bolğar.

After the Mongols devastated the Bolğar and Bilär areas in the 13th century, migrants resettled Kazan. Kazan became a center of a duchy which was a dependency of the Golden Horde. Two centuries later, in the 1430s, Hordian Tatars (such as Ghiasetdin of Kazan) usurped power from its Bolghar dynasty.

Some Tatars also went to Lithuania, brought by Vytautas the Great.

In 1438, after the destruction of the Golden Horde, Kazan became the capital of the powerful Khanate of Kazan. The city bazaar, Taş Ayaq (Stone Leg)' became the most important trade center in the region, especially for furniture. The citadel and Bolaq channel were reconstructed, giving the city a strong defensive capacity. The Russians managed to occupy the city briefly several times.

=== The Tsarist period ===
As a result of the Siege of Kazan (1552) Russia under Ivan the Terrible conquered the city for good, the majority of the population was massacred. From During the governorship of Alexander Gorbatyi-Shuisky, most of the khanates's Tatar residents were killed or forcibly Christianized. Mosques and palaces were ruined. The surviving Tatar population was moved to a place 50 kilometres (31 mi) away from the city and this place was forcibly settled by Russian farmers and soldiers. Tatars in the Russian service were settled in the Tatar Bistäse settlement near the city's wall. Later Tatar merchants and handicraft masters also settled there. During this period, Kazan was largely destroyed as a result of several great fires. After one of them in 1579, the icon Our Lady of Kazan was discovered in the city. In the early 17th century, at the beginning of the Time of Troubles in Russia, the Kazan Khanate declared independence with the help of the Russian population, but this independence was suppressed by Kuzma Minin in 1612.

During his stay in Kazan in the 1640s, Adam Olearius reported that the Kazan Kremlin was "occupied only by the Russians, and not a single Tatar could live there, under penalty of death". During the Tsarist period, much of the local Tatar architecture was destroyed.

=== In the Russian Empire ===
In 1708, the Khanate of Kazan was abolished, and Kazan became the center of a guberniya. After Peter the Great's visit, the city became a center of shipbuilding for the Caspian fleet. The major Russian poet Gavrila Romanovich Derzhavin was born in Kazan in 1743, the son of a poor country squire of Tatar ancestry though himself having a thoroughly Russian identity. Kazan was largely destroyed in 1774 as a result of the Pugachev revolt, a revolt by border troops and peasants led by the Don Cossack ataman (captain) Yemelyan Pugachev, but was rebuilt soon afterwards, during the reign of Catherine the Great. Catherine also decreed that mosques could again be built in Kazan, the first being Marjani Mosque. But discrimination against the Tatars continued. In the beginning of the 19th century Kazan State University and printing press were founded by Alexander I. It became an important center for Oriental Studies in Russia. The Qur'an was first printed in Kazan in 1801. Kazan became an industrial center and peasants migrated there to join its industrial workforce. In 1875, a horse tramway appeared; 1899 saw the installation of a tramway. After the Russian Revolution of 1905, Tatars were allowed to revive Kazan as a Tatar cultural center. The first Tatar theater and the first Tatar newspaper appeared.

=== Soviet period ===
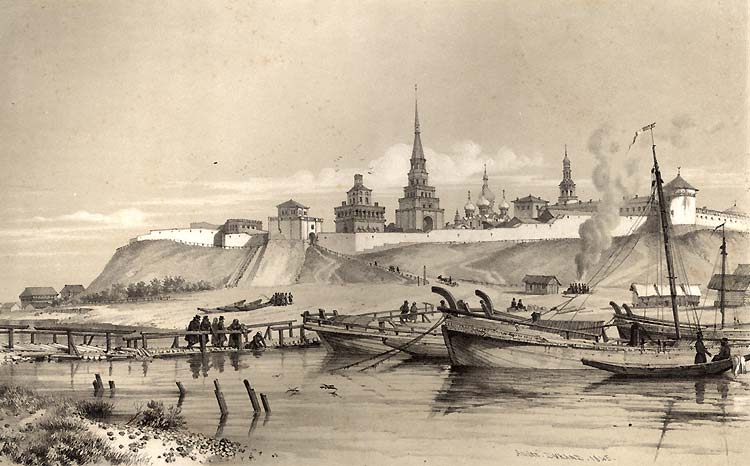
Kazan as it appeared before the turn of the 20th Century.

In 1917, Kazan became one of the revolution centers, Gunpowder Plant fire occurred in the city. In 1918, Kazan was a capital of the Idel-Ural State, which was suppressed by the Bolshevist government. In the Kazan Operation of August 1918, it was briefly occupied by Czechoslovak Legions. In 1920 (after the October Revolution), Kazan became the center of Tatar Autonomous Soviet Socialist Republic. In the 1920s and 1930s, most of the city's mosques and churches were destroyed, as occurred elsewhere in the USSR. During World War II, many industrial plants and factories to the west were relocated in Kazan, making the city a center of the military industry, producing tanks and planes. After the war, Kazan consolidated as industrial and scientific center. In 1979, the city's population reached the number of 1 million. Around this period the city was gripped by a moral panic in the form of the rise of juvenile delinquency and street gangs in what became known as the "Kazan phenomenon".

=== Modern times ===
In the late 1980s and in the 1990s, after the dissolution of the USSR, Kazan again became the center of Tatar culture, and separatist tendencies intensified. With the return of a capitalist era, Kazan became one of the most important centers of Russian Federation. The city came up from 10th to 6th position in population ranking of Russian cities. Since 2000, the city has been undergoing a renovation. The historical center, including its Kremlin, has been rebuilt. Kazan celebrated its millennium in 2005, although the date of the «millennium», was fixed rather arbitrarily. During the millennium celebrations, one of the largest mosque in Russia, Qolsharif, was inaugurated in the Kazan Kremlin, the holiest copy of Our Lady of Kazan was returned to the city, and the "Millennium Bridge" was also inaugurated that year. The city hosted the 2013 Summer Universiade and 2018 FIFA World Cup. In 2021, a mass shooting occurred at a school.

== Timeline ==
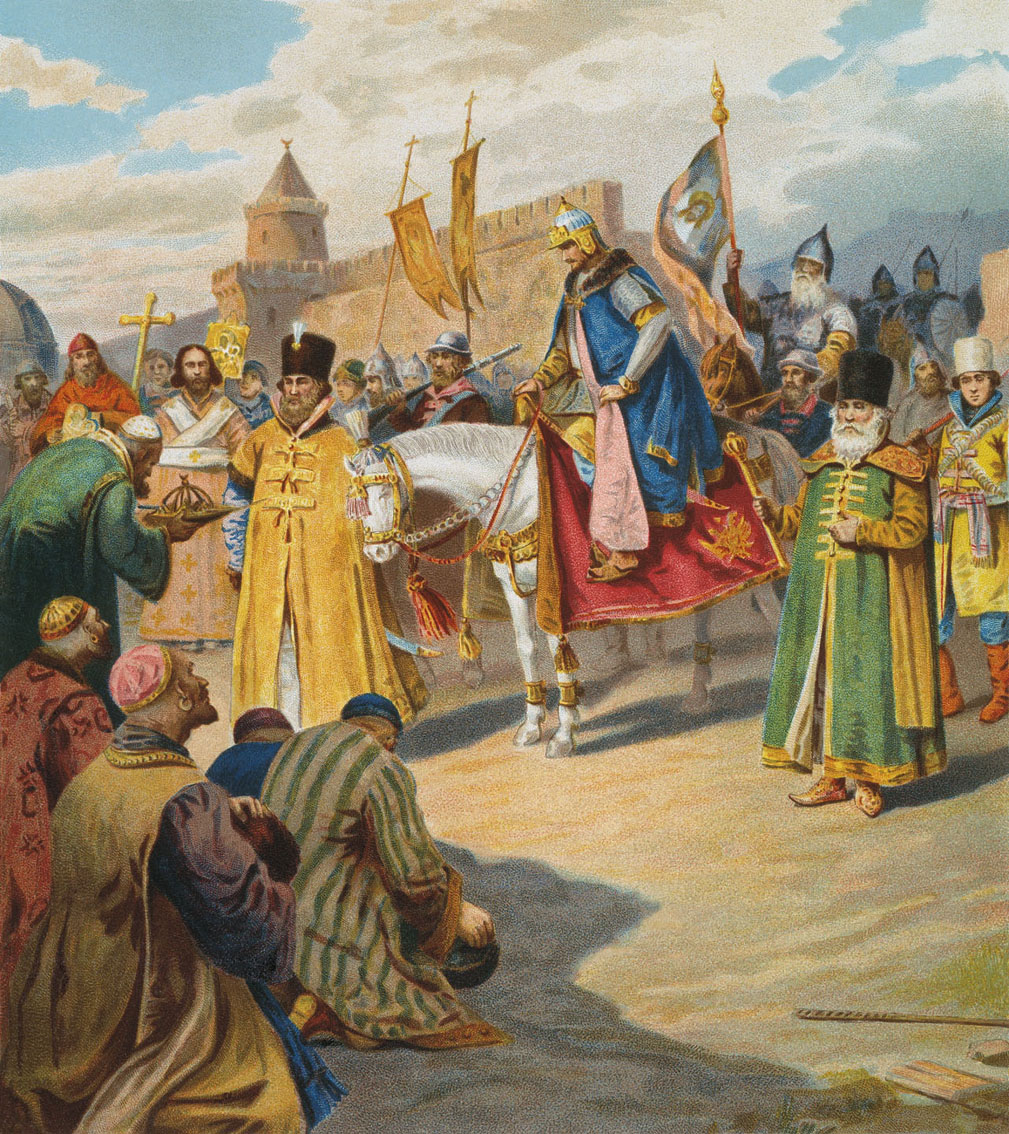
Ivan IV under the walls of Kazan by Pyotr Korovin

- End of the 10th — beginning of the 11th century – the city was founded
- End of the 14th — beginning of the 15th century Kazan becomes a capital of Kazan khanate
- 1408 – starts to mint own coins
- 1552 Kazan was seized by Ivan the Terrible and Kazan khanate became a part of Russian state
- 1556 – construction of modern Kremlin
- Since 1708 – centre of Kazan province
- 1759 – the first provincial classical school was opened
- 1771 – two madrasahs were opened (Akhun and Apanay)
- 1791 – first theatre was opened
- 1804 – Kazan State University was opened
- 1874 – gas lighting in Kazan
- 1896 – connected to Moscow by railroad
- 1899 – electrical tram and urban water supply started to work
- 1920 – Kazan is a capital of Tatar Autonomous Soviet Socialistic Republic (and then Tatarstan)
- 1979 – population is over 1 million inhabitants
- 2005 – Kazan Metro was opened
