= History of Samara =

Samara, known from 1935 to 1991 as Kuybyshev, is the largest city and administrative centre of Samara Oblast in Russia.

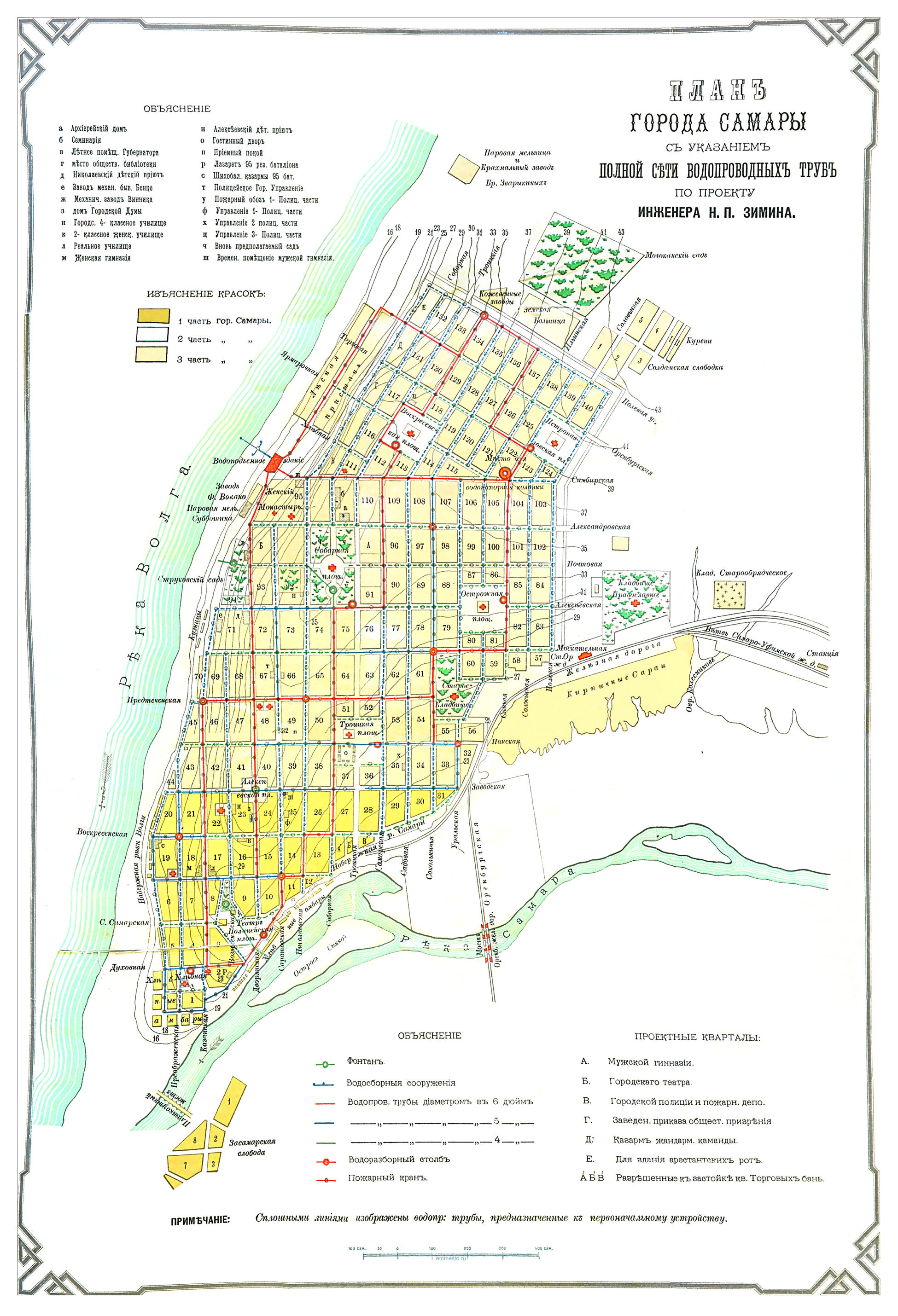
Map of Samara, 1886

== Early history ==
In Western European Sources information of Central Asia in the third quarter of the 12th Century is unknown. Information of Central Asia appears in Europe in connection with the legendary figure of Prester John, which dates from 1165.

One of the earliest document where the toponym is mentioned is the Chronicle by Hugh of Saint Victor, one of the founders of the 12th century Saint Victorian school of theology. He established the chronicle named the Description of World Map, in which the most important cities and settlements were shown.

In the Book of Extractions by Richard of Saint Victor, which dates from 1153 to 1162, it mentioned Samara. Samara among other Scythian cities is located beyond the Caucasian mountains in the northeast.

On the Christianization of the ruling elite of the Khazar Kaganate in the 8th century, archeological investigations in the region of the “country” Belendzher in the Caucasus testify . Later, under the onslaught of the Arab troops, the Khazars will move to the north, there will be a massive subsidence on the ground, resulting in a so-called Saltov-Mayak culture, which currently rests at the bottom of the Sulak Hydroelectric Power Plant . Note that such “mini-Atlantis” on the site of the Khazar urban centers were formed on the territory of the USSR due to the creation of reservoir systems . The funerary complex around Chir-Yurt belongs to three ethnic groups that inhabited the city: Alans ( catacomb burials ), Bulgarians( pit burials ), Khazars (kurkan catacombs). In the kurgan section of the cemetery where the Khazars rested, scientists discovered two small churches of the 8th century, which is a clear indication of the Christianization of the ruling elite of the Kaganate before its Judaization at the turn of the 8th — 9th centuries. On the Middle Volga in the steppe valleys of the Samara Luka in the beginning of the 21st century, several burial grounds with sub-burial burials of the turn of the 7th — 8th centuries were investigated, which are similar to the kurgan burials of the Lower Volga and the Don. For example, in one rich burial were found overlays from onions of “Khazar type”. The presence of the Khazars is marked far to the north of the Samara Luka. In the cemetery with a Shilovka (about 100 km to the north along the Volga), in a rich burial, in addition to the golden Byzantine solidarity of the 7th century, there were also bone plates with hunting scenes, images of soldiers on the fortress wall, etc. Experts believe that the patterns on the bone plates are close to the images on silver dishes, which were made in one of the Khazar jewelry workshops.

In addition to the legend relating to the “Kasr” (from the Arabic. “Castle”) Samara, the artists edged the miniature of the city with rivers. At the source of the river Samara (Samur ), which flows into the Volga, the artist placed the image of the only tree on the whole map. From the bottom of the tree flows eastward stream. Near the "miracle tree" comment: "Here is a tree from which water flows" (perhaps, we are talking about the tree Betula alba (pendula) - birch and birch sap). The source of this legend we find in the report of Ibn Fadlan, who is part of the embassy of the Abbasid Caliph al-Muqtadir(908–932) visited Volga Bulgaria in May 922. It can be assumed that this information came to the West from the Arab-Persian world or through Byzantium, or through Sicily, during the reign of Emperor Frederick II of Hohenstaufen (1194–1250).

If we talk about the archaeological evidence of the times of the Golden Horde, then in the Samara area there are two settlement sites that relate to this era: one is 20 km below the settlement of Singiley; another in front of Samara near the village Perevolok . As early as the 19th century, ruins of brick and stone buildings visible above the ground were observed in the area of fortifications, silver and copper coins were encountered, but systematic archaeological research was not conducted there ^{[9]} .

On the 1448 plan-plan of the Benedictine monk from the monastery of St. Peter ^{[en]} in Salzburg ( lat. Ordinis Sancti Benedicti de Salisburg ) Andreas Walchperger ^{[en]} (born around 1415) on a large river in Eastern Europe is present the toponym “Samarchar” .

Fortified castle, located on the left bank of Edil (Volga) on the 1459 world map, Fra Mauro is called Samar ( Latin Samar ). Samar (a), surrounded by high fortress towers with battlements, between which there are passage gates, is located at the confluence of the “blue river” ( Italian fl [umen] coche su ) into the Volga. The name suggests that the waters of the river Samara in the Middle Ages were distinguished by purity and transparency. On this wonderful map of the world, based on the best graphic and written sources available to its creators, you can immediately place accents about the unlawful identification of Samara and Samarkand in foreign historiography for a long time - a legend placed near the city of Samarkand reads: “The Samarkand Kingdom . This Kingdom of Samarkand was ruled by Tamerlane ... This glorious city [Samarkand] was decorated with beautiful nobility by the most beautiful buildings, among which the castle was particularly notable for its size and power. The governor of this state was exclusively of that kind from which Tamerlan himself descended ”.

Al-Masudi's narrative about the adoption of Judaism in the Khazars during the reign of Kharuna al-Rushūda was based on an even earlier essay, now lost. There are two fragments, which are based on the protograph that has not come down to us. They were incorporated into the composition of the Arab cosmographer Shams ad-dun Muhammad ibn abỹ Tqlib ad-Dimashk (1256–1327). It says that at the time of Huruna ar-Rashūda the emperor of the Romans (apparently, it was Nikifor I (ruled in 802–811, since 803, together with his son Stavraki ), expelled the Jews from Byzantium. They moved to Khazaria,“Where they found intelligent and pious people, declared their faith to them, and they recognized it as the most correct, joined it, remaining [in this faith] for a while. Then the army fought with them from Khorasan, captured their cities, their country, they [the Khazars] became [their] subjects. Says Ibn al-Athir [an Arab historian who lived in 1160 - 1234 - approx. auth.] also that they converted to Islam in 254 [ on Hijra, i.e. in 868 - approx. auth.]; He points out that the cause of their acceptance of Islam was the military attack of the Turks. So they [the Khazars] asked for help from the people of Khorezm, and they answered: “You are the infidels, accept Islam, and we will help you.” They accepted Islam, except for their king, and the Khorezmians helped them, and the Turks withdrew from them. After that, they accepted Islam and their king.

We also cite information from the essay "News of Khozars, Burtas, Bulgarians ..." by an Arab geographer of the early 10th century. Abu 'Alū Ahmed Ibn' Omar, Ibn Ruste (Ibn Dusta), when the top of the Khazar state already accepted Judaism, i.e. roughly from 802/803 to 869/870 :“They call their king Isha [Beck - approx. auth.]; their sovereign, Khozar-Hakan. But this last only by the name of the sovereign, the real power belongs to Isha, since he is in a position of this kind with respect to the affairs of command and control of the troops, which gives no account to anyone who would stand above him. The supreme head of them professes the Hebrew faith; of the same faith as Isha, so are the captains and nobles who are with him; the rest of the Khozars profess a religion similar to that of the Turks ” .

== 16th century ==
The foundation of the Samara small town in the Samara natural boundary occurred in 1586 by decree of Tsar Fyodor Ivanovich on the bank of the Samara River near its confluence with the Volga under the direction of Prince G. O. Zasekinand the Streletsky heads of the “comrade” (deputy governor) Yelchaninov and Streshnev. The purpose of the fortress is the protection of shipping on the Middle Volga and the protection of state frontiers from raids by the steppe

The fortress was built on the territory now occupied by the Samara valve factory, and to the south of it - that is, in the direction of the r. Samara. It was built from May 22 to August 19. Art. (May 9 - August 6, Art. Art.) 1586. The first inhabitants were the serving people: the boyars' children, archers, gunners and collars, who carried the guard service, guarding the new fortress “from thieves” and from the Nogai attacks .

The fortress has not survived to this day (it burned down in the fires of 1690 and 1703), however, it was possible to restore its exact dimensions (perimeter 635 m) and location. The Samara fortress of 1586 was a fortification of two parallel log walls, which every 6–8 m were joined by transversal walls cut at them at a right angle. The space between the walls (its width could be different, reaching 3 m) was filled with earth and stones. The total thickness of such a fortress wall was about 5 m. The height of the Samara city wall is not known from the documents, but, following the height of the wall in the Volga cities, we can assume that it varied in different areas from 4.5 to 6 m. Samara Fortress had 8 towers, of which 4 were passable, that is, had a gate. The fortress towers are structures with hipped roofs, in terms of square, quadrangular or (at the corners) polygonal, with sides from 4 to 14 m long, usually 8–10 m high, with single towers about 6 m high or vice versa up to 15 m. The tower protruded 2–3 m outside the walls of the fortress. Inside the tower, three tiers ('battles') were equipped inside, each of which housed guns. Some towers did not have a hip roof, but all had clouds (or breaks) - an extended and overhanging upper part, due to which a vertical slot formed between the upper and lower layers of the walls for firing from above to the besiegers. The distance between adjacent towers varied, sometimes differing by half. Service on the tower was carried by a guard from one representative of the "boyars' children" appointed by the voivode and armed archers sent by the archer's head (for example, Kazan, usually 4 archers for each tower) usually 8–10 m high with single towers about 6 m high or vice versa up to 15 m.

Probably already in 1587 (in any case, not later than the beginning of the 1590s), the Samara fortress (or the city, or the Kremlin ) was surrounded on 3 sides by a second defensive line - a wall of guard type (1542 m long). Ostrog (more rarely, palisade ) is, in fact, a high fence of vertically standing log-piles with a diameter of 25–30 cm vertically standing close to each other. The height of the wall was 4-4.5 m (according to Laishev, Malmyzh and other fortresses of the Volga region). Samara fortress had 8 towers (probably four-walled ^{[24]}), and some of them were also passing. The combination of fortress and fort is typical of Russian defense town planning of the 16th — 17th centuries. They are interrelated parts of a single defensive complex, the general plan for the construction of which, apparently, already existed in 1586.

The topography of the Samara fortress in 1586, the fort, the first cathedral churches of Samara and the church of the first Samara monastery are presented for reconstruction.

The first image of Samara is widely known in the description and in the engraving by A. Olearius. The Holstein embassy of 1636 sailed past Samara "even before the rising of the Sun" and made only a brief stop, after which "they dismissed the sails and set off further." The channel of the Volga at that period was 2 versts from Samara (= 2.1 km). That is, the city of A. Olearius observed from afar and under unfavorable light conditions - in the predawn twilight or in the blinding rays of the rising sun in the east. Therefore, it is not necessary to rely on the accuracy of the transfer of A. Olearius to the location of churches and other details. But even in such conditions, the engraving correctly shows the number of towers and churches (except for the southern part of the fortress, which is the farthest from the observer, the worst part of the fortress), a cautious type of wall on the Volga coast is realistically reflected.

During the XVII century the city grew and continued to strengthen. By the beginning of 1700, the fortification of Samara included five lines of wooden fortifications: a fortress (the Kremlin), a fortress (two lines), and ancholes (also two lines, but dilapidated or collapsed). After the devastating fires of 1700 and 1703, a new fortress (the so-called "earthen") of 1704-1706 was built in the city. Its remains were discovered during the archaeological excavations of 2013–2014 on Khlebnaya Square.

== Later centuries ==
In the spring of 1646, the first household census of Samara was carried out with the suburb, the only settlement at that moment - Boldyrskaya - and the county (there is information about the early formation of the nobility around the city of Samara, and previous censuses). Thus, the fortress of Samara had all the rights of the city since its foundation in 1586.

In 1708 Samara - the ninth city of Kazan Province. Since 1719, Samara belongs to the Astrakhan province . Since 1728 Samara once again belongs to the Kazan province . Since 1780, Samara belongs to Simbirsk governorship . Since 1796, Samara belongs to Simbirsk province . In 1851, Samara - the provincial capital and the capital of the Samara province, numbering 15 thousand people. Since then, the city began to flourish; She was known as the "Russian Chicago" due to giant mills, numerous small factory, barns. In the city there were 375 trade shops, and the Samara province was the leader in the number of wheat collected in the Russian Empire . Since 1928, Samara becomes the center of the Middle Volga region . Since 1929, Samara is the center of the Middle Volga region . In 1935, Samara was renamed Kuibyshev, part of the Kuibyshev region . Since 1936, Kuibyshev (Samara) is the center of the Kuibyshev region . In 1990, Samara returned the historical name, the city is the center of the Samara Oblast.

== Modern period ==
On June 8, 1918, deputies of the All-Russian Constituent Assembly formed in Samara a government independent of the Bolshevik government. It was called the Committee of Members of the Constituent Assembly (Komuch). The chairman was Vladimir Volsky, a deputy from the Socialist Revolutionary Party.

In 1935, Samara was renamed Kuibyshev.

During the Great Patriotic War, Samara (then Kuibyshev) was actually the second capital of the USSR: the Government, diplomatic missions and many enterprises evacuated from the western regions (located mainly on Bezymyanka ) were located here. The level of industrial production increased 5.5 times by 1945 compared with 1940. For the Supreme Commander Stalin, a spare residence was built, now known as the Stalin Bunker, and available for visiting by excursion groups. The Bolshoi Theater worked in evacuation in Kuibyshev; here the seventh Leningrad symphony by D. D. Shostakovich was written and first performed .

== See also ==
- Timeline of Samara, Russia
