= Gagarinskaya (Samara Metro) =

Samara Metro Station

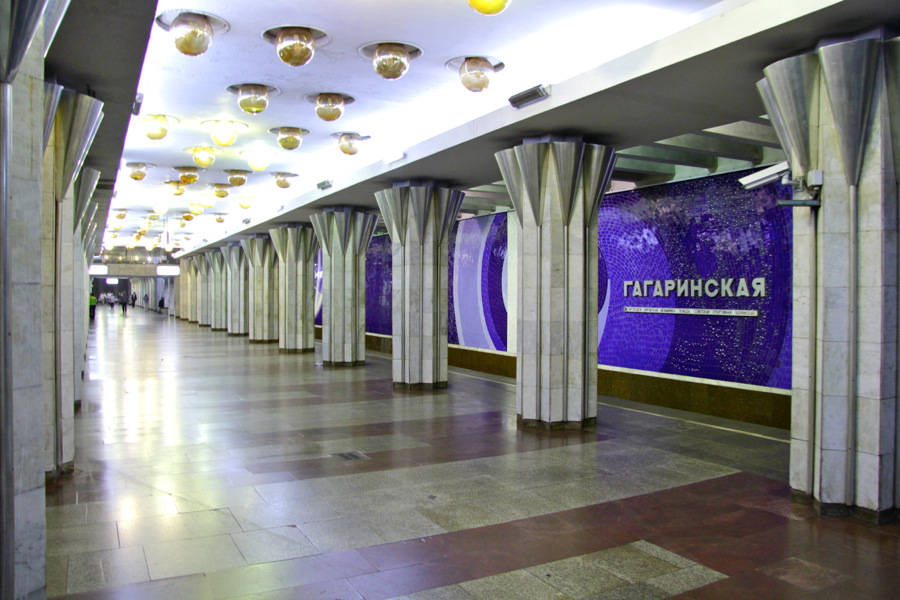

General information
- Location: Samara, Russia
- Coordinates: 53.200278°N 50.177472°E
- System: Samara Metro station
- Tracks: 2

History
- Opened: 26 December 1993

Services
Preceding station	Samara Metro	Following station
Moskovskaya towards Alabinskaya	First Line	Sportivnaya towards Yungorodok
Location

Gagarinskaya is a station of the Samara Metro on First Line which was opened on 26 December 1993, it is the deepest metro station in Samara (17,5 m).
