= Sportivnaya (Samara Metro) =

Samara Metro Station

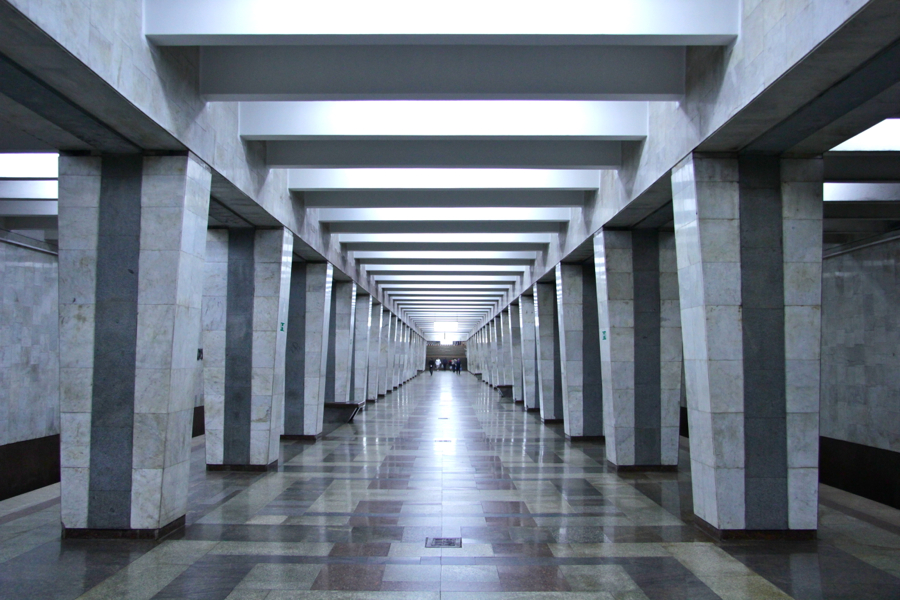

General information
- Location: Samara, Russia
- Coordinates: 53.200806°N 50.200028°E
- System: Samara Metro station
- Tracks: 2

History
- Opened: 25 March 1993

Services
Preceding station	Samara Metro	Following station
Gagarinskaya towards Alabinskaya	First Line	Sovetskaya towards Yungorodok
Location

Sportivnaya is a station of the Samara Metro on First Line which was opened on 25 March 1993.
