= Moskovskaya (Samara Metro) =

Samara Metro Station

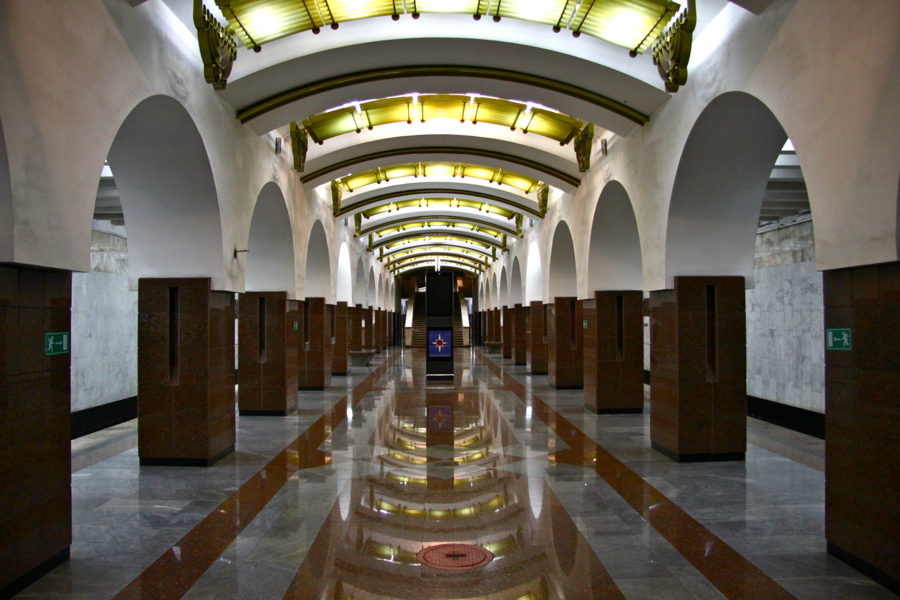

General information
- Location: Samara, Russia
- Coordinates: 53.202806°N 50.159917°E
- System: Samara Metro station
- Tracks: 2

History
- Opened: 27 December 2002

Services
Preceding station	Samara Metro	Following station
Rossiyskaya towards Alabinskaya	First Line	Gagarinskaya towards Yungorodok
Location

Moskovskaya is a station of the Samara Metro on First Line which was opened on 27 December 2002.
