= Sovetskaya (Samara Metro) =

Samara Metro Station

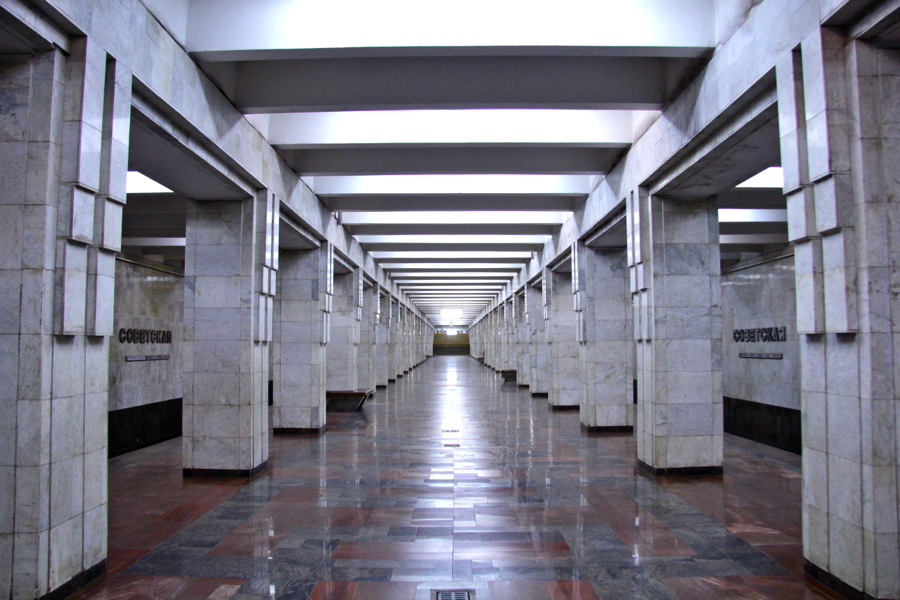

General information
- Location: Samara, Russia
- Coordinates: 53.201767°N 50.221667°E
- System: Samara Metro station
- Tracks: 2

History
- Opened: 31 December 1992

Services
Preceding station	Samara Metro	Following station
Sportivnaya towards Alabinskaya	First Line	Pobeda towards Yungorodok
Location

Sovetskaya (Советская in cyrillic) is a below-grade Light rail station of the Samara Metro on First Line which was opened on 31 December 1992. The name of the station translates to 'soviet'.

== History ==
The Sovetskaya metro station was opened on 31 December 1992 as part of Stage two of the Samara Metro project. The design was kept fairly simple due to financial constraints.
