= Vsevolod Luknitsky =

Russian general

Vsevolod Vsevolodovich Luknitsky (Russian: Всеволод Всеволодович Лукницкий, 1844–1917) was an Imperial Russian general-lieutenant, the chief manager of Kazan Gunpowder Plant from 1885 until his death. In 1917 during the fire at the plant he managed to flood most of the workshops and depots and prevented a major explosion which would have led to the city's total destruction. He was wounded by shell fragments from the explosions and died of blood loss on August 14, 1917.
