= Pobeda (Samara Metro) =

Samara Metro Station

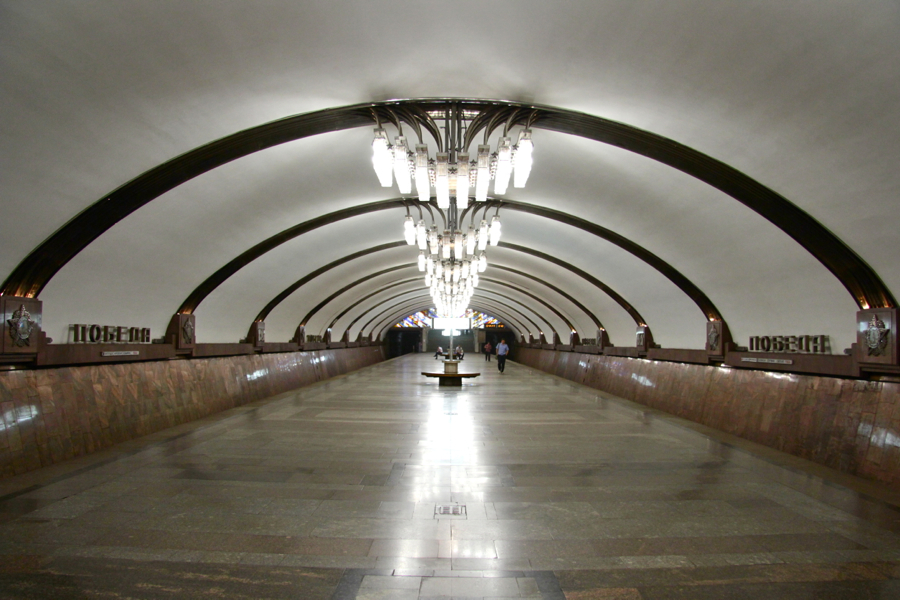

General information
- Location: Samara, Russia
- Coordinates: 53.206369°N 50.235061°E
- System: Samara Metro station
- Platforms: Island
- Tracks: 2

Construction
- Structure type: Single-vault, shallow station
- Depth: 8 m (26 ft)

History
- Opened: 26 December 1987

Services
Preceding station	Samara Metro	Following station
Sovetskaya towards Alabinskaya	First Line	Bezymyanka towards Yungorodok
Location

Pobeda (Russian: Победа) is a station on the First Line of the Samara Metro. It opened on 26 December 1987 as one of the four initial stations on the line. It is in the Sovetsky district of Samara. The name comes from the street on which the station is situated, Ulitsa Pobedy (Victory Street).
