= Kozma Minin (newspaper) =

Kozma Minin (Russian: Козьма Минин) was a Russian pre-revolution newspaper which had a literary-political character, the newspaper of Nizhny Novgorod governorate of the Union of the Russian People. It agitated against liberal ideology and revolutionaries. The newspaper received notoriety as for its antisemitism. It was printed twice a week from 1909 to 1917.

Editors:

- V. I. Kiselyov,
- G. R. Vasiljev.

== Literature ==
- Козьма Минин [Нижний Новгород, 1909—1917] // Русская периодическая печать (1895 — октябрь 1917): Справочник. — М.: Гос. изд-во полит. лит., 1957. — С. 173.
- «Козьма Минин» // Святая Русь. Энциклопедия Русского Народа. Русский патриотизм. Гл. ред., сост. О. А. Платонов, сост. А. Д. Степанов. — М.: 2003
