= Rossiyskaya (Samara Metro) =

Samara Metro Station

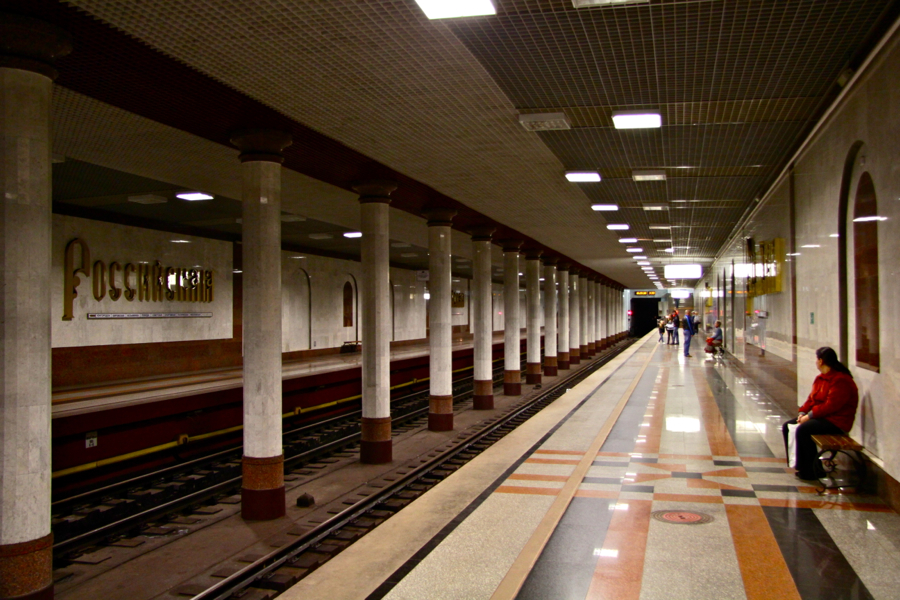

General information
- Location: Samara, Russia
- Coordinates: 53.211981°N 50.148611°E
- System: Samara Metro station
- Tracks: 2

Construction
- Structure type: Station with 2 platforms

History
- Opened: 26 December 2007

Services
| Preceding station | Samara Metro | Following station |
|---|---|---|
| Alabinskaya Terminus | First Line | Moskovskaya towards Yungorodok |
Location

Rossiyskaya is a station of the Samara Metro on First Line which was opened on 26 December 2007.

== About station ==
This station has 2 platforms, of which only 1 is functional. The first track (Towards Alabinskaya) works in this regime - Train arrive from Moskovskaya on First track, then depart to Alabinskaya where this train changes the movement direction and goes on same track back. Towards Moskovskaya there is a switch on Second track. Train from Alabinskaya arrive on this station and then goes through switch on Second track, then next train arrives on station. After opening of second track of Alabinskaya, the second track and platform of station will be opened for passengers.
