= Millennium Bridge (Kazan) =

Bridge over the Kazanka River in Russia

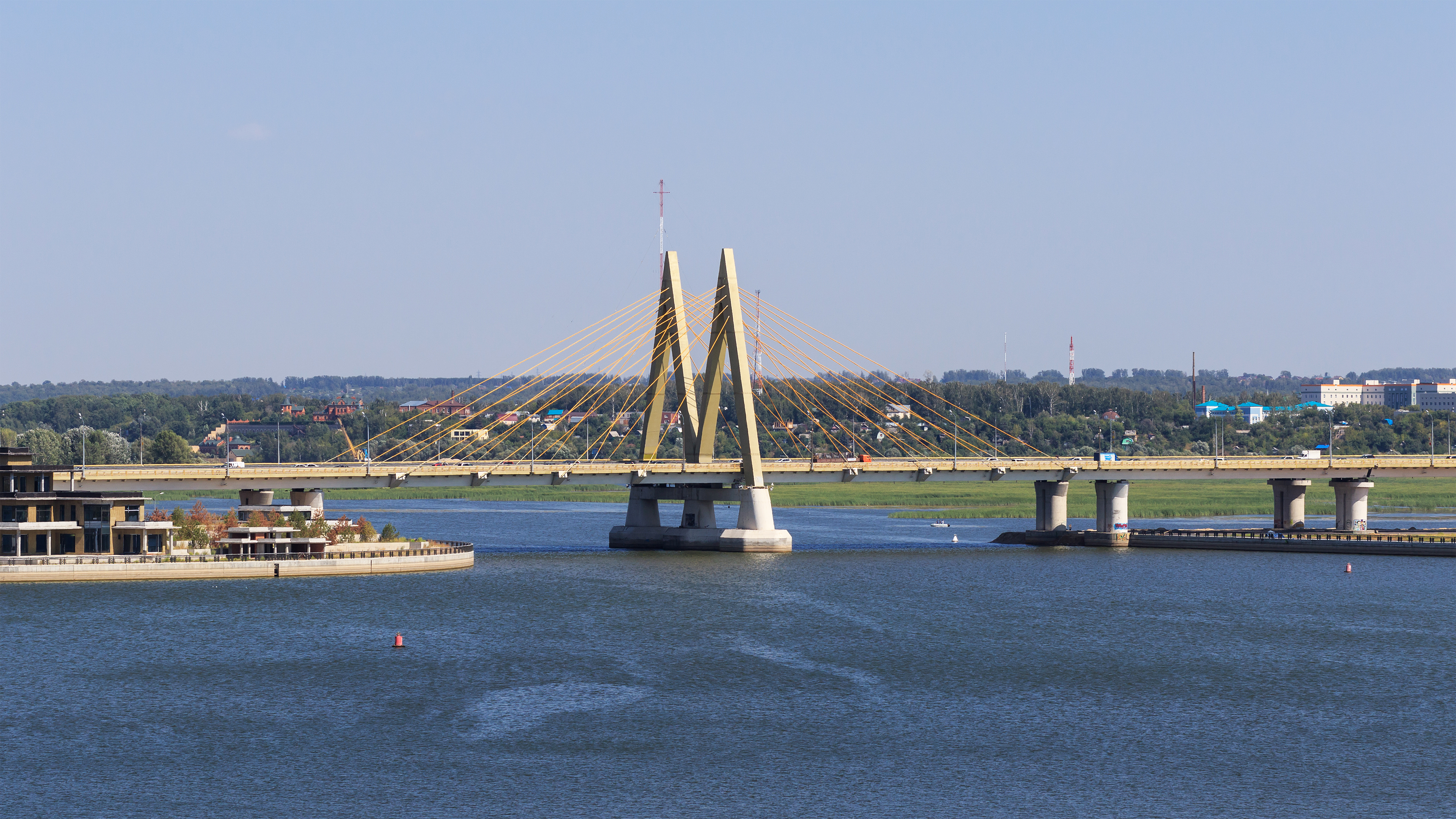
- Coordinates: 55°48′22″N 49°08′40″E
- Crosses: Kazanka River
- Locale: Kazan, Russia
- Official name: Millennium

Characteristics
- Design: Cable-stayed
- Total length: 835 m (2,740 ft)

History
- Opened: July 29, 2005

Location
- Interactive map of Millennium Bridge

The Millennium Bridge (Tatar: Милленниум күпере, Russian: Мост Милленниум) is a cable-stayed bridge that spans Kazanka River, in Kazan, Russia. Its name originates from Kazan's thousandth anniversary, widely celebrated in 2005, and from the shape of its M-like pylon.

The construction of the bridge began in 2004; the first part was opened to traffic in 2005 and the second part in 2007. The bridge cost approximately ₽3.4 billion (equivalent to $132,911,948, €97,092,092 in 2007).

It is 835 metres (2,740 ft) long. The main part of this bridge is the 45-m pylon which looks like the letter M. This form originates from Meñyıllıq (Cyrillic: Меңъеллык), the Tatar for thousand years old, or its Latin variant Millennium. The roadway carries three lanes of traffic and a pedestrian walkway in each direction. The bridge connects Gorky park and Fatix Ämirxan Avenue.
