= 2008 Kazan gas explosion =

Coordinates: 55.865°N 49.095°E

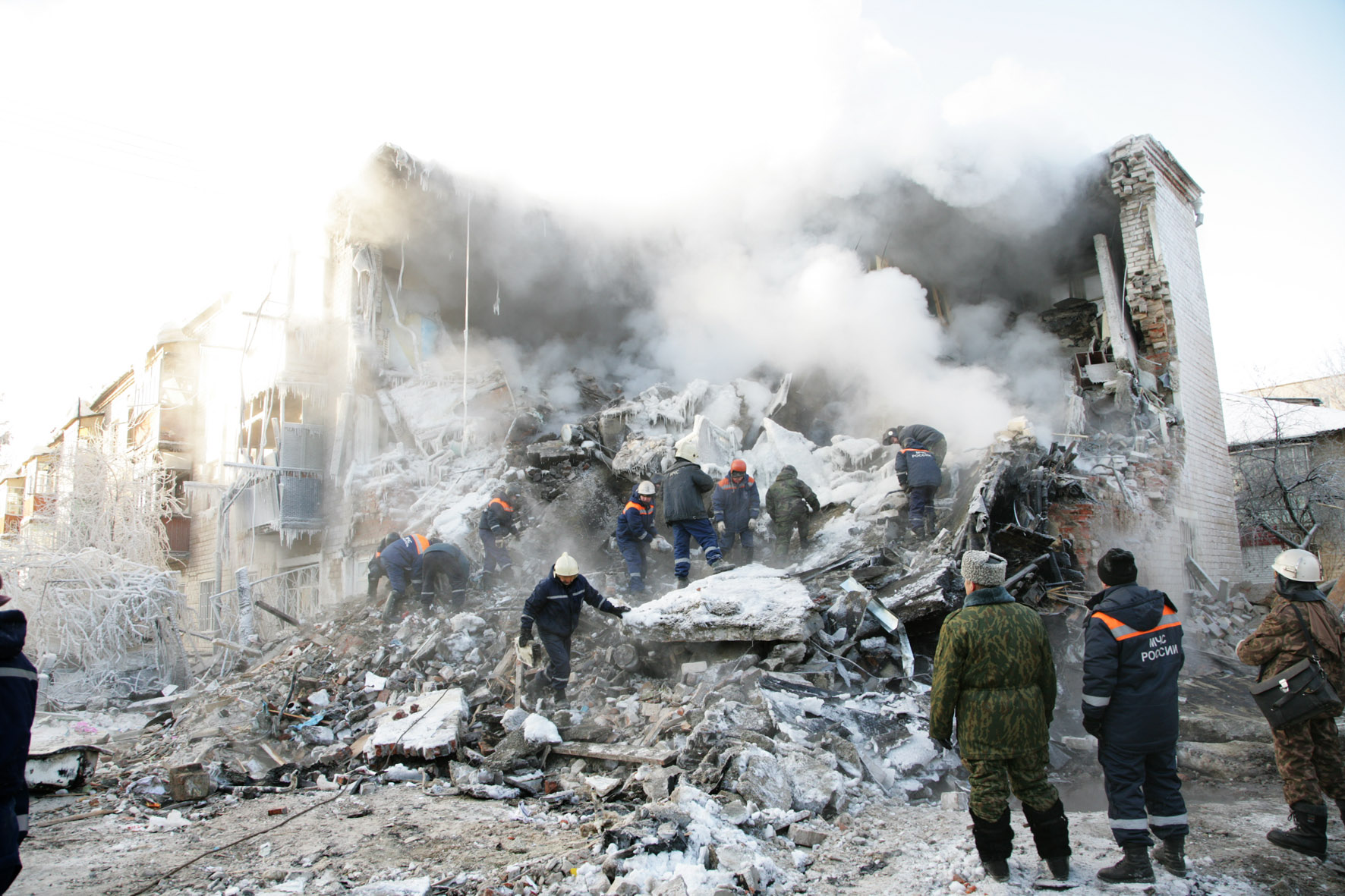
- Date: 9 January 2008
- Time: 00:28 (MSK)
- Location: Kazan, Tatarstan, Russia
- Type: Gas explosion
- Cause: Suspected accident
- Deaths: 10
- Injuries: 4

The Kazan gas explosion occurred on January 9, 2008, destroying an entire corner of a three-story khrushchyovka-style apartment building on Malaya Pechyorskaya Street in the Aviastroitelny District of Kazan, Tatarstan, Russia. The explosion took place at 0:28 a.m. local time (UTC +3).

== History ==
The blast destroyed 12 apartments and killed 10 residents, including one woman who died of blast-related trauma in a hospital after being rescued from the rubble. Additionally, two were non-fatally wounded.

Rescue efforts were complicated by low temperatures of −30 °C, raising concerns that victims trapped in the destroyed building might freeze before being reached by rescuers.

Three of the building residents, including one child, were not immediately accounted for. However, several body parts were found in the ruins, and subsequent DNA analyses determined that the young girl and her grandfather were both among those killed in the explosion. The girl's grandmother, also thought to have been in the apartment, is still counted missing.

The exact cause of the blast has not been established. While a criminal investigation was initiated, city authorities suspect that the cause may have been improper use of gas appliances.

The Kazan city government arranged for residents of the building destroyed in the blast to receive apartments in newly constructed buildings. On July 10, 2008, the first nine affected families received keys to new apartments in a building on Amirkhan Street. The residents received the apartments in exchange for their destroyed ones, an arrangement set up by the city-held OAO Residential Investment Company of the City of Kazan and supported by Kazan mayor Ilsur Metshin and the district administration. Families were also given the opportunity to pay for larger apartments at a discounted price per square meter.
