= 1917 Kazan Gunpowder Plant fire =

August 1917 fire in Kazan, Russian Empire

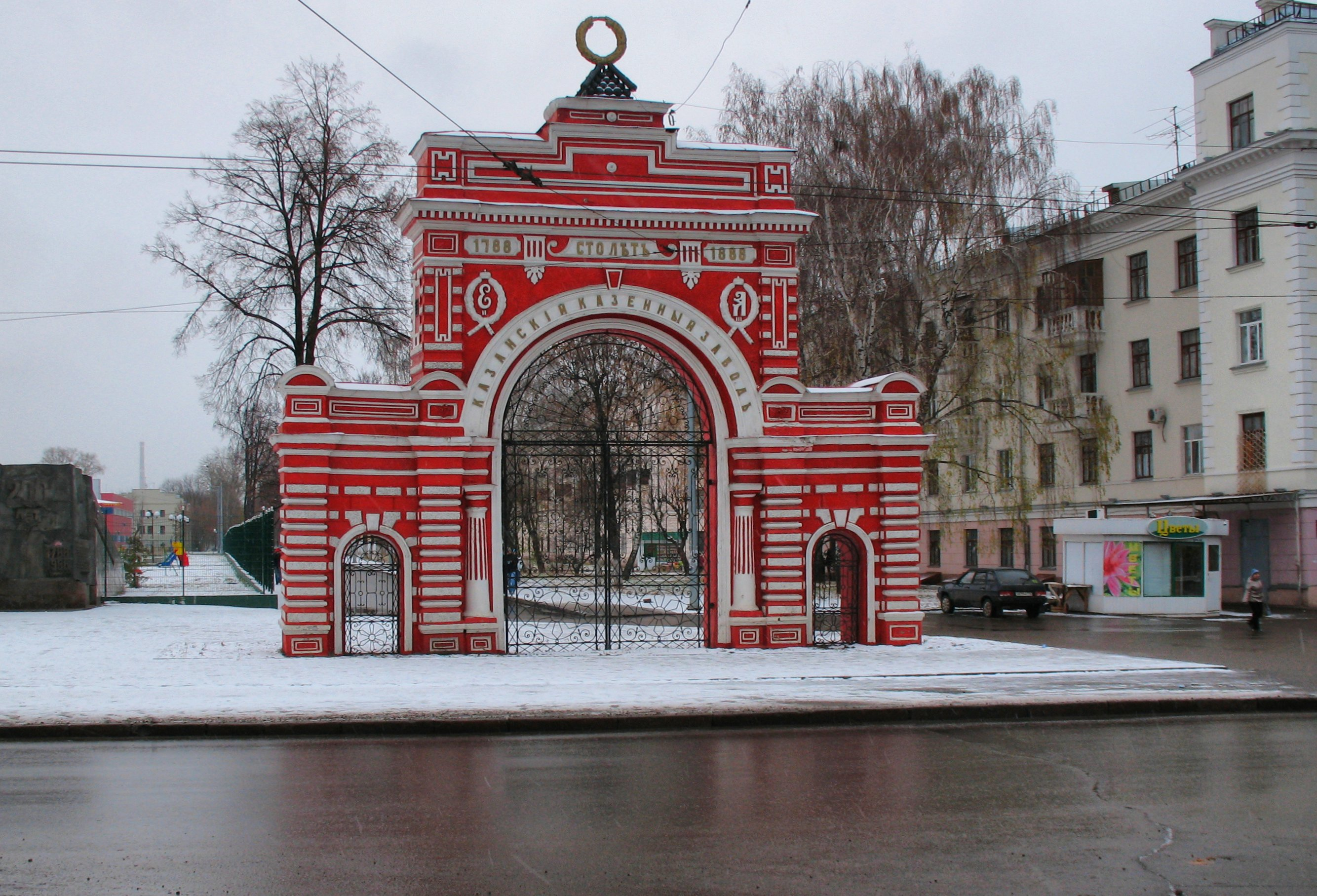
- Date: August 14–24, 1917
- Location: Kazan
- Type: Fire
- Cause: A negligent guard's cigar stub
- Deaths: 21
- Injuries: 172
- Property damage: 542 buildings

The 1917 Kazan Gunpowder Plant fire began on 14 August 1917 in the city of Kazan, which was then center of governorate within the Russian Empire, destroying the plant and spreading panic in the city on 14–16 August, which lasted at least until 24 August. Fire resulted in minor detonations of the shells in depots, scattered over the industrial part of the city. However, most of the explosives were flooded by water from emergency reservoirs; that prevented a major explosion. 13 were killed by the blast and fire, 8 died of wounds, and 172, including 30 children, were injured. The fire destroyed 12,000 machine guns and one million shells in depots (78,500 poods), and 542 buildings were destroyed, 152 of them totally. In addition, 1.8 million poods (29.5 tonnes) of oil were lost to the fire.

== Plant ==
The Kazan Gunpowder Plant was founded several kilometres west from Kazan in 1786 by order of Catherine the Great. Workers lived in the nearby Porokhovoy settlement, which was so big that it had its own church and mosque. In the beginning of the 20th century settlements were absorbed by Kazan. The plant had its own horse railway. It was one of Russia's best powder plants, one of the first started to produce smokeless powder in the Empire in 1893. In 1884 a minor fire occurred in the plant. After this first fire Vsevolod Luknitsky, an officer who had already worked for 11 years at the plant, was appointed director. He worked at the plant as director for 32 years, until the second tragedy occurred. In 1888 The Red Gates were constructed during an anniversary celebration, the only construction of the original plant preserved till today.

In 1915-1916 new workshops were built to the west of the old plant, and during the fire and explosion they also were damaged, but were soon restored. The original plant, except for the Red Gates was totally destroyed in 1917.

In 1917, 11,600 people, including 2,500 soldiers worked at the plant.

== Fire ==
The fire began from a negligent guard's cigar stub at Porokhovaya (now Lagernaya) railway station, the nearest to the plant. Shells, detonated at the station, set fire to the nearest depots and workshops. Oil tanks, placed on the bank of the Kazanka River, also caught fire. Workers from the plant fled to the opposite suburb of the city, spreading panic over the city. Many soldiers deserted the city, setting panic in the neighboring villages. The rumors said that over 500 were already killed, and Kazan Kremlin as well as the industrial area was totally destroyed. According to rumors, it would be a major explosion and toxic gassing as far as 80 kilometers from the city, as a wind blew from the plant to the city. Many of Kazan's 200,000 population fled, afoot and by trains. Ships were driven 20 km away from Kazan.

== Explosions ==
After the plant caught fire, shells scattered all over the industrial part of the city, Zarechye and some of them reached the banks of the Kazanka River and Kazan Kremlin, i.e. Kazan's downtown.

Just after the beginning of the fire Luknitsky arrived at the plant and personally unlocked a sluice to douse dangerous depots and workshops. However he was wounded by a shell detonation and died of loss of blood that night, on 14 August. The next two days fire devastated most of the plant, but no major detonation followed, possibly due to Luknitsky's personal heroism. After that he was referred to as a "person who saved the city". As contemporaries wrote, "a half of the city's population joined his funeral procession".

Martial law was declared in the city on the next day, as criminals marauded in deserted quarters. Militia cordoned off unexploded shells to protect civilians. After 16 August the small fires remaining were extinguished in the industrial areas.

== Consequences ==
The original plant was totally destroyed and later its lot was covered by a housing estate. The workshops built in 1915-1916 developed into the modern Kazan Gunpowder Plant.

During Soviet rule the official explanation of the explosion was based not on negligence, but on a diversion of counter-revolutionary movements. Allegedly they destroyed a plant to blame the proletariat in collaboration with Germany.

To this day some unexploded shells are found on the banks of the Volga; however, some of them could be attributed to 1918 warfare.
