= Samara Metro =

Rapid transit system in Samara, Russia

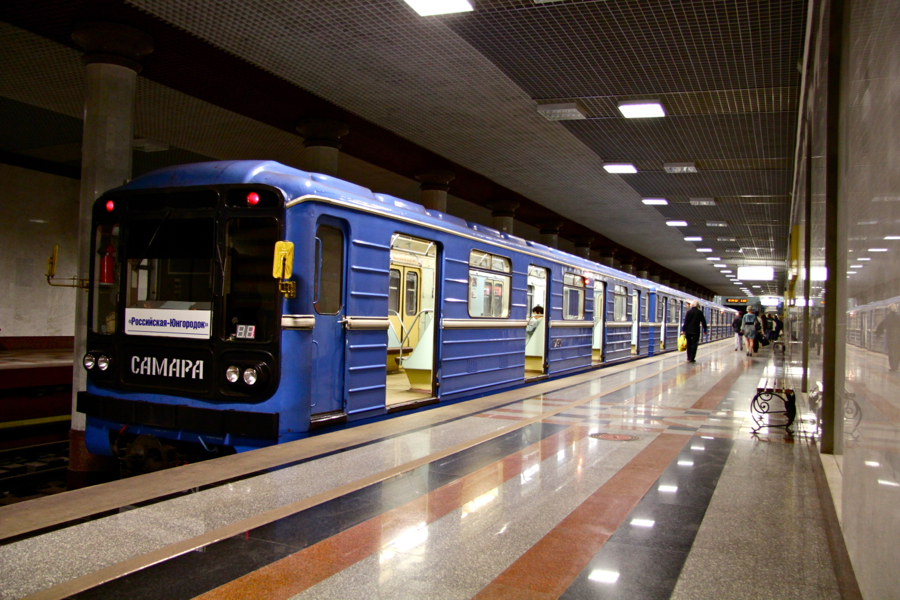
- Train made up of 81-717/714 cars at the station Rossiyskaya

Overview
- Native name: Самарский метрополитен Samarskiy metropoliten
- Locale: Samara, Russia
- Transit type: Rapid transit
- Number of lines: 1
- Number of stations: 10
- Daily ridership: 44,000 (daily average, 2012)
- Website: Samara Metro

Operation
- Began operation: 26 December 1987; 38 years ago
- Number of vehicles: 44 model 81-717/714 cars
- Train length: 4–cars

Technical
- System length: 12.7 km (7.9 mi)
- Track gauge: 1,524 mm (5 ft)

Samara Metro (Russian: Самарское Метро), formerly known as the Kuybyshev Metro (Куйбышевское Метро), is a rapid transit system which serves the city of Samara, Russia. Opened in 1987, it consists of one line with ten stations and approximately 12.7 kilometres (7.9 mi) of bi-directional track.

== History ==
The city of Samara (known during Soviet times as Kuybyshev) is situated at the confluence of the Samara and Volga Rivers. Being an important junction of several waterways and railways, the city grew rapidly during the 20th century simultaneously becoming an important industrial centre. In the late 1970s its population exceeded one million, passing the legal Soviet requirement to begin developing a rapid-transit system.

The design plan for Kuybyshev was based on the standard Soviet triangle arrangement, but with provisions to suit the dynamics of Kuybyshev, whose business, commercial and historical centre is situated on the edge, on the bank of the Volga River. Whilst the edges of the city were located with industrial zones and Soviet bedroom regions, most of the central regions (the geographical centre) between the areas were flats built primarily for the workers. It was also the central area which experienced the most concentrated congestion.

In the finalised plan, the first stage was to pass under this central artery and then expand westwards towards following the bank of the Volga around the commercial zone and eventually terminating at the city's central railway terminal. Construction began in 1980, on the first four station stretch totaling 4.5 kilometres (2.8 mi). On 25 December 1987 the system was triumphantly opened to the public, becoming the fifth such in Russia and the twelfth of the former Soviet Union.

Immediately after the opening of the first stage, which despite its modest size (compared to other Soviet systems) the Metro was overburdened with passengers. Construction of the second stage began shortly; however, this was slowed with the disintegration of the Soviet Union and the chaotic economic hardships that followed. Originally scheduled to open in 1991, the next three-station 4.5 kilometres (2.8 mi) segment opened slowly, one station at a time, between December 1992 and December 1993.

Despite the economic stagnation, the system managed to grow to length that allowed it to carry out its major transport role, unlike the ill-fated Nizhny Novgorod and Yerevan Metros throughout the 1990s.

Construction on the third planned stage, originally destined for the second half of the 1990s began in 1991, was extremely slow because of constant offsets. The first station opened in December 2002, the second following five years later in 2007.

The next station, Alabinskaya, was due to follow in 2010, however it has been delayed to 2015. Because Samara Metro builders helped to finish off Kazan Metro in 2005, the latter system donated its newer tunnel boring machine to bore the tunnels from Rossiyskaya to Alabinskaya.

=== Timeline ===
The Samara Metro has opened in stages, with the dates and lengths of each stage listed below:

Segment	Date opened	Length
Yungorodok – Pobeda	26 December 1987	4.5 km
Pobeda – Sovetskaya	31 December 1992	1.6 km
Sovetskaya – Sportivnaya	25 March 1993	1.4 km
Sportivnaya – Gagarinskaya	30 December 1993	1.5 km
Gagarinskaya – Moskovskaya	12 December 2002	1.3 km
Moskovskaya – Rossiyskaya	26 December 2007	1.1 km
Rossiyskaya – Alabinskaya	1 February 2015	1.3 km
Total: 10 stations		12.7 km

== Operation ==
The system is operated by a municipal company Samarsky Metropoliten that was privatised from the Russian Ministry of Rail services back in the early 1990s. The company is responsible for all management of the system, including management and repairs of tunnel and track, rolling stock, stations and even planning coordination of construction works.

=== Stations ===
The Samara Metro serves ten stations along its single line, as of April 2015.

=== Rolling stock ===
The rolling stock is provided by a sole Depot "Kirovskoye" which is responsible for management of all cars. Presentely there are 11 four-carriage trains assigned to the system. All of them are model 81-717/714 although some are .5 standard.

== Future ==
Map of planned metro network

The completion of the first line was originally planned for 2015. However, most of the development was stalled, due to political, financial, or bureaucratic reasons.

The work on two of the stations that were initially meant to lengthen the first line has been stopped because it posed danger to buildings of historical and cultural value.

The second line is expected to be 8.77 kilometres (5 1/2 mi) in length and have six stations. Its construction will take place as part of the program for development of the transportation system of Samara, planned for the time period between 2014 and 2025.

== See also ==
- Anton Buslov
- List of Samara Metro stations
- List of metro systems
