= Yungorodok (Samara Metro) =

Samara Metro Station

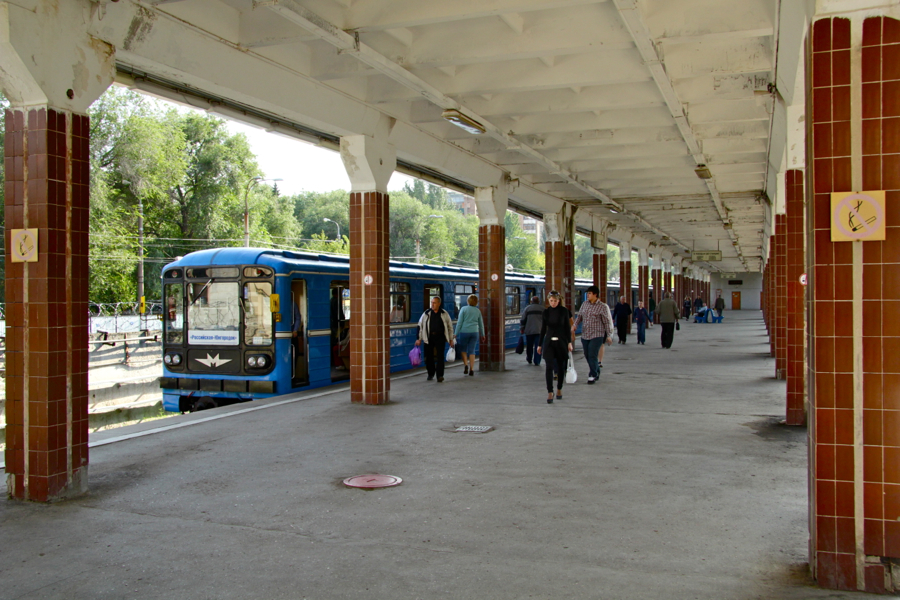

General information
- Location: Samara, Russia
- Coordinates: 53.212472°N 50.2825°E
- System: Samara Metro station
- Tracks: 2

Construction
- Structure type: Aboveground

History
- Opened: 26 December 1987

Services
Preceding station	Samara Metro	Following station
Kirovskaya towards Alabinskaya	First Line	Terminus
Location

Yungorodok is a station on the Samara Metro. It opened on 26 December 1987 and was intended to be a temporary station until the completion of Krylya Sovetov. When the government changed the plan for the Metro, Krylya Sovetov was abandoned and Yungorodok became a permanent station. It is the southern terminus of the line and the only aboveground station on the system. The name refers to the housing development Yungorodok, a section of Samara which means “young city” in Russian.

The station is in close proximity of Aviakor, Samara's Aviation factory. Yungorodok also has several tramway transfers including lines 2,3,10,17, and 19. The Samara metro train depot is right next to the station.
