= Alabinskaya (Samara Metro) =

Samara Metro Station

Coordinates: 53.2097°N 50.1344°E

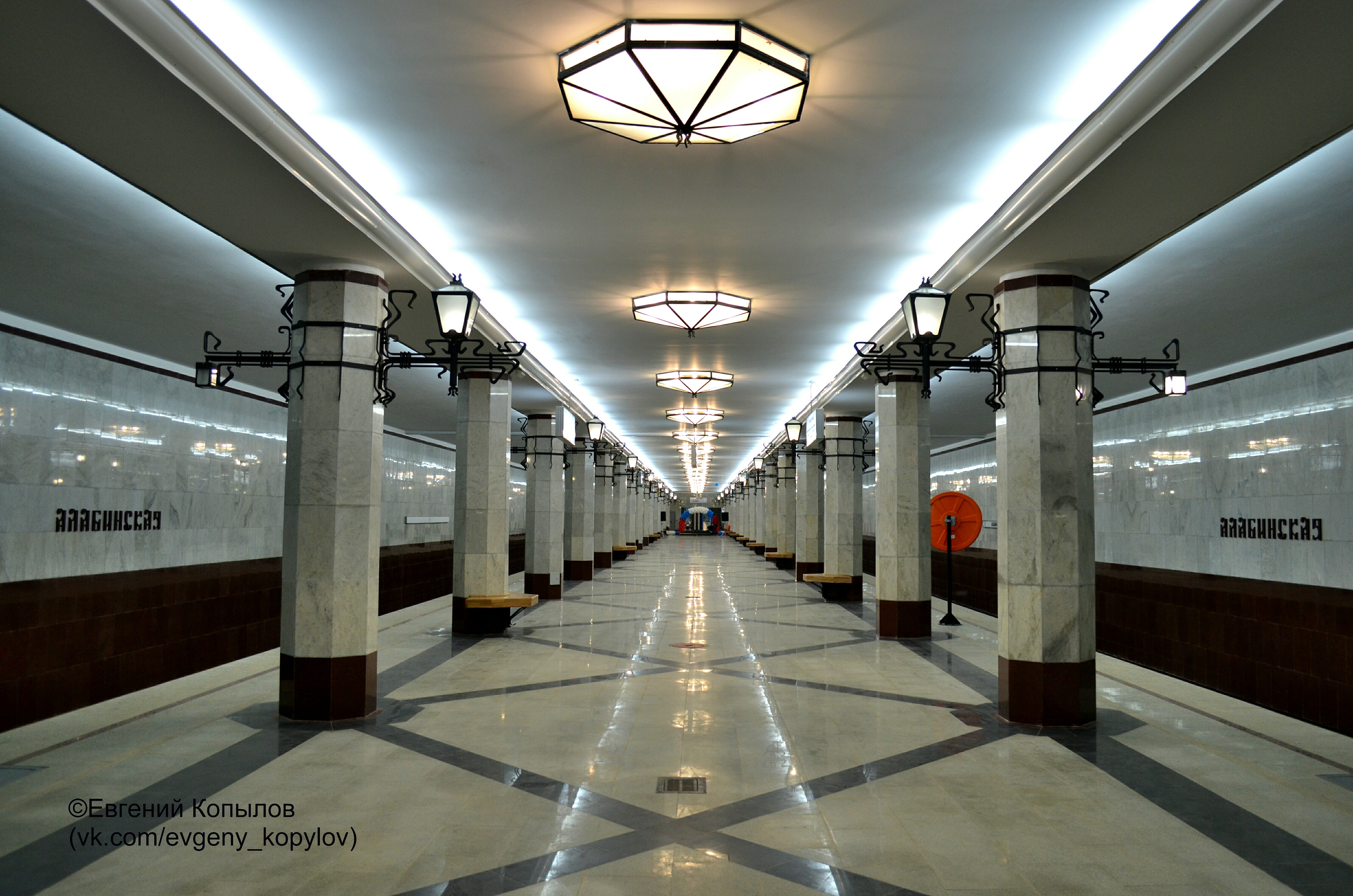

General information
- Location: Samara, Russia
- System: Samara Metro station

History
- Opened: 1 February 2015

Services
Preceding station	Samara Metro	Following station
Terminus	First Line	Rossiyskaya towards Yungorodok
Location

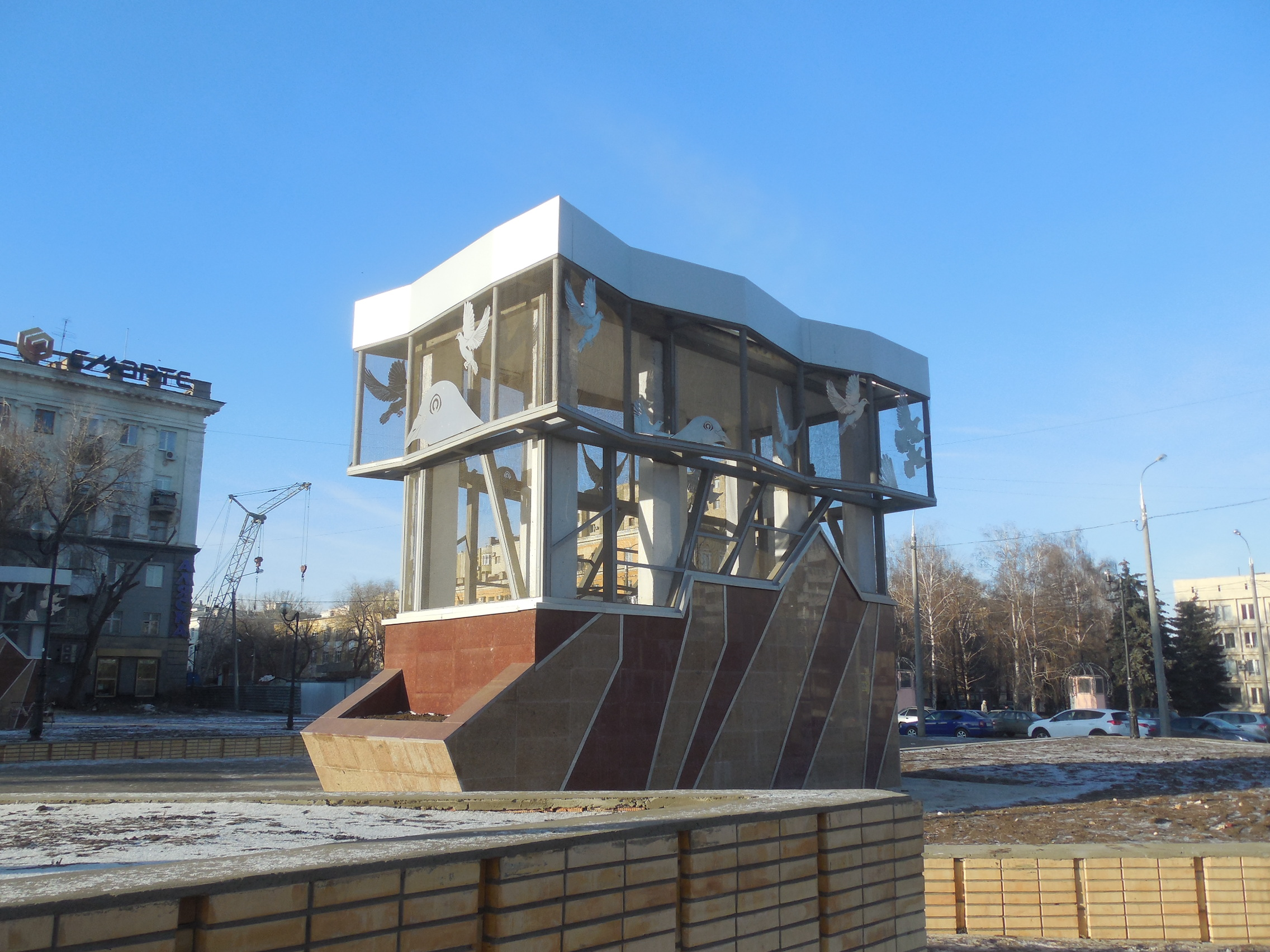
The unique architecture of Alabinskaya station.

Alabinskaya is a station of the Samara Metro on First Line which was opened on 1 February 2015. It is located in Oktyabrsky district of Samara.
