= Fatima Soltan =

Khan of the Tatar Qasim Khanate
- Reign: 1679–1681
- Predecessor: Sayed Borhan
- Successor: Monarchy abolished
- Born: c. 1602
- Died: c.1681 (aged 79); Kasimov, Qasim Khanate
- Spouse: Arslanghali
- Issue: Sayed Borhan
- Father: Agha Muhammad Shah Quli Sayyid

Fatima Soltan (Volga Türki and Persian: فاطمه سلطان; died 1681) was a sovereign khanbika (queen) and the last ruler of the Qasim Khanate from 1679 until 1681.

== Reign ==
She was a daughter of Agha Muhammad Shah Quli Sayyid and a wife of Arslanghali Khan. After the death of her husband in 1627, Russian tsar Mikhail Romanov appointed her and her father Agha Muhammad as regents of her three-year-old son Sayed Borhan. Until Borhan abdicated in 1679, Fatima Soltan resisted his marriage to a Russian princess and the policy of Christianization and discrimination against Muslims by the authorities in Moscow. After Borhan abdicated, she remained briefly in power as the last queen of the Khanate. The Qasim Khanate was abolished after her death.

Preceded by Sayed Borhan	Khan of Qasim; 1679–1681	Succeeded by none; the khanate abolished
