= Dzhan-Ali of Kazan =

Dzhan-Ali Canğali
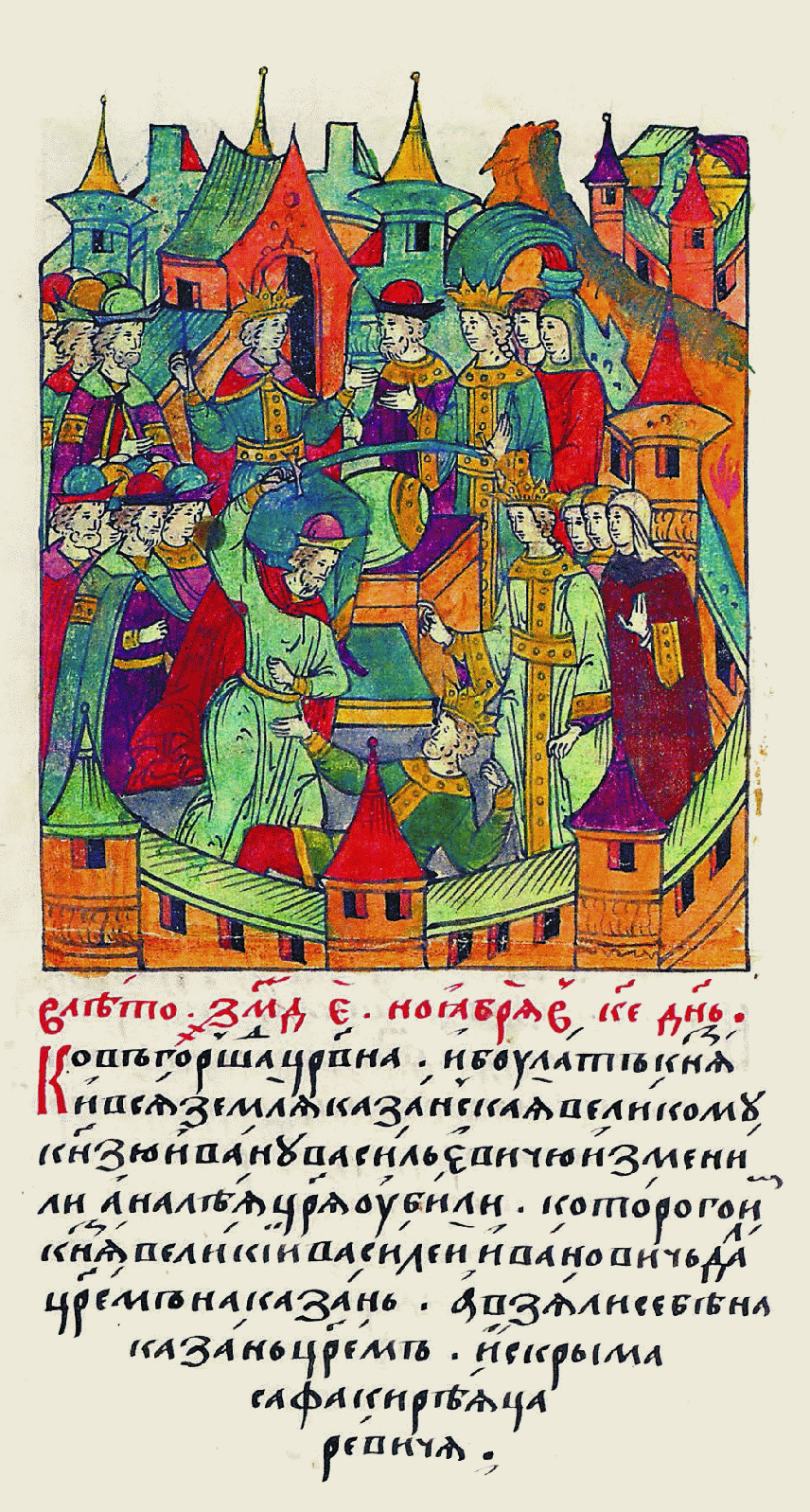

Khan of the Tatar Qasim Khanate
- Reign: 1519 – 1532
- Predecessor: Shahghali
- Successor: Shahghali

Khan of the Tatar Kazan Khanate
- Reign: 1532 – 1535
- Predecessor: Safa Giray of Kazan
- Successor: Safa Giray of Kazan
- Born: 1516; Kasimov
- Died: 25 September 1535 (aged 18–19); İske Qazan
- Spouse: Söyembikä
- Father: Shayex Allahiar

Dzhan-Ali (Volga Türki and Persian: جان علی; Russian: Джан-Али, Tatar: Җангали / Canğali; in Russian chronicles as Yanaley / Yenaley, Яналей, Еналей; 1516–1535) was ruler of the Khanate of Qasim in 1519–1532 and then Khanate of Kazan in 1532–1535. He was the son of Qasim khan Shaykh Allahyar (Şäyexäwliyär) (r. 1512-16) and younger brother of Qasim khan Shah-Ali (Şahğali) (r. 1515-19).

When Shah Ali moved to Kazan Jan Ali took the throne. The Qasim Khanate was a vassal state of Muscovy. Canghali as its ruler had close ties with Muscovy.

In 1532 Vasili III of Russia defeated Kazan, khan Safagäräy fled and the 16-year-old Canghali was brought in as a pro-Russian ruler of the bigger and generally independent Kazan Khanate. In 1533 Canghali married Söyembika, the daughter of Nogay nobleman. During his reign he was completely manipulated by Bulat Shirin (Bulat Şirin, /boo-LAHT shee-RREEN/) and queen Gawharshat (Gäwhärşat, /geh-w-ha-rr-SHAHT/), widow or sister of Moxammat Amin khan. During 1535 coup of Kazan nobility, he lost the throne and was exiled to Iske Qazan. Older sources (Howorth) say that he was killed.

== See also ==
- List of Qasim Khans
- List of Kazan khans

Preceded by Safa Giray	Khan of Kazan; 1532–1535	Succeeded by Safa Giray
