= Khan's Mosque =

Mosque in Kasimov, Russia

Coordinates: 54°56′00″N 41°23′49″E

- Ханская мечеть в Касимове
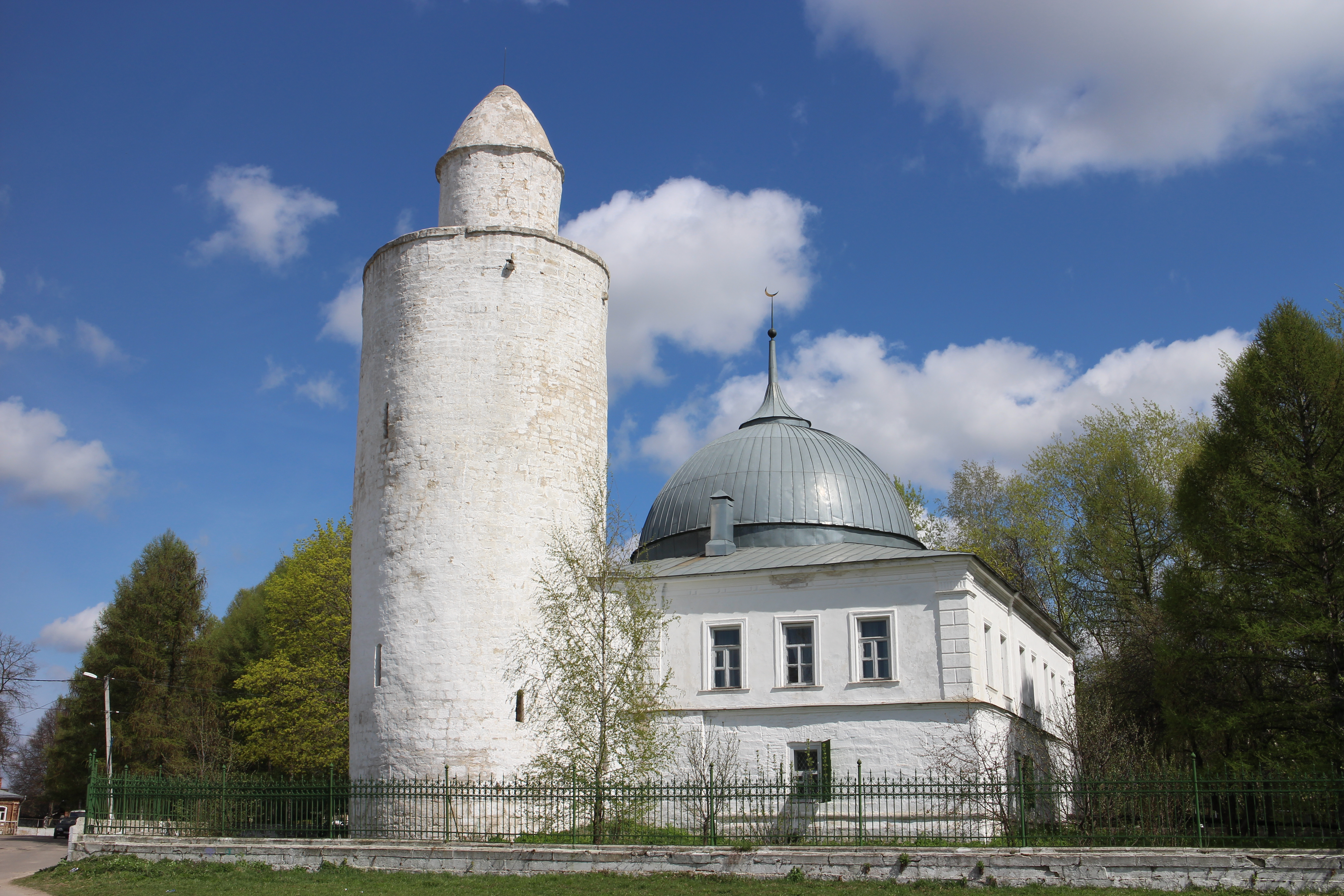

Religion
- Affiliation: Islam

Location
- Municipality: Kasimov
- State: Ryazan Oblast
- Country: Russia
- Interactive map of Khan's Mosque

Architecture
- Type: mosque
- Established: 1768

Specifications
- Dome: 1
- Minaret: 1

The Khan's Mosque (Russian: Ханская мечеть в Касимове) in Kasimov is the oldest mosque in Central Russia. It dates from the Qasim Khanate of the 15th and 16th centuries. According to Kadir Ali, the brick mosque was built by Shahghali at some point in the mid-16th century. Others believe that the mosque goes back to the reign of Qasim Khan. The original building was torn down at the behest of Peter the Great in 1702, but its wide stone minaret survives.

The existing mosque was erected next to the old minaret in 1768. The local Tatar nobles had a second storey added in 1835. A little closer to the Oka River is another local landmark, Shahghali's Mausoleum, from the mid-16th century. The Khan's Mosque has been designated a public museum since the 1930s.

== Architecture ==
The mosque's main building consists of two floors.

== See also ==
- Islam in Russia
- List of mosques in Russia
- List of mosques in Europe
