= Afghan Muhammad =

17th-century Qasim khan

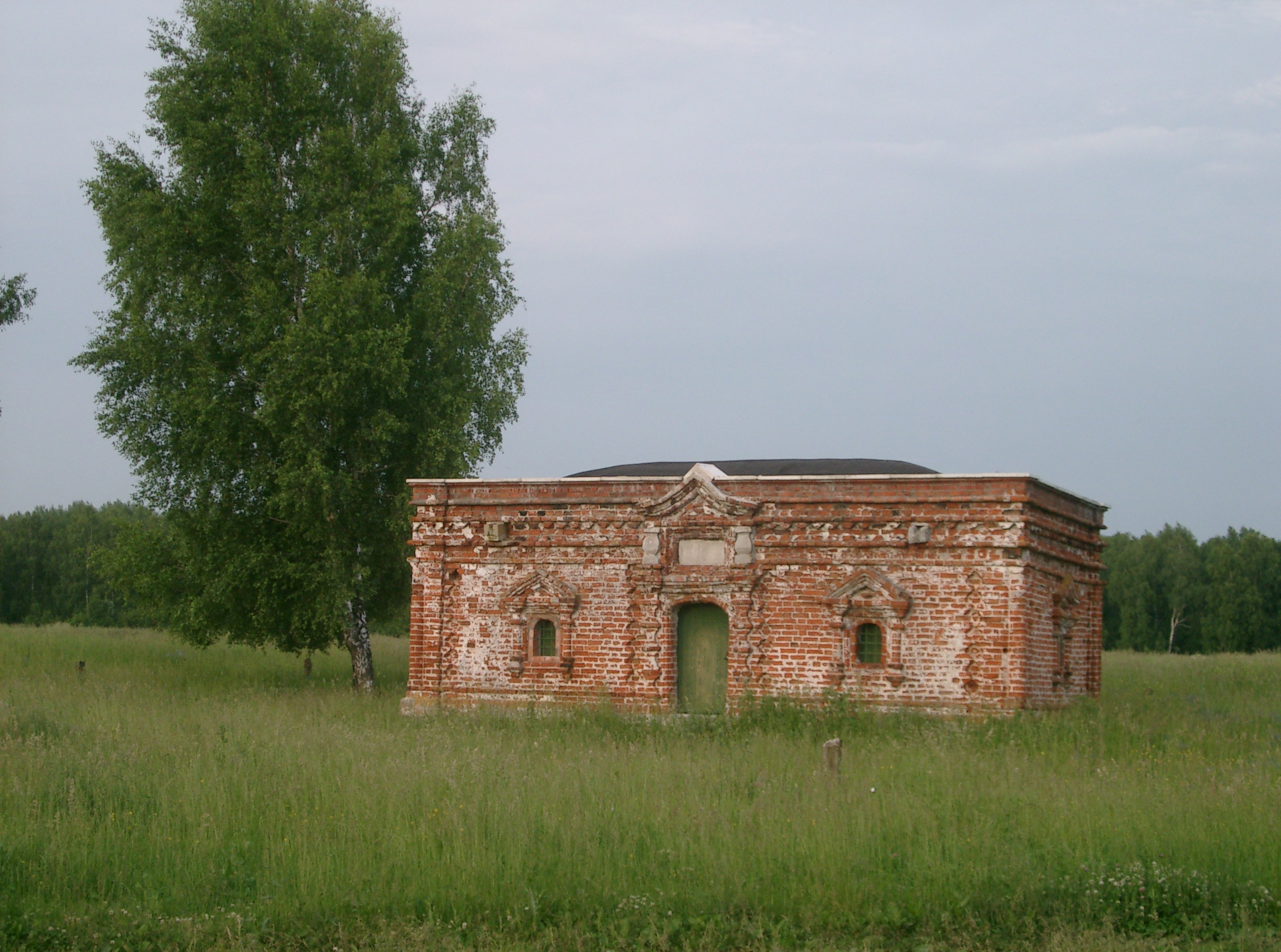
- Mausoleum of Afghan Moxammad, Kasimov
- Born: 1611
- Died: 1648 (aged 36–37); Moscow, Tsardom of Moscow
- Burial: Kasimov
- Wife: Altun-Khanum
- House: Shiban (Shaybanids)
- Father: Arab Muhammad Khan

Afghān Muḥammad (b. 1611 d. 1648) was the ruler of Qasim Khanate, 17th century.
