= Söyembikä of Kazan =

Tatar ruler

- Xanbikä of Kazan
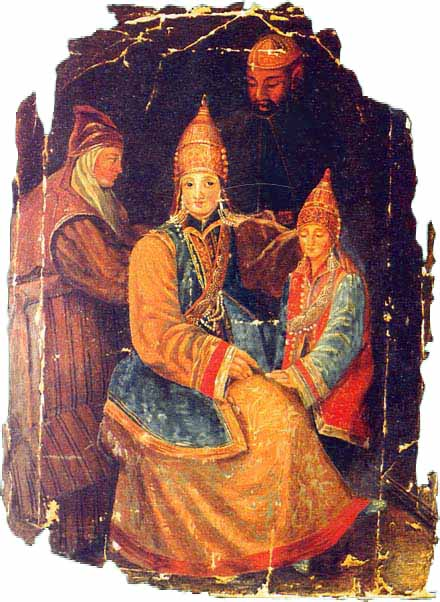
- Söyembikä with son Ütämeşgäräy
- Born: 1516
- Died: after 1553; Constantinople, Ottoman Empire
- Spouse: Cangali khan (1533–35); Safagäräy (1536–49); Şahğäli (after 1553)
- Issue: Ütämeşgäräy

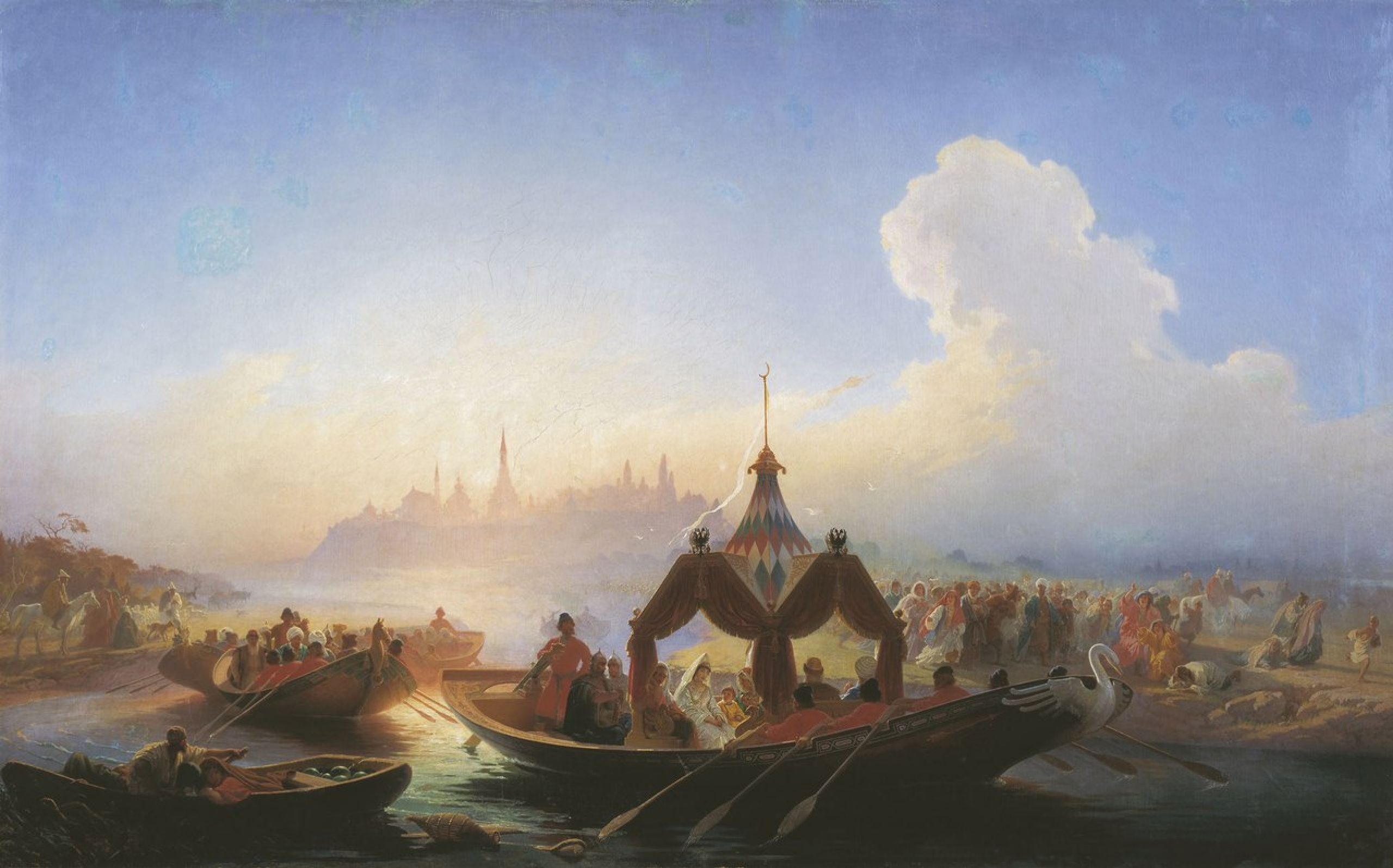
Captured Princess Söyembikä leaves Kazan, by Vasily Khudyakov.

Söyembikä (also spelled Söyenbikä, Sujumbike, pronounced [sœˌjœmbiˈkæ]; Cyrillic: Сөембикә) (1516 – after 1553) was a Nogai ruler, xanbikä. She served as regent of Kazan during the minority of her son from 1549 until 1551.

== Life ==
She was the daughter of Nogay nobleman Yosıf bäk and the wife of Canğäli (1533–35), Safagäräy (1536–49) and Şahğäli (after 1553). In 1549, she became regent during the minority of her son, Kazan khan Ütämeşgäräy.

In 1551, after the first partial conquest of the Khanate of Kazan by Ivan the Terrible she was forcibly moved to Moscow with her son and later married to Şahğäli, the Russia-imposed khan of the Qasim and Kazan Tatars.

=== Suicide legend ===
She is a national hero of Tatarstan. Her name is associated first of all with Söyembikä Tower, that Ivan the Terrible wanted to marry her, so she agreed that if he built her a tower made with seven tiers (one for each day of the week) then she would marry him. Ivan the Terrible supposedly finished the tower within the week, so Söyembikä went up to the top of the tower and after looking out at her beautiful home of Kazan she became so overwhelmed with emotion for her people that she couldn't bear to marry the tsar and jumped off. However, the true date of her death, and her gravesite, remains unknown.

== See also ==
- List of Kazan khans
