= Arslanghali =

Khan of Qasim from 1614 to 1627

Khan of the Tatar Qasim Khanate
- Reign: 1614 – 1627
- Predecessor: Eid al-Muhammad ibn Ondak Sultan
- Successor: Sayed Borhan
- Born: unknown
- Died: 1627
- Father: Ghali khan

Arslanghali Khan (Volga Türki and Persian: ارسلان ابن علی خان; died 1627) was a khan of the Qasim Khanate from 1614 to 1627, and a son of Ghali khan and a grandson of Kuchum. In 1598 he was captured by the Russians during Kuchum's final defeat. In the time of Troubles he with his father fought against the False Dmitriys. Supporting Mikhail Romanov, he became a khan in the vassal Qasim Khanate, but his rule was limited and rather formal: only the Muslims and Kasimov population obeyed him.

== Bibliography ==
- "Arıslanğäli/Арыслангали хан". Tatar Encyclopaedia (in Tatar). Kazan: The Republic of Tatarstan Academy of Sciences. Institution of the Tatar Encyclopaedia. 2002.
