= Safa Giray of Kazan =

Safa Giray

Khan of the Tatar Kazan Khanate (1st reign)
- Reign: 1524 – 1531
- Predecessor: Sahib I Giray
- Successor: Canghali

Khan of the Tatar Kazan Khanate (2nd reign)
- Reign: 1535 – 1546
- Predecessor: Canghali
- Successor: Shahghali

Khan of the Tatar Kazan Khanate (3rd reign)
- Reign: 1546 – 1549
- Predecessor: Shahghali
- Successor: Utameshgaray
- Born: 1510; Bağçasaray, Crimean Khanate
- Died: 1549 (aged 38–39); Kazan, Khanate of Kazan
- Spouse: Söyembikä of Kazan
- Issue: Utamesh
- Dynasty: Giray

Safa Giray (Crimean Tatar, Volga Türki, Persian, and Ottoman Turkish: صفا کرای) was three times khan of Kazan (1524–31, 1535–46, 1546–49). He was the nephew of the previous Kazan Khan Sahib Giray and brother of Moxammat Giray.

First reign 1524–31: In 1524 a large Russian army approached Kazan and Sahib Giray fled. His 13-year-old nephew Safa Giray took his place. The Russian siege of Kazan failed and they withdrew. In 1530 another Russian army burned part of Kazan and Safa Giray fled to Arsk. The matter was settled when a faction deposed Safa Giray and enthroned the pro-Russian Jan Ali.

Second reign 1535–46: Four years later, in 1535 the Kazan nobility expelled or killed the pro-Russian Jan Ali and Safa Giray returned to the throne. He married Jan Ali's wife or widow Söyembikä of Kazan. The pro-Russian faction wanted to enthrone Jan Ali's brother Shah Ali, but they were unsuccessful. The choice of an anti-Russian khan led to border fighting around Nizhny Novgorod. In 1537 or 1538 Safa Giray burned the outskirts of Murom and withdrew on the approach of a Russian army. In 1546 two Russian armies raided near Kazan and withdrew. In 1546 a Kazan faction revolted and Safa Giray fled to his father-in-law Yusuf of the Nogai horde. He was replaced by the pro-Russian Shahghali (Shah Ali).

Third reign 1546–49: Shah Ali soon found his position impossible and after a few months slipped out of town. Safa Giray returned with a Nogai army but Shah Ali's flight made the army unnecessary. Leaders of the pro-Russian faction fled. In late 1547 Ivan the Terrible in person led a winter campaign against Kazan, but an early thaw made the roads and rivers impassible, so he returned to Moscow. Part of the army continued, won a few battles and withdrew.

Safa Giray died in 1549. Reason of his death is unclear, but it is said that he was poisoned by his enemies. After his death his infant son Utamesh ascended the throne. His wife, Söyembikä became Regent.

== See also ==
- Giray dynasty
- List of Kazan khans

Preceded by Sahib Giray	Khan of Kazan; 1525–1532	Succeeded by Canghali
Preceded by Canghali	Khan of Kazan; 1535–1546	Succeeded by Shahgali
Preceded by Shahgali	Khan of Kazan; 1546–1549	Succeeded by Utamesh
