= Sayed Borhan =

Khan of Qasim from 1627 to 1679

Khan of the Tatar Qasim Khanate
- Reign: 1627–1679
- Predecessor: Arslanghali
- Successor: Fatima Soltan
- Born: c. 1624
- Died: c. 1680
- Father: Arslanghali
- Mother: Fatima Soltan

Sayed Borhan Khan (Volga Türki and Persian: سید برهان خان; c. 1624 – c. 1680) was Khan of the Qasim Khanate from 1627 to 1679.

== Reign ==
He was a son of Arslanghali and Fatima Soltan. After the death of his father, he was crowned as the khan of Qasim. Sayed Borhan's regents were Fatima Soltan and her father Agha Muhammad Shah Quli Sayyid. During his reign, the Khanate was totally placed under the control of Moscow and Russian authorities enforced Christianization. In 1679, Sayed Borhan abdicated and was baptized as Vasili.

Preceded by Arslanghali	Khan of Qasim; 1627-1679	Succeeded by Fatima Soltan
