= İske Qazan =

İske Qazan (literally: Old Kazan; Cyrillic: Иске Казан), was a Bolghar-Tatar city in the 13-16th centuries, situated on the banks of the Kazanka River in the Kazan artı or Zakazanye region, in what is today the Russian Federation republic of Tatarstan.

In 18th century Tatar literature, İske Kazan was said to have been founded by the brothers Altınbäk and Ğälimbäk during Mongol invasion of Volga Bulgaria.

In the 13-14th centuries the city was one of the political and economic centres of Kazan artı. After raids by Russian armies in 1376 and 1399, the city's importance declined. In 1535, the exiled king Canğäli khan lived in the city, where he probably died. In 1552 İske Kazan was ruined by Russian troops.

Today the Urıs Urmatı and Qamay ruins are the ruins of İske Kazan.
