= Söyembikä Tower =

Tower of the kremlin of Kazan, Tatarstan, Russia

Coordinates: 55°47′47″N 49°06′29″E

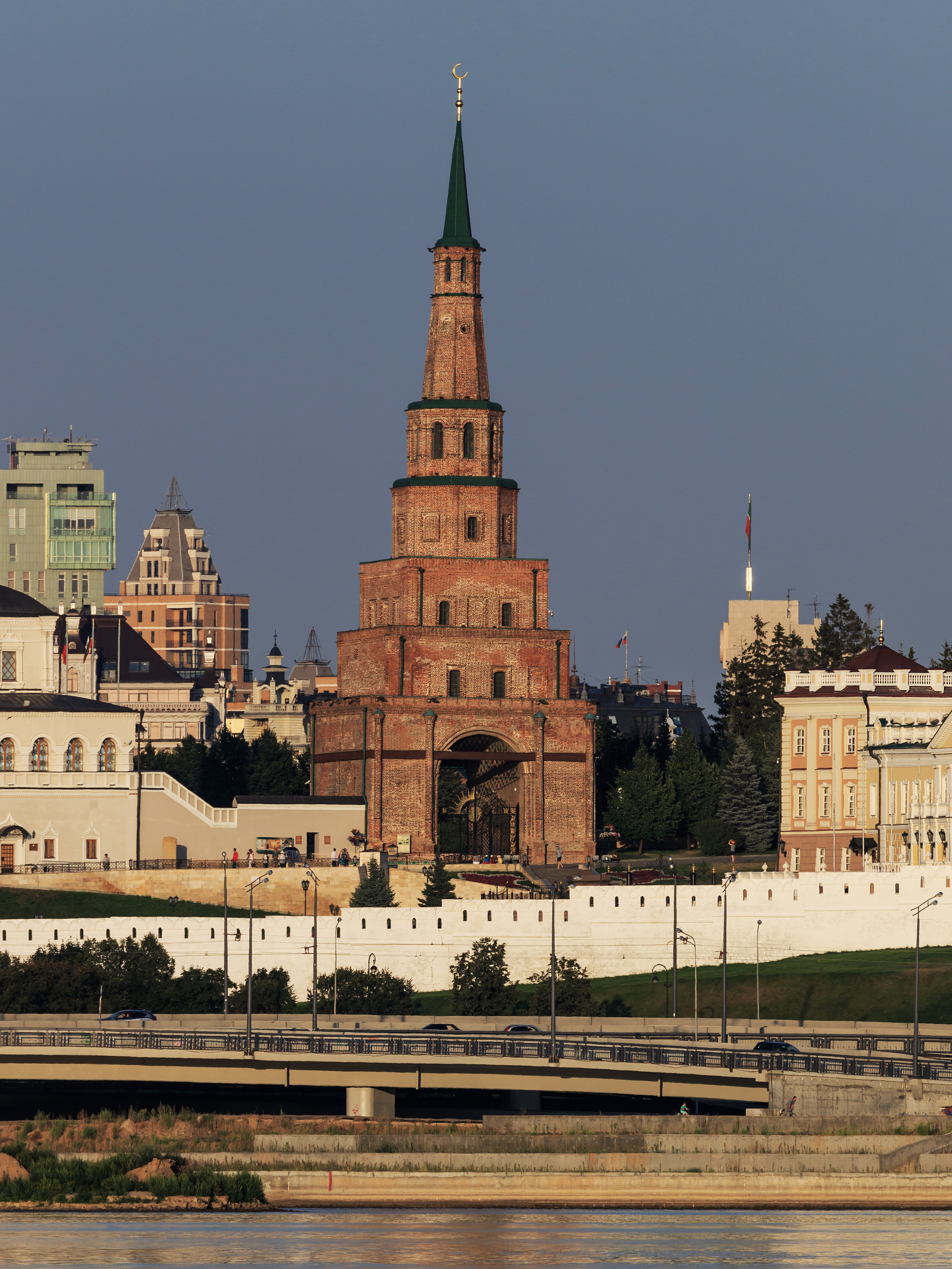
A side view

Söyembikä Tower (Tatar: Сөембикә манарасы, romanized: Söyembikä manarası; Russian: Ба́шня Сююмбикэ́, romanized: Bashnya Syuyumbike), also called the Khan's Mosque, is probably the most familiar landmark and architectural symbol of Kazan.

Once the highest structure of that city's kremlin, it used to be one of the so-called leaning towers. By 1990s, the inclination was 198 centimeters (78 in). Diverse stabilization methods were used to straighten the tower in the 1930s and 1990s, and it no longer leans.

The tower's construction date is enshrouded in mystery. Several scholars date its construction to the turn of the 18th century, when tiered towers were exceedingly popular in Russia. Some scholars believe that the tower may date further back than the 18th century.

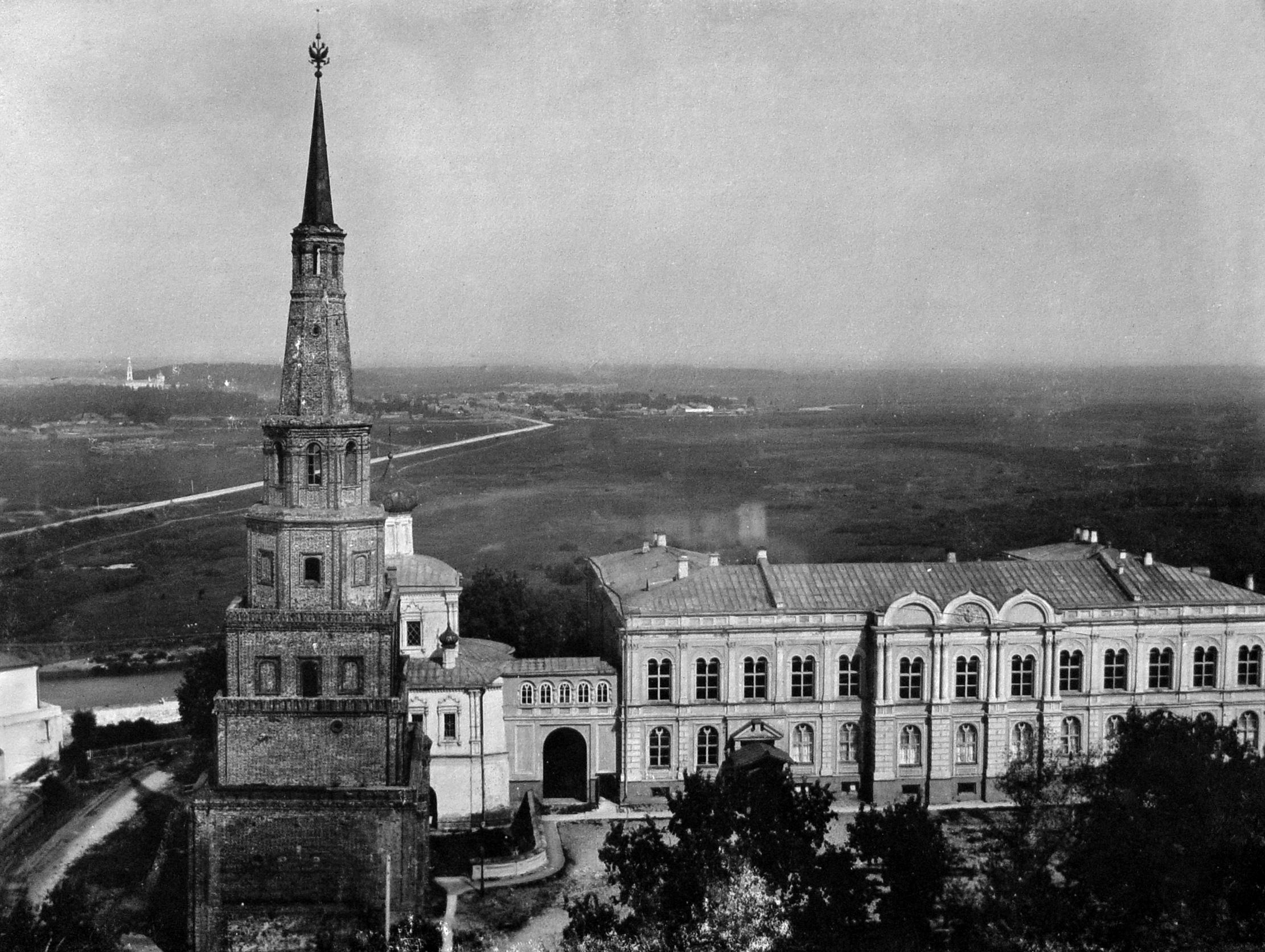
The tower during the Russian Empire

A legend postulates that the tower was built more than a century earlier by Ivan the Terrible's artisans in just a week's time. As the legend goes, the Kazan queen Söyembikä threw herself down from the highest tier, hence the name.

According to scholar Ravil Bukharaev, the need for the tower, which was built as a military watchtower is questionable. He stated that the region was in relative peace at the time and another existing tower already existed next to the Blagoveshchensky Cathedral. He adds that if the tower was built in the 18th century by the Russians, it would have proved superfluous and expensive to construct another for such a purpose. Additionally, he cites the Islamic influence of the tower's architecture as being uncharacteristic if it was of Russian origin. Supporters of the theory point out that the only similar structures were built in Central Asia, which was politically and culturally connected with the derelict Khanate of Kazan. Several points possibly add validity to this theory: the size of the masonry, the absence of documentary evidence supporting Russian building, the respect paid to the tower by the local Tatar population, and so forth.

In the Imperial period, the tower used to be topped with a double-headed eagle, which the Bolsheviks replaced with a red star. It is currently crowned with a Muslim crescent. In the early twentieth century, the architect Alexey Shchusev reproduced the structure's outline in the Kazan Rail Station of Moscow.

The tower was depicted on the reverse of the Russian 1000-ruble note issued in 2023. A controversy was sparked by the Orthodox Church, as the tower was depicted with a crescent on top while the former building of the Dvortsovaya church lacked a cross. As a result, the release of the note was halted and a new design was announced.
