= Utameshgaray of Kazan =

Khan of the Kazan Khanate

Utameshgaray
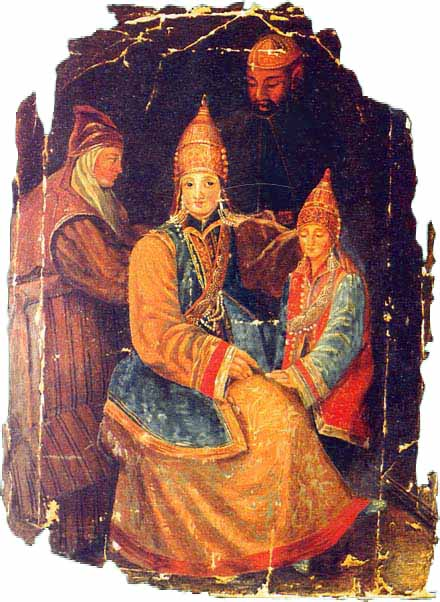
- 16th-century portrait of Söyembikä with Utameshgaray

Khan of the Tatar Kazan Khanate
- Reign: 1549–1551
- Predecessor: Safa Giray
- Successor: Shahghali
- Born: 1546
- Died: 21 June 1566 (aged 19–20)
- Dynasty: Giray
- Father: Safa Giray
- Mother: Söyembikä

Ütämeşgäräy (Note: Volga Turki, Crimean Tatar and Persian: اوتمیش گرای, pronounced [ytæmeʃɡæˈræɪ]; also spelled Utamish, Ütämeş, Ötemiş Giray, Utyamysh; also anglicized as Ötemish Giray) (1546–1566) was Khan of the Kazan Khanate from 1549 to 1551. He was the son of Safagäräy and Söyembikä.

Upon his father's death he was crowned Khan at the age of two with his mother serving as regent. Ivan the Terrible took advantage of this situation and sent an army which besieged Kazan in February 1550. An early thaw caused Ivan to pull back 29 kilometres (18 mi) and build the fort of Sviyazhsk from which his army raided the surrounding country. The peace faction in Kazan came to power and accepted the Russian candidate Shah Ali as khan, turning over Utameshgaray and his mother to the Russians. Shortly after this, the patriotic faction regained power, expelled Shah Ali and brought in Yadegar Mokhammad of Kazan who was khan when the Russians conquered Kazan in 1552.

In January 1553, Utameshgaray was baptized as a Christian, taking the name Alexander. He died at the age of 20 and is buried in Moscow. His mother was later married to Shah Ali.

== Notes ==
Preceded by Safa Giray	Khan of Kazan; 1549–1551	Succeeded by Shahgali
