= List of Qasim khans =

This is a list of rulers of the Qasim Khanate.

== Main list with full names ==
This is a list of Khans (Leaders), Sultans (Princes), and Begums (Queens) who ruled in Qasim Khanate (Russian: Kasimov Khanate (1452-1681)) from five dynasties.

1. Kazan Dynasty (Green)
2. Crimean dynasty (Blue)
3. Astrakhan Dynasty (Grey)
4. Kazakh Dynasty (Brown)
5. Sibir dynasty (Pink)

Titular Name	Personal Name	Reign
Khan خان; Sultan سلطان	Qasim ibn Ulugh Muhammad قاسم ابن الغ محمد	1445 - 1468 C.E.
Sultan سلطان	Daniyal ibn Qasim دانیال ابن قاسم	1468 - 1486 C.E.
Khan خان	Nur Daulat ibn Haji Girai نور دولت ابن حاجی غرائی	1486 – 1491 C.E.
Sultan سلطان	Satylghan ibn Nur Daulat ساتیلغان ابن نور دولت	1491 – 1506 C.E.
Sultan سلطان	Janai ibn Nur Daulat جانائی ابن نور دولت	1506 – 1512 C.E.
Khan خان	Shaykh Allahyar ibn Bakhtiyar Sultan ibn Küchük Muhammad شیخ اللہ یار ابن بختیار سلطان ابن کوچک محمد	1512 - 1516 C.E.
Khan خان	Shah Ali ibn Shaykh Allahyar شاه علی ابن شیخ اللہ یار	1516 - 1519 C.E.
Khan خان	Jan Ali ibn Shaykh Allahyar جان علی ابن شیخ اللہ یار	1519 - 1531 C.E.
Khan خان	Shah Ali ibn Shaykh Allahyar شاه علی ابن شیخ اللہ یار	1535 - 1567 C.E.
Khan خان	Sain Bulat ibn Beg Bulat a.k.a. (Simeon Bekbulatovich) ساین بولاط ابن بیگ بولاط	1567 - 1573 C.E.
Khan خان	Mustafa Ali ibn Abdullah ibn Aq Kubek ibn Murtada Beg مصطفی علی ابن عبد اللہ ابن اق قبق ابن مرتضی بیگ	1584 - 1590 C.E.
Khan خان	Eid al-Muhammad ibn Ondak Sultan عید المحمد ابن عوندک سلطان; Uraz Muhammad اوراز محمد	1600 - 1610 C.E.
Khan خان	Arslan ibn Ali ibn Kuchum ibn Murtada ibn Ibak Khan ارسلان ابن علی ابن کوچم ابن مرتضی ابن عبک خان	1614 - 1627 C.E.
Sultan سلطان	Sayyid Burhan ibn Arslan سید برہان ابن ارسلان	1627 - 1679 C.E.
Khanum خانم; Begum بیگم	Fatima Soltan فاطمہ سلطان	1679 - 1681 C.E.
Feodor III of Russia, the Tsar of Russia allows abolition of the Khanate in 1681 C.E.

== Second list with short biographies ==
1. Kazan Khan: Ulugh Muhammad: several times Khan of the Golden Horde, after final expulsion in 1438 founded Khanate of Kazan. 1445 defeated Vasily II (below), died same year.
2. Qasim Khan 1452-1469 son of above. Following his father’s victory at the Battle of Suzdal (1445), in which Vasily II of Moscow was captured and ransomed, he and his brother Yakub went to Muscovy to supervise the treaty. He entered Russian service and was given the fiefs of Zvenigorod in 1442 and Kasimov in 1452. In 1449 defeated Sayid Ahmad I near Moscow and recovered his booty. Around 1450 he fought Vasily’s enemy Dmitry Shemyaka. In 1467 he claimed the throne of Kazan, but he and his Russian friends were defeated.
3. Daniyal or Daniyar 1469-86, son of above. Fought Novgorod in 1471 and 1477. He was not allowed to take prisoners because he was not a Christian. Repelled Ahmed Khan bin Küchük in 1472. Received tribute from Russian princes.
4. Nur Devlet 1486-90. Because Daniyal had no surviving sons, Kasimov was given to Nur-Devlet who had been three times Khan of Crimea. 1476:driven from Crimea, fled to Lithuania, 1479:entered Russian service, 1480: captured Sarai, 1486: given Kasimov, 1487-90: fought Tatars, 1490: throne passed to his son, 1503: died after long illness.
5. Satylghan ibn Nur Daulat 1491-1506, son of above. 1491: Kasimov, Russia, Kazan and Crimea fought the Great Horde. 1502: Great Horde came to end. 1501-03: imprisoned in Moscow. Fought Kazan in the year of his death. Received tribute from Ryazan.
6. Janai 1506-12. Brother of above. Fought Kazan and Lithuania.
7. Sheikh Auliyar 1512-16. It is not clear why the above family lost the throne. He was the son of Bakhtiar Sultan, a brother of Ahmed Khan bin Küchük (the man who lost control of Russia). When the Horde fell in 1502 he fled to Russia. Fought Lithuania. Little Information.
8. Shah Ali first reign, 1515-19. Son of above, enthroned at age 11. In 1519 made Khan of Kazan by Russians and Kazan faction. Later: 1521: expelled from Kazan, 1523: fought Kazan, 1526 seen by Sigismund von Herberstein, 1533 exiled to north for contacts with Kazan, 1536 forgiven and soon back in Kasimov.
9. Jan Ali 1519-32 brother of above, 1521 retained throne when his brother returned, 1528 fought Lithuania, 1532 Khan of Kazan, 1535 lost Kazan
10. Shah Ali, second (long) reign, 1537-67. 5-year Interregnum(?), 1537-48: Several campaigns against Kazan, 1546 briefly held Kazan, 1552 final capture of Kazan. 1550s,60s fought in west or guarded border, died childless.
11. 0 Sain Bulat 1567-73. His father was the Nogai Bek-Bulat, a great-grandson of Ahmed Khan bin Küchük. His mother was the sister of Maria Temryukovna, the Kabardian princess who married Ivan the Terrible. He and his father entered Russian service in 1558. In 1561 he accompanied Maria to her wedding with Ivan. Sher Ali dying childless, Sain Bulat became Khan of Kasimov. Fought in Livonian War. In 1573 he was baptized and gave up the throne. Later, in 1575, Ivan, in an apparent fit of madness, made him briefly Czar of Russia. Next year Ivan returned to the throne and made him Grand Duke of Tver. Deprived of his fief by Boris Godunov and possibly blinded, he became a monk and died in 1616.
12. 1. Mustapha Ali 1584-90. Interregnum(?). Little information. He fought in the west in the 1570s. He was a grandson of Aq Kubek of Astrakhan.
13. 2 Uraz Mukhammed 1600-1610 Interregnum(?). Grandson of Kazakh Khan Shigai. In 1587, while serving under Kuchum he was captured by the Russians and entered their service. Fought Swedes and Crimeans, made khan in 1600 (after interregnum?). 1608 joined False Dmitry II, 1610 Kasimov captured. Dmitry, hearing that Uraz was planning to murder him, killed him first. Dmitry was then killed in revenge by Peter Arslanovich Urusov.
14. 3 Arslan 1614-27 Interregnum(?). Grandson of Kuchum, captured as a child. At end of Time of Troubles made khan after supporting winning side. 1621: khan's legal powers reduced. No important events recorded.
15. 4 Sayed Borhan 1627-79, son of above, 1627: khan at age 3, 1636: at age 12 seen by Adam Olearius, 1653: became Christian but retained throne in violation of the custom that Khans must be Muslim. According to Howorth, in 1656 fought Swedes, 1678 fought in Ukraine. Very long reign, few important events.
16. 5 Fatima Soltan 1679-81, mother of above, ruled from her son’s death until her death, when the Khanate was abolished.

== Sources ==
- Henry Howorth, History of the Mongols, 1880, part 2, pp. 429–438.
- V. V. Velyaminov-Zernov, Issledovanie o Kasimovckikh Tsaryakh i Tsarevichakh, Saint Petersburg, four parts, 1863-1877.
