= Simeon Bekbulatovich =

Russian figurehead ruler (died 1616)

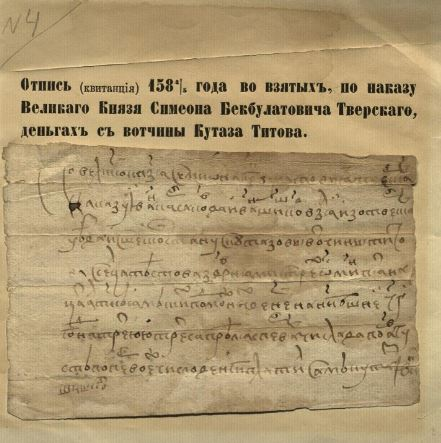

Grand Prince of all Russia
- Reign: October 1575 – September 1576
- Predecessor: Ivan IV
- Successor: Ivan IV

Khan of the Tatar Qasim Khanate
- Reign: 1567–1573
- Predecessor: Shahghali
- Successor: Mustafa Ali

Grand Prince of Tver
- Reign: 1576–1585
- Monarch: Ivan IV
- Died: 15 January [O.S. 5 January] 1616; Moscow, Russia
- Burial: Simonov Monastery
- Spouse: Anastasia Mstislavskaya
- House: Borjigin
- Religion: Russian Orthodox prev. Islam

Simeon Bekbulatovich (Russian: Симеон Бекбулатович; born Sain-Bulat; (Note: Turki/Kypchak and Persian: ساین پولاد Russian: Саин-Булат) died 15 January [O.S. 5 January] 1616) was a Russian statesman of Tatar origin who briefly served as the figurehead ruler of Russia from 1575 to 1576. He was a descendant of Genghis Khan.

He was born into a Muslim family and served as the khan of the Khanate of Qasim before converting to Christianity and becoming an aide to Ivan IV of Russia. He participated in the Livonian War as a commander of the main regiment (bolshoy polk) of the Russian army. In 1575, Ivan made Simeon the grand prince of all Russia, though Ivan remained the de facto ruler and returned to his throne a year later. Subsequently, Simeon became the grand prince of Tver and Torzhok (1576–1585). He went blind (or was blinded) in 1595 and was allegedly tonsured as a Christian monk under the monastic name Stefan in 1606.

== Biography ==
Simeon was the son of Bek-Bulat, and a great-grandson of Ahmed Khan bin Küchük, the khan of the Golden Horde. The first mention of Simeon is in the Supplement to the Nikon Chronicle in 1561 when he came to Moscow in the entourage of his aunt, Kochenei (baptized as Maria), when she married Ivan IV that year. The earliest evidence he was the khan of Qasim comes from a statement from the Russian ambassador to Constantinople, Ivan Novosiltsev, to the Ottoman sultan Selim II in 1570.

In 1575 (either September or October), Ivan IV appointed Simeon as the grand prince of all Russia, and styled himself merely as "Ivan of Moscow". Historians have a number of opinions concerning why Ivan did this. According to the most popular theory by contemporary diplomat Giles Fletcher, the Elder, Ivan aimed to confiscate the land that belonged to monasteries without attracting the ire of the Church. Simeon issued the decrees of confiscation instead of Ivan, while Ivan pretended to disagree. During his one-year "rule" in the Moscow Kremlin, Simeon married Anastasia Mstislavskaya, the great-great-granddaughter of Ivan III.

In September 1576, Simeon stepped down as the grand prince of all Russia as Ivan returned to the throne, and was given the title of grand prince of Tver and Torzhok. In 1585, Tsar Feodor Ivanovich removed his title as grand prince of Tver and Torzhok, and confined him to his estate at Kushalov. In 1595, Simeon went blind. According to Jacques Margeret, Simeon blamed Spanish wine that Boris Godunov sent him for his birthday. When Boris was elected tsar in 1598, he required those at the court to sign a loyalty oath, which prohibited them from recognizing Simeon as tsar or corresponding with him. False Dmitry I required Simeon to be tonsured at the Kirillo-Belozersky Monastery, where he took the monastic name Stefan on 3 April 1606. When Vasilii Shuiskii was elected tsar, he ordered the elder Stefan taken to the Solovki Monastery on 29 May 1606.

In 1612, as the result of a decree issued by Prince Dmitry Pozharsky and "on the advice of all the land" (Zemsky Sobor), Stefan was returned to the Kirillo-Belozersky Monastery. Under Tsar Mikhail Fedorovich, he returned to Moscow and resided in the Simonov Monastery until he died in 1616. He was buried in the Simonov Monastery next to his wife, who had died on 7 June 1607, after having been veiled as the nun Alexandra.

== Ancestry ==
Ancestors of Simeon Bekbulatovich

8. Ahmed Khan bin Küchük
4. Bahadur Khan
9. Badi' al-Jamal
2. Bek-Bulat
1. Simeon Bekbulatovich
12. Idar of Kabardia
6. Temruqo
3. Altynchach

== Notes ==
Simeon Bekbulatovich Borjigin Died: 5 January 1616
Regnal titles
Preceded by Ivan IV	Tsar of All the Russias; 1575 – 1576	Succeeded by Ivan IV
