= Shah-Ali =

16th century Tatar Khan of Qasim and Kazan Khanates

Shah-Ali Şahğali
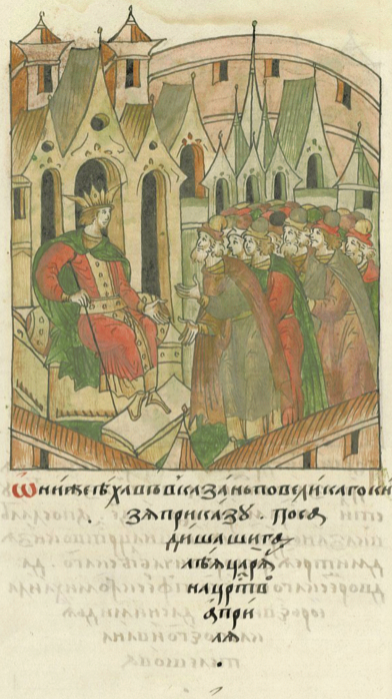
- Depiction of Shah-Ali, miniature from the Illustrated Chronicle of Ivan the Terrible

Khan of the Tatar Qasim Khanate (1st reign)
- Reign: 1516 – 1519
- Predecessor: Shaykh Allahyar
- Successor: Canghali of Kazan

Khan of the Tatar Kazan Khanate (1st reign)
- Reign: 1518 – 1521
- Predecessor: Möxämmädämin of Kazan
- Successor: Sahib I Giray

Khan of the Tatar Qasim Khanate (2nd reign)
- Reign: 1535 – 1567
- Predecessor: Canghali of Kazan
- Successor: Sain-Bulat

Khan of the Tatar Kazan Khanate (2nd reign)
- Reign: 1546
- Predecessor: Safa Giray of Kazan
- Successor: Safa Giray of Kazan

Khan of the Tatar Kazan Khanate (3rd reign)
- Reign: 1551 – 1552
- Predecessor: Utameshgaray of Kazan
- Successor: Yadegar Mokhammad of Kazan
- Born: 1505; Surozhik
- Died: 1567 (aged 61–62); Kasimov
- Burial: 4 February 1567
- Spouse: Fatima; Söyembikä
- Issue: none
- House: Qasim khans (Borjigin)
- Father: Sheikh Awliyar (Şəyexawliər soltan)
- Mother: Shah Sultan
- Religion: Islam

Shah-Ali (Volga Türki and Persian: شاه علی, or Shahghali; Russian: Шах-Али; Tatar: Шаһгали / Şahğali; also known as Shig-Aley; Russian: Шиг-Алей; 1505–1567) was a khan of the Qasim Khanate and the Khanate of Kazan. He ruled the Qasim Khanate for much of his life and three times tried to rule the Khanate of Kazan, which was independent until its conquest by Muscovy in 1552. He also ruled the town of Kasimov as a vassal of the Russians. He was the son of the Qasim Khan Sheikh Auliyar (reigned 1512–16) and grandson of Bakhtiar Sultan, a brother of Ahmed Khan bin Küchük (the Golden Horde ruler who lost control of Russia). One of his wives was the unfortunate Söyembikä of Kazan. He died childless in 1567 and was succeeded by Sain Bulat. He is described as physically repulsive and too fat to be a soldier, but a man of sound judgement. Shah-Ali was a direct descendant of Jochi Khan, the eldest son of Genghis Khan.

== Biography ==
Shahghali came to the throne in 1516 at age 11 upon his father’s death. There is little information about this period. When he moved to Kazan his brother Jan Ali became khan of Kasimov.

1519–21: First Kazan. The house of Ulugh Mohammad having died out, there was talk of bringing in someone from the Crimean Khanate, but Russia managed to impose their vassal Shahghali. He was disliked as a Russian vassal and his violence toward his opponents only made things worse. An embassy went to Crimea and brought back Sahib I Giray (reigned 1521–25), the brother of Crimean khan Mehmed I Giray. He entered Kazan with no difficulty and Shahghali was arrested. Shahghali was soon released, but given few provisions and had difficulty making his way to Russian territory.

1521–47: Russian exile: When Shahghali reached Russia he was kept in honorable exile and his brother Jan Ali retained Kasimov. Sigismund von Herberstein met him in 1526. In 1533 he was accused of intrigue with Kazan and exiled to Belozersk and released in 1535.

1537–46: Second Kasimov: There is little documentation for this period.

1546: Second Kazan: in 1546 Russia defeated Kazan, khan Safa Girai fled, and the peace party accepted Shahghali as khan. He arrived with 3000 Kasimov troops and several Russian princes. Within a few weeks his troops were massacred and it was clear that he was a prisoner in his own palace, although there was no attempt to dethrone him. After some weeks of this he held a banquet, got everyone drunk and slipped out of the palace before anyone knew he was gone. The man who helped him escape was executed.

1546–51 Third Kasimov: Shahghali returned to Kasimov and in 1547-51 was involved in several attacks on Kazan.

1551–52 Third Kazan: Now greatly weakened, Kazan accepted Shahghali as khan. The previous Khan's widow (Soyembika) and her son were turned over to the Russians and thousands of Russian captives were released. The people would not accept their near-conquest and he could not manage the conflict between his position as both a Russian vassal and ruler of an independent khanate. He killed some three thousand of his opponents, but this made things worse. Russia sent an ambassador suggesting that Russian troops enter the town to restore order, but he refused to surrender his city to unbelievers. A second embassy demanded his deposition. Instead he fled the town for a third time and returned to Kasimov.

1552–67 Fourth Kasimov. Shahghali took part in the final Russian conquest of Kazan in 1552. He was visited by Anthony Jenkinson in 1558.

In 1559 he participated in the Livonian War as commander of the Russian avant-garde, and besieged Narva and Pärnu.

In 1562 he defended Polock and in 1564-1565 defended Velikie Luki on the Russian border. He died childless in 1567.

== See also ==
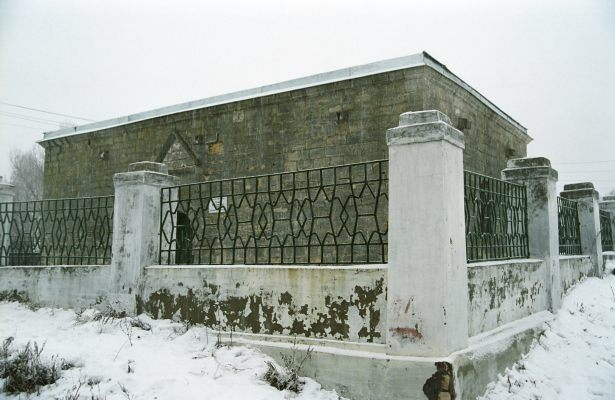
Mausoleum of Shahghali at Kasimov

- List of Kazan khans
- List of Qasim khans

== Sources ==
- Henry Hoyle Howorth, History of the Mongols, 1880, Part 2, pp 433–35(Kasimov); pp 385–86, 403–405, 410–412 (Kazan)

Preceded by Moxammat Amin	Khan of Kazan; 1518–1521	Succeeded by Sahib Giray
Preceded by Safa Giray	Khan of Kazan; 1546	Succeeded by Safa Giray
Preceded by Utamesh	Khan of Kazan; 1551–1552	Succeeded by Yadegar Moxammad
