= Qasim Khan =

Khan of Qasim from 1452 to 1469

Khan of the Tatar Qasim Khanate
- Reign: 1452 – 1469
- Predecessor: None
- Successor: Daniyal ibn Qasim
- Died: 1469
- Father: Ulugh Muhammad

Qasím Khan (Volga Türki and Persian: قاسم خان; also known as Qasim of Kasimov; died 1469) was the first khan of the Tatar Qasim Khanate, from 1452 until his death in 1469. He was the son of the Kazan khan Oluğ Möxämmäd.

== Life ==
He participated in the battles of Belyov in 1437, and of Suzdal in 1445. After the battle of Suzdal, he and his brother Yaqub were sent to Moscow to control the results of the treaty. He stayed at the palace of Vasily II of Moscow to serve him; when his father died in 1445, the throne of Kazan went to his elder brother Mäxmüd, which may have something to do with his decision to enter Russian service.

In 1449, at the Pakhra River near Moscow, he defeated the troops of Sayid Ahmad I, the khan of the Great Horde, that came to conquer Muscovy.

In 1447–1453, he supported Vasily in his struggle against Dmitry Shemyaka. In 1452, Vasily II granted him a principality in Ryazan as a hereditary estate, and Kasimov city. Those lands were designated the Qasim Khanate.

During the 1467–1469 war, the Russians attempted to make him the khan of Kazan. In 1469, he was succeeded by his son Daniyal.

== Sources ==
- Henry Hoyle Howorth, History of the Mongols, 1880, Part 2, pp 429–230
