= Kasimov =

Town in Ryazan Oblast, Russia

Kasimov Касимов
- Town
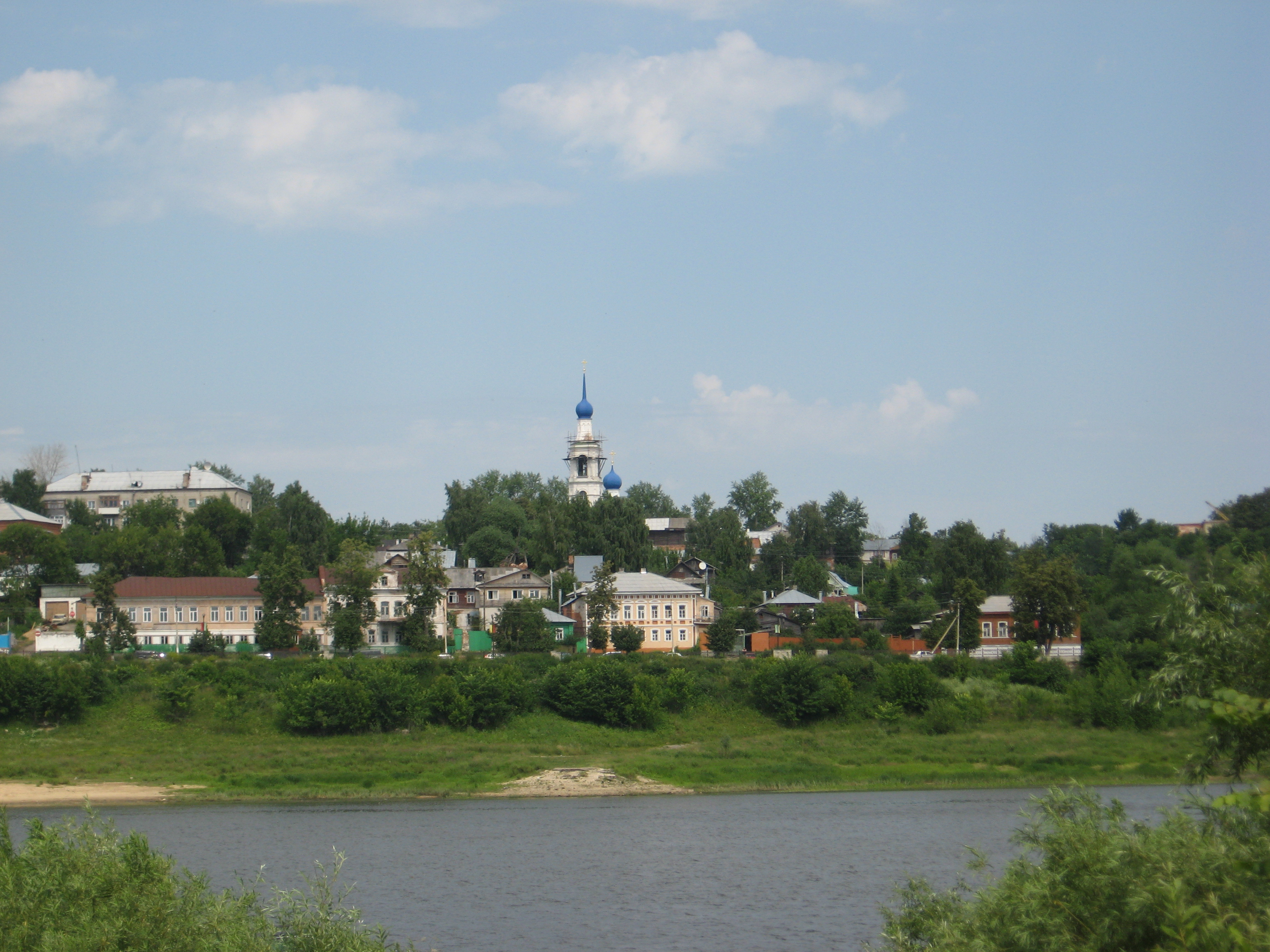
- The Oka River in Kasimov

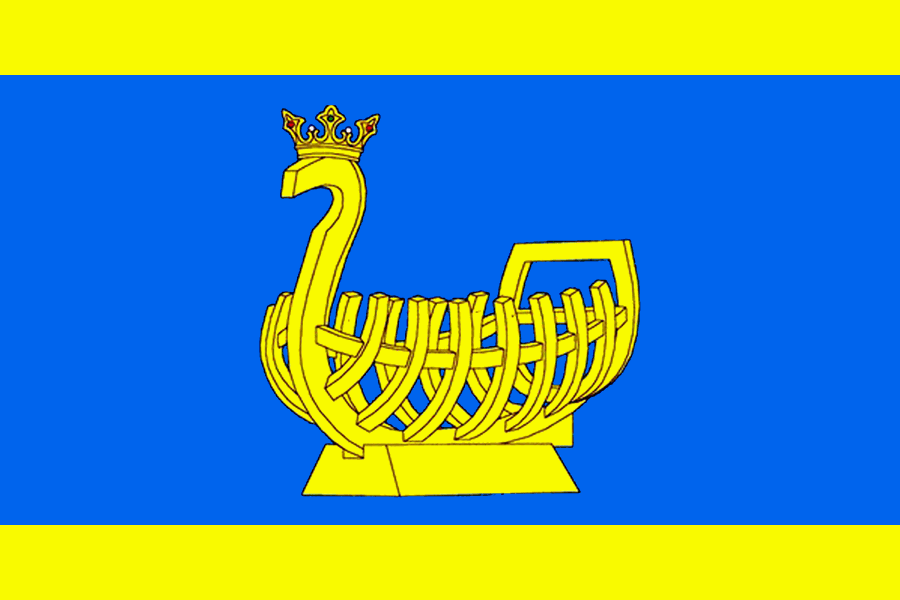
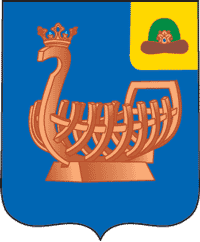
- Flag Coat of arms
- Interactive map of Kasimov
- Location of Kasimov Kasimov (Ryazan Oblast)
- Coordinates: 54°56′N 41°24′E
- Country: Russia
- Federal subject: Ryazan Oblast
- Founded: 1152
- Elevation: 100 m (330 ft)

Population (2010 Census)
  - Total: 33,491
  - Estimate (2023): 27,821 (−16.9%)

Administrative status
  - Subordinated to: town of oblast significance of Kasimov
  - Capital of: Kasimovsky District, town of oblast significance of Kasimov

Municipal status
  - Urban okrug: Kasimov Urban Okrug
  - Capital of: Kasimov Urban Okrug, Kasimovsky Municipal District
- Time zone: UTC+3 (MSK)
- Postal code: 3913xx
- Dialing code: +7 49131
- OKTMO ID: 61705000001
- Website: www.kasimov-gorod.ru

Kasimov (Russian: Каси́мов; Tatar: Касыйм;, Ханкирмән Latinized : Kasıym, Hankirmən, historically Gorodets Meshchyorsky, Novy Nizovoy) is a town in Ryazan Oblast, Russia, located on the left bank of the Oka River. Population: 33,491 (2010 census); 35,816 (2002 census); 37,521 (1989 Soviet census); 17,000 (1910).

== History ==
The first population of this area was a Finnic tribe called the Meshchyora, later assimilated by Russians and Tatars. The town was founded in 1152 by the Vladimir-Suzdal ruler Yuri Dolgorukiy as Grodets, then Gorodets Meschyorsky (Городец Мещёрский).

In 1376, the town was destroyed by the Mongols, but was soon rebuilt as Novy Nizovoy (Новый Низовой). After the Battle of Suzdal in 1445 (in which Grand Duke Vasily II was taken prisoner), the Meschyora lands were given to Oluğ Möxämmäd, Khan of Kazan Khanate as a ransom for the sovereign's life.

In 1452, Great Duke Vasily II of the Grand Duchy of Moscow gave this town to Kazan prince Qasim Khan, who served as tribute inspector of the Great Horde, but then came to Russian service. By other accounts, Qasim and his brother Yosif fled from Kazan after losing their bid for the throne against their brother Mäxmüd. After 1471, the town was known as Qasím city. It remained the capital of Qasim Khanate until 1681 when the khanate was absorbed into Russia.

A group of Tatars settled there in 15th century and are now known as Qasim Tatars. They speak the Mishar dialect, mixed with the Middle Tatar dialect of the Tatar language. In the 19th century, it became known for its waiters, who staffed many of the St Petersburg hotels.

== Administrative and municipal status ==
Within the framework of administrative divisions, Kasimov serves as the administrative center of Kasimovsky District, even though it is not a part of it. As an administrative division, it is incorporated separately as the town of oblast significance of Kasimov—an administrative unit with the status equal to that of the districts. As a municipal division, the town of oblast significance of Kasimov is incorporated as Kasimov Urban Okrug.

== Layout and landmarks ==
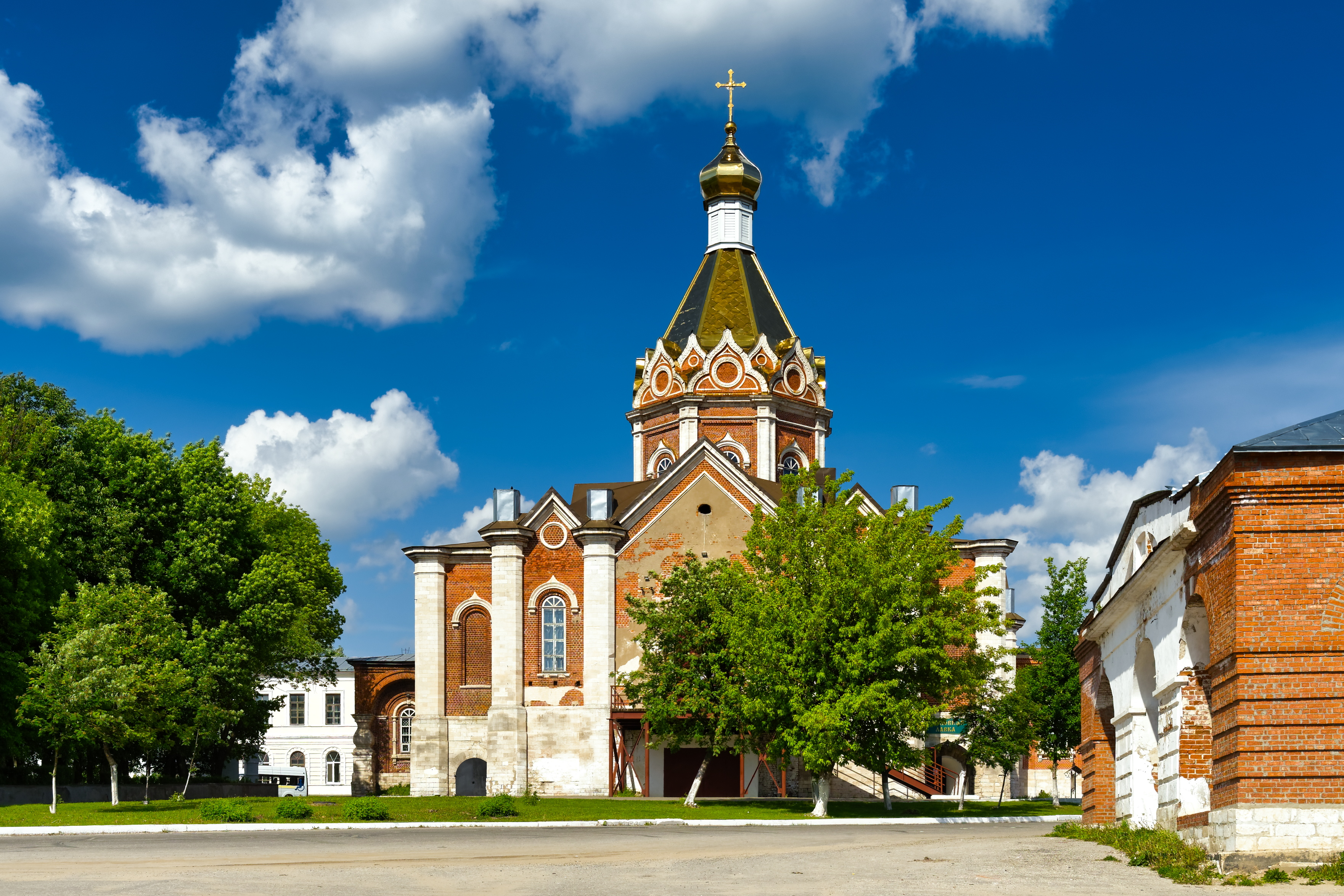
Ascension Cathedral

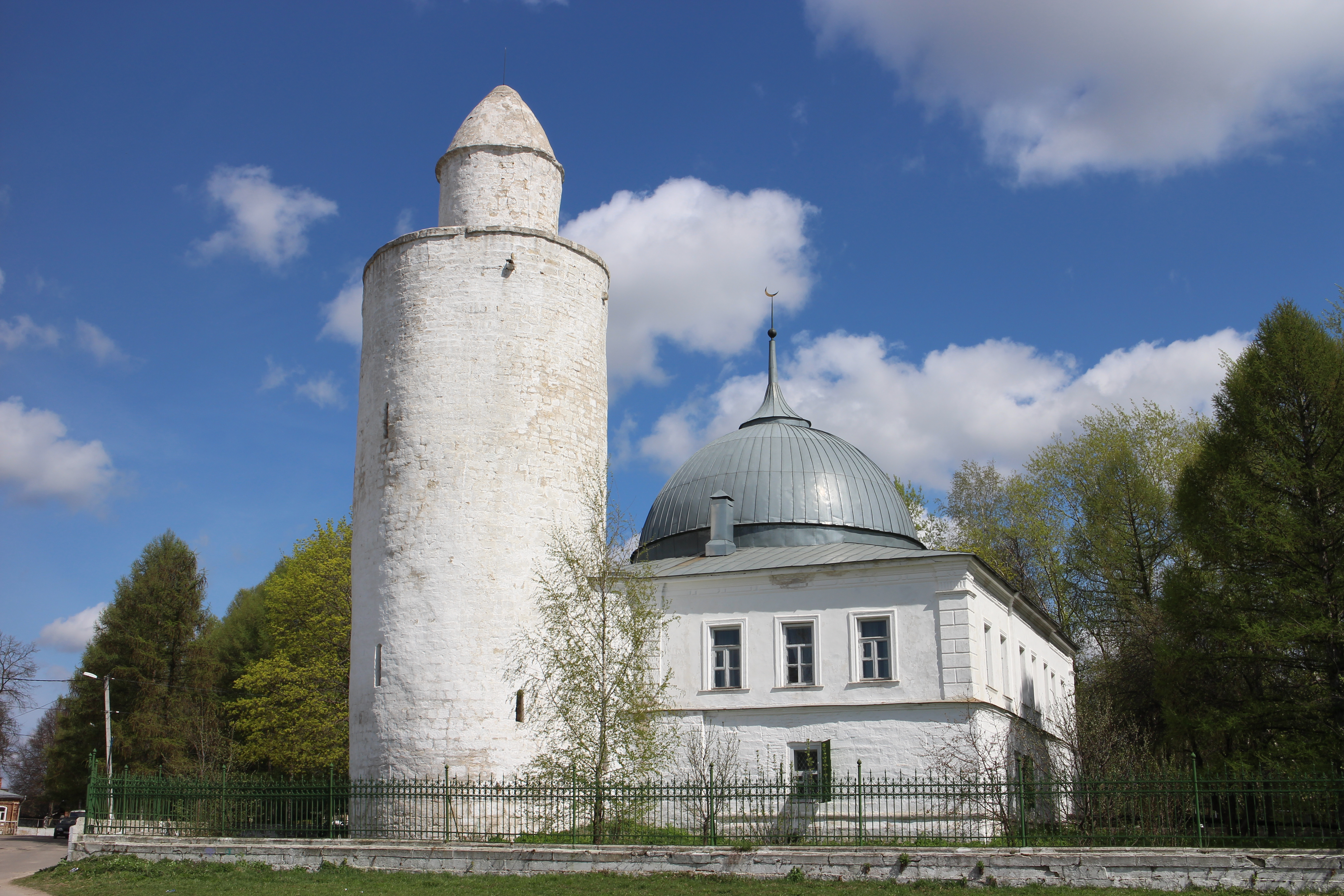
A 15th-century minaret in Kasimov

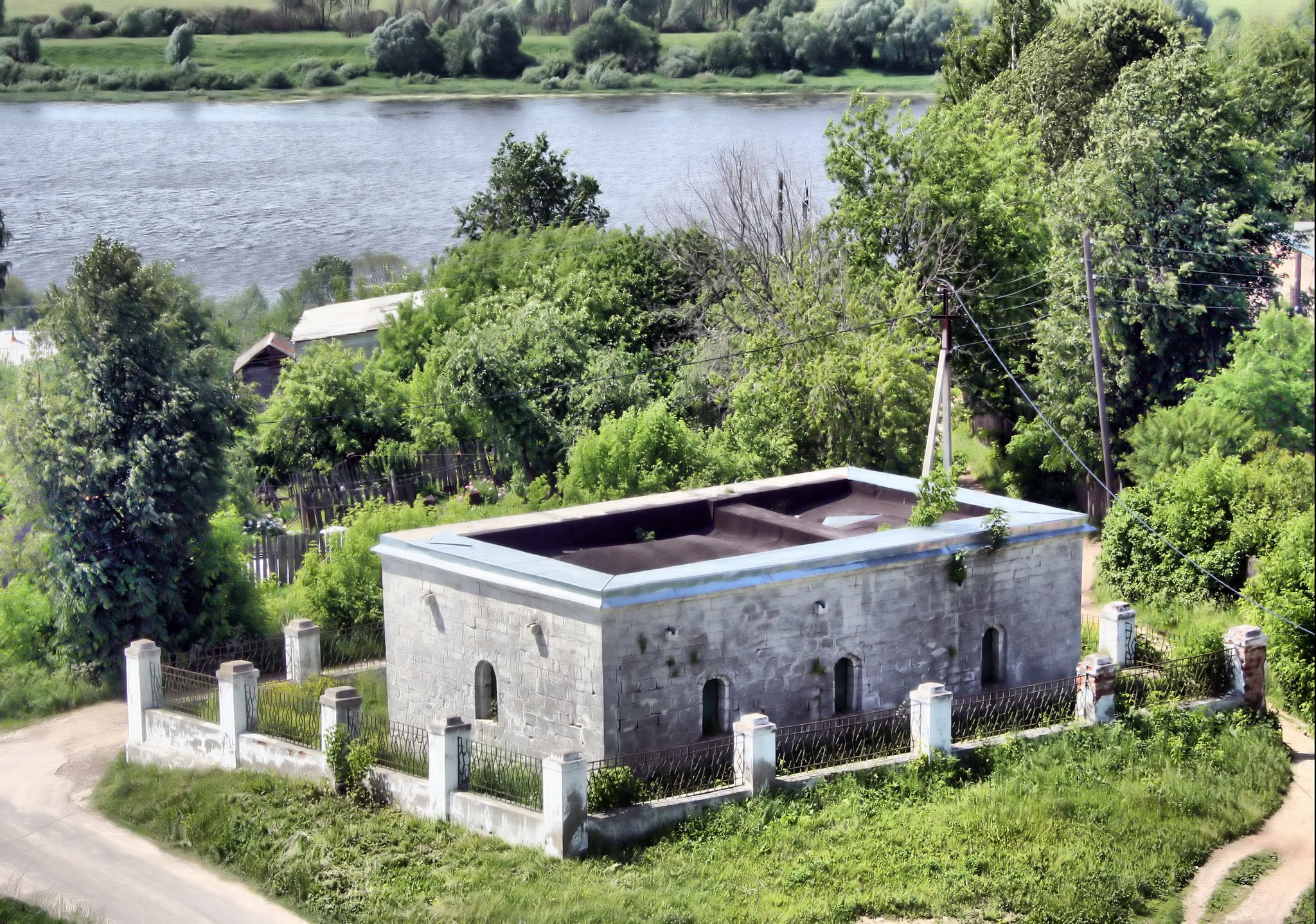
Mausoleum of Shahghali (1550s)

In the 17th century, the town was separated into three parts:

- Old Town (Russian: Старый Посад; Tatar: İske Bistä) and Tatar Town (Russian: Татарская слобода; Tatar: Tatar Bistäse) regulated by khan of Qasim Khanate and Tatar noblemen;
- Yamskoy Town (Russian: Ямская слобода) of Russian commoners, regulated by Moscow;
- Marfin Town (Russian: Марфина слобода, Tatar: Marfin Bistäse) – part of the city, regulated by Kasimov voyevodas.

Historical buildings:

- Khan's Mosque (with a limestone minaret from either 1467 or the 1550s)
- Mausoleum of Shahghali (Şahğäli) Khan (1555)
- Mausoleum of Afghan Moxammad (Äfğan Möxämmäd) Khan (1658)
- Russian Orthodox churches:
  - Church of the Epiphany (Богоявленская церковь) 17th century;
  - St. Nicholas Church (Никольская церковь) 17th century;
  - Trinity Church (Троицкая церковь) 17th century;
  - Cathedral of the Ascension (Вознесенский собор) 19th century.
