= Qasim Khanate =

1452–1681 Tatar vassal state of Russia

- 1452–1681
- Map of the Qasim Khanate
- Status: Monarchy
- Capital: Kasimov
- Official languages: Chagatai/Turki (lingua franca, literature); Volga Turki/Old Tatar
- Other common languages: Kipchak languages
- Khan
  - 1452–1469: Qasim Khan (first)
  - 1679–1681: Fatima Soltan (last)
- Historical era: Early modern period
  - Established: 1452
  - Disestablished: 1681
Preceded by	Succeeded by
Golden Horde	Tsardom of Russia

The Qasim Khanate (also called Qasimov, Kasimov, or Kasim), also known as the Tsardom of Kasimov (Russian: Касимовское царство), was a Tatar-ruled khanate which existed from 1452 until 1681 in the territory of the Russian state. It was located within modern-day Ryazan Oblast with its capital at Kasimov, in the middle course of the Oka River.

It was initially in the sphere of influence of the Grand Principality of Moscow and then was dependent on the Tsardom of Russia. The khanate was established in the lands which Grand Prince Vasily II of Moscow (r. 1425–1462) presented in 1452 to the Kazan prince Qasim Khan (d. 1469), son of the first Kazan khan Olug Moxammat.

== History ==
=== Origins ===
The original populations were the Volga Finnic tribes of the Meshchyora, Muroma and Mordvins. The lands were originally under the influence of Kievan Rus' and Volga Bulgaria. Local tribes were tributaries of Russian princes. Later, the area was incorporated into Vladimir-Suzdal. In 1152, Grand Prince Yuri Dolgoruky founded Gorodets-Meshchyorskiy. After the Mongol invasions, the territory was incorporated into the territory of the Golden Horde. Turkic settlers appeared in those areas, and most of them accepted Islam under the influence from the Volga Bulgars.

According to some historians, such as Mikhail Khudyakov, the defeated Muscovite prince Vasily executed the claim and Moxammat's son Qasim was crowned as a ruler of the Meshchyora lands. The area and capital were renamed after him. Another version is that Qasim came into Russian service and was granted those lands to create a buffer state between Moscow and the Khanate of Kazan. The establishment of the khanate is dated to no later than 1456. From the beginning, its khans governed the khanate's territory, but was then under Russian control from the 1530s. Most historians say that the Russians began to interfere in its internal affairs and then introduced elements of a subordinate administration. A permanent representative with the rank of okolnichy was established in November 1542. In 1552, its rulers began to be offered large estates in the districts of Kasimov and Yelatma. From the second half of the 16th century, the Russian army reduced the number of detachments from Kasimov.

=== Later history ===
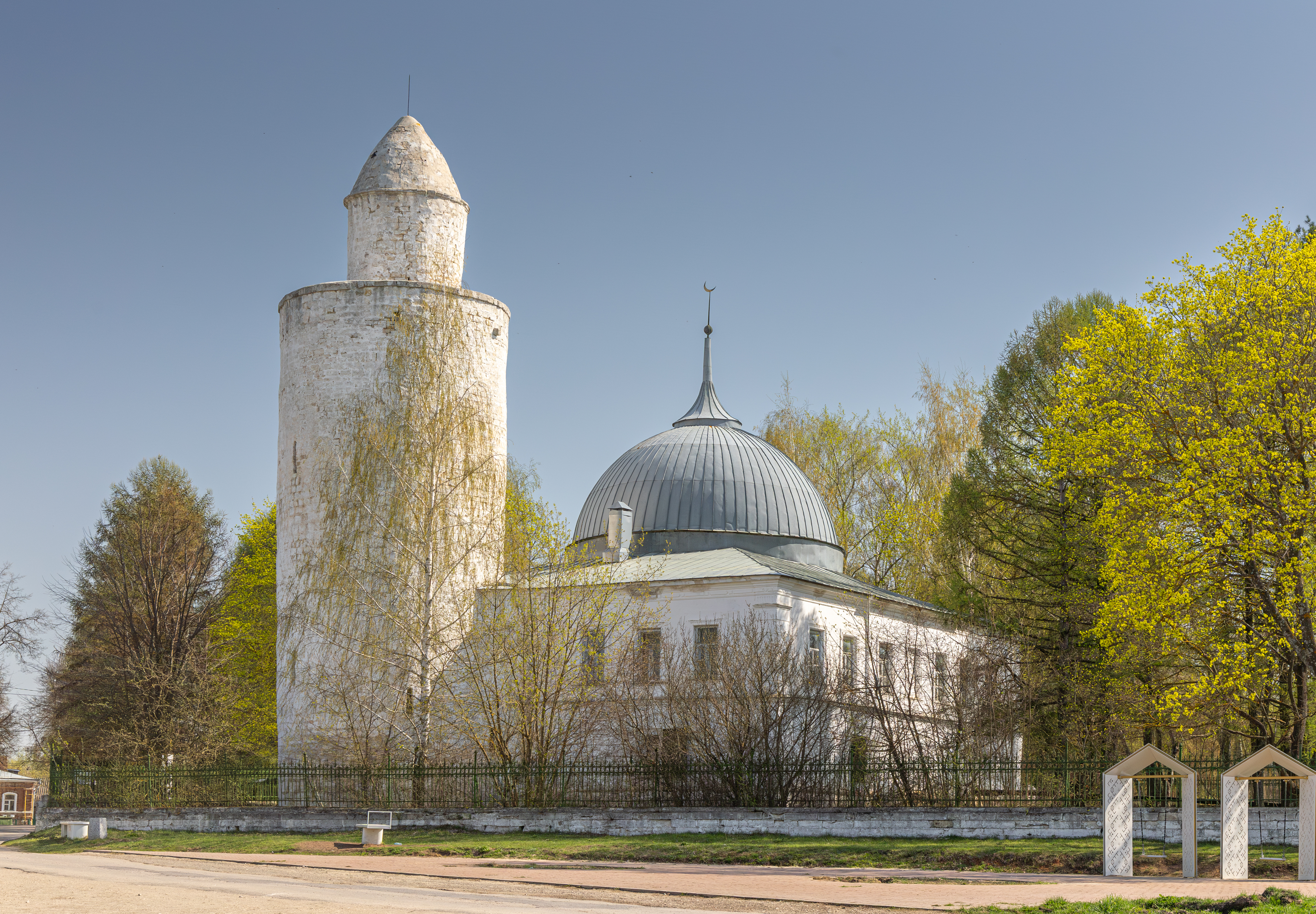
The minaret of the Khan's Mosque in Kasimov dates from the 15th century.

Qasim khans with their guard participated in all of Moscow's raids into Kazan (1467–1469, 1487, 1552). Qasim claimed the throne of the Khanate of Kazan in 1467 and was supported by Ivan III, but the failure of the Russo-Kazan War of 1467–1469 caused him to return to his possessions. Daniyal (r. 1469–1486) was involved in various military campaigns led by Ivan III. From 1486, the descendants of Ulugh Muhammad were replaced with representatives of the Giray dynasty. Nur Devlet, a Russian ally, made dynastic claims to the throne of Kasimov, which allowed the Russian government to exert pressure of the policies of the Crimean Khanate.

Şahğäli (1515–1567) was three times crowned as Kazan khan with the aid of Muscovy. After the conquest of Kazan, the self-government of the khans was abolished and the khanate came to be governed by Russian voyevodas. However, khans still reigned. One of the khans, Simeon Bekbulatovich, was baptised and proclaimed as the grand prince of Russia in 1574. He never really reigned and was used for a short period by Russian tsar Ivan the Terrible as a figurehead ruler without any real power. During the reign of Sayed Borhan khan (1627–1679), Russia began a policy of Christianization. Begs, who had a status equal to boyars, were switched to Serving Tatars, equal to Dvoryans. This policy provoked a Tatar revolt in 1656. After the death of khanbika (queen) Fatima Soltan in 1681, the Khanate was abolished.

== Population ==
The land was inhabited mainly by Mordvins, some of them as well as other Volga Finnic peoples like the Meshchyora and Muroma have been assimilated by Tatars and became Mishar Tatars. Later, the land was settled by the Russians. Some Kazan Tatars resettled to Qasim lands, and were called Qasim Tatars. Most of the Qasim Tatars served at the khan's palace or served in the khan's military. This group had been assimilated into the Mishar Tatars, but nearly 1,000 Qasim Tatars are still living in the city of Kasimov.

The noble families were the Manghyt (Manğıt), Arghyn (Arğın), Jalair (Cälair), Qipchaq (Qıpçaq). Moscow's administrators elected the khans from ruling families of the Tatar khanates: Khanate of Kazan, the Crimean Khanate, and the Siberia Khanate.

== See also ==
- List of Qasim khans
- List of Sunni dynasties

== Bibliography ==
- "Qasím Xanlığı/Касыйм ханлыгы". Tatar Encyclopaedia (in Tatar). Kazan: The Republic of Tatarstan Academy of Sciences. Institution of the Tatar Encyclopaedia. 2002.
- Halperin, Charles J. (1987). Russia and the Golden Horde: The Mongol Impact on Medieval Russian History. Indiana University. p. 222. ISBN 9781850430575. (e-book).
- Martin, Janet (2007). Medieval Russia: 980–1584. Second Edition. E-book. Cambridge: Cambridge University Press. ISBN 978-0-511-36800-4.
- Rakhimzyanov, B. R. (2009). "Касимовское царство" [Tsardom of Kasimov]. In Kravets, S. L. (ed.). Большая Российская энциклопедия. Том 13: Канцелярия конфискации — Киргизы (in Russian). Большая Российская энциклопедия. pp. 269–270. ISBN 978-5-85270-344-6.
