= List of Mongol rulers =

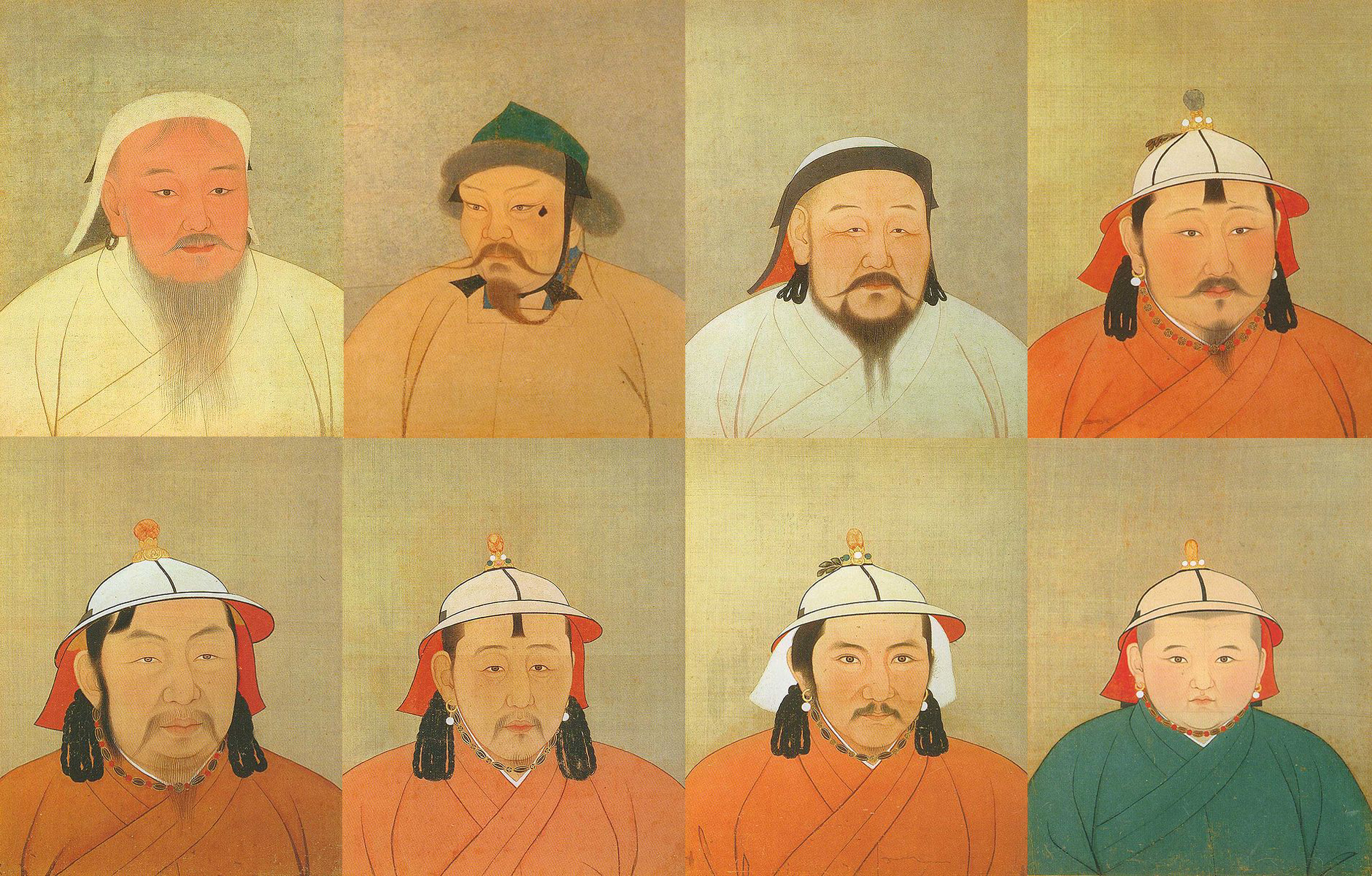
8 of 15 khagans of the Mongol Empire.

Mongol Empire and its fragmentation

Imperial Seal of the Mongols

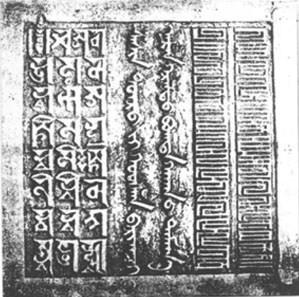
Imperial Seal of Bogd Khan

The following is a list of Mongol rulers.

The list of states is chronological but follows the development of different dynasties.

== Before Genghis Khan ==
- Kaidu (? – 1100)
- Bashinkhor Dogshin (1100 – ?)
- Tumbinai Khan (? – 1130)
- Khabul Khan (1131–1148)
- Ambaghai (1148 – 1156)
- Hotula Khan (1156–1161)
- Yesugei (1160–1171)

== Mongol Empire (1206–1368) ==
=== Great Khans and Yuan dynasty ===
Before Kublai Khan announced the dynastic name "Great Yuan" in 1271, Great Khans (Khagan) of the Mongol Empire (Ikh Mongol Uls) already started to use the Chinese title of Emperor (Chinese: 皇帝; pinyin: Huángdì) practically in the Chinese language since Genghis Khan (as 成吉思皇帝; 'Genghis Emperor').

With the establishment of the Yuan dynasty in 1271, the Kublaids became Yuan emperors, who took on a dual identity of Khagan for the Mongols and Huangdi for ethnic Han.

Ruler	Reign	Information
Genghis Khan	1206 - 1227	The first Khan of the Mongol Empire.
Tolui Khan	1227 - 1229	Regent of the Mongol Empire until his brother, Ögedei became Khan.
Ögedei Khan	13 September 1229 – 11 December 1241	The second Khan of the Mongol Empire.
Töregene Khatun	1242 - 1246	Regent of the Mongol Empire until the election of her son, Güyük Khan.
Güyük Khan	24 August 1246 – 20 April 1248	The third Khan of the Mongol Empire.
Oghul Qaimish	1248 - 1251	Regent of the Mongol Empire until her death in 1251.
Möngke Khan	1 July 1251 – 11 August 1259	The fourth Khan of the Mongol Empire.
Ariq Böke	11 August 1259 – 12 August 1264	Claimed the title of Great Khan and fought against Kublai in the Toluid Civil War.
Kublai Khan	15 April 1260 – 18 February 1294	Fifth and last Khan of the unified Mongol Empire. The first emperor of the Yuan Dynasty.
Temür Khan	10 May 1294 – 10 February 1307	The second emperor of the Yuan Dynasty.
Külüg Khan	21 June 1307 – 27 January 1311	The third emperor of the Yuan Dynasty.
Ayurbarwada Buyantu Khan	7 April 1311 – 1 March 1320	The fourth emperor of the Yuan Dynasty.
Gegeen Khan	19 April 1320 – 4 September 1323	The fifth emperor of the Yuan Dynasty.
Yesün Temür	4 October 1323 – 15 August 1328	The sixth emperor of the Yuan Dynasty.
Ragibagh Khan	October 1328 - 14 November 1328	The seventh emperor of the Yuan Dynasty.
Jayaatu Khan Tugh Temür	16 October 1328 – 26 February 1329. (first reign); 8 September 1329 – 2 September 1332 (second reign)	The eighth emperor of the Yuan Dynasty
Khutughtu Khan Kusala	27 February 1329 – 30 August 1329	The ninth emperor of the Yuan Dynasty. Seized the throne from Jayaatu Khan Tugh Temür.
Rinchinbal Khan	23 October 1332 – 14 December 1332	The tenth emperor of the Yuan Dynasty.
Toghon Temür	19 July 1333 – 10 September 1368	The eleventh emperor and last emperor of the Yuan Dynasty. Also the first emperor of the Northern Yuan Dynasty.

=== Golden Horde ===
- Batu Khan (1227–1255)
- Sartaq (1255–56)
- Ulaghchi (1257)
- Berke (1257–1266)
- Mengu-Timur (1266–1282)
- Tuda Mengu (1282–1287)
- Talabuga (1287–1291)
- Toqta (1291–1312)
- Uzbeg Khan (1312–1341)
- Tini Beg (1341–1342)
- Jani Beg (1342–1357)
- Berdi Beg (1357–1361)
- Qulpa (1359–1360)
- Nawruz Beg (1360–1361)
- Khidr (1361–1362)
- Timur Khwaja (1362)
- Abdallah (1362–1370), actual ruler was Mamai
- Murad (1362–1367), actual ruler was Mamai
- Aziz (1367–1369), actual ruler was Mamai
- Jani Beg II (1369–1370), actual ruler was Mamai
- Muhammad Bolak (1370–1379), actual ruler was Mamai
- Tulun Beg Khanum (1370–1373), actual ruler was Mamai
- Aig Beg (1373–1376), actual ruler was Mamai
- Arab Shaykh (1376–1379), actual ruler was Mamai
- Kagan Beg (1375–1376), actual ruler was Mamai
- Ilbani (1373–1376), actual ruler was Mamai
- Ḥājjī Cherkes (1375–1376), actual ruler was Mamai
- Urus Khan (1376–1378), Urus was also Khan of the White Horde and uncle of Toqtamish, allowing the Hordes to unite.
- Muhammad Bolaq (1375), actual ruler was Mamai
- Ghiyath-ud-din Khaqan Beg (1375–1377)
- Toqtaqiya (1377)
- Arab Shah Muzaffar (1377–1380), actual ruler was Mamai
- Timur-Malik (1377–1378)
- Ghiyath-ud-din Khaqan Beg (1375–1377)
- Tokhtamysh (1380–1395)
- Temür Qutlugh (1396–1401), actual ruler was Edigu
- Shadi Beg (1399–1407), actual ruler was Edigu
- Pulad (1407–1410), actual ruler was Edigu
- Temür (1410–1412)
- Jalal ad-Din khan (1411–1412)
- Feicüs al-Doste (1413–1414)
- Karimberdi
- Kebeg
- Jabbar Berdi (1417–1419)
- Olugh Mokhammad (1419–1421, 1428–1433)
- Dawlat Berdi (1419–1421, 1427–1432)
- Baraq (1422–1427)
- Seyid Akhmed (1433–1435)
- Küchük Muhammad (1435–1459)
- Mahmud (1459–1465)
- Ahmed (1465–1481)
- Shayk Ahmad (1481–1498, 1499–1502)
- Murtada (1498–1499)

==== Left wing (White Horde) ====
- Orda (1226–1251)
- Qun Quran (1251–c.1280)
- Köchü (c.1280–1302)
- Buyan (Bayan) (1302–1309)
- Sasibuqa (1309–1315)
- Ilbasan (1315–1320)
- Mubarak Khwaja (1320–1344)
- Chimtay (1344–1374)
- Urus (1374–1376)
- Toqtaqiya (1376)
- Timur-Malik (1377)
- Tokhtamysh (1377–1378)
- Koiruchik (1378–1399)
- Baraq (1423–1428)
- Muhammed (1428–1431)
- Mustafa (1431–1446)

Ögedei Khanate

Kaydu Ulus

- Kaydu
- Chapar
- Ali Sultan
- Danişmendji
- Soyurgatmish
- Sultan Mahmud Khan

Yenisei Kingdom

- Melig
- Ayachi
- Abdullah
- Tuman
- Taywan
- Timürci
- Arg Temur
- Hutulugtumor

==== Right wing (Blue Horde) ====
Actual rulers of the Golden Horde (Jochid Ulus, Kipchak Khanate) were members of the House of Batu until 1361.

Ruler	Reign	Information
Batu Khan	1227 - 1255	The first Khan of the Golden Horde and the first Khan of its Western Half (the Blue Horde).
Sartaq Khan	1256 - 1257	The second Khan of the Golden Horde and the Blue Horde.
Ulaghchi	1257	The third Khan of the Golden Horde and Blue Horde. The last Khan of the Golden Horde that believed in Tengrism.
Berke Khan	1257 - 1266	The fourth Khan of the Golden Horde and the Blue Horde. The first Islamic Khan of the Golden Horde and supporter of Ariq Böke in the Toluid Civil War.
Mengu-Timur	1266 - 1280	The fifth Khan of the Golden Horde and the Blue Horde.
Tode Mongke	1280 - 1287	The sixth Khan of the Golden Horde and the Blue Horde.
Talabuga	1287 - 1291	The seventh Khan of the Golden Horde and the Blue Horde.
Toqta	1291 - 1312	The eighth Khan of the Golden Horde and the Blue Horde.
Özbeg Khan	1313 - 1341	The ninth Khan of the Golden Horde and the Blue Horde.
Tini Beg	1341 - 1342	The tenth Khan of the Golden Horde and the Blue Horde.
Jani Beg	1342 - 1357	The eleventh Khan of the Golden Horde and the Blue Horde.
Berdi Beg	1357 - 1359	The twelve Khan of the Golden Horde and Blue Horde.
Qulpa	August 1359 - February 1360	The thirteenth Khan of the Golden Horde and Blue Horde.
Nawruz Beg	1360	The fourteenth Khan of the Golden Horde and Blue Horde.
Khiḍr Khan	1360 - 1361	The fifteenth Khan of the Golden Horde and Blue Horde.
Timur Khwaja	1361	The sixteenth Khan of the Golden Horde and Blue Horde.
Ordu Malik	1361	The seventeenth Khan of the Golden Horde and Blue Horde.
Kildi Beg	1361 - 1362	The eighteenth Khan of the Golden Horde and the Blue Horde.
Abdallāh	1361 - 1370	The nineteenth Khan of the Golden Horde and Blue Horde. Under the influence of Mamai.
Tulun Beg Khanum	1370 - 1371	The first Queen of the Golden Horde and Blue Horde.
Muhammad Sultan	1370/1371 - 1379	The twentieth Khan of the Golden Horde and Blue Horde. Under the influence of Mamai.
Tulak	1379 - 1380	The twenty-first Khan of the Golden Horde and Blue Horde. Under the influence of Mamai.

=== Ilkhanate ===
- Hülëgü (1256–1265)
- Abaqa (1265–1282)
- Tekuder (1282–1284)
- Arghun (1284–1291)
- Gaykhatu (1291–1295)
- Baydu (1295)
- Ghazan (1295–1304)
- Öljaitü (1304–1316)
- Abu Sa'id (1316–1335)
- Arpa Ke'ün (1335–1336)

After the murder of Arpa, the regional states established during the disintegration of the Ilkhanate raised their own candidates as claimants.

- Musa (1336–1337) (puppet of 'Ali Padshah of Baghdad)
- Muhammad (1336–1338) (Jalayirid puppet)
- Sati Beg (1338–1339) (Chobanid puppet)
- Sulayman (1339–1343) (Chobanid puppet, recognized by the Sarbadars 1341–1343)
- Jahan Temür (1339–1340) (Jalayirid puppet)
- Anushirwan (1343–1356) (non-dynastic Chobanid puppet)
- Ghazan II (1356–1357) (known only from coinage)

Claimants from eastern Persia (Khurasan):

- Togha Temür (c. 1338–1353) (recognized by the Kartids 1338–1349; by the Jalayirids 1338–1339, 1340–1344; by the Sarbadars 1338–1341, 1344, 1353)
- Luqman (1353–1388) (son of Togha Temür)

=== Chagatai Khanate ===
- Chagatai Khan 1226–1242
- Qara Hülëgü 1242–1246 d. 1252
- Yesü Möngke 1246–1252
- Qara Hülëgü (restored) 1252
- Mubarak Shah 1252–1260
  - Orghana Khatun (fem.), regent 1252–1260
- Alghu 1260–1266
- Mubarak Shah (restored) 1266
- Baraq 1266–1270
- Negübei 1270–c. 1272
- Buqa Temür c. 1272–1287
- Duwa 1287–1307
- Könchek 1306–1308
- Taliqu 1308–1309
- Kebek 1309 d. 1325
- Esen Buqa I 1309–c. 1318
- Kebek (restored) c. 1318–1325
- Eljigidey 1325–1329
- Duwa Temür 1329–1330
- Aladdin Tarmashirin 1331–1334
- Buzan 1334–1335
- Changshi 1335–1338
- Yesun Temur c. 1338–c. 1342 with...
- 'Ali-Sultan 1342
- Muhammad I ibn Pulad 1342–1343
- Qazan Khan ibn Yasaur 1343–1346
- Danishmendji 1346–1348

The Chagatai Khanate was split into two parts, the Western Chagatai Khanate and the Eastern Chagatai Khanate (Moghulistan).

==== Western Chagatai Khanate ====
- Bayan Qulï 1348–1358
- Shah Temür 1358
- Tughlugh Timur (in Mogulistan 1348–1363) 1358–1363
- Ilyas Khodja (in Mogulistan 1363–1368) 1363 d. 1368
- Adil-Sultan 1363
- Khabul Shah 1364–1370

From 1370 on, the Western Chagatai Khans were puppets of Timur.

- Suurgatmish 1370–1388
- Sultan Mahmud (Mohammed II) 1388–1403

==== Eastern Chagatai Khanate (Moghulistan) ====
Moghulistan was split into the Turpan Khanate and Yarkent Khanate in the late 15th century.

.

== Northern Yuan dynasty (1368–1635) ==
Khagans of the Mongols or Northern Yuan dynasty (rump state of Yuan dynasty until 1388):

- Toghon Temür (1368–1370)
- Biligtü Khan Ayushiridara (1370–1378)
- Uskhal Khan Tögüs Temür (1378–1388)
- Jorightu Khan Yesüder (1388–1391) – descendant of Ariq Böke
- Engke Khan (1391–1394) – descendant of Ariq Böke
- Elbeg Nigülesügchi Khan (1394–1399)
- Gün Temür Khan (1399–1402) – descendant of Ariq Böke
- Örüg Temür Khan (nickname Guilichi) (1402–1408) – descendant of Ögedei
- Öljei Temür Khan (Bunyashiri) (1408–1412)
- Delbeg Khan (Dalbag) (1412–1415) – descendant of Ariq Böke
- Oyiradai (1415–1425) – descendant of Ariq Böke
- Adai Khan (1425–1438) – descendant of Ögedei
- Tayisung Khan Toghtoa Bukha (1433–1452)
- Agbarjin (1453)
- Esen taishi – the leader of the Oirats (1453–1454) – non-Chingisid
- Markörgis Khan (Ükegtü) (1454–1465)
- Molon Khan (1465–1466)
- Manduul Khan (1475–1478)
- Dayan Khan (Batu Möngke) (1478–1516)
- Bars Bolud Jinong (deputy)
- Bodi Alagh Khan (1516–1547)
- Daraisung Guden Khan (1547–1557)
- Tümen Jasagtu Khan (1557–1592)
- Buyan Sechen Khan (1592–1604)
- Ligdan Khan (1604–1634)
- Ejei Khan (1634–1635)

== Genghisid Khalkha Khans (1600s–1691) ==
Independent Khalkha Mongol Khans (before Outer Mongolia merged into the Manchu Qing dynasty):

=== Tüsheet Khans ===
- Abtai Sain Khan (1567–1588)
- Eriyekhei Mergen Khan (1589–?)
- Gombodorji Khan (d. 1655)
- Chakhun Dorji Khan (1654–1698)

=== Jasagtu Khans ===
- Laikhur Khan
- Subandai Khan
- Norbu Bisireltü Khan (d. 1661)
- Chambun Khan (1670?–)
- Zenggün
- Shara (d. 1687)

=== Sechen Khans ===
- Sholoi Setsen Khan (c. 1630–1650), son of Möru Buima Noyan and founder of the Setsen Khan line.
- Babu Setsen Khan (1655–1683), fifth son of Sholoi.
- Norov Setsen Khan (1683–1688), third son of Babu.
- Navaanneren (1910–1922), eldest son of Tserendondov, who was the son of Orjinjav, son of Artased.

=== Altan Khan of the Khalkha ===
- Ubasi Khong Tayiji (Shului Ubasha Khong Tayiji) (?–1623)
- Badma Erdeni Khong Tayiji (1623–?)
- Erinchin Lobsang Tayiji (or Lobdzang or Rinchen Sayin Khong Tayiji) (1658–1691)

== Oirats ==
=== Four Oirat (1399–1634) ===
- Khuuhai Dayuu (c. 1399)
- Ugetchi Khashikha (Mongolian: Ögöchi Khashikha; Mönkhtömör)
- Batula Chinsan (Bahamu, Mahamud) (1399–1408)
- Togoon Tayisi (Toghan) (1408–1438)
- Esen (1438–1454)
- Amasanj (1454–1455)
- Ush-Temür (Ish-Temür) (1455–1469)
- Khishig Urlugh
- Arkhan Chingsang

=== Dzungar Khanate ===
- Khara Khula (d. 1634)
- Baatur Khung-Taiji (1634–1653)
- Sengge (1653–1670)
- Galdan Boshugtu Khan (1670–1697)
- Tsewang Arabtan (1694–1727)
- Galdan Tseren Khan (1727–1745)
- Tsewang-Dorji-Namjil (1746–1749)
- Lamdarja (1749–1752)
- Dawachi (1752–1755)

=== Khans of Khoshut Khanate ===
- Güshi Khan Toro-Baikhu (1642–1655)
- Dayan Ochir Khan (1655–1669)
- Gonchug Dalai Khan (1669–1698)
- Lhazang Chingis Khan (1698–1717)

=== Torghud khans of the Kalmyk Khanate ===
- Kho Orluk (d. 1644)
- Shukhur Daichin (1644–1661)
- Puntsuk (1661–1669)
- Ayuka Khan (1669–1724)
- Tseren Donduk Khan (1724–1735)
- Donduk Ombo Khan (1735–1741)
- Donduk Dashi Khan (1741–1761)
- Ubashi Khan (1762–1771)

== Bogd Khanate of Mongolia (1911–1924) ==
Ruler	Photo	Seal	Reign	Information
Bogd Khan			29 December 1911 – 20 May 1924	The first and only Khagan of the Bogd Khanate of Mongolia. Also the eighth 8th Jebtsundamba Khutuktu of Borjigin Zanabazar.

== See also ==
- Borjigin
- Choros (Oirats)
- History of Mongolia
- Khoshut
- List of heads of state of Mongolia
- List of Mongol khatuns
- List of Mongol states
- Yuan dynasty family tree
