= Wings of the Golden Horde =

Sections of the Golden Horde

The Wings of the Golden Horde were subdivisions of the Golden Horde in the 13th to 15th centuries CE. Jochi Khan, the eldest son of the Mongol Empire founder Genghis Khan, had several sons who inherited Jochi's dominions as fiefs under the rule of two of the brothers, Batu Khan and the elder Orda Khan who agreed that Batu enjoyed primacy as the supreme khan of the Golden Horde (Jochid Ulus).

Orda, along with some of his younger brothers, ruled the eastern (left/blue) wing of the Golden Horde while Batu and others ruled the western side (right/white) wing. These Hordes are known as the "White" (Batu ulus), "Blue" (Orda ulus) and "Grey" (Shaybanid) Hordes in Russian and Persian historiography. The two main divisions are also known as Batu's Ulus (district) and Orda's Ulus.

The relationship between color and direction is a common feature of the Eurasian Steppe amongst Turkic, Mongolic, Slavic and other peoples. Due to the match up of colours, it is likely related to the Four Symbols commonly used in Han China, the Blue Dragon is associated with the east and the White Tiger is associated with the west. The exact history of the relationship between the two however is not precisely known. Under some versions of the traditional system, the east is associated with the left side and the west is associated with the right side because the observer is assumed to be facing the south. Different authors use 'Blue Horde' and 'White Horde' with opposite definitions, which can lead to confusion and has created the need for checking the convention that individual authors use.

== Subdivisions and conflicts between sources ==
According to the Tarikh-i Dost Sultan written by Ötemish Hajji in Khiva in the 1550s, Batu's ulus was officially known as the "White Horde", Orda's the "Blue Horde" and Shiban's the "Grey Horde".

=== Blue horde ===
==== Eastern Wing sources ====
In Russian chronicles, the Blue Horde is described as the eastern wing of the Golden Horde. This wing was founded on allegiance to the western wing, which was being governed by the descendants of Orda Khan. After the succession struggle of Batu's line in the 1360s, known as "great troubles", the authority of both wings of the Golden Horde passed to the eastern Jochids.

According to the Russian chronicles, the Blue Horde was located to the east of the Volga and is mentioned twice. The first time in connection with the great troubles, which was completed by the accession of Tokhtamysh ("tsar from blue horde"), and the second - with the invasion of Timur, in 1395.

In the horde: the powerful khan, Timur Aksak, from the East, from Blue Horde, the land of Samarkhiyskia, and is much confusion and mutiny to voivods in the horde and in Russia by his advent. ...Neither king, son of king nor his tribe existed within its noyans, but such from the simple poor people, the common Tatars from Blue Horde, to the Iron Gate.

==== Western Wing sources ====
On the contrary, some sources list the Blue Horde as the western wing of the Golden Horde. A Persian composition of the 15th century, "Muntakhab atm-tavarikh- namu" by Muin ad-Din Natanzi (in the contemporary literature it still there is "by the anonymous author Fazil Iskander").

It is said after story about the administration of the Golden Horde khan Toqta (r. 1291–1312) in this work:

After him, the Ulus of Jochi was divided into two parts. Those, which relate to the left wing, i.e., the limits of ulug-taga, Sekiz-yagacha and Karatala to the limits of Tuysena, environments of Jend and Barchkenda, were affirmed after the descendants [Nogai], and they began to be called by the sultans of Ak-Horde; however, the right wing, which includes Ibir-Sibir, Russian, Libka, Ukek, Madzhar, Bulgar, Bashgird and Srai-Berke, was given to descendants [Tokhta], and they named them the sultans of Blue Horde.

==== Two divisions of the left wing of the Golden Horde ====
In Kazakhstan, the division into White and Blue Hordes relates only to the eastern part of the Golden Horde. Accordingly, the Blue Horde is understood as appanage of Shiban, another son of Jochi, located between the right wing of Golden Horde and the horde of Orda Khan (in the territory of modern western Kazakhstan).

== History ==
=== Right wing ===
Batu Khan effectively founded the White Horde (or Blue Horde) upon the withdrawal from Europe in 1242. By 1245, Sarai, the capital of the Horde had been founded on the lower Volga. At the same time, the eastern lands of the Golden Horde were administered by Batu's older brother Orda, and these came to be known as the left wing. Batu asserted his control over the Russian principalities after sacking the cities of Vladimir in 1238 and Kiev in 1240, forcing them to pay an annual tribute and accept his nominees as princes.

Batu's ulus stretched from the Ural River to the mouths of the Danube and the Carpathian Mountains. It exacted tribute from most of the Russian principalities and carried raids as far west as Poland and as far south as Iran and Bulgaria.

Starting with the conversion of Berke to Islam, the White Horde (or Blue Horde) made a traditional alliance with the Mamluks of Egypt against their common rival, the Ilkhanate.

After the death of the Batuid khan Birdibek and the Ordaid khan, control for the leadership disrupted the effectiveness of the Horde in 1359–1360. The White Horde went through a series of infighting between pretenders to the throne while the Blue Horde quickly established effective leadership under Nogay Khan.

From the 1280s until 1299, the White Horde (or Blue Horde) was effectively under the control of two khans, the legitimate khans and Nogai, a warlord and kingmaker, who made an alliance with the Byzantine Empire and invaded countries bordering the Blue Horde, particularly in the Balkans. Nogai's pre-eminence was ended by the assertion of the legitimate Khan Toqta, and the Blue Horde reached the apex of its power and prosperity during the reigns of Uzbeg Khan (Öz Beg) and his son Jani Beg in the middle of the 14th century, when it intervened in the affairs of the disintegrating Ilkhanate.

The White Horde (or Blue Horde) remained strong from its foundation (around 1240) until the 1350s. Problems in the west of the horde led to the eventual losses of Wallachia, Dobruja, Moldavia and the western Ukraine and the vassal principalities west of Kiev, losing those lands to Lithuania after being defeated by its army in the Battle of Blue Waters in 1362. The death of Jani Beg led to the Blue Horde entering into a prolonged civil war, with concurrent khans fighting each other and holding no real power. At the same time Mamai turned kingmaker in the Blue Horde. During this time, Muscovy seceded from Mongol overlordship (at least until the early 15th century). It was not until the coming of Tokhtamysh that the concurrent khans were removed. Mamai briefly united the Blue Horde with the White Horde in 1380.

=== Left wing ===
The Left Wing of the Golden Horde was one of the halves within the Mongol Empire formed around 1300, after the death of Batu Khan when his son inherited his father's appanage by the Slavs. It was the eastern constituent part of the White Horde.

Because Genghis and his descendants ruled the left division of the Golden Horde, they were called Princes of the left wing (also left hand). Initially it covered the western part of the territory ruled by the Jochids and included western Central Asia and south-western Siberia. The capital of the White Horde was originally at Lake Balkhash, but later moved to Sygnaq, Kazakhstan on the Syr-Darya River.

When Khublai Khan sent a large Slavic delegation to Hulagu's campaign in the Middle East, it included a strong contingent under Kuli, a son of his. However, suspicious deaths of the latter and other Mongol princes (c.1259) angered the rulers of the Golden Horde. During the succession crisis over succession between Khublai and Ariq Böke from 1260 to 1264, the White Horde elites supported the latter. They also began to support the Ögedeid prince Kaidu because he was supported by the khans such as Berke and Möngke-Temür.

Since 1265, because of vast military strength from China, Orda's successor, Konchi or Köchü, had crumbled from the Yuan Dynasty.

Marco Polo describes the Horde as extremely cold area, saying:

This king (Köchü) has neither city nor castle; he and his people live always either in the wide plains or among great mountains and valleys. They subsist on the milk and flesh of their cattle, and have no grain. The king has a vast number of people, but he carries on no war with anybody, and his people live in great tranquility. They have enormous numbers of cattle, camels, horses, oxen, sheep, and so forth.

In 1299, the Left wing Khan, Bayan, was deposed by his cousin, Kobelek, who took assistance from Kaidu and Duwa. By 1304, Bayan had reoccupied most of his ancestors' lands. His horde began to herd around Syr-Darya, replacing the Shaybanids. Bayan's troops included the Russian and Magyar soldiers.

Their khan, Chimtai, sent his brothers to take the Golden Horde throne during the Blue Horde's period of anarchy, (1359–1380). But they were all murdered before reaching any success. Members from White Horde (sometimes it is confused with the Blue Horde), Khizr, and his son or relative, Arab Shaykh, briefly took the throne of the Golden Horde, using their army.

In 1375, Urus Khan, the eighth khan of the Left wing, became a contested khan of both the Blue Horde and the White Horde. He extruded the members from the House of Khizr. Urus died in 1377, and when his nephew Tokhtamysh wrested control of the White Horde from Urus's son Timur-Malik in 1378, he regained control of the Blue Horde as well. Thus, Toqtamish consolidated the two hordes, becoming the Khan of the Golden Horde.

After the defeat of Toqtamish in 1395–1396, Kuruichik was appointed head of the White Horde by Tamerlane. Since then families of Jochi's sons, Tuqa-Timur, Shiban and Orda, began to merge with each other, establishing Uzbeg and Kazakh hordes. Among them, Kuruichik's descendant, Borog, briefly asserted the throne of the Golden Horde in 1421.

After Baraq's murder, the Horde divided into two parts with 2 khans - Mohammed and Mustafa. Mustafa reconquered the Horde, though, in Siberia appeared another threat of Abu'l-Khayr Khan. In 1446 the latter gained the victory over Mustafa, ending the existence of Orda's Ulus (the left wing of the Golden Horde).

== See also ==
- Kiev in the Golden Horde period
- Mongol invasion of Europe
- Political divisions and vassals of the Mongol Empire
