= Dawlat Berdi =

Khan of the Golden Horde (r. 1419–1421, 1428–1432)

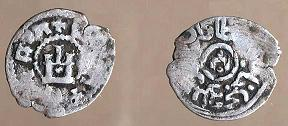
- Silver coin found in Kaffa bearing Dawlat Berdi's name

Khan of the Golden Horde (1st reign)
- Reign: 1419–1421
- Predecessor: Hajji Muhammad Khan ibn Oghlan Ali
- Successor: Barak Khan

Khan of the Golden Horde (2nd reign)
- Reign: 1428–1432
- Predecessor: Barak Khan
- Successor: Sayid Ahmad I
- Died: 1432
- Dynasty: Borjigin
- Father: Jabbar Berdi
- Religion: Sunni Islam

Dawlat Berdi (Turki/Kypchak and Persian: دولت بردی; died 1432), also known as Devlet Berdi, was Khan of the Golden Horde from 1419 to 1421, and again from 1428 until his death in 1432. He was the son of Jabbar Berdi and a descendant of Berke Khan.

== Life ==
His first reign was brief, lasting from 1419 to 1421, when he and his rival Ulugh Muhammad were defeated by Baraq. After Baraq's assassination in 1427, Dawlat established himself in Crimea. Ulugh Muhammad attempted an invasion of his territory in 1430, but was unable to defeat Berdi and retreated following the death of Vytautas, his main supporter.

Due to the efforts of Hacı I Giray Dawlat was never able to consolidate control over Crimea and was assassinated in 1432. His son, Äxmät, proved unable to resist the combined forces of Ulugh Muhammad and the Crimean Tatars and was defeated the following year, leading to the creation of the Crimean Khanate.

An unnamed daughter may have become the wife of John IV of Trebizond.

== Genealogy ==
- Genghis Khan
- Jochi
- Orda Khan
- Sartaqtay
- Köchü
- Bayan
- Sasibuqa
- Ilbasan
- Chimtay
- Tuli Kwadja
- Tokhtamysh
- Jabbar Berdi
- Dawlat Berdi

== See also ==
- List of khans of the Golden Horde
- Siege of Sarai

Dawlat Berdi House of Borjigin (Боржигин) (1206–1635)
Regnal titles
Preceded by Hajji Muhammad Khan ibn Oghlan Ali	Khan of the Golden Horde (with Ulugh Muhammad); 1419–1421	Succeeded by Baraq
Preceded by Baraq	Khan of the Golden Horde (with Ulugh Muhammad); 1427–1432	Succeeded by Sayid Ahmad I
