= Sayid Ahmad I =

Khan of the Golden Horde from 1433 to 1455

Khan of the Golden Horde
- Reign: 1427 – 1455
- Predecessor: Ulugh Muhammad
- Successor: Küchük Muhammad
- Died: 1455
- Dynasty: Borjigin
- Religion: Sunni Islam

Sayid Ahmad I (Turki/Kypchak and Persian: سید احمد خان) was Khan of the Golden Horde from 1427 or 1433 until 1455. Unlike the last five of six khans, Ahmad was a younger son of Tokhtamysh.

== Breakup of the Horde ==
While he died before the Horde dissolved, historians believe that Sayid Ahmad was responsible for creating the conditions in the khanate which allowed it to happen.

== Genealogy ==
- Genghis Khan
- Jochi
- Orda Khan
- Sartaqtay
- Köchü
- Bayan
- Sasibuqa
- Ilbasan
- Chimtay
- Tuli Kwadja
- Tokhtamysh
- Sayid Ahmad

Sayid Ahmad I House of Qiyat (Хияад) (1206–1635)
Regnal titles
Preceded by Olugh Mokhammad	Khan of the Golden Horde; 1427–1455	Succeeded by Küchük Muhammad
