= Mubarak Khwaja =

Khan of the White Horde until 1344

Khan of the Golden Horde Eastern Half (White Horde)
- Reign: 1366 – 1368
- Predecessor: Ilbasan
- Successor: Ulus Khan
- Dynasty: Borjigin
- Religion: Sunni Islam

Mubarak Khwaja (Turki/Kypchak and Persian: مبارک خواجه) was the khan of the White Horde until 1368.

== Genealogy ==
- Genghis Khan
- Jochi
- Orda Khan
- Sartaqtay
- Köchü
- Bayan
- Sasibuqa
- Mubarak Khwaja

== See also ==
- List of khans of the Golden Horde

Mubarak Khwaja House of Borjigin (1206-1635)
Regnal titles
Preceded by Ilbasan	Khan of the White Horde; 1320–1344	Succeeded by Chimtay
