= Urus Khan =

Khan of the Golden Horde from 1369 to 1377

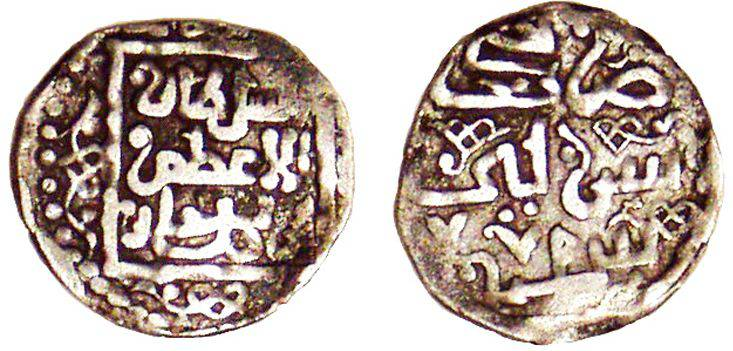
- Urus khan's coins in Lower Volga

Khan of the Golden Horde Eastern Half (White Horde)
- Reign: 1369–1377
- Predecessor: Chimtay
- Successor: Toqtaqiya

Khan of the Golden Horde Western Half (Blue Horde)
- Reign: 1373–1375
- Predecessor: Muḥammad-Sulṭān
- Successor: Qāghān Beg
- Died: 1377
- Dynasty: Borjigin
- Father: Badiq
- Religion: Sunni Islam

Urus Khan (Note: Kypchak/Turki and Persian: محمد اروس خان, romanized: Muḥammad Urūs Khān Kazakh: Ұрыс-Хан, romanized: Ūrys-Xan Urus had varying Perso-Arabic spellings including: اوروس, اورس, ارس and was varyingly transliterated as: Orys, Arys, Yrys, or Orys) (died 1377), also known as Oros, was the eighth Khan of the White Horde and a disputed Khan of the Blue Horde; he was a direct descendant of Genghis Khan. Urus himself was the direct ancestor of the khans of the Kazakh Khanate.

== Ancestry ==
The descent of Urus, according to the genealogical information of the Jāmiʿ al-tawārīkh, the Muʿizz al-ansāb and the Tawārīḫ-i guzīdah-i nuṣrat-nāmah was as follows: Genghis Khan - Jochi - Tuqa-Timur - Uz-Timur/Urung-Timur - Achiq - Taqtaq - Timur Khwaja - Badiq - Urus. However, the fictional descent from Jochi's son Orda found in older literature continues to be cited in many works.

The word Urus has multiple meanings in Turkic languages. One means "battle" and "warlike", thus Urus-Muhammad can be interpreted as Warlike-Muhammad. Another meaning of the word Urus is "Russian" in the Turkic languages and his mother was presumably a Russian princess, a fact he later exploited to press his claims in Russia. The third version interprets it as unity and blessing from Kipchak-Turkic. There is no order in the coins of Urus-khan himself – Urus, Arus, Urs, Ursh.

== Biography ==
Urus Khan was a descendant of Jochi's thirteenth son Tuqa-Timur. In 1260, coins may have been minted in Tuqa-Timur's name in Crimea. When Mengu-Timur ruled the Golden Horde, he gave Tuqa-Timur's son Urung-Timur (also called Uz-Timur and Urungbash) lands in the Crimea, which were retained by his descendants.

The early years of Urus Khan are not recorded in the sources. In the 1350s Urus decided to move from the Volga region to the south-eastern part of the Golden Horde. This was the former Ulus of Orda, which had been suppressed by 1330 by Öz Beg Khan. It was governed on behalf of the khan from Sighnaq by a governor from the Qiyats clan, Jir-Qutluq, son of Isatay. He was killed in a skirmish by Urus, who was cossacking with a small group of his associates. Nevertheless, Jir-Qutluq was succeeded as governor by his son Tingiz-Buqa, who ruthlessly suppressed the opposition.

When Khan Berdi Beg was dying, Tingiz-Buqa conspired to set up a khan of his own, but his choice, a descendant of Tuqa-Timur named Qara Nogai, betrayed and murdered him, in 1359/1360. Qara Nogai nevertheless did assume the throne of the former Ulus of Orda, but died after only three years, in 1363. He was succeeded by a nephew (Tughluq-Timur), a cousin (Mubarak Khwaja, who began to strike his own coins), and a brother (Qutluq Khwaja). Urus had somehow escaped the wrath of Tingiz-Buqa, and survived the short reigns of his distant cousins. In 1368/1369, he seized the throne of the Ulus of Orda from Qutluq Khwaja and made himself khan. To secure his position and increase his authority, he eliminated those princes and emirs whom he considered his opponents. One of these victims was his cousin Tuy Khwaja, the father of the future Khan Tokhtamysh, which caused the implacable enmity of the latter toward Urus and his sons.

Having established himself in the east, Urus attempted to take over the Golden Horde's traditional capital, Sarai on the Lower Volga. He chased out the beglerbeg Mamai's protégé Muḥammad-Sulṭān in 1373 and appears to have briefly held the city, before losing it almost immediately to a local ruler, Ḥājjī Cherkes of Astrakhan, and then the Shibanid Īl Beg. When Mamai recovered Sarai for Muḥammad-Sulṭān again in 1374, Urus made another successful attempt on the city. Nevertheless, he did not manage to hold it long, losing it to Īl Beg's son Qāghān Beg in 1375.

During Urus' campaigns on the Lower Volga, his alienated and vengeful cousin Tokhtamysh made his way to Timur (Tamerlane) and sought his assistance against Urus and his family. Timur was accommodating, and furnished Tokhtamysh with resources and forces, allowing him to establish himself at Otrar and Sayram. Urus' son Qutlu-Buqa, who was governing the east in his father's absence attacked and expelled Tokhtamysh, who sought refuge with Timur again. Qutlu-Buqa, however, was mortally wounded in the battle. Supplied with more wealth and a fresh army by Timur, Tokhtamysh tried his luck again, only to be defeated by Urus' next son, Toqtaqiya; Tokhtamysh was wounded with an arrow in the arm, and only saved himself by swimming across the Seyhun (Syr Darya) river.

Urus Khan sent envoys to Tamerlane demanding to hand over Tokhtamysh:

«Toktamysh killed my son and, running away, came to your dominions; give me my enemy, if not, then, having appointed the place of battle, immediately come to battle»

The stage was now set for a major confrontation between Urus, who had temporarily given up on his ambition to hold Sarai, and Timur, who insisted on protecting and supporting Tokhtamysh. Urus and Timur advanced on each other in the space between Sighnaq and Otrar in 1376. In the course of small battles, Urus Khan's detachments inflicted several defeats on the commanders of Timur's troops. Having suffered significant losses in men, horses and supplies, Timur retreated to Samarkand and Kesh in the winter of 1376-1377. Bad weather delayed the impending engagement and, despite some skirmishes (in which Urus' son Timur-Malik was wounded), no decisive battle ensued. Urus marched home. By the time hostilities resumed and Timur advanced beyond Otrar, he learned in 1377 that Urus had died.

Timur now declared Tokhtamysh khan of the Golden Horde, but returned home himself. Urus was actually succeeded by his sons, Toqtaqiya, who died after two months, and Timur-Malik, who was defeated and killed by Tokhtamysh in 1379. Urus had reigned for nine years, but his attempts to hold Sarai and take over the western portions of the Golden Horde had met with failure.

== Descendants ==
Urus had four sons who played a political role: Kutlug-Buga, who governed in the east while Urus attempted to take over Sarai but predeceased his father; Toqtaqiya, who succeeded his father but died after two months; Timur-Malik, who succeeded his brother but was overthrown by his cousin Tokhtamysh; and Quyurchuq, who challenged Tokhtamysh for control of the Golden Horde in 1395–1397. Toqtaqiya's son Beg-Pulad and Quyurchuq's son Baraq also attempted to become khans of the Golden Horde, Baraq meeting with some success in 1423–1428.

== Kazakh Khanate ==
For the khans of the Kazakh Khanate, Urus Khan had a symbolic significance. In addition to the fact that he was the great-grandfather of the first Kazakh khans Jānī Beg and Giray, neighboring countries called the Kazakh Khanate "Urus Tsarev Yurt" or "Urus Khanov Yurt". Thus, it was his medieval contemporaries who considered the first khan of this state. Some historians, notably Radik Temirgaliev, identify Urus Khan with the legendary Alasha Khan, who, according to various sources, was called the first Kazakh khan and was considered the ancestor of all Kazakh khans and sultans. The mausoleum of Alash Khan is located in Ulytau, not far from the mausoleum of Jochi, but some historians say that Alasha Khan may be Genghis Khan himself.

== Genealogy ==
- Genghis Khan
- Jochi
- Tuqa-Timur
- Urung-Timur (Uz-Timur, Urungbash)
- Achiq
- Taqtaq
- Timur Khwaja
- Badiq
- Urus

== See also ==
- List of khans of the Golden Horde

== Bibliography ==
- "Урус-хан" . Brockhaus and Efron Encyclopedic Dictionary (in Russian). 1906.
- Bosworth, C. E., The New Islamic Dynasties, New York, 1996.
- Desmaisons, P. I. (transl.), Histoire des Mongols et des Tatares par Aboul-Ghâzi Béhâdour Khân, St Petersburg, 1871–1874.
- Gaev, A. G., "Genealogija i hronologija Džučidov," Numizmatičeskij sbornik 3 (2002) 9-55.
- Howorth, H. H. (1880). History of the Mongols from the 9th to the 19th Century. Vol. 2. London.
- Judin, V. P., Utemiš-hadži, Čingiz-name, Alma-Ata, 1992.
- May, T., The Mongol Empire, Edinburgh, 2018.
- Počekaev, R. J., Cari ordynskie: Biografii hanov i pravitelej Zolotoj Ordy. Saint Petersburg, 2010a.
- Počekaev, R. J. (2010b). Mamaj: Istorija “anti-geroja” v istorii. Sankt-Peterburg.
- Sabitov, Ž. M., Genealogija "Tore", Astana, 2008.
- Sagdeeva, R. Z., Serebrjannye monety hanov Zolotoj Ordy, Moscow, 2005.
- Seleznëv, J. V. (2009). Èlita Zolotoj Ordy. Kazan.
- Tizengauzen, V. G. (trans.), Sbornik materialov, otnosjaščihsja k istorii Zolotoj Ordy. Izvlečenija iz arabskih sočinenii, republished as Istorija Kazahstana v arabskih istočnikah. 1. Almaty, 2005.
- Tizengauzen, V. G. (trans.), Sbornik materialov otnosjaščihsja k istorii Zolotoj Ordy. Izvlečenija iz persidskih sočinenii, republished as Istorija Kazahstana v persidskih istočnikah. 4. Almaty, 2006.
- Vernadsky, George (1953), The Mongols and Russia, Yale University Press
- Vohidov, Š. H. (trans.), Istorija Kazahstana v persidskih istočnikah. 3. Muʿizz al-ansāb. Almaty, 2006.

Urus Khan House of Qiyat (1206–1635)
Regnal titles
Preceded by Qutluq Khwaja	Khan of the Blue Horde; 1369–1377	Succeeded by Toqtaqiya
Preceded by Muḥammad-Sulṭān	Khan of the Golden Horde; 1373–1375 (in competition with Muḥammad-Sulṭān, Ḥājjī Cherkes, Īl Beg	Succeeded by Qāghān Beg
