= Chimtay =

Khan of the White Horde from 1344 to 1361

Khan of the Golden Horde Eastern Half (White Horde)
- Reign: 1344–1361
- Predecessor: Ilbasan
- Successor: Urus Khan
- Dynasty: Borjigin
- Religion: Sunni Islam

Chimtay (Turki/Kypchak: چیمتای) was Khan of the White Horde from around 1344 to 1361.

Following his death, he was succeeded by Urus.

== Genealogy ==
- Genghis Khan
- Jochi
- Orda Khan
- Sartaqtay
- Köchü
- Bayan
- Sasibuqa
- Ilbasan
- Chimtay

== See also ==
- List of khans of the Golden Horde

Chimtay House of Borjigin (1206-1635)
Regnal titles
Preceded by Mubarak Khwaja	Khan of the White Horde; 1344–1360	Succeeded by Urus Khan
