= List of khans of the Golden Horde =

This is a complete list of khans of the Ulus of Jochi, better known by its later Russian designation as the Golden Horde, in its right (west) wing and left (east) wing divisions known as the Blue Horde and White Horde, and of its main successor state during a period of disintegration, known as the Great Horde. Khans of the Blue Horde are listed as the principal rulers of the Golden Horde, although many late rulers of the Golden Horde originated from the subordinate White Horde. Following the general convention, the list encompasses the period from the death of Genghis Khan in 1227 to the sack of Sarai by the Crimean Khanate in 1502. The chronological and genealogical information is often incomplete and contradictory; annotation can be found in the secondary lists in the second part of the article, and in the individual articles on specific monarchs.

Western Half (Blue Horde) Ulus of Batu	Eastern Half (White Horde) Ulus of Orda
Jochi جوچى; As deputy of Genghis Khan in Central and Western Asia c. 1207–1227 C.E.
Golden Horde (Ulus of Jochi, Khanate of Qipchāq or Kipchak) طلائی آردا خانان قپچاق قوم جوجی; 1227–1459 C.E.
Batu Khan باتو خان; As overall Khan; 1227–1255 C.E.	Orda Khan آردا خان; 1227–1251 C.E.
Sartaq Khan سارتاق خان; As overall Khan; 1255–1256 C.E.	Qun Quran قن قوران; 1251–1280 C.E.
Ulaqchi Khan اولاقچی خان; As overall Khan; 1256–1257 C.E.	
Berke Khan برکه خان; As overall Khan; 1257–1266 C.E.	
Möngke Temür منگو تیمور; As overall Khan; 1266–1280 C.E.	
Töde Möngke تودا منگو; As overall Khan; 1280–1287 C.E.	Köchü کوجو; 1280–1302 C.E.
Töle Buqa تالابغا; As overall Khan; 1287–1291 C.E.	
Toqta تختا خان; As overall Khan; 1291–1312 C.E.	Buyan or Bayan Khan بیان خان; 1302–1309 C.E.
Muhammad Uzbeg Khan محمد ازبک خان; As overall Khan; 1313–1341 C.E.	Sasibuqa Khan ساسیبوقا خان c. 1310–1320 C.E. (dubious)
	Erzen کلدی بک; 1320–1341 C.E. (dubious)
Tīnī Beg تینی بیگ; As overall Khan; 1341–1342 C.E.	
Jānī Beg جانی بیگ; As overall Khan; 1342–1357 C.E.	Chimtay چمطائي; 1344–1360 C.E. (dubious)
Berdi Beg بردی بیگ; As overall Khan; 1357–1359 C.E.	
Qulpa Khan قلپا خان; As overall Khan; 1359–1360 C.E.	
Nawrūz Beg نوروز بیگ; As overall Khan; 1360 C.E.	
Khiḍr Khan خضر خان ابن ساسیبوقا خان; 1360–1361 C.E.	Qara Nogai; 1360–1361 C.E.
Tīmūr Khwāja تیمور خواجه ابن خضر خان; 1361 C.E.	
Ordu Malik (Ordu Shaykh) اردو ملک شیخ; 1361 C.E.	
Kildi Beg کلدی بک; 1361–1362 C.E.	
ʿAbdallāh Khan عبد اللہ خان ابن ازبک خان; As a puppet Khan under Mamai; 1362 C.E. 1st reign at Sarai	
Murād مراد خان; 1362 C.E.	
Khayr Pūlād (Mīr Pūlād) خیر بولاد; 1362–1364 C.E.	Tughluq Tīmūr; 1363–c. 1365 C.E.
ʿAzīz Shaykh عزیز شیخ; 1364–1367 C.E.	Mubārak Khwāja مبارک خواجہ c. 1365–1369 C.E.
ʿAbdallāh Khan عبد اللہ خان ابن ازبک خان; As a puppet Khan under Mamai; 1367–1368 C.E. 2nd reign at Sarai	
Ūljāy Tīmūr تیمور; 1368 C.E.	
Haṣan Beg حسن بیگ; 1368–1369 C.E.	
ʿAbdallāh Khan عبد اللہ خان ابن ازبک خان; As a puppet Khan under Mamai; 1369 C.E. 3rd reign at Sarai	Qutluq Khwāja; 1369–1370 C.E.
	Urus Khan عروس خان; 1369–1370 C.E.
Tūlūn Beg Khānum تولون بک خانم; As a puppet Queen under Mamai; 1370–1371 C.E.	
Muḥammad-Sulṭān محمد بولاق; As a puppet Khan under Mamai; 1371–1373 C.E. 1st reign at Sarai	
Urus Khan عروس خان; 1373 C.E.
Ḥājjī Cherkes حاجی چرکس; 1373–1374 C.E.	Urus Khan عروس خان; 1373–1374 C.E.
Īl Beg خان ایبک; 1374 C.E.	
Muḥammad-Sulṭān محمد بولاق; As a puppet Khan under Mamai; 1374 C.E. 2nd reign at Sarai	
Urus Khan عروس خان; 1374–1375 C.E.
Qāghān Beg غیاث الدین خاقان بیگ; 1375–1377 C.E.	Urus Khan عروس خان; 1375–1377 C.E.
ʿArab Shāh عرب شاہ مظفر; 1377–1380 C.E.	Toqtaqiya توک تکیا; 1377 C.E.
	Tīmūr Malik تیمور ملک; 1377–1379 C.E.
	Tokhtamysh تختامش خان; 1379–1380 C.E.
Tokhtamysh تختامش خان; As Khan; 1380–1395 C.E.
Quyurchuq قویورچق; 1395–1397 C.E.
Tīmūr Qutluq تیمور قتلغ ابن تیمور ملک; Khan in alliance with Edigu; 1397–1399 C.E.
Shādī Beg شادی بیگ ابن تیمور ملک; Khan in alliance with Edigu; 1399–1407 C.E.
Pūlād Khan بولاد; Khan in alliance with Edigu; 1407–1409 C.E. 1st reign at Sarai
Karīm Berdi کریم بردی ابن تختامش; 1409 C.E. 1st reign at Sarai
Pūlād Khan بولاد; Khan in alliance with Edigu; 1409–1410 C.E. 2nd reign at Sarai
Tīmūr Khan تیمور خان ابن تیمور قتلغ; Khan in alliance with Edigu; 1410–1411 C.E.
Jalāl ad-Din Zeleni Saltan جلال الدین خان ابن تختامش; 1411–1412 C.E.
Karīm Berdi کریم بردی ابن تختامش; 1412–1413 C.E. 2nd reign at Sarai
Kebek قبق خان ابن تختامش; 1413–1414 C.E.
Karīm Berdi کریم بردی ابن تختامش; 1414 C.E. 3rd reign at Sarai
Jabbār Berdi جبار بردی خان; 1414–1415 C.E. 1st reign at Sarai
Chekre چکرہ خان ابن اکمل; Khan in alliance with Edigu; 1415–1416 C.E.
Jabbār Berdi جبار بردی خان; 1416–1417 C.E. 2nd reign at Sarai
Darwīsh درویش خان a puppet Khan of Edigu; 1417–1419 C.E.
Qādir Berdi قدیر بردی خان ابن تختامش; 1419 C.E.
Ḥājjī Muḥammad حاجی محمد خان ابن اغلان علی a puppet Khan of Edigu's sons 1419 C.E.
*Ulugh Muḥammad الغ محمد; 1419–1421 C.E. *Dawlat Berdi دولت بردی; 1419–1421 C.E.
Barāq Khan (His son Jani Beg Khan along with Kerey Khan founded the Kazakh Khanate in 1456) برا‍ق خان بن کویرچک; 1421–1427 C.E.
Ulugh Muḥammad (Founded the Kazan Khanate in 1438) الغ محمد; 1427–1433 C.E.
Sayyid Aḥmad I سید احمد اول; 1433–1435 C.E.
Küchük Muḥammad کوچک محمد; 1435–1459 C.E.
Golden Horde broke up as follows: 1438, Kazan Khanate under Ulugh Muhammad; 1441, Crimean Khanate under Hacı I Giray; Qasim Khanate (1452). The remnant, which became known as the Great Horde, was left with the steppe between the Dnieper and Yaik, the capital Sarai and a claim to represent the tradition of the Golden Horde.
Great Horde عظیم اردو; 1459–1502 C.E.
Maḥmūd (Founded the Khanate of Astrakhan in 1466) محمود بن کوچک; 1459–1465 C.E.
Aḥmad احمد خان; 1465–1481 C.E.
Shaykh Aḥmad سید احمد ثانی; 1481–1502 C.E
The Great Horde collapsed gradually and territories became independent Khanates; 1466, Astrakhan Khanate under one of Kuchuk Muhammed's sons named Mahmud bin Küchük; Tyumen Khanate (1468, later Siberia Khanate).

== Secondary list with short biographies ==
The following is a detailed annotated list intended mainly as an index to the linked articles. It is based primarily on Baumer 2016, Gaev 2002, Grigor'ev 1983, Howorth 1880, Počekaev 2010, and Sabitov 2008 and 2014. Name forms, encountered in much variation and inconsistency, are standardized on the basis of Biran 1997 and Bosworth 1996.

=== Western half of the Golden Horde (1226–1362) ===
- 1 Chinggis Khan 1206–1227, founded Mongol empire, got about as far as the Volga
- The generals Subutai and Jebe 1219–1223 led raid clockwise around the Caspian, defeated Rus at Battle of Kalka River
- 2 Jochi c. 1208–1227, 1st son of Genghis Khan (1), given west, predeceased father, ancestor of the khans of the Golden Horde.
- 3 Batu Khan 28Y, 1227–1255, son of Jochi (2), 1236–42 conquered Russia and Ukraine, c 1250 founded capital Sarai on lower Volga.
- 3a Orda Khan, elder brother of Batu (3), held east, see A below.
- 3b Shiban ?–?, younger brother of Batu (3), held area north of Aral/Caspian between Batu and Orda, descendants (Shaybanids) important.
- 3c Tuqa-Timur ?–?, younger brother of Batu (3), descendants (Tuqa-Timurids) important.
- 4 Sartaq Khan 1Y, 1256–1257, son of Batu (3), most of short reign spent travelling to great khan in Mongolia.
- 5 Ulaghchi, 1257, brother (less likely son) of Sartaq (4), 10 years old.
- 6 Berke 9Y, 1257–1266, younger brother of Batu (3), clashed with Hulagu Khan of Persia and allied with Mamluks, died while fighting Hulagu's son, first Muslim khan but did not enforce conversion to Islam.
- 7 Möngke Temür 14Y, 1266–1280, son of Toghan, son of Batu (3), non-Muslim, established trade with Genoese at Kaffa; effectively autonomous from the great khan Qubilai from 1269.
- 7a Nogai Khan c. 1266–1299, son of Bo'al, son of Tatar, 7th son of Jochi (2); under Batu guarded western frontier, invaded Poland, helped Berke (6) fight Hulagu, 1265 invaded Balkans, 1266 possibly a de facto ruler west of the Dnieper, c. 1280 killed Bulgarian emperor, 1285 he and Talabuga invaded Hungary, 1287 raided Poland, then Circassia, killed in battle by Toqta (10), son fled to Bulgaria, sometimes considered its emperor.
- 8 Töde Möngke 7Y, 1280–1287, brother of Mengu-Timur (7), pious Muslim, weak, removed by Talabuga likely with assistance of Nogai.
- 9 Talabuga Khan 4Y, 1287–1291, son of Tartu, the brother of Mengu-Timur (7), overthrew Töde Möngke and fought alongside Nogai. Asserted himself, raided Lithuania, Poland, and Circassia, and put down the Rostov uprising. Ultimately assassinated by men of Nogai (10).
- 10 Toqta 23Y, 1291–1312, the son of Mengu-Timur (7), installed by Nogai, 1300 killed Nogai, quarreled with Genoese at Kaffa.
- 11 Öz Beg 27Y, 1314–1341, son of Toghrilcha, the son of Mengu-Timur (7), first to actively support Islam, fought and made peace with Persia, appointed Ivan Kalita chief tax collector.
- 12 Tīnī Beg 1Y, 1341–1342, son of Öz Beg (11), killed by Jani Beg (13).
- 13 Jānī Beg 15Y, 1342–1357, brother of Tini Beg (12), lost land in the west, took Tabriz, his 1347 siege of Kaffa spread the black death to Europe.
- The Black Death would have impacted the steppe about this time, but there are few records.
- 14 Berdi Beg 2Y, 1357–1359, son and possibly murderer of Jānī Beg (13), eliminated his close kinsmen, murdered? End of the Line of Batu (3).
- 15 Qulpa 1Y, 1359–1360, possibly pretended son of Jānī Beg (13), murdered.
- 16 Nawrūz Beg (= ? Bazarchi) 1360 pretended son of Öz Beg (11) or Jānī Beg (13), killed.
- 17 Khiḍr Khan, 1360–1361, son of Mangqutay, the son of Tula-Buqa, the son of Qadaq, the son Shiban (3b), murdered.
- 18 Tīmūr Khwāja, 1361, son and murderer of Khiḍr Khan (17), killed.
- "Great Disorder" 1361–1380, period of chronic civil war among contending factions. According to Baumer between Berdi Beg and Tokhtamiysh there were 19 khans, at least 8 puppets of Mamai. In reality, only 4 rulers were Mamai's protégés.
- Warlord Mamai 1361–1380/1381 started in Crimea, supported various khans, occasionally asserting control over capital Sarai, lost territory to Lithuania, Moscow stopped paying tribute, 1380 defeated by Russians at the Battle of Kulikovo, same year defeated by Tokhtamysh, fled to the Crimea and was eventually eliminated by Tokhtamysh's agents.
- 19 Ordu Malik, 1361, probably son of Īl-Tūtār, the son of Dānishmand, the son of Bayan, the son of Tuqa-Timur (3c); murdered.
- 20 Kildi Beg, 1361–1362, pretended son of Jānī Beg (13); killed.

==== "Sarai Horde" (Right bank of the Volga) (1362–1399) ====
(Chronology according to Grigor'ev 1983)

- 21G ʿAbdallāh = 21M, 1362, probably the son of Minkasar, the son of Abay, the son of Kay-Timur, the son of Tuqa-Timur (3c); protégé of Mamai, expelled.
- 22G Murād, 1362, brother of Khiḍr Khan (17), expelled (rival khan at Gülistan 1361–1364).
- 23G Khayr Pūlād or Mīr Pūlād, 1362–1364, son of Ming-Timur, the son of Badaqul, the son of Jochi-Buqa, the son of Bahadur, the son of Shiban (3b); expelled? (rival khan at Gülistan as Pūlād Khwāja 1364–1367?).
- 24G ʿAzīz Shaykh, 1364–1367, probably son of Tun Khwāja, the son of Baliq, the son of Buralday, the son of Qutluq-Timur, the son of Salghan, the son of Shiban (3b); murdered.
- 25G ʿAbdallāh = 21M, 1367–1368, restored as protégé of Mamai, expelled
- 26G Ūljāy Tīmūr or Pūlād Tīmūr, 1368, probably = Tīmūr Beg, son of Qutluq Tīmūr, the son of Numqan, the son of Abay, the son of Kay-Timur, the son of Tuqa-Timur (3c); protégé of Ḥājjī Cherkes of Astrakhan, expelled.
- 27G Ḥasan Beg, 1368–1369, son of Beg-Qundi, the brother of Khayr Pūlād (23G), expelled, killed?.
- 28G ʿAbdallāh = 21M, 1369–1370, restored protégé of Mamai
- 29G Tūlūn Beg Khānum, 1370–1371, probably daughter of Berdi Beg (14) and wife of Mamai, his protégé at Sarai.
- 30G Muḥammad-Sulṭān = 22M, 1371–1373, probably son of ʿAbdallāh (21/25/28G), protégé of Mamai, expelled.
- 31G Urus Khan, 1373, = I below, son of Bādāq, the son of Tīmūr Khwāja, the son of Tāqtāq, the 2nd son of Achiq, the son of Urungbāsh (Urung-Timur), the 3rd son of Tuqa-Timur (3c); not a descendant of Orda (3a), as claimed in older scholarship and its derivatives; expelled.
- 32G Cherkes Beg, 1373–1374, pretended son of Jānī Beg (13), protégé of or identical with Ḥājjī Cherkes of Astrakhan, expelled.
- 33G Īl Beg, 1374, brother of Khayr Pūlād (23G).
- 34G Muḥammad-Sulṭān = 22M, 1374, restored as protégé of Mamai, expelled.
- 35G Urus Khan, 1374–1375 = I below, restored, expelled, died 1377.
- 36G Qāghān Beg, 1375–1377, son of Īl Beg (33G), abdicated.
- 37G ʿArab Shāh, 1377–1380, son of Khayr Pūlād (23G), abdicated.
- Tokhtamysh, 1380–1399, = L below, son of Tuy Khwāja, the son of Qutluq Khwāja, the son of Kuyuchak, the son of Saricha, the son of Ūrungbāsh (Urung-Timur), the 3rd son of Tuqa-Timur (3c); came from east and united two halves of the Horde, originally a protégé of Timur (Tamerlane), later fell out with him and was driven out by Edigu (who now had Timur's support).

(Alternative chronology according to Sidorenko 2000)

- 21S Khayr Pūlād or Mīr Pūlād, 1362–1364, descendant of Shiban (3b) as above; expelled? (possibly rival khan at Gülistan as Pūlād Khwāja 1364?).
- 22S ʿAbdallāh, 1362–1365, probably descendant of Tuqa-Timur (3c), as above; protégé of Mamai, expelled.
- 23S ʿAzīz Shaykh, 1365–1367, probably descendant of Shiban (3b), as above; murdered (earlier rival khan at Gülistan 1364–1365).
- 24S Ūljāy Tīmūr or Pūlād Tīmūr, 1367, probably descendant of Tuqa-Timur (3c), as above.
- Following this, Sidorenko 2000 does not provide a continuous sequence of khans, since he limits his analysis to explicitly labeled coinage; he dates Tulun Beg Khanum to 1371/1372, Īl Beg to 1373/1374 (at Saray-Jük), Cherkes Beg to 1374/1375 (at Astrakhan), and then Qāghān Beg 1375–1377 and ʿArab Shāh 1377–1380, as above.

==== "Mamai's Horde" (Left bank of the Volga) (1362–1380) ====
- 21M ʿAbdallāh = 21/25/28G, 1362–1370, probably descendant of Tuqa-Timur (3c), as above; protégé of Mamai.
- 22M Muḥammad-Sulṭān = 30/34G; 1370–1379, probably son of ʿAbdallāh (21M); protégé of Mamai, murdered by him?
- 23M Tūlāk, 1379–1380, probably son of Tughluq Khwāja, the brother of ʿAbdallāh (21M); protégé of Mamai, killed at the Battle of Kulikovo?
- In older scholarship and its derivatives Muḥammad-Sulṭān and Tūlāk were erroneously treated as single individual, supposedly named Muḥammad-Būlāq; the distinction between them is established by Sidorenko 2000: 278–280, Gaev 2002: 23–25, and others.

=== Eastern half of the Golden Horde (1227–1380) ===
Between 1242 and 1380 the eastern and western halves of the horde were generally separate, the dividing line being somewhere north of the Caspian, perhaps the Ural. The relation between the two is not always clear, but the rulers of the Eastern half generally recognized the superior authority of those of the Western half. In the late 14th century, the Eastern half's rulers I. and L. attempted, at times successfully, to take over the Western half. The western khans had a capital at Sarai on the lower Volga while the eastern khans had capitals or winter camps on the Syr Darya, especially Sighnaq. Most rulers of the Eastern half are poorly documented, and historiography still largely relies on the treatment by Hammer-Purgstall 1840, who had access to what are now considered unreliable sources, like versions of the account of Muʿīn-ad-Dīn Naṭanzī (earlier known as the "Anonymous of Iskandar"). What became the traditional account, therefore, relies on Naṭanzī and his derivatives to construct (through additional rationalization) a continuous succession of khans from Orda (3a/A) to Urus Khan (I) and Tokhtamysh (L). While it is clear that the traditional chronology and genealogy are very flawed, they have enjoyed a lasting and pervasive influence in historiography, appearing even in recent publications, such as Bosworth 1996 and Baumer 2016. For discussion, see Vásáry 2009.

(Chronology and genealogy according to Hammer-Purgstall 1840)

- A Orda Khan 28Y, c1227–1251, held East under his younger brother Batu (3), who ruled West, also general in western campaigns
- B Qun Quran 29Y, 1251–c. 1280, fourth son of Orda (A), little information (Baumer has Qongqiran >1255–<77)
- C Köchü 22Y, c1280–1302 grandson of Orda (A), peaceful reign (Baumer: Qonichi c1277–<1299)
- D Bayan 7Y, 1302–09, son of Köchü (C), fought his cousin Kobluk/Kupalak who allied with Kaidu to the east (Baumer has <1299–<1312)
- E Sasibuqa 6Y, 1309–15, son of Bayan (D), resisted Uzbeg Khan (11 above). (Baumer has Sasi Buqa <1312–1320/21)
- F Ebisan 5Y, 1310/15–1320, son of Sasibuqa (E), probably gained land in southeast (Otrar) recognized overlordship of Uzbek (Baumer has Izran 1320/21–?)
- G Mubārak Khwāja 24Y, 1320–44, brother of Ilbasan (F), little information (Baumer has ?–1344)
- H Chimtay 16Y, 1344–1360, son of Ilbasan (F), little information (Baumer: 1344?–61)
- The Black Death would have hit the steppe about this time, but there are few records.
- I Urus Khan 15Y, 1361–1376, son of Chimtay (H); (supposedly) uncle of Tokhtamysh (L); fought Tokhtamysh and Tamerlane, 1373 and 1374–1375 briefly held Western wing of the Golden Horde (Baumer:1361–74/75)
- J Toqtaqiya 0Y, 1377, son of Urus (I), two-month reign, Baumer has him defeated by Tokhtamysh
- K Tīmūr Malik 1Y, 1377–78, son of Urus (I), killed by Tokhtamysh (L).
- L Tokhtamysh 21Y, 1378–1395, son of Tuy Khwāja, (supposedly) the brother of Urus (I); a great man but more warlord than ruler, rebelled against his uncle Urus (I), fled to Tamerlane who in 1378 made him khan of the Horde, 1380 crossed Volga and defeated Mamai joining the two halves of the Golden Horde, burned Moscow to avenge Mamai's defeat at Kulikovo, broke with Tamerlane, captured Tabriz and withdrew, Tamerlane defeated him on the Volga in 1391 and on the Terek in 1395 and razed his cities north of the Caspian, fled to Lithuania, defeated by Tamerlane's general Edigu, fled to Siberia and was killed by Edigu's men.

(Revised chronology and genealogy according to Vásáry 2009)

Driven by a better understanding of the coinage of Mubārak Khwāja (issued in 1366–1368, not, as previously assumed, 40 or 30 years earlier), of Naṭanzī's limitations as a source on the subject, and of more reliable sources on the chronology and genealogy of Mongol rulers, Vásáry 2009 proposed the following reconstruction, some of it already anticipated by, e.g., Gaev 2002.

- V1 Orda, 1st son of Jochi (2)
- V2 Qongkiran, 4th son of Orda (V1)
- V3 Qonichi, 1st son of Sartaqtay, the 1st son of Orda (V1)
- V4 Bayan, 1st son of Qonichi (V3)
- V5 Sasi-Buqa, c. 1310–1320/1321, 2nd son of Bayan (V4)
- V6 Erzen, 1320/1321–1344/1345, son of Sasi-Buqa (V5)
- V7 Chimtay, 1344/1345–1360/1361, son of Erzen (V6)
- V8 Qara Nogai, 1360/1361–1363, 2nd son of Sasi, the 1st son of Toqanchar, the 1st son of Bay-Timur, the 1st son of Tuqa-Timur (3c), the 13th son of Jochi (2)
- V9 Tughluq Timur, 1363–?, brother, as the 1st son of Sasi
- V10 Mubārak Khwāja, ?–1369, cousin, as the 1st son of Boz Qulaq, the 2nd son of Toqanchar
- V11 Qutluq Khwāja, 1369, cousin, as the 3rd son of Sasi
- V12 Urus Khan, 1369–1377, son of Badiq, descendant of Tuqa-Timur (3c)

(Revised chronology and genealogy according to Sabitov 2014)

Sabitov 2014 likewise established a substantial revision to the list of rulers of the Eastern half of the Golden Horde, based on the Muʿizz al-ansāb, the Tawārīḫ-i guzīdah-i nuṣrat-nāmah, and the Čingīz-Nāmah. Unlike Vásáry, Sabitov did not attempt to continue a succession of khans descended from Orda beyond what was verifiable from reliable sources, and he showed that Orda's lineage lost its authority by 1330, when Öz Beg Khan of the Western half appointed his own non-Jochid governor over the Eastern half, a member of the Kiyat clan, and the Eastern half had khans of its own again only after 1360. The list after 1330 follows Gaev 2002: 10–15 and Sabitov 2008: 286.

- S1 Orda 1227–1252/1253, 1st son of Jochi (2).（1204-1252/1253）
- S2 Qongkiran, 1252/3–1280, 4th son of Orda (S1).（1230-1280）
- S3 Qutuqu, ruling in 1262/1263, 2nd son of Orda (S1)（？-？）
- S4 Qonichi, by the 1280s–1301/1302, 1st son of Sartaqtay, the 1st son of Orda (S1).（1250-1301/1302）
- S5 Kubluk, 1301/1302, 1st son of Tīmūr-Buqa, the son of Qutuqu, 2nd son of Orda (S1) killed.（？-1302）
- S6 Bayan, 1301/1302–1309, 1st son of Qonichi (S4).（1275-1309）
- S7 Mangitay, 1308/1309–1318/1319, 4th son of Qonichi (S4).（1290-1318/1319）
- S7a Kushtay, 1302-1308/1309, son of Kubluk, rival khan（？-1310）
- S8 Sasi（Sasi-Buqa）, c. 1319-1320/1321, 1st son of Toqanchar, the 1st son of Bay-Timur，the 1st son of Tuqa-Timur.（？-？）
- S9 Kalak, 1320/1321–1328/1330, son of Mangitay (S7)（1319/1320-1330）
- S10 Kiyat governor Isatay（？-1342）, by 1330, appointed by Öz Beg Khan (11).
- S10a Erzen, 1330–1344/1345, 1st son of Sasi(s8)（？-1344/1345）
- S11 Kiyat governor Jir-Qutlu（？-1357/1359）, son of Isatay (S10), murdered by the future Urus Khan (S17).
- S11a Chimtay（？-1360）, 1344/1345–1360, son of Erzen （S10a）
- S12 Kiyat governor Tingiz-Buqa, 1357–1360, son of Jir-Qutlu (S11), murdered by Qara Nogai (S13).
- S13 Qara Nogai（？-1363）, 1360–1363, 2nd son of Sasi, the 1st son of Toqanchar, the 1st son of Bay-Timur, the 1st son of Tuqa-Timur, the 13th son of Jochi (2); reasserted the autonomy of the Eastern half under khans of its own.
- S14 Tughluq Tīmūr（？-1365）, 1363–1365, nephew, as the son of Bujqaq, the 4th son of Sasi.
- S15 Mubārak Khwāja（？-1369）, 1365–1369, cousin, as the 1st son of Boz Qulaq, the 2nd son of Toqanchar.
- S16 Qutluq Khwāja（？-1369）, 1369, cousin, as the 3rd son of Sasi.
- S17 Urus Khan（1315/1325-1377）, 1369–1377, son of Bādāq, the son of Tīmūr Khwāja, the son of Tāqtāq, the 2nd son of Achiq, the son of Urungbāsh (Urung-Timur), the 3rd son of Tuqa-Timur (3c).
- S18 Toqtaqiya（？-1377）, 1377, 2nd son of Urus, for 2 months.
- S19 Tīmūr Malik（？-1379）, 1377–1379, 3rd son of Urus.
- S20 Tokhtamysh（1342-1406）, 1379–1395, son of Tuy Khwāja, the son of Qutluq Khwāja, the son of Kuyuchak, the son of Saricha, the son of Urungbāsh (Urung-Timur), the 3rd son of Tuqa-Timur (3c). His conquest of Sarai in 1380 and elimination of Mamai in 1380/1381 led to a temporary reunification and relative stabilization of the Golden Horde.

=== After Tokhtamysh (1380–1502) ===
Following Tokhtamysh there was no longer a clear distinction between east and west. For the first twenty years power was held by descendants of Urus Khan and Tohktamysh and by the warlord Edigu. There was then a confused period, followed by several long reigns. The last khan was deposed in 1502. The Golden horde broke up as follows: before 1400: Lithuania expanded as far east as Kiev, ?: Kursk as Lithuanian vassal, c 1430: land east of the Ural held by Abul Khayr, 1438: Kazan (by T11), 1449: Crimea (family of 3c), 1452: Kasimov as Russian vassal (family of 3c), 1465: Kazakh khanate (sons of T12), 1466: Astrakhan (T15), 1480: Russia, before 1490?: Sibir. The steppe nomads then became organized as the Nogai Horde.

- T1 Tokhtamysh, 1380–1397 = L/S20 above, son of Tuy Khwāja, the son of Qutluq Khwāja, the son of Kuyuchak, the son of Saricha, the son of Ūrungbāsh (Urung-Timur), the 3rd son of Tuqa-Timur (3c).
- Warlord Edigu c. 1396–1410 ruled Volga-Ural area, 1399 defeated T1, 1406 his men killed T1, 1407 raided Volga Bulgaria, 1408 raided Russia, 1410 dethroned, fled east, returned to Serai, 1419 mortally wounded against Qādir Berdi (T17). According to Baumer in 1410 he was driven out by one of his sons after which 9 khans followed in 9 years.
- T1a Quyurchuq, 1395–1397, son of Urus Khan (I/S17).
- T1b Tāsh-Tīmūr, 1395–1396, son of Jansa, the son of Tūlāk-Tīmūr, the son of Kuyunchak, the son of Saricha, the son of Urung-Timur, the son of Tuqa-Timur (3c); rival khan in the Crimea.
- T2 Tīmūr Qutluq, 1397–1399, son of Tīmūr Beg, the son of Qutluq-Tīmūr, the son of Numqan, the son of Abay, the son of Kay-Timur, the son of Tuqa-Timur (3c); cousin, not son of Timur Malik (K/S19); real power was exercised by Edigu, who enthroned Tīmūr Qutluq after Tokhtamysh's defeat.
- T2a Tokhtamysh, 1397, briefly restored, then expelled; rival khan in Sibir until death in 1406.
- T3 Shādī Beg, 1399–1407, son of Qutlu-Beg, son of Qutluq-Tīmūr, the son of Numqan, the son of Abay, the son of Kay-Timur, the son of Tuqa-Timur (3c); cousin, not brother of Tīmūr Qutluq (T2); protégé of Edigu, fled to Shirvan.
- T4 Pūlād, 1407–1410, son of Tīmūr Qutluq (T2); cousin, not son of Shādī Beg; protégé of Edigu, expelled.
- T5 Karīm Berdi, 1409, son of Tokhtamysh (T1), seized Sarai, expelled.
- T6 Pūlād, 1407–1410: 2nd reign; recalled Edigu from siege of Moscow.
- T7 Tīmūr, 1410–1412, son of Tīmūr Qutluq (T2); overthrew Edigu, expelled and killed.
- T8 Jalāl ad-Dīn, 1411–1412, eldest son of Tokhtamysh (T1), expelled and killed Tīmūr (T7), Lithuanian protégé, murdered by a brother.
- T9 Karīm Berdi, 1412–1413: 2nd reign; anti-Lithuanian, killed pro-Lithuanian rival khan "Betsabul" = ? Kebek (T10); deposed.
- T10 Kebek (= ? "Betsabul"), 1414, son of Tokhtamysh (T1), Lithuanian protégé, killed.
- T11 Karīm Berdi, 1414: 3rd reign; deposed, killed by brother Jabbār Berdi (T12/14) in 1417?
- T12 Jabbār Berdi, 1414–1415, son of Tokhtamysh (T1), Lithuanian protégé, deposed.
- T13 Chekre, 1415–1416, son of Aqmil, the son of Minkasar, the son of Abay, the son of Kay-Timur, the son of Tuqa-Timur (3c); he and servant Johann Schiltberger went to Siberia with Edigu (earliest European report of Siberia); protégé of Edigu from 1414 as competitor to Kebek (T10), reigned 9 months, interrupting reign of Jabbār Berdi (T12/14), expelled or killed.
- T14 Jabbār Berdi, 1416–1417: 2nd reign; deposed and killed.
- T15 Sayyid Aḥmad (I), 1417, protégé of Edigu, inexperienced, deposed after 45 days? Either son of Karīm Berdi (T5/9/11) and thus grandson, not son of Tokhtamysh (T1), or cousin of Chekre (T13), as son of Mamkī, the son of Minkasar.
- T15a Ghiyāth ad-Dīn I, 1416, son of Tāsh Tīmūr (T1b); Lithuanian protégé, killed against Sayyid Aḥmad (T15).
- T16 Darwīsh, 1417–1419, son of Alti Qurtuqa, the son of Mamkī, the son of Minkasar; protégé of Edigu, killed?
- T17 Qādir Berdi, 1419, son of Tokhtamysh (T1), killed against Edigu, who also perished.
- T17a Beg Ṣūfī, 1419–1421, enthroned by Edigu as competitor to Qādir Berdi (T17), later Lithuanian protégéin the Crimea. Either son of Tāsh Tīmūr (T1b), or son of Beg Tūt, the son of Dānishmand, the son of Bayan, the son of Tuqa Timur (3c).
- T18 Ḥājjī Muḥammad, 1419–1423, son of ʿAlī, the brother of Ḥasan Beg (27G), a descendant of Shiban (3b); protégé of Edigu's son Manṣūr, killed by Barāq (T19). Note: there is much confusion between at least three khans competing for power in this period, all named Muḥammad and not always sufficiently distinguished from each other in the sources: Ḥājjī Muḥammad (T18), (Muḥammad) Barāq (T19), and Ulugh Muḥammad (T21/23).
- T19 Barāq, 1423–1425, son of Quyurchuq (T1a); Timurid protégé in the east since 1419, expelled by Ghiyāth ad-Dīn II (T20) 1425, defeated by Ulugh Muḥammad (T21) 1426 and expelled from Sarai, but retained control in the east (where he defeated the Timurid Ulugh Beg but was contained by Shah Rukh) until killed against (apparently) Küchük Muḥammad (T24) in 1428. Father of Jānī-Beg Abū-Saʿīd, the ancestor of Kazakh khans.
- T19a Khudāydād, rival khan 1422–1424, son of ʿAli, the brother of Tāsh Tīmūr (T1b); anti-Lithuanian; 1422 defeated by Barāq (T19), 1424 failed to take Odoyev, last mentioned 1425.
- T20 Ghiyāth ad-Dīn II, 1425–1426, son of Shādī Beg (T3); rival khan at Azov 1421, later protégé of Edigu's son Manṣūr from 1423, expelled by Ulugh Muḥammad (T21) in 1426, ensconced at Kazan, briefly ruler at Sarai in 1437.
- T21 Ulugh Muḥammad, 1426–1428, son of Ḥasan, the brother of Tāsh Tīmūr (T1b); possibly set up by opponents of Edigu's sons as early as 1419/1420; Lithuanian protégé in the Crimea 1424; expelled by Dawlat Berdi (T22) or Barāq (T19) in 1428 or 1427.
- T22 Dawlat Berdi, 1428, son of Tāsh Tīmūr (T1b); Lithuanian protégé in the Crimea 1421–1424 and 1426–1428; expelled by Ulugh Muḥammad (T21/23) 1424, restored 1426, seized Sarai 1427 or 1428, died or killed later the same year.
- T23 Ulugh Muḥammad, 1428–1436: 2nd reign; recovered Sarai 1427 or 1428; defeated Sayyid Aḥmad I (II) in 1432, divided Golden Horde with Küchük Muḥammad (T24) in 1433 (keeping west), expelled by Sayyid Aḥmad I (II) (T24) in 1436, defeated Vasilij II Vasil'evič of Moscow in 1437, founded Khanate of Kazan 1438, besieged Moscow 1439, died 1445, allegedly killed by son Maḥmūd; another son, Qāsim, founded the Khanate of Kasimov.
- T23a Jūmādaq, 1426–1428, son of Ṣūfī, the son of Bābā, the son of Suyūnch Bāy, the son of Suyūnch Tīmūr, the brother of Īl Beg (33G); khan in Sibir and the east.
- T23b Maḥmūd Khwāja, 1428–1430, son of Qāghān Beg (36G); khan in Sibir and the east.
- T23c Khiḍr, 1428–1429, son of Ibrāhīm, the brother of ʿArab Shāh (37G); khan in Sibir and the east.
- T23d Abu'l-Khayr Khan, 1429–1431, son of Dawlat Shaykh, the brother of Khiḍr (T23c); khan in Sibir and the east, later founder of the Uzbek Khanate, died 1469.
- T23e Maḥmūdāq, 1431–1464, son of Ḥājjī Muḥammad (T18); khan in Sibir and the east, his line continued as rulers of the Khanate of Sibir.
- T24 Küchük Muḥammad, 1433–1459, son of Tīmūr (T7); claimant in east as protégé of Edigu's son Ghāzī since c. 1427, killed and replaced Barāq (T19) in 1428, divided Golden Horde with Ulugh Muḥammad (T21/23) in 1433 (getting Volga and the east) with Astrakhan, defeated Ulugh Muḥammad in 1437, took over Azov (as witnessed by Giosafat Barbaro and the Crimea 1438, ruled also between the Don and Kazakhstan steppe.
- T25 Sayyid Aḥmad I (II), 1436–1452, son of Beg Ṣūfī (T17a); 1432 declared khan in the Crimea but defeated and captured by Ulugh Muḥammad (T21/23), sent as hostage to Lithuania, protégé of the Lithuanian faction of Švitrigaila 1433, expelled Ulugh Muḥammad 1436, ruled between the Dnieper and the Don, raided Russia, lost Crimea 1441, in 1452 attacked by Khan Ḥājjī Girāy I of Crimea (T25a), fled to Kiev, captured by Lithuanians and 'died miserably' at Kovno (in 1455/65?).
- T25a Ḥājjī Girāy I, 1441–1466, son of Ghiyāth ad-Dīn I (T15a); rival khan intermittently since 1428, founded Crimean Khanate.
- T26 Maḥmūd, 1459–1471, son of Küchük Muḥammad (T24); at Astrakhan: often considered founder of the Khanate of Astrakhan (inherited by his son Qāsim), defeated by Ḥājjī Girāy I of Crimea (T25a) in 1465.
- T27 Aḥmad, 1465–1481 son of Küchük Muḥammad (T24); at Sarai; warred with the Uzbeks and lost Russia in 1480, killed by Khan Ibāq of Sibir and the Nogais.
- T28 Shaykh Aḥmad, 1481–1493 and 1494–1502, son of Aḥmad (T27); in association and/or competition with his brothers and cousins, briefly deposed in favor of Murtaḍā (T30), then restored, defeated and expelled by Manglī Girāy I of Crimea 1502, fled to Astrakhan, then Lithuania, where he was held captive, released 1527, briefly khan at Astrakhan, died 1528.
- T29 Sayyid Aḥmad II (III), 1485–1502, son of Aḥmad (T27); rival of Shaykh Aḥmad (T28), overran the Crimea as associate of Murtaḍā (T30) 1486, became associate of Shaykh Aḥmad by 1490, until they quarreled in 1501, last mentioned 1504.
- T30 Murtaḍā, 1486–1494, son of Aḥmad (T27); rival of Shaykh Aḥmad (T28) as associate of Sayyid Aḥmad II (III) (T29), then on his own, briefly displaced Shaykh Aḥmad in 1493–1494, deposed; also in Astrakhan, died 1499 or after 1514.
- Sack of Sarai by Khan Manglī Girāy I of Crimea in 1502: end of the "Great Horde"; overall, the Golden Horde had already disintegrated in the 1420s–1460s.

== Genealogy of House of Jochi ==
House of Borjigin

Mongol Empire
Golden Horde
Great Horde
White Horde (Debatable)
Blue Horde (Debatable)
Uzbek Khanate
Kazan Khanate
Crimean Khanate
Qasim Khanate
Astrakhan Khanate
Tyumen Khanate
Sibir Khanate
Kazakh Khanate
Senior Zhuz
Middle Zhuz
Junior Zhuz
Bukhara Khanate
Khiva Khanate
Bujaq Horde
Bukay Horde
Second Bulgarian Empire
Tsardom of Russia

Temüjin r. 1206–1227
Jochi r. 1225–1227
Orda r. 1242–1251	Batu r. 1242–1255 r. 1227–1255	Berke r. 1257–1267 r. 1257–1267	Shiban	Buwal	Tuqa-Timur
Sartaqtay	Qun-Quran r. 1251–1280	Sartaq r. 1255–1257 r. 1255–1257	Tuqan	Ulaghchi r. 1257–1257 r. 1257–1257	Bahadur	Salghan	Qadaq	Tutar	Bay-Timur	Bayan	Urung-Timur	Kay-Timur
Kuchu r. 1280–1302	Tartu	Möngke-Timur r. 1267–1280 r. 1267–1280	Tuda-Möngke r. 1280–1287 r. 1280–1287	Jochi-Buqa	Qutluq-Timur	Tula-Buqa	Nughay	Tuqanchar	Danishmand	Achiq	Saricha	Abay
Bayan r. 1302–1309	Tula-Buqa r. 1287–1290 r. 1287–1290	Tughrilcha	Tuqta r. 1290–1312 r. 1290–1312	Badaqul	Bayanchar	Buralday	Mangqutay	Chaka r. 1299–1300	Sasi	Burqulaq	Il-Tutar	Taqtaq	Kuyunchak	Numqan	Minkasar
Sasi-Buqa r. 1309–1320	Öz-Beg r. 1313–1341 r. 1313–1341	Ilbarsmish r. 1312–1313 r. 1312–1313	Munke-Timur-Khwaja	Ghazan	Baliq	Khidr r. 1359–1361 r. 1360–1361	Murad r. 1361–1364 r. 1362–1362	Qara-Nughay r. 1361–1363	Buchqaq	Qutluq-Khwaja r. 1368–1368	Mubarak-Khwaja r. 1365–1368	Ordu-Malik r. 1360–1361 r. 1361–1361	Timur-Khwaja	Qutluq-Khwaja	Tulak-Timur	Qutluq-Timur	Abdullah r. 1361–1370 r. 1362–1362, 1367–1368 r. 1369–1370	Tughluq-Khwaja	Aqmil	Mamki
Ilbasan r. 1320–1344	Tini-Beg r. 1341–1342 r. 1341–1342	Jani-Beg r. 1342–1357 r. 1342–1357	Khayr-Pulad r. 1361–1367 r. 1362–1364	Tuy-Khwaja	Il-Beg r. 1374–1374 r. 1374–1374	Suyunch-Timur	Aq-Birdi	Tun-Khwaja	Timur-Khwaja r. 1361–1361 r. 1361–1361	Tughluq-Timur r. 1363–1365	Badiq	Tuy-Khwaja	Janisa	Uljay-Timur r. 1368–1368 r. 1368–1368	Qutlu-Beg	Muhammad-Sultan r. 1370–1379 r. 1370–1373, 1374–1374	Tulak r. 1379–1380 r. 1380–1380	Chakrah r. 1413–1416	Sayyid-Ahmad I r. 1416–1416	Alti-Qurtuqa
Chimtay r. 1344–1361	Qulpa r. 1359–1360 r. 1359–1360	Nawruz-Beg r. 1360–1360 r. 1360–1360	Birdi-Beg r. 1357–1359 r. 1357–1359	Kildi-Beg r. 1361–1362 r. 1361–1362	Charkas-Beg r. 1359–1375 r. 1373–1374	Ibrahim	Arab-Shah r. 1374–1380 r. 1377–1380	Hasan-Beg r. 1367–1370 r. 1368–1369	Tokhtamysh	Qaghan-Beg r. 1374–1377 r. 1375–1377	Suyunch-Beg	Musa	Aziz-Shaykh r. 1364–1367 r. 1364–1367	Urus r. 1368–1377 r. 1373–1373, 1374–1375	Tuqtamish r. 1378–1380 r. 1380–1406	Tash-Timur r. 1392–1395	Ali	Hasan	Timur-Qutluq r. 1395–1399	Shadi-Beg r. 1399–1406	Darwish r. 1416–1419
Tulun-Beg r. 1370–1370 r. 1370–1370	Dawlat-Shaykh r. 1423–1425	Tughluq-Hajji	Hajji-Muhammad r. 1419–1423	Mahmud-Khwaja r. 1428–1431	Baba	Mustafa II r. 1440–1446 r. 1458–1460	Tuqtaqiya r. 1377–1377	Timur-Malik r. 1377–1378	Quyurchuq r. 1395–1395	Jalal ad-Din r. 1411–1412	Karim-Birdi r. 1409–1409, 1412–1414	Kebek r. 1413–1414	Jabbar-Birdi r. 1414–1416	Qadir-Birdi r. 1419–1419	Ghiyath ad-Din I r. 1416–1416	Beg-Sufi r. 1419–1421	Dawlat-Birdi r. 1419–1423, 1426–1428	Khudaidad r. 1423–1423	Ulugh Muhammad r. 1419–1423, 1425–1438 r. 1438–1445	Pulad r. 1406–1410	Timur r. 1410–1411	Ghiyath ad-Din II r. 1421–1428, 1431–1438
Abu'l-Khayr r. 1428–1428 r. 1428–1468	Timur-Shaykh	Mahmud	Sufi r. 1425–1426	Beg-Pulad r. 1391–1392	Anika-Pulad	Baraq r. 1419–1428	Hajji I r. 1428–1429, 1431–1434 r. 1441–1456, 1456–1466	Sayyid-Ahmad II r. 1433–1455	Mahmud r. 1445–1465	Qasim r. 1445–1469	Kichik Muhammad r. 1428–1459	Mustafa I r. 1431–1433
Shah-Budaq	Shaykh-Haydar r. 1468–1472	Kuchkunchi-Muhammad r. 1512–1530	Suyunch-Khwaja r. 1511–1512	Khwaja-Muhammad	Yadigar r. 1468–1468	Ibrahim r. 1468–1495	Muhammad r. 1495–1496 r. 1496–1496	Aghlaq r. 1496–1505	Jumadaq r. 1426–1428	Giray r. 1465–1473	Jani-Beg I r. 1473–1480	Nur-Dawlat r. 1466–1469, 1475–1476 r. 1477–1478 r. 1486–1491	Haydar r. 1456–1456, 1475–1475	Mangli I r. 1469–1475, 1478–1515	Khalil r. 1465–1467	Ibrahim r. 1467–1479	Daniyal r. 1469–1486	Mahmud r. 1459–1465 r. 1465–1476	Ahmad r. 1459–1481	Bakhtiyar	Chuwaq
Muhammad-Shaybani r. 1500–1510	Mahmud-Shah	Abu Sa'id r. 1530–1533	Abdullah I r. 1540–1540	Abdul-Latif r. 1540–1550	Nawruz-Ahmad r. 1552–1556	Jani-Beg	Barakah	Abulaq	Aminaq	Kuluk r. 1505–1510	Murtada	Burunduq r. 1480–1511	Qasim I r. 1511–1521	Adik	Janish	Jadik	Usak	Satilghan r. 1491–1506	Janay r. 1506–1512	Muhammad I r. 1493–1495 r. 1515–1523	Sa'adat I r. 1524–1532	Sahib I r. 1521–1524 r. 1532–1551	Mubarak	Fath	Ilham-Ali r. 1479–1484, 1485–1487	Muhammad-Amin r. 1484–1485, 1487–1496 r. 1502–1519	Abdul-Latif r. 1487–1487, 1496–1502	Qasim I r. 1476–1480, 1482–1495	Abdul-Karim r. 1482–1485, 1488–1491 r. 1495–1504, 1509–1514	Jani-Beg I r. 1476–1477 r. 1514–1521	Murtada r. 1480–1482 r. 1482–1485, 1486–1491 r. 1493–1494	Hajji-Ahmad r. 1495–1502	Shaykh-Ahmad r. 1481–1491, 1491–1493 r. 1494–1502 r. 1527–1529	Sayyid-Ahmad III r. 1481–1485, 1486–1491 r. 1491–1502	Bahadur	Shaykh-Allahyar r. 1512–1516	Mangishlaq
Ubaydullah I r. 1533–1540	Pir-Muhammad I r. 1557–1561	Iskandar r. 1561–1583	Sulayman	Ilbars I r. 1511–1518	Balbars	Hasan-Quli r. 1519–1524	Sufyan r. 1524–1535	Buchugha r. 1535–1535	Awanish r. 1535–1538	Khal r. 1540–1547	Aghatay r. 1547–1557	Quchum r. 1563–1598	Mamash r. 1521–1523	Haqq-Nazar r. 1538–1580	Tahir I r. 1523–1533	Bauish r. 1528–1533	Buydash r. 1533–1538	Ahmad r. 1533–1535	Tughum r. 1533–1537	Shighay r. 1580–1582	Bulakay	Ghazi I r. 1523–1524	Islam I r. 1531–1531 r. 1532–1532	Bahadur r. 1523–1523	Dawlat I r. 1549–1551 r. 1551–1577	Safa r. 1524–1531, 1535–1546 r. 1546–1549	Abdur-Rahman r. 1533–1538, 1539–1545	Husayn r. 1521–1523, 1523–1527	Aq-Kebek r. 1532–1533, 1545–1546 r. 1546–1549	Birdi-Beg	Shaykh-Haydar	Qasim II r. 1504–1509, 1529–1531 r. 1531–1532	Beg-Pulad	Shah-Ali r. 1516–1519, 1535–1567 r. 1519–1521, 1546–1546 r. 1551–1552	Jan-Ali r. 1519–1531 r. 1531–1535	Yar-Muhammad
Abdul-Aziz I r. 1540–1550	Muhammad-Rahim	Abdullah II r. 1583–1598	Pir-Muhammad II r. 1599–1599	Sultan-Ghazi	Sultan-Hajji r. 1518–1519	Dust-Muhammad r. 1557–1558	Hajji-Muhammad r. 1558–1594, 1598–1602	Ali	Ishim	Andan	Tawakkul r. 1582–1598	Ishim I r. 1598–1628	Bahadur I r. 1652–1680	Aychuwaq	Muhammad II r. 1577–1584	Islam II r. 1584–1588	Ghazi II r. 1588–1596, 1596–1607	Fath I r. 1596–1596	Salamat I r. 1607–1610	Mubarak	Utamish r. 1549–1551	Abdullah	Yamghurchi r. 1546–1546, 1549–1549 r. 1551–1554	Darwish-Ali r. 1538–1539, 1549–1551 r. 1554–1556	Yadigar-Muhammad r. 1552–1552	Sayin-Pulad r. 1567–1573 r. 1575–1576	Jani-Muhammad r. 1599–1603
Burhan-Sultan r. 1552–1557	Abdul-Mu'min r. 1598–1599	Arab-Muhammad r. 1602–1621	Arslan-Ali r. 1614–1626	Ablai	Uraz-Muhammad r. 1600–1610	Kichik	Jani-Beg II r. 1628–1643	Jahangir r. 1643–1652	Sartaq	Irish	Sa'adat II r. 1584–1584	Tuqtamish r. 1607–1607	Inayat r. 1635–1637	Dawlat	Bahadur I r. 1637–1641	Islam III r. 1644–1654	Muhammad IV r. 1641–1644, 1654–1666	Karim	Mubarak	Safa	Adil	Jani-Beg II r. 1610–1623, 1628–1635	Mustafa-Ali r. 1585–1590	Din-Muhammad	Baqi-Muhammad r. 1603–1605	Wali-Muhammad r. 1605–1611
Jochi r. 1695–1697	Wali r. 1697–1698	Khabash r. 1621–1623	Ilbars II r. 1621–1623	Isfandiyar I r. 1623–1643	Abu'l-Ghazi I r. 1643–1664	Sayyid-Burhan r. 1626–1679	Kichik	Bukay	Tawka r. 1680–1715	Wali	Khusraw	Aytaq-Hajji	Muhammad III r. 1623–1628	Adil r. 1666–1671	Salim I r. 1671–1678, 1684–1691 r. 1692–1699, 1702–1704	Hajji II r. 1683–1684	Sa'adat III r. 1691–1691	Murad r. 1678–1683	Safa r. 1691–1692	Dawlat III r. 1715–1717	Imam-Quli r. 1611–1642	Nadir-Muhammad r. 1642–1645	Rustam-Muhammad
Shah-Niyaz r. 1698–1702	Musa r. 1703–1704	Anusha-Muhammad r. 1664–1686	Bushay	Khudabanda	Pulad r. 1718–1729	Sameke r. 1718–1734	Aytaq	Ablai	Qayip r. 1715–1718	Abu'l-Khayr r. 1718–1748	Tuqtamish	Dawlat II r. 1699–1702, 1709–1713	Sa'adat IV r. 1717–1724	Ghazi III r. 1704–1707	Qaplan I r. 1707–1709, 1713–1715 r. 1730–1736	Mangli II r. 1724–1730, 1737–1739	Salamat II r. 1739–1743	Rajab-Muhammad	Abdul-Aziz II r. 1645–1681	Subhan-Quli r. 1681–1702	Muhammad-Tahir r. 1740–1741
Shir-Ghazi r. 1714–1728	Shah-Bakht r. 1702–1703	Sayyid-Ali r. 1703–1703	Ilbars III r. 1728–1740	Shah-Timur r. 1721–1736	Khudaidad r. 1686–1689	Muhammad-Arang r. 1689–1695	Yadigar I r. 1704–1714	Irish-Muhammad	Tinakay	Tursun	Abu'l-Muhammad r. 1734–1771 r. 1741–1771	Sa'id	Ishim	Kart-Abu'l-Khayr r. 1718–1730	Yulbars r. 1730–1740	Wali	Bahadur II r. 1728–1728 r. 1748–1771	Nur-Ali I r. 1741–1742 r. 1748–1786	Ir-Ali r. 1791–1794	Yar-Muhammad r. 1786–1791	Aychuwaq r. 1797–1805	Adil	Mamay r. 1728–1728	Arslan r. 1748–1756, 1767–1767	Fath II r. 1736–1737	Ahmad	Karim r. 1758–1764, 1768–1769	Halim r. 1756–1758	Salim II r. 1743–1748	Maqsud r. 1767–1768	Ibrahim	Ubaydullah II r. 1702–1711	Abu'l-Fayd r. 1711–1747
Abu'l-Ghazi II r. 1742–1747	Saffar	Ubaydullah III r. 1751–1754	Abdullah I r. 1772–1772	Yadigar II r. 1772–1775, 1779–1781 r. 1783–1790	Kichik r. 1718–1748	Baraq r. 1748–1750	Abu'l-Fayd r. 1771–1774	Tawka r. 1764–1764	Qara-Bash	Khudabanda	Abu'l-Fath r. 1740–1750	Ablai r. 1756–1771 r. 1771–1781 r. 1771–1781	Qayip r. 1747–1757	Qara-Beg r. 1757–1758	Ishim II r. 1790–1791, 1796–1797	Bukay r. 1812–1815	Shighay r. 1815–1823	Qaratay r. 1806–1816	Bulakay r. 1770–1770	Jan-Tura I r. 1805–1809	Shir-Ghazi r. 1812–1824	Aqim r. 1770–1771, 1772–1772	Dawlat IV r. 1769–1770, 1775–1777	Shahbaz r. 1787–1789	Salim III r. 1764–1767, 1770–1771	Bahadur II r. 1782–1782 r. 1783–1787	Sahib II r. 1771–1775	Shahin r. 1777–1782, 1782–1783	Bakht r. 1789–1792	Qaplan II r. 1770–1770	Abu'l-Ghazi r. 1758–1785	Timur-Ghazi r. 1758–1764	Artuq-Ghazi r. 1771–1772	Abu'l-Mu'min r. 1747–1751	Shir-Ghazi r. 1754–1756
Shah-Ghazi r. 1764–1767	Pulad-Ghazi r. 1781–1783	Abu'l-Ghazi IV r. 1790–1802	Abu'l-Ghazi V r. 1802–1804, 1806–1806	Tahir II r. 1781–1784	Bukay r. 1815–1819	Nur-Ali II r. 1768–1769	Taghay r. 1809–1826	Juma-Jan r. 1817–1819	Wali r. 1781–1819	Qasim II r. 1806–1809	Adil r. 1774–1781	Abu'l-Ghazi III r. 1767–1768 r. 1791–1806	Jahangir r. 1769–1770	Abdul-Aziz r. 1771–1771	Abu'l-Fayd r. 1775–1779	Jahangir r. 1823–1845
Chinghiz r. 1819–1822	Ubaydullah r. 1819–1822	Kana-Shirin r. 1841–1847	Harun-Ghazi r. 1816–1821	Jan-Tura II r. 1817–1819	Sahib r. 1845–1847
