= Hajji Muhammad (Golden Horde) =

Khan of the Golden Horde from 1419 to 1423

Khan of the Golden Horde
- Reign: 1419–1423
- Predecessor: Qādir Berdi
- Successor: Barāq
- Died: 1428?
- Issue: Maḥmūd, Sayyid Aḥmad
- Dynasty: Borjigin
- Father: ʿAlī
- Religion: Sunni Islam

Hajji Muhammad (Turki/Kypchak and Persian: حاجی محمد) was Khan of the Golden Horde from 1419 to 1423. The evidence on his reign in this confused period of civil war is limited; moreover, his name invites confusion with several contemporaries in both the medieval sources and more modern treatments; the other Muḥammads include Ulugh Muḥammad, Muḥammad Barāq, Kūchuk Muḥammad son of Tokhtamysh, and Küchük Muḥammad son of Tīmūr. In retrospect, Ḥājjī Muḥammad is significant as a precursor and ancestor of the khans of Sibir.

== Ancestry ==
According to the Tawārīḫ-i guzīdah-i nuṣrat-nāmah and the Muʿizz al-ansāb, Ḥājjī Muḥammad was son of ʿAlī, the son of Bīk-Qundī, the son of Ming-Tīmūr, the son of Bādāqūl, the son of Jūjī-Būqā, the son of Bahādur, the son of Shiban, the son of Jochi, the son of Chinggis Khan. He was thus the nephew of Khan Ḥasan Beg (1368–1369), the great-nephew of the khans Khayr Pūlād (1362–1365) and Īl Beg (1373–1374), and the cousin of the khans Qāghān Beg (1375–1377) and ʿArab Shāh (1377–1380). According to the Muʿizz al-ansāb, Ḥājjī Muḥammad's mother was the sister of the Qongirat emir Manqlāy Muḥammad Khwāja.

== Reign ==
When his protégé Darwīsh Khan was defeated and killed by Qādir Berdi in 1419, the beglerbeg Edigu fled first to the Crimea, where he raised as his new protégé the Tuqa-Timurid Beg Ṣūfī. Having suffered a further defeat at the hands of Qādir Berdi, Edigu fled to the east and Sibir, where he proclaimed as khan the Shibanid Ḥājjī Muḥammad. Although he naturally had Ḥājjī Muḥammad's support, Edigu died of mortal wounds sustained in battle against the forces of Qādir Berdi later the same year. He is said to have sworn his sons to uphold Ḥājjī Muḥammad as khan. As Qādir Berdi himself perished in the struggle at this time, Edigu's sons, led by Manṣūr, quickly succeeded in making Ḥājjī Muḥammad the monarch of the majority of the territory of the Golden Horde.

Ḥājjī Muḥammad's success, however, was tenuous and short-lived, especially where the western part of the Golden Horde was concerned, as he was soon faced with opposition by several rivals for the throne and their supporters. The first assertions of the claims of Ulugh Muḥammad, supported by the Shīrīn emir Tekne, are dated variously to 1419 or 1421 or even 1424, and there is much confusion among scholars as to which khan is designated in the historical sources. More certain rivals of Ḥājjī Muḥammad included the Tuqa-Timurids Beg Ṣūfī and his apparent successor Khudāydād in the Crimea, Ghiyāth ad-Dīn II son of Shādī Beg at Tana, and Barāq son of Quyurchuq, supported by the Timurids in the East. Ḥājjī Muḥammad seems to have made headway against his rivals in the Crimea (if he is the Khan Muḥammad who issued a diploma there in April 1420), but he subsequently started to lose ground in the east, where Barāq advanced with the support of the Timurid Ulugh Beg in 1421. Ḥājjī Muḥammad soon lost the support of his beglerbeg Manṣūr, who deserted to his kinsman Barāq, tipping the scales in the latter's favor. In the confused struggle, Ḥājjī Muḥammad was killed against Barāq, perhaps as early as 1423; Manṣūr betrayed Barāq in turn, in favor of Ghiyāth ad-Dīn II and possibly Ulugh Muḥammad, later returned to Barāq, and was finally executed by him in 1427.

== Descendants ==
According to the Tawārīḫ-i guzīdah-i nuṣrat-nāmah, Ḥājjī Muḥammad had three sons, two of whom claimed the throne in Sibir and one of whom was the ancestor of the later khans of Sibir.

- Maḥmūd (Maḥmūdāq), Khan of Sibir 1431–1464, ancestor of the later khans of Sibir
- Sayyid Aḥmad (Sayyidāq), Khan of Sibir 1464–after 1468
- Shibā Ghāzī

== Genealogy ==
- Genghis Khan
- Jochi
- Shiban
- Bahadur
- Jochi Buqa
- Badaqul
- Ming Tīmūr
- Beg Qundī
- ʿAlī
- Ḥājjī Muḥammad

== Bibliography ==
- Gaev, A. G., "Genealogija i hronologija Džučidov," Numizmatičeskij sbornik 3 (2002) 9-55.
- Howorth, H. H., History of the Mongols from the 9th to the 19th Century. Part II.1. London, 1880.
- Počekaev, R. J., Cari ordynskie: Biografii hanov i pravitelej Zolotoj Ordy. Saint Petersburg, 2010.
- Reva, R., "Borba za vlast' v pervoj polovine XV v.," in Zolotaja Orda v mirovoj istorii, Kazan', 2016: 704–729.
- Sabitov, Ž. M., Genealogija "Tore", Astana, 2008.
- Seleznëv, J. V., Èlita Zolotoj Ordy: Naučno-spravočnoe izdanie, Kazan', 2009.
- Tizengauzen, V. G. (trans.), Sbornik materialov otnosjaščihsja k istorii Zolotoj Ordy. Izvlečenija iz persidskih sočinenii, republished as Istorija Kazahstana v persidskih istočnikah. 4. Almaty, 2006.
- Vohidov, Š. H. (trans.), Istorija Kazahstana v persidskih istočnikah. 3. Muʿizz al-ansāb. Almaty, 2006.

Hajji Muhammad (Golden Horde) Borjigin (1206–1635)
Regnal titles
Preceded by Qādir Berdi	Khan of the Golden Horde; 1419–1423	Succeeded by Barāq
