= Temur-Malik (White Horde) =

Khan of the White Horde from 1377 to 1378

Khan of the Golden Horde Eastern Half (White Horde)
- Reign: 1377–1378
- Predecessor: Toqtaqiya
- Successor: Tokhtamysh
- Dynasty: Borjigin
- Father: Urus Khan
- Religion: Islam

Temür Malik (Kypchak: تمور ملک), also spelled Timur-Malik (Turki and Persian: تیمور ملک), the son of Urus Khan, was the ninth Khan of the White Horde. Early during his reign, he successfully invaded the lands of his cousin Toqtamysh. However, Toqtamysh later managed to trap and kill Timur-Malik near Qara-Tal (on the shore of the Aral Sea), and succeeded him.

== Family ==
Timur Malik was a son of Urus Khan, and brother of Kutlug-Buga, Toqtaqiya and Quyurchuq.

Shadi Beg and Temür Qutlugh were erroneously identified as his children. In actuality these two were first cousins descended from Tuqa-Timur's other son named Kay-Timur. The confusion seems to have arisen from the similarity of names, given that the elements compounded with "Tīmūr" in the personal names of these individuals are all princely titles (khan, malik, beg).

== Genealogy ==
- Genghis Khan
- Jochi
- Tuqa-Timur
- Urung-Timur (Uz-Timur, Urungbash)
- Achiq
- Taqtaq
- Timur Khwaja
- Badiq
- Urus Khan
- Temur-Malik

== See also ==
- List of khans of the Golden Horde

Preceded by Toqtaqiya	Khan of White Horde; 1377–1378	Succeeded by Toqtamysh
