= Ulugh Muhammad =

Founder of the Khanate of Kazan

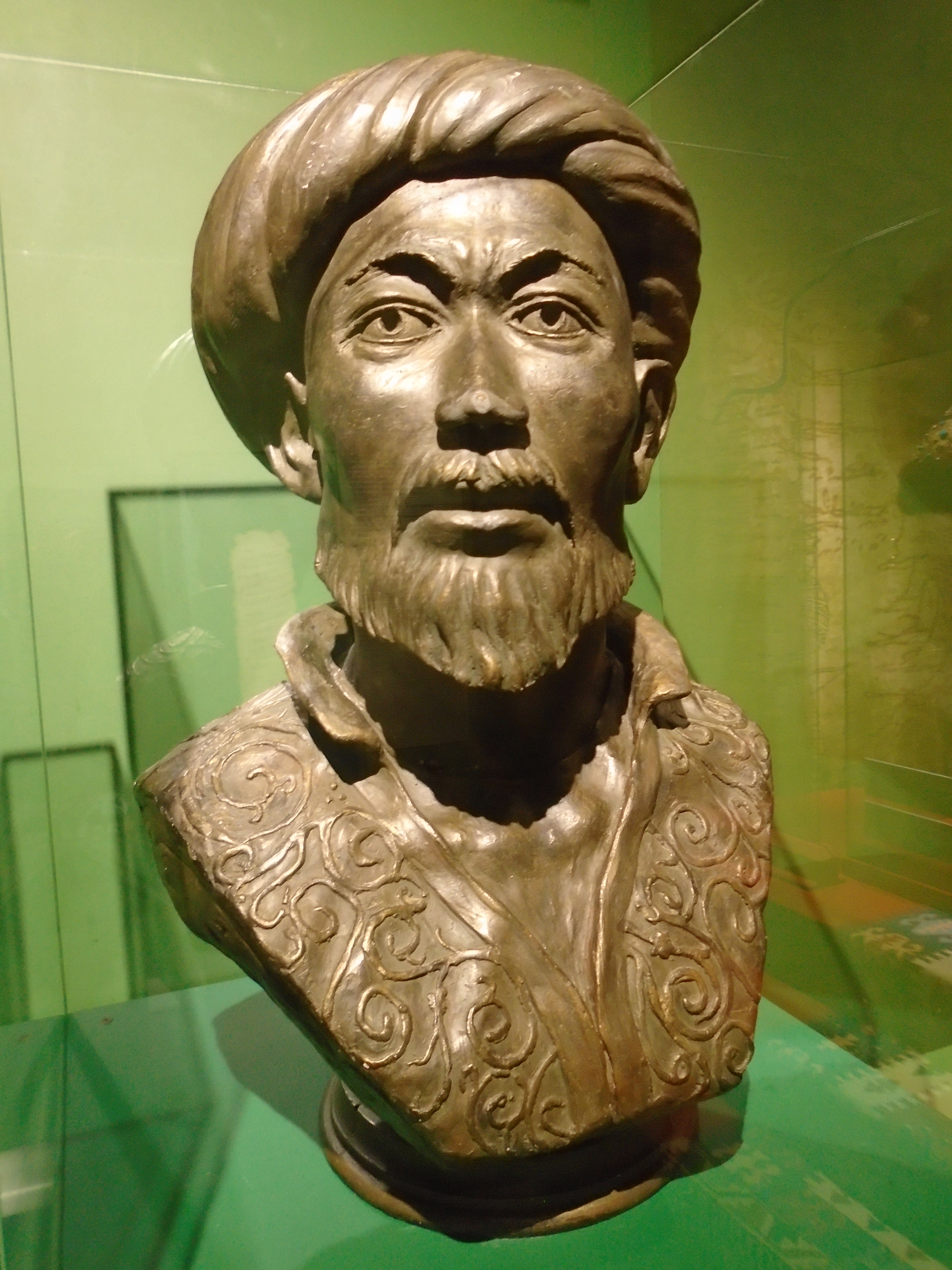
- Forensic reconstruction, 1996

Khan of the Golden Horde
- 1st reign: 1419–1423
- Predecessor: Hajji Muhammad Khan ibn Oghlan Ali
- Successor: Barak Khan
- 2nd reign: 1428–1437
- Predecessor: Barak Khan
- Successor: Sayid Ahmad I

Khan of Kazan
- Reign: 1438–1445
- Predecessor: Monarchy established
- Successor: Mäxmüd of Kazan
- Born: 1405
- Died: 1445 (aged 39–40); Kazan
- Dynasty: Borjigin
- Father: Ichkile Hassan
- Religion: Sunni Islam

Ulugh Muhammad or Muhammad Khan (1405–1445; Chagatai, Volga Türki, and Persian: الغ محمد; Kypchak/Cuman: محمد خان; written as Ulanus by orientalists) was a medieval Tatar statesman, Genghisid, Khan of the Golden Horde (before 1436), ruler of Crimea (1437), and the founder of the Khanate of Kazan, which he ruled from 1438–1445. He was the son of the oglan Ichkile Hassan and the cousin of Tokhtamysh. He received the nickname Ulugh, meaning 'older' or 'large', in contrast to Küchük Muhammad, meaning 'younger' or 'small'.

Ulugh Muhammad was Khan of the Golden Horde in 1419–1423, 1426, and 1428. In 1428–1432 he waged a stubborn struggle for possession of the Golden Horde (Ulug Ulus) with the representatives of a minor branch of the Tukaytimurids (one of the branches of the Gengisids). After being defeated, Ulugh Muhammad escaped to Volga Bulgaria vilayet in 1423. With the support of Vytautas, Ulugh Muhammad was able to regain the throne of the Golden Horde in 1426. He succeeded in spreading the power of the Horde to Crimea and established friendly relations with the Ottoman Sultan Murad II. Ulugh Muhammad sent an embassy to Egypt in 1428–1429. In 1431 the son and grandson of the ruler of Moscow, Dmitry Donskoy came to the court to Ulugh Muhammad in order to reach a decision about princely succession. Ulugh Muhammad ruled in favour of the grandson, Vasiliy II .

== Family ==
Ulugh Muhammad was most likely the son of Jalal ad-Din khan and the grandson of Tokhtamysh, although he may have been descended from Hassan Jefai, a relative of Tokhtamysh. Either way, he was a descendant of Jochi and therefore of Genghis Khan. Ulugh Muhammad's son Mustafa died fighting near Ryazan in 1444. His son Qasim Khan went to collect ransom after the battle of Suzdal, entered Russian service and in 1452 founded the Qasim Khanate. His son Mäxmüd of Kazan succeeded him.

== Golden Horde ==
Ulugh Muhammad first came to power following the death of Yeremferden. His main competitor for control of the Horde was his cousin Dawlat Berdi, the son of Yeremferden. For much of his reign Ulugh Muhammad controlled Sarai, and was therefore seen as the most legitimate ruler within the Horde, although Sarai was captured by his rival after the Siege of Sarai in 1420 and held by him for two years.

In 1422 Baraq Khan defeated both Ulugh Muhammad and Dawlat and drove them out of the country. While Dawlat remained in Crimea, Ulugh Muhammad fled to the Grand Duchy of Lithuania and pled for assistance from Vytautas the Great. With this assistance, he was able to march on Baraq and recapture Sarai.

After regaining control over the Khanate, Ulugh Muhammad marched on Crimea, where Dawlat Berdi had re-established himself following Baraq's defeat and death. After a series of indecisive skirmishes his invasion was cut short due to the death of Vytautas, which forced Ulugh Muhammad to concentrate his forces on Lithuania, where he supported Sigismund Kęstutaitis against Švitrigaila in the fight for the Lithuanian throne. Švitrigaila, in turn, supported Dawlat Berdi and later Sayid Ahmad I, as did Vasili II of Moscow.

== Kazan ==
Ulugh Muhammad lost control of the Golden Horde in 1436 and fled to Crimea. He quarreled with the Crimeans, led a 3000-man army north and took the border town of Belyov. In 1437 Vasili II of Moscow sent a large army against Ulugh Muhammad under the command of Dmitry Shemyaka, but they were defeated at the Battle of Belyov. Ulugh Muhammad subsequently moved to Volga and in 1438 captured Kazan, separating it from the Golden Horde. In 1439 he raided Muscovy, burning Kolomna and the outskirts of Moscow. Nothing is known of his life from 1439–1444, but in 1444–45 Ulugh Muhammad occupied Nizhny Novgorod and marched on Murom. Vasili II counterattacked in 1445 but was defeated and captured at the Battle of Suzdal, only to be ransomed. Ulugh Muhammad died a few months later, possibly murdered by his son Mäxmüd.

== Genealogy ==
- Genghis Khan
- Jochi
- Tuqa-Timur
- Urung-Timur
- Saricha
- Tulaq-Timur
- Tuqa-Timur
- Toq-Timur
- Ali-Bek Tula-Timur
- Hassan Toq-Timur
- Ulugh Muhammad (1437–1446)

== Children ==
- Mäxmüd of Kazan
- Yakub
- Yousuf
- Mostafa
- Qasim Khan

== See also ==
- List of khans of the Golden Horde
- List of Kazan khans

Ulugh Muhammad House of Borjigin (Боржигин) (1206–1635)
Regnal titles
Preceded by Yeremferden	Khan of the Golden Horde (with Dawlat Berdi); 1419–1421	Succeeded by Baraq
Preceded by Baraq	Khan of the Golden Horde (with Dawlat Berdi); 1427–1437	Succeeded by Sayid Ahmad I
Preceded by the Khanate established	Khan of the Kazan Khanate; 1437–1445	Succeeded by Mäxmüd
