= Toqtaqiya =

Khan of the White Horde in 1377

Khan of the Golden Horde Eastern Half (White Horde)
- Reign: 1377
- Predecessor: Urus Khan
- Successor: Temur-Malik
- Died: 1377
- Dynasty: Borjigin
- Religion: Tengrism

Toqtaqiya (Turki/Kypchak: توقتاقیا) was the son of Urus Khan and the Khan of the White Horde in 1377 for less than a year. In this time, he defeated his cousin Toqtamish and drove him from Sabran. He died shortly after this victory, just a few months after Urus.

== Genealogy ==
- Genghis Khan
- Jochi
- Tuqa-Timur
- Urung-Timur (Uz-Timur, Urungbash)
- Achiq
- Taqtaq
- Timur Khwaja
- Badiq
- Urus Khan
- Toqtaqiya

== See also ==
- List of khans of the Golden Horde

Preceded by Urus Khan	Khan of the White Horde; 1377–1377	Succeeded by Timur-Malik
