= Barak Khan =

Khan of the Golden Horde from 1423 to 1429

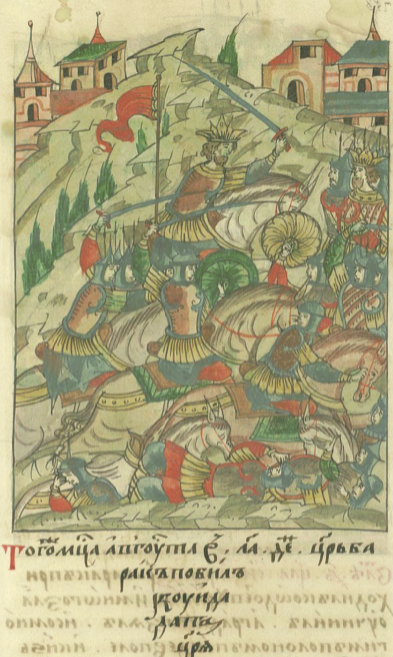
- Barak in battle, miniature from the Illustrated Chronicle of Ivan the Terrible (16th century)

Khan of the Golden Horde
- Reign: 1423–1429
- Predecessor: Ulugh Muhammad and Dawlat Berdi
- Successor: Ulugh Muhammad
- Died: 1429; Golden Horde
- Dynasty: Borjigin
- Father: Quyurchuq
- Religion: Sunni Islam

Barak (Turki/Kypchak and Persian: براق خان; died 1429) was Khan of the Golden Horde from 1423 to 1429. His father was Quyurchuq, the son of Urus Khan, who was a descendant of Tuqa-Timur, the son of Jochi, the eldest son of Genghis Khan.

Barak took support from Ulugh Beg, the Timurid emir, and in 1422 he dethroned Kepek, Ulugh Muhammad as well as Dawlat Berdi, khans of the Golden Horde. And Barak Khan reoccupied Sighnak from the Timurids. However, he was defeated in 1427 by Ulugh Muhammad and was promptly assassinated by Jochi's descendant, Mohammed, who claimed the steppe between the Ural and Syr Darya rivers for his dynasty.

In the 1460s, Barak’s son Janibek rebelled against Abu'l-Khayr Khan and he, along with Kerei, immigrated to the environs of Jeti Su (Seven Rivers) and established the Kazakh Khanate.

== Genealogy ==
- Genghis Khan
- Jochi
- Tuqa-Timur
- Urung-Timur (Uz-Timur, Urungbash)
- Achiq
- Taqtaq
- Timur Khwaja
- Badiq
- Urus (?-1377)
- Quyurchuq
- Barak Khan (?-1429)
- Janibek Khan (1428-1480)
- Qasim Khan (1445-1521)
- Muhammed Khan (1521-1523)
- Tahir Ali Khan
- Haqqnazar Haider Khan (1537-1580)

== See also ==
- List of khans of the Golden Horde

== Bibliography ==
- Bosworth, C. E., The New Islamic Dynasties, New York, 1996.
- Gaev, A. G., "Genealogija i hronologija Džučidov," Numizmatičeskij sbornik 3 (2002) 9-55.
- Howorth, H. H., History of the Mongols from the 9th to the 19th Century. Part II.1. London, 1880.
- Judin, V. P., Utemiš-hadži, Čingiz-name, Alma-Ata, 1992.
- May, T., The Mongol Empire, Edinburgh, 2018.
- Počekaev, R. J., Cari ordynskie: Biografii hanov i pravitelej Zolotoj Ordy. Saint Petersburg, 2010a.
- Sabitov, Ž. M., Genealogija "Tore", Astana, 2008.
- Sagdeeva, R. Z., Serebrjannye monety hanov Zolotoj Ordy, Moscow, 2005.
- Tizengauzen, V. G. (trans.), Sbornik materialov otnosjaščihsja k istorii Zolotoj Ordy. Izvlečenija iz persidskih sočinenii, republished as Istorija Kazahstana v persidskih istočnikah. 4. Almaty, 2006.
- Vohidov, Š. H. (trans.), Istorija Kazahstana v persidskih istočnikah. 3. Muʿizz al-ansāb. Almaty, 2006.

Barak Khan House of Borjigin (Боржигин) (1206–1635)
Regnal titles
Preceded by Ulugh Muhammad and Dawlat Berdi	Khan of the Golden Horde; 1422–1427	Succeeded by Ulugh Muhammad
Preceded by Hajji Muhammad	Khan of the Blue Horde; 1421–1427	Succeeded by Mohammed and Mustafa
