= Ilbasan =

Khan of the White Horde from 1320/1321 to 1344/1345

Khan of the Golden Horde Eastern Half (White Horde)
- Reign: 1320/1321 – 1344/1345
- Predecessor: Sasibuqa
- Successor: Mubarak Khwaja
- Died: 1344/1345
- Dynasty: Borjigin
- Religion: Islam

Ilbasan or Erzen (Turki/Kypchak: ایرزن) was Khan of the White Horde from 1320/1321 to 1344/1345.

== Reign ==
During his reign, an increase in the cities, trade, and craft occurred in the Horde. After determining the boundaries of his Horde, Ilbasan appointed his deputies. Islam was used as an instrument to strengthen authority.

He died in 1344/1345.

== Genealogy ==
- Genghis Khan
- Jochi
- Orda Khan
- Sartaqtay
- Köchü
- Bayan
- Sasibuqa
- Ilbasan

== See also ==
- List of khans of the Golden Horde

Ilbasan House of Borjigin (1206–1635)
Regnal titles
Preceded by Sasibuqa	Khan of the White Horde; 1320/1321 – 1344/1345	Succeeded by Mubarak Khwaja
