= Kerei Khan =

Khan of the Kazakh Khanate from c. 1465 to 1473

Kerei کرای خان
- Khan
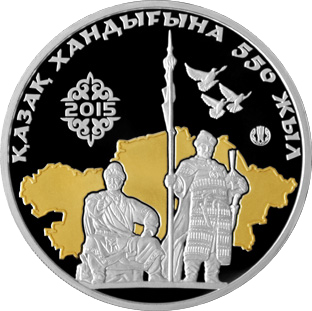
- Monument to Kerei Khan (on the left) on a commemorative coin of Kazakhstan

Khan of the Kazakh Khanate
- Reign: c. 1465 – 1473/4
- Coronation: c. 1465
- Predecessor: Khanate established
- Successor: Janibek Khan
- Born: 1424; White Horde
- Died: 1473/4 (aged 49‒50); Kazakh Khanate
- Issue: Burunduk Khan; Khoja Muhammad Sultan; Ali Sultan
Names
- Kerei bin Bolat Sultan
- House: House of Borjigin
- Dynasty: Töre; House of Urus Khan
- Father: Bolat Sultan
- Religion: Sunni Islam (Hanafi)

Kerei Khan (Kazakh: کرای خان, Керей хан, Kerei han; 1424, White Horde – 1473/1474, Kazakh Khanate) was a co-founder and the first Khan of the Kazakh Khanate from c. 1465 to 1473.

== History ==
There are currently two versions of how the first dynasty of the Kazakh khans originated. According to one of them they were from the House of Orda Ichen. On the other version, they were descendants of the thirteenth son of Jochi - Tuqa-Timur.

In the late 1450s, part of the nomadic population, headed by Janibek and Kerei, separated themselves from the rule of Uzbek Khan Abu'l-Khayr. They migrated to Moghulistan and settled in the valleys of the Chu and Talas rivers. Khan of Moghulistan united with them, offering them support against their opponents. Around 200,000 nomads joined Janibek Khan and Kerei Khan's movement, which had had a huge power and influence that it sparked fear in Abu'l-Khayr. As a response he undertook a military campaign in Moghulistan in 1468, but died suddenly on his way. After the death of Abu'l-Khayr, his son Sheikh Haidar succeeded him. All the opponents of Abu'l-Khayr teamed up and began an active struggle against him. The reign of Sheikh Haidar Khan was short-lived and he was eventually murdered by the Siberian Khan Ibak. Kerei received supreme power in eastern Dasht, who appointed his brother Janibek as the ruler of the west wing. Despite Kerei Khan and Janibek Khan possessing a significant military force, they fought against Shaybanids for power over the eastern steppe. Kerei Khan and his followers fought for the creation of an independent state which developed in political, cultural and economic terms. In the course of this conflict, Kerei Khan was killed. His name in the sources was last time mentioned in the events of winter 1473. The secession led by Kerei and Janibek was an important link in the chain of events that led to the formation of the Kazakh Khanate and the creation of the Kazakh nationality itself.

== Legacy ==
Since the end of the 15th century the term "Kazakh" acquired a political character, which was being used to designate individual feudal estates that were created by Kerei and Janibek, and from the beginning of the 16th century, after part of the tribes moved from the modern territory of Kazakhstan headed by Shaibani Khan in Maverannahr, the term began to acquire an ethnic character. It is unknown to what made Kerei and Janybek separate, and which location did the Kazakh Khanate originate. A number of authors wrote that the Khanate was formed at the turn of the 15th-16th centuries and that the migration of Kerei and Janibek was only the start of the formation of the Kazakh Khanate.

=== Memorial ===
On June 1, 2010, in Astana near the Museum of the First President of Kazakhstan, with the participation of Nursultan Nazarbayev, a monument to Kerei and Janibek was opened by the sculptor Renat Abenov.

| Preceded by None | Khan of the Kazakhs (with Janibek Khan) c. 1465 – 1473/4 | Succeeded by Janibek Khan |
