= Kutlug-Buga =

Kutlug-Buga was the son and heir of Urus Khan, who was the ruler of the Blue Horde, an eastern part of the Golden Horde and for some time he held the supreme power of the Khan of the Golden Horde. When his father left for the capital of the Golden Horde - Sarai-Berke, Kutlug-Buga served as the ruler of the Blue Horde.

In 1376, the leadership of Urus-Khan was opposed by Tokhtamysh, who at that time enjoyed the support of Timur. He probably hoped to establish control over the Blue Horde through his protege, and possibly over the entire Golden Horde. Tokhtamysh with the troops given by Timur invaded the Blue Horde. Kutlug-Buga commanded the army sent against Tokhtamysh, in the battle Kutlug-Buga was killed by an arrow, however his troops defeated Tokhtamysh, who fled to Timur.

== Genealogy ==
- Genghis Khan
- Jochi
- Tuqa-Timur
- Urung-Timur (Uz-Timur, Urungbash)
- Achiq
- Taqtaq
- Timur Khwaja
- Badiq
- Urus Khan
- Kutlug-Buga
