= Quyurchuq =

Khan of the Golden Horde from 1395 to 1397

Khan of the Golden Horde
- Reign: 1395–1397
- Predecessor: Tokhtamysh
- Successor: Tīmūr Qutluq
- Died: 1397
- Issue: Barāq Khan
- Dynasty: Borjigin
- Father: Urus Khan

Quyurchuq (Note: The name is found in various renditions, including Quyruchuq, Qarujaq, Qoyrichaq, Qoyrijak, Koirijak.) (Turki/Kypchak: قویورچق; died 1397) was Khan of the Golden Horde from 1395 to 1397. He was appointed by Timur (Tamerlane). Information on his life and reign is very limited.

== Ancestry ==
According to the Muʿizz al-ansāb and Tawārīḫ-i guzīdah-i nuṣrat-nāmah, Quyurchuq was a son of Urus Khan, a descendant of Tuqa-Timur, the son of Jochi, the son of Chinggis Khan. They give the ancestry as Qūyūrčuq, son of Urus Khān, the son of Bādāq, the son of Tīmūr-Khwāja, the son of Tāqtaq, the son of Achiq, the son of Ūrungbāsh (Ūrūng-Tīmūr), the son of Tūqā-Tīmūr, the son of Jūjī.

== Career ==
A younger son of Urus Khan, Quyurchuq survived his family's loss of the throne of the left (east) wing of the Golden Horde, the former Ulus of Orda, in 1379. In unclear circumstances he made his way to the court of Timur (Tamerlane), and became one of his captains. Quyurchuq accompanied Timur's second expedition into the Golden Horde, in 1395–1396, and participated in the Battle on the Terek in April 1395. Following the battle, Timur gave Quyurchuq a force of "Uzbek braves," set out for him the regalia of a khan, gave him a gold-embroidered caftan and gold belt, and ordered him to cross the Volga and take over the Golden Horde.

Quyurchuq did as instructed, and was successfully installed as khan at the traditional capital, Sarai. However, it would be a short and unhappy reign. The core territory of the Golden Horde had been plundered and ravaged by Timur, and the main cities, Sarai included, had been pillaged and razed. Timur headed home in the spring of 1396, leaving Quyurchuq in a difficult position at Sarai. The defeated khan Tokhtamysh was still at large in the north and west, while two relics of Timur's previous invasion of the Golden Horde, the rival khan Tīmūr Qutluq and his uncle Edigu controlled the territory to the east. While Tokhtamysh set out to reassert his authority over the southwestern portions of the Golden Horde, Tīmūr Qutluq and Edigu attacked and defeated Quyurchuq, seizing Sarai. This is generally dated to 1397, although it could have happened as early as 1396, immediately after Timur's departure. According to Tatar folklore, Quyurchuq was killed by Edigu himself.

== Descendants ==
According to the Muʿizz al-ansāb, Quyurchuq had a son and two daughters, three grandsons and a granddaughter, as follows.

- Barāq, khan in the east 1421–1426; of the Golden Horde 1423–1428
  - Mīr Sayyid
  - Mīr Qāsim
  - Abū-Saʿīd, called Jānī Beg, khan of the Kazakhs 1470–after 1490, ancestor of the later khans of the Kazakhs
  - Saʿādat-Bīka
- Ruqayya
- Pāyanda-Sulṭān

== Genealogy ==
- Genghis Khan
- Jochi
- Tuqa-Timur
- Urung-Timur (Uz-Timur, Urungbash)
- Achiq
- Taqtaq
- Timur Khwaja
- Badiq
- Urus Khan
- Quyurchuq

== See also ==
- List of khans of the Golden Horde

== Bibliography ==
- Gaev, A. G., "Genealogija i hronologija Džučidov," Numizmatičeskij sbornik 3 (2002) 9-55.
- Howorth, H. H., History of the Mongols from the 9th to the 19th Century. Part II.1. London, 1880.
- Počekaev, R. J., Cari ordynskie: Biografii hanov i pravitelej Zolotoj Ordy. Saint Petersburg, 2010.
- Sabitov, Ž. M., Genealogija "Tore", Astana, 2008.
- Sagdeeva, R. Z., Serebrjannye monety hanov Zolotoj Ordy, Moscow, 2005.
- Seleznëv, J. V., Èlita Zolotoj Ordy: Naučno-spravočnoe izdanie, Kazan', 2009.
- Tizengauzen, V. G. (trans.), Sbornik materialov otnosjaščihsja k istorii Zolotoj Ordy. Izvlečenija iz persidskih sočinenii, republished as Istorija Kazahstana v persidskih istočnikah. 4. Almaty, 2006.
- Vohidov, Š. H. (trans.), Istorija Kazahstana v persidskih istočnikah. 3. Muʿizz al-ansāb. Almaty, 2006.

| Preceded by Tokhtamysh | Khan of the Golden Horde; 1395–1397 | Succeeded by Tīmūr Qutluq |
