= Sasibuqa =

Khan of the White Horde from 1309 to 1320

Khan of the Golden Horde Eastern Half (White Horde)
- Reign: 1309–1320/1321
- Predecessor: Bayan？
- Successor: Ilbasan？
- Died: 1320/1321
- Dynasty: Borjigin
- Religion: Tengrism

Sasibuqa (Mongolian: Сатибуха; Kazakh: Сасыбұқа, romanized: Sasybūqa) was Khan of the White Horde. He may have been one of Bayan's four sons.

The rulers of the White Horde, or the left (easternmost) wing of the Golden Horde, issued decrees with the name of Khan in Sarai, though, they were reigning largely independent.

His son was Muslim Ilbasan, also known as Irzan, another khan of the White Horde.

== Genealogy ==
- Genghis Khan
- Jochi
- Orda Khan
- Sartaqtay
- Köchü
- Bayan
- Sasibuqa

== See also ==
- List of khans of the Golden Horde

Sasibuqa House of Borjigin (1206-1635)
Regnal titles
Preceded by Bayan	Khan of the White Horde; 1309-1320/1321	Succeeded by Ilbasan
