= White Horde =

13th-15th century Mongol horde

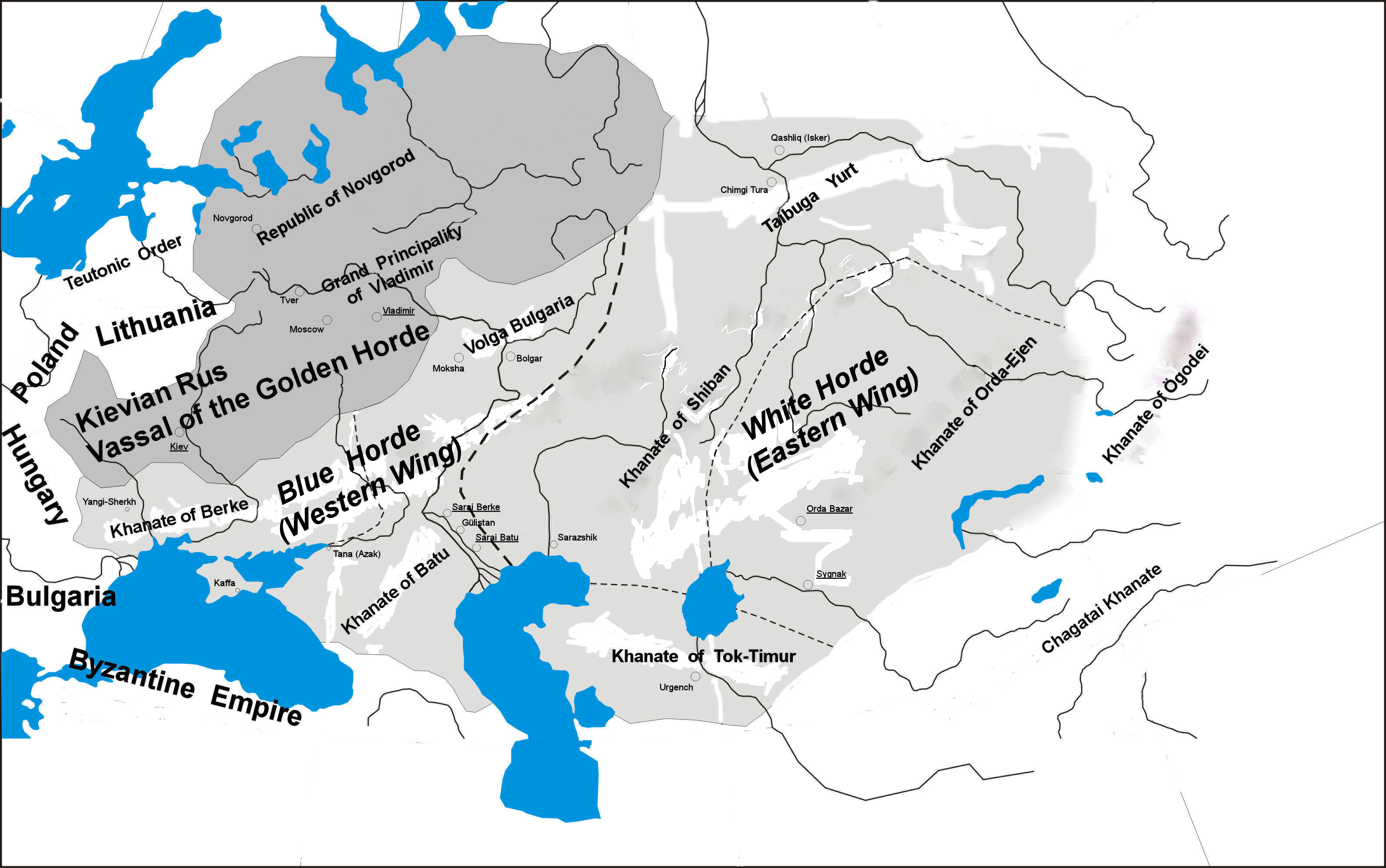
Map of the Golden Horde with its constituent parts, including the Blue Horde (west), the White Horde (east) and Russian vassals.

The White Horde (Chagatai: آق اۉردە; Kazakh: Ақ Орда, romanized: Aq Orda), or more appropriately, the left wing of the Jochid ulus, was one of the uluses within the Mongol Empire formed around 1225, after the death of Jochi when his son, Orda, inherited his father's appanage by the Jaxartes. It was the eastern constituent part of the Golden Horde (Jochid ulus) alongside the Blue Horde to the west.

== History ==
Because Orda and his descendants ruled the left division of the Golden Horde, they were called Princes of the left wing or of the left hand. Initially it covered the western part of the territory ruled by the Jochids and included western Central Asia and south-western Siberia. The capital of the White Horde was originally at Lake Balkhash, but later moved to Sygnaq, Kazakhstan on the Syr-Darya River.

When Batu Khan sent a large Jochid delegation to Hulegu's campaign in the Middle East, it included a strong contingent under Kuli, a son of Orda. However, suspicious deaths of the latter and other Jochid princes (c.1259) angered the rulers of the Golden Horde. During the succession war between Kublai and Arik Boke from 1260 to 1264, the White Horde elites supported the latter. They also began to support the Ogedeid prince Kaidu because he was supported by the khans such as Berke and Mongke-Temur.

Since 1280, Orda's successor, Konchi or Köchü, had allied with the Yuan Dynasty and the Ilkhanate, in return, they rewarded him. According to Rashid-al-Din Hamadani's account or H.H.Howorth's analyze, Kunchi possessed the territory of Ghazna and Bamiyan under the suzerainty of either the Chagatayid Khans or the Ilkhan. Kunchi warned the Ilkhan Abagha of the upcoming invasion of Baraq (Chagatai Khan) in 1268. However, when the Borjigin princes, who operated on the Qaghan Kublai's behalf in Central Asia and later rebelled, fought against each other, they appealed to Kunchi whose response is not clear.

Marco Polo describes the Horde as extremely cold area, saying:

This king (Köchü) has neither city nor castle; he and his people live always either in the wide plains or among great mountains and valleys. They subsist on the milk and flesh of their cattle, and have no grain. The king has a vast number of people, but he carries on no war with anybody, and his people live in great tranquility. They have enormous numbers of cattle, camels, horses, oxen, sheep, and so forth.

In 1299, the White Horde Khan, Bayan, was deposed by his cousin, Kobelek, who took assistance from Kaidu and Duwa. By 1304, Bayan had reoccupied most of his ancestors' lands. His horde began to herd around Syr-Darya, replacing the Shaybanids. Bayan's troops included the Russian and Magyar soldiers.

Their khan, Chimtay, sent his brothers to take the Golden Horde throne during the Blue Horde's period of anarchy, (1359-1380). But they were all murdered before reaching any success. Members from White Horde (sometimes it is confused with the Blue Horde), Khizr, and his son or relative, Arab Shaykh, briefly took the throne of the Golden Horde, using their army.

In 1375, Urus Khan, the eighth khan of the White Horde, became a contested khan of both the Blue Horde and the White Horde. He extruded the members from the House of Khizr. Urus died in 1377, and when his nephew Toqtamish wrested control of the White Horde from Urus's son Timur-Malik in 1378, he regained control of the Blue Horde as well. Thus, Toqtamish consolidated the two hordes, becoming the Khan of the Golden Horde.

After the defeat of Toqtamish in 1395–1396, Kuruichik was appointed head of the White Horde by Tamerlane. Since then, families of Jochi's sons, Tuqa-Timur, Shiban and Orda, began to merge with each other, establishing the Uzbeg and Kazakh hordes. Among them, Kuruichik's descendant, Borog, briefly asserted the throne of the Golden Horde in 1421.

After Baraq's murder, the Horde divided into two parts with two khans: Mohammed and Mustafa. Mustafa reconquered the Horde; however, in Siberia, another threat emerged – Abu'l-Khayr Khan. In 1446, the latter gained the victory over Mustafa, ending the existence of Orda's ulus (the left wing of the Golden Horde).

== See also ==
- Blue Horde
- Golden Horde
- Orda Khan
- Mongol invasion of Europe
- Wings of the Golden Horde
- List of khans of the Golden Horde
