= Sighnaq =

Capital of the Blue Horde and Kazakh Khanate

Coordinates: 44°09′30″N 66°57′30″E

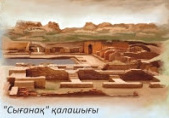
Sighnaq on a 2019 postage stamp of Kazakhstan

Sighnaq (Turki/Kypchak: سغناق; Kazakh: Сығанақ, romanized: Syğanaq) was an ancient city in Central Asia, in what is now Kyzylorda Region of Kazakhstan. It was the capital of the Blue Horde, although the city is almost unknown. The region in which Sighnaq was situated was called Farab. It was located between the settlements of Isfijab and Jand. The name means 'Shelter', a name that is found also in other regions, especially in Transcaucasia.

According to Hayton of Corycus, Sighnaq was located in the Karatau Mountains, from where the river Kara Ichuk, a tributary of Syr Darya, emanates. Klaproth says that the city was located on the banks of Mutkan, a right hand side tributary of Syr Darya, that emanates from the Karatau mountains, but he does not mention his source. Sherif al-Din speaks of Sabran and Sighnaq as two border cities of Turkestan and says that Sighnaq was located 40 km from Otrar; the biographical book called Tabakatol hanefiyet, by Ketevi, placed it near the town of Yassy (i.e. the modern city of Turkistan). The 19th-century Hungarian turkologist and traveller Vámbéry says, without mentioning the source, that Jand was connected to a channel. It seems to have been one of the main Turkish settlements of the region east of the Caspian Sea together with Yengikent, Sawran or Sabran and others. Mahmud Kashghari expressly stated it was a town of the Oghuz, al-Muqaddasi also associates it with Otrar and says that it was "24 farsakhs further up the Syr Darya". On the basis of all of this information, the most reasonable localization appears to be the area around Babai Kurgan, and finally, Sunak Kurgan, a few kilometers northeast of Tyumen Arik along the Orenburg-Tashkent railway, was identified as the ruins of Sighnaq.

== History ==
It is believed that in the 10th century there was a semi-sedentary city of the Oghuz Turks near the border, where they exchanged their products with those of Muslim states to the south. The Hudud al-'Alam indicates that bows were manufactured for export. The region was known as Dar al-Kufr. In the twelfth century it was the capital of the khanate of Kipchak (still pagan), and was exposed to raids of the 'ghazis'. At least two incursions (ghazawat) are known, one in 1152 and one in 1195, from Khwarezm, the second one occurred while Kayir Toku Khan ruled Sighnaq. However, at the beginning of the thirteenth century Ala al-Din Muhammad conquered the land and annexed it to his empire; a few years later, his rule was replaced with that of Genghis Khan, who conquered the region after a siege in 1220. The population was massacred.

Annexed by Timur in the late fourteenth century, in 1427, Baraq Khan, khan of the Blue Horde and also of the Golden Horde, claimed Sighnaq from Shah Rukh, the son of Tamerlane, who refused; Baraq defeated the Timurids and occupied the city; the Timurids recovered it after his death (c. 1428), but Abu'l-Khayr, founder of the Uzbek Khanate, conquered it in turn in 1446. In 1457, the battle of Kuk Kashanah, or Kök Kašane, took place 7 km to the south, in which the Kalmyks defeated the Uzbeks and Abu'l-Khayr had to accept whatever peace Uz Timur the Kalmyk would offer. Muhammad Shaybani, refounder of the Uzbek Khanate, was born in the region of Sighnaq. In the sixteenth century, it belonged to the Kazakhs, but it lost importance and eventually disappeared.

== Sources ==
- Favereau, Marie (20 April 2021). The Horde: How the Mongols Changed the World. Harvard University Press. ISBN 978-0-674-24421-4.
- Howorth, Henry Hoyle: History of the Mongols, from the 9th to the 19th Century. Part II, division I. The so-called tartars of Russia and Central Asia. London: Longmans, Green and Co, 1880.
