= Bayan (khan) =

Khan of the White Horde from 1302 to 1309

Khan of the Golden Horde Eastern Half (White Horde)
- Reign: 1302–1309
- Predecessor: Köchü
- Successor: Sasibuqa
- Died: 1309
- Dynasty: Borjigin
- Religion: Tengrism

Bayan (or Buyan; Naiyan; r. 1302–1309) was one of the most famous khans of White Horde. "Bayan" means "rich" and "buyan" means "good deed/act" (as in religion or belief) in the Mongolian language.

When Bayan became the khan, his cousin and relatives revolted against him. The latter, under his cousin Kobluk, were supported by Khaidu and Duwa. Bayan fought his rebel cousin, Koblek, and Kaidu's forces several times. He asked help from Tokhta, ruler of the Golden Horde and the Blue Horde. Tokhta was angry with the situation, and warned Khaidu not to help the rebels.

Buyan also tried to ally with Temür Khan of the Yuan dynasty, the suzerain of Mongol Empire, against the Chagatai Khanate and Khaidu. But the distance between them made it ineffective. Finally, Bayan defeated his enemies and ruled his Horde till 1309. It is claimed that Circassians, Russians and Hungarians (probably Bashkirs) served in his army.

Howorth, writing in 1880 thinks that Kobluk was based in Gazni and Bamiyan. He says that Berke loaned Hulagu some troops and that when these two broke some of them went east and founded a new principality in what is now Afghanistan and claimed to be subjects of the distant Golden Horde.

== Genealogy ==
- Genghis Khan
- Jochi
- Orda Khan
- Sartaqtay
- Köchü
- Bayan

== See also ==
- List of khans of the Golden Horde

Bayan (khan) House of Borjigin (1206–1634)
Regnal titles
Preceded by Köchü	Khan of the White Horde; 1302–1309	Succeeded by Sasibuqa
