= Köchü =

Khan of the White Horde from 1280 to 1302

Khan of the Golden Horde Eastern Half (White Horde)
- Reign: 1280–1302
- Predecessor: Qun Quran
- Successor: Bayan
- Died: 1302
- Dynasty: Borjigin
- Religion: Islam

Khüchü (Note: Turki/Kypchak: قونیچی) (or Köchü, Konchi, Konichi) was Khan of the White Horde from c. 1280 to 1302. He was the eldest son of Sartaqtai (son of Orda Khan) and Qujiyan of the Qongirat.

Marco Polo says Köchü had a vast number of people, but he carried on no war with anybody, and his people lived in great tranquility. Since 1280 he sent friendly letter to Kublai Khan, and the Yuan dynasty rewarded him a large amount of grains and other valuable things of China in turn for his alliance. According to Rashid-al-Din Hamadani, he also kept a very friendly relationship with his relatives, the Ilkhanate, in Persia. According to historian Rashid al-Din Hamadani, Köchü allied with Kaidu.

Köchü possessed the territory of Ghazna and Bamiyan under the suzerainty of either the Chagatayid Khans or the Ilkhan. However, he proved his alliance and refused when Baraq, ruler of Chagatai Khanate, demanded him to give up the authority of those areas before his attack on Iran in 1269.

He was an influential khan. When the Borjigin princes, who operated on Kublai's behalf in Central Asia and later on rebelled, fought against each other, they appealed to Köchü. He died c. 1302 because he was overweight.

== Genealogy ==
- Genghis Khan
- Jochi
- Orda Khan
- Sartaqtay
- Köchü

== See also ==
- List of khans of the Golden Horde

== Notes ==
Köchü House of Borjigin (1206-1635)
Regnal titles
Preceded by Qun Quran	Khan of the White Horde; 1280–1302	Succeeded by Bayan
