= Battle of Orbulaq =

Battle in the Kazakh-Dzungar Wars

- Part of the Kazakh–Dzungar War (1643–1647) of Kazakh–Dzungar Wars
Date	1643
Location	Orbulaq River gorge, Dzungarian Alatau, Kazakhstan
Result	Kazakh victory

Belligerents
Kazakh Khanate; Supported By: Khanate of Bukhara	Dzungar Khanate

Commanders and leaders
(Kazakh Khanate) Salqam Jangir Khan; Supported By: (Khanate of Bukhara) Yalangtoʻsh Bakhodir	(Dzungar Khanate) Erdeni Batur

Strength
20,600	35,000–50,000

Casualties and losses
Unknown	(Dzungar Khanate) 11,000 casualties

The Battle of Orbulaq was fought in 1643 between Jangir Khan of the Kazakh Khanate with the support of the Emir of Samarkand, Yalangto'sh Bakhodir of Khanate of Bukhara against the khong tayiji Erdeni Batur of Dzungar Khanate, resulting in the defeat of the Dzungar army.

== Background ==
The conflict started shortly after the creation of the Dzungar Khanate in 1635, and with Erdeni seeing an opportunity against the Kazakhs. He launched a major invasion and battled Jangir Khan, later taking him as prisoner. Then he was released and in 1640, Erdeni batur launched another campaign against the Kazakhs by Erdeni batur himself taking two lands of the Altai Kyrgyz and 40 thousand Tokmaks. Afterwards he continued ravaging several of the towns situated between Turkestan and Tashkent, killing many and taking large numbers of prisoners. The total number of the dead and captured was estimated at 30,000. With this, Jangir asked Yalangto'sh Bakhodir for assistance against the Dzungars, with them having established friendly relations before. With this alliance, they fought the Dzungar army at Orbulaq river.

== Course of the battle ==
Jangir chose a mountainous place near the Orbulaq river in the southwestern foot slopes of the Dzungarian Alatau as a place of the battle, resulting in the combat being named after it.

The Kazakhs started entrenching having been outnumbered by 1:25. According to A. I. Levshin, "Jangir built fortifications of length of 2.5–3km, the front edge of the trench was as tall as a man. Half of the warriors organized field fortifications along the road, and the rest dispersed on the cliffs, thereby preparing an ambush for the Dzungars. In these fortifications, Jahangir sultan patiently waited in the ambush, planning merely to drive off rather than destroy Erdeni-Batur led Dzungar army."

This was the first time the Kazakh army had come prepared primarily with firearms rather than with swords or bow-and-arrow equipment. Many of the firearms the Kazakhs used were imported from Persia and were very modern for their time. This modern weaponry became a significant reason as to why the Kazakhs held off the Dzungars despite being heavily outnumbered.

The battle began with an ambush of the Kazakhs, the Dzungars immediately initiated attacks on entrenchment. Standing downhill in an open ground, the troops started to suffer heavy losses within a matter of minutes. In this battle, the Kazakhs used firearms en-masse for the first time, and the Dzungars lost from eleven thousand men.

Around this time, the 20,000 reinforcement troops of the Emirate of Bukhara arrived to the aid of the Kazakhs. Yalangto'sh Bakhodir led Bukharan forces, despite significant distance to cover, managed to march right into the battle, entering the valley and hitting the rear of the Dzungars. The Dzungars, not expecting such a turn of events, went in dismay. Erdeni Batur decided not to engage further on until us in the battle of Orbulaq.

== Aftermath ==
Later, Erdeni batur continued his campaigns in 1646, counterattacking Jangir's liberation forces and capturing Sairam and Turkistan; forcing subjugation to the Kazakhs. Later Jangir asked Bukharan assistance once more with Abd al-Aziz arrived in the area with an army, They repelled the Dzungar army, leaving Erdeni disappointed by Abd al-Aziz's claims.
