= Timeline of the Uzbeks =

This is a timeline of the Uzbeks.

== 15th century ==
| Year | Date | Event |
|---|---|---|
| 1412 | | Abu'l-Khayr Khan, a descendant of Genghis Khan's grandson Shiban, is born |
| 1428 | | Uzbek Khanate: Abu'l-Khayr Khan consolidates the Shaybanids and takes control of Sighnaq, Suzaq, Arquq, Uzgen, and Yasi |
| 1451 | | Uzbek Khanate: Abu'l-Khayr Khan aids Abu Sa'id Mirza in claiming the Timurid throne |
| 1468 | | Uzbek Khanate: Abu'l-Khayr Khan dies and his realm descends into chaos |

== 16th century ==
| Year | Date | Event |
|---|---|---|
| 1501 | | Muhammad Shaybani, grandson of Abu'l-Khayr Khan, defeats Babur at the Battle of Sar-i Pul |
| 1503 | | Muhammad Shaybani takes Samarkand, Bukhara, Tashkent, and Andijan |
| 1505 | | Khanate of Bukhara: Muhammad Shaybani takes Urgench |
| 1507 | | Khanate of Bukhara: Muhammad Shaybani takes Herat |
| 1510 | 2 December | Battle of Marv: Muhammad Shaybani is defeated and killed by Ismail I, losing control of Hisar, Kunduz, Kulab, and Badakhshan to Babur |
| 1512 | | Khanate of Bukhara: Samarkand is lost to Babur |
| 1512 | | Khanate of Bukhara: Ubaydullah bin Mahmud bin Shah Budagh defeats a Safavid invasion |
| 1549 | | Khanate of Bukhara: An invasion by Humayun is defeated |
| 1557 | | Khanate of Bukhara: Abdullah Khan II becomes de facto ruler |
| 1573 | | Khanate of Bukhara: Abdullah Khan II takes Balkh |
| 1583 | | Khanate of Bukhara: Abdullah Khan II becomes khan |
| 1584 | | Khanate of Bukhara: Abdullah Khan II takes Badakhshan |
| 1588 | | Khanate of Bukhara: Abdullah Khan II takes Herat |
| 1589 | | Khanate of Bukhara: Abdullah Khan II takes Mashhad |
| 1593 | | Khanate of Bukhara: Abdullah Khan II invades Khwarezm |
| 1595 | | Khanate of Bukhara: Abdullah Khan II conquers Khwarezm |
| 1598 | | Khanate of Bukhara: Abdullah Khan II dies and is succeeded by his son Abdul-Mo'min bin Abdullah Khan, who is assassinated within the year; Jani Beg Khan becomes nominal ruler while Din Muhammad takes control of the state |
| 1598 | August | Khanate of Bukhara: Abbas the Great invades and kills Din Muhammad |
| 1599 | | Khanate of Bukhara: Baqi Muhammad Khan defeats a Kazakh Khanate invasion |

== 17th century ==
| Year | Date | Event |
|---|---|---|
| 1603 | | Khanate of Bukhara: Baqi Muhammad Khan repels an invasion by Abbas the Great and subjugates Balkh and Badakhshan |
| 1605 | | Khanate of Bukhara: Baqi Muhammad Khan dies and is succeeded by his brother Vali Muhammad Khan |
| 1611 | | Khanate of Bukhara: Baqi Muhammad Khan is overthrown and replaced by Imam Quli Khan |
| 1613 | | Khanate of Bukhara: Imam Quli Khan takes Tashkent and gives it to Kazakh khan Tarsun |
| 1645 | | Khanate of Bukhara: Abdul Aziz Khan becomes khan |
| 1647 | | Khanate of Bukhara: A Mughal invasion is defeated |
| 1685 | | Khanate of Bukhara: An invasion by the Khanate of Khiva is defeated |

== 18th century ==
| Year | Date | Event |
|---|---|---|
| 1709 | | Khanate of Bukhara: Ferghana is lost to the Khanate of Kokand |
| 1709 | | Khanate of Kokand: Shahrukh Bek, leader of Uzbek Ming tribe established Khanate of Kokand |
| 1737 | | Nader's Central Asian Campaign: Nader Shah takes Balkh |
| 1740 | | Nader's Central Asian Campaign: Nader Shah occupies territories south of the Amu Darya and installs Muhammad Hakim as ruler |
| 1753 | | Khanate of Bukhara: Muhammad Rahim becomes formal ruler of the khanate, beginning Manghud domination |
| 1754 | | Khanate of Bukhara: Muhammad Rahim fails to take Ura Tepe |
| 1758 | 24 March | Khanate of Bukhara: Muhammad Rahim dies, sparking numerous rebellions; he is succeeded by his uncle Daniyal Bey |
| 1784 | | Khanate of Bukhara: Daniyal Bey hands over power to his son Shah Murad bin Daniyal Bey due to a rebellion |

== 19th century ==
| Year | Date | Event |
|---|---|---|
| 1800 | | Emirate of Bukhara: Shah Murad bin Daniyal Bey is succeeded by his son Haydar Tora bin Shah Murad |
| 1821 | | Emirate of Bukhara: A nomad uprising breaks out |
| 1827 | | Emirate of Bukhara: Nasrullah Khan comes to power after infighting due to his father's death |
| 1851 | | Emirate of Bukhara: Balkh is taken by Dost Mohammad Khan |
| 1860 | | Emirate of Bukhara: Nasrullah Khan is succeeded by his son Muzaffar al-Din bin Nasr-Allah |
| 1866 | | Emirate of Bukhara: Russians take Khujand, Ura Tepe, and Jizak |
| 1868 | | Emirate of Bukhara: Russians take Samarkand and the emirate becomes a protectorate |
| 1885 | | Emirate of Bukhara: Okhrana is set up in Bukhara |

== 20th century ==
| Year | Date | Event |
|---|---|---|
| 1920 | 2 September | Emirate of Bukhara: Mohammed Alim Khan is overthrown by the Soviet Union; so ends the Emirate of Bukhara |

== See also ==
- Shaybanids
- Manghud

== Bibliography ==
- Adle, Chahryar (2003), History of Civilizations of Central Asia 5
- Bregel, Yuri (2003), An Historical Atlas of Central Asia, Brill
- Grousset, Rene (1970), Empire of the Steppes
- Sinor, Denis (1990), The Cambridge History of Early Inner Asia, Volume 1, Cambridge University Press
- Twitchett, Denis (1998), The Cambridge History of China Volume 7 The Ming Dynasty, 1368—1644, Part I, Cambridge University Press
