= Battle of Tashkent (1603) =

Battle between the Kazakh Khanate and Khanate of Bukhara

- Part of Kazakh–Uzbek Wars
Date	1603
Location	Tashkent, Uzbekistan
Result	Kazakh victory

Belligerents
Kazakh Khanate	Khanate of Bukhara

Commanders and leaders
(Kazakh Khanate) Keldi-Muhammad	(Khanate of Bukhara) Baqi Muhammad Khan

The Battle of Tashkent (1603) was a military confrontation between Kazakh–Kyrgyz forces led by Keldi-Muhammad against the Khanate of Bukhara in 1603.

== Background ==
At the very beginning of the 17th century, in 1601, a change of ruling dynasty took place in the Khanate of Bukhara. Power shifted from the Shaybanids, who had ruled Central Asia for about a century, to the Ashtarkhanid dynasty.

The name of the dynasty is linked to the origin of its founder, Jani Muhammad Sultan, who descended from the Jochids of Astrakhan (Haji-Tarkhan). He was a descendant of Tokai-Timur, the thirteenth son of Jochi. For this reason, some researchers also refer to the Ashtarkhanids as the Janid dynasty, after Jani Muhammad Khan. The first ruler of this dynasty to ascend the khan's throne was Baki-Muhammad, the second son of Jani Muhammad Sultan.

== Battle ==
In the early 17th century, relations between the Bukhara Khanate and the Kazakh Khanate remained tense. Despite the treaty, the rulers of Bukhara sought to reclaim control over Tashkent, which had been under Kazakh rule since the late 16th century. In the autumn of 1603, as reported by Mahmud ibn Wali in Bahr al-Asrar, Baki-Muhammad Khan attempted to seize the city. However, his forces were defeated by the army of the Kazakh ruler of Tashkent, Keldi-Muhammad Khan. Pursuing the retreating Ashtarkhanids, the combined Kazakh–Kyrgyz army reached Samarkand, but the siege of the city was unsuccessful. As a result, Keldi-Muhammad Khan was forced to retreat back to Tashkent.
