= Yalangtoʻsh Bakhodir =

Uzbek military commander, emir of Samarkand

Yalangtoʻsh Bahodir
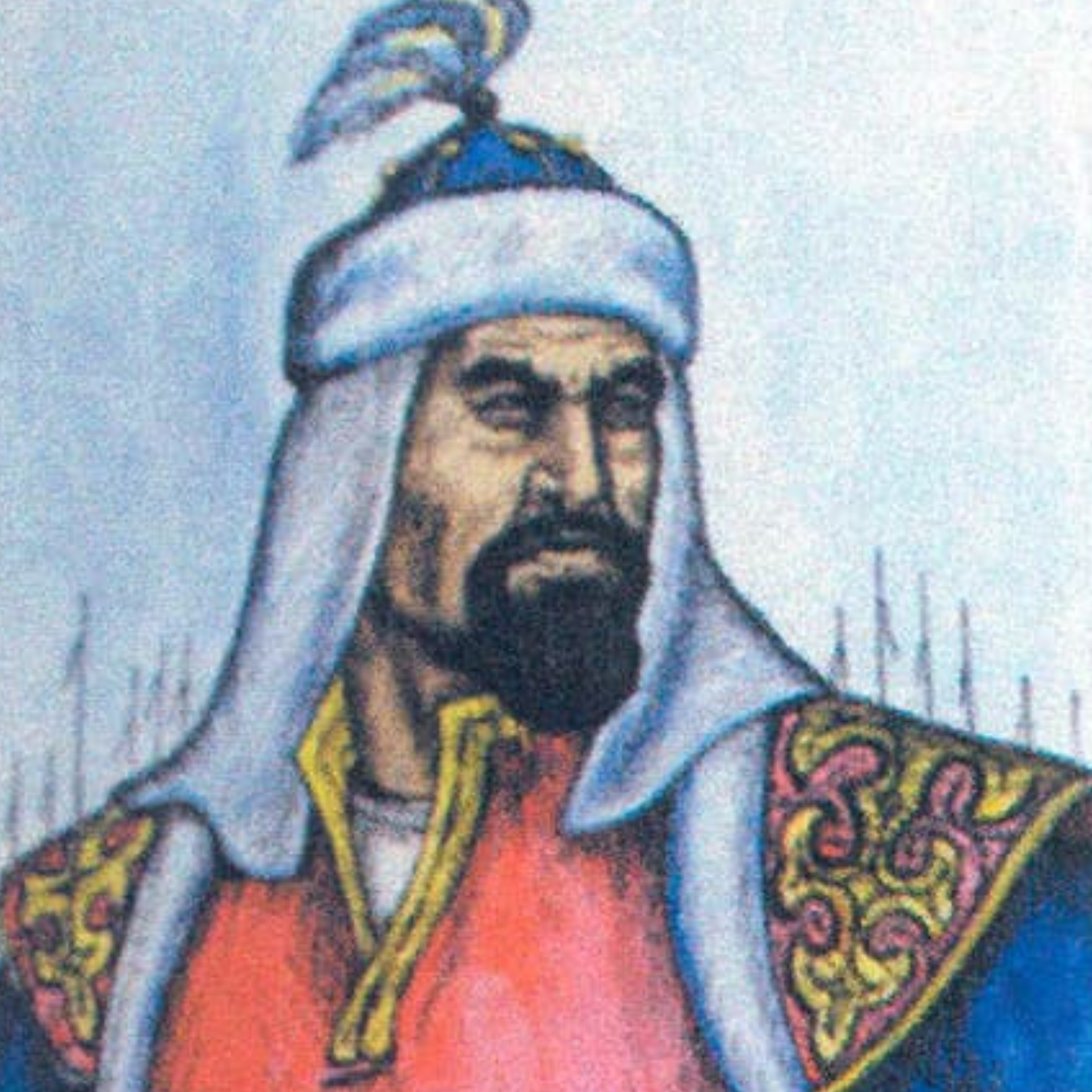
- Yalangtoʻsh Bakhodir
- Governor of Samarkand: 1626–1656
- Born: Abdulkarim Yalangtoʻsh Bahodir Boyxoji oʻgʻli 1578; Bukhara, Khanate of Bukhara
- Died: 1656 (aged 77–78); Samarqand, Khanate of Bukhara
- Burial: Samarqand
- Father: Boyxoji
- Religion: Sunni Islam

Yalangtoʻsh Bahodir (Persian: یلنگ‌تاش بهادر) 1578, Bukhara, Bukhara Khanate - 1656, Samarkand, Bukhara Khanate), a major representative of the military-owning nobility during the Janid era. He belonged to the Olchin tribe of Uzbeks and served as the governor of Samarkand since 1626. Yalangtosh Bahadir was brought up under Bukhara Khan Abdulla Khan

== Correct spelling of name ==
In the documents related to him, his name is written as Yalangtosh biy. The name of this commander in the form of Yalangtoshbi is found in written sources written both in the Bukhara Khanate and in the Safavid state.

In the historiography of the Russian Empire, he was called only Yalangtushbi. Brockhaus and Yefron named him "Yalantush Bahadur" in their encyclopedic dictionary.

Only the name Yalangtushbi is used in world oriental literature.

The name of Boykhoja's son Yalantash is engraved on the tombstone.

The name "Yalantosh Bohodur" is engraved in the modern Uzbek language on the stone tablet placed next to his grave.

== Education ==
Yalangtush-biy was educated in Bukhara in a kuttab and madrasah during the reign of the Uzbek khan Abdullah Khan. According to written sources, Yalangtush-biy's career developed as follows: his father Boykhoji was an emir - one of the highest dignitaries of the Shibanid khans in Bukhara, so Yalangtush-biy was raised from childhood at the court of the Bukhara khans from the Shibanid dynasty. At school, Yalangtush-biy studied Persian. All legal documents drawn up on his behalf, including the inscription on one of the madrassas on Registan Square, are written in Persian, Arabic and Chagatai.

== Origin ==
Nalangtosh Bahadir was born in Bukhara.

Nalangtosh Bahadir was from the alchin (cherry) clan of Uzbeks. His father was called Boykhoji. His father and his son were students of Khoja Hashim Dahbetii, a descendant of the famous Naqshbandi Sufi leader Mahdumi Azam (1461-1542). Yalangtoshbi and his daughters: Iqlima bonu, Ayibibi were buried in the cemetery in Dahbet, under the feet of Khoja Hashim Dahbeti. According to the document of 1643, it was his literate son Boybek. But he died before his father, according to the document of 1650, he died.

== Literacy and subsequent political activity ==
In Bukhara, he learned the science of management and military work very early. At this event, the mayor notices Yalangtosh's high intelligence for his age.

Yalangtosh knew the Persian language very well. All legal documents drawn up in his name, as well as an inscription in one of the madrasas on Registan Square, are written in Persian.

After the death of Baqi Muhammad Khan janid dynasty in 1605, Yalangtosh first supported Vali Muhammad Khan, and then in 1611 he opposed him by supporting another Ashtarkhanid ruler, Imam Qulikhan. As a result, in 1612, the new khan appointed Yalangtosh as the amir (representative) of Samarkand, and later as the patriarch.

He owned large areas in various parts of Central Asia. For example, on April 30, 1650, a will was drawn up about "buying 2/6 of a garden and 2/6 of land in Posarchak quarter of Shovdar district of Samarkand from Niyozbek and Khojibek, sons of Boyhojibi, son of Yalantoshboy Ashura Qushbegi, for 1000 coins.".

== Yalangtush and Abdulaziz Khan ==
In 1645, Abdulaziz Khan ascended the throne in Bukhara and, probably, Yalangtushbiy was again appointed khokim of Samarkand.

In 1646, Abdulaziz Khan came to the aid of the Kazakhs in the fight against the Dzungars.

== Military services ==
In 1611, he actively participated in the enthronement of Imam Qulikhan. After that, the position of Yalangtosh Bahadur increased, he began to rule Samarkand practically independently from 1626. He was given the title of father. Yalangtosh was Bahadur's own army, and as a result of his raids on the surrounding districts, he collected a lot of material resources. Yalangtosh Bahadir actively participated in all military operations of the Bukhara Khanate. For example, in 1623 and 1631, when the Iranian troops came to Balkh province, a large army led by Yalangtosh Bahadir came to the aid of the Governor of Balkh, Nadr Muhammad Khan.

In 1640, Imam Quli Khan sent a message to Moscow through ambassadors, stating that he was ready to send 12 amirs and a large army under the leadership of Yalangtosh Bahadur to fight the Russian state against the Kalmyks. In 1642, when Imam Quli Khan became blind, Yalangtosh Bahadir and other emirs brought Nadr Muhammad from Balkh and put him on the throne. Nadr Muhammed Yalangtosh gave Darah e Suf region, Molgan, Kahmerd and the Tulchichi, Saiganchi, Zirangi, Kilachi, Hazara-Nikudari tribes around Kabul with their herbs in the form of iqta. In 1645, Yalangtosh Bahadir quarreled with Nadr Muhammad Khan in Bukhara and led the revolt of the emirs against the Khan in Khojand. The rebels marched to Bukhara, taking Sultan Abdulaziz, who was sent from Bukhara to suppress the rebellion, as a prisoner. In Oktepa region west of Bukhara, they proclaimed Abdulaziz Khan and then besieged the capital. Nadr Muhammad Khan was forced to leave the city after a 3-month siege. He asked the Baburis for help from Shah Jahan. In 1646, Shah Jahan sent his youngest son Muradbakhsh with a large army to Balkh. Instead of protecting the Balkh province, this army invaded it. The Baburites ruled Balkh for more than 2 years, but they could not establish themselves there. In the summer of 1648, Abdulaziz Khan marched to Balkh with an army of 200,000 people and recaptured this region from the Baburites, which included an army led by Yalangtosh Bahadur.

Barefoot Bahadir was distinguished by his determination and military pragmatism and earned the title of hero.

In 1612, he led the soldiers of Imam Quli Khan and conquered Tashkent and Turkestan.

In 1612, Imamkuli Khan led his soldiers to battle against Kazakh Khan Esimkhan.

In 1614, he marched to Khurasan, and in 1618 to Herat. In the 1620s, he fought in the territory of present-day Afghanistan, protecting the southern borders of the Ashtarkhanid state.

In 1621, Tursun became the commander-in-chief of the Ashtarkhanid army when repelling the attack of the Kazakh warriors of the sultan.

In 1628, on the orders of Imam Quli Khan, Kazakh Abuli killed Sultan in Tashkent and forced him to flee to Kashgar.

In 1636, the army of Imamkuli Khan, led by Yalangtosh, marched to Sayram and attacked the surrounding Kazakh tribes. The walk extended to the Kipchak steppes.

In 1640, the army led by Yalangtosh destroyed the Dzungars who invaded the lands of Kazakhs and nomadic Uzbeks. Later, Yalangtosh became the head of the district (commander of an army of 10,000 people). The military invasion of the Dzungars did not end, and later the Dzungars launched devastating attacks on the Zhetysu lands. Barefoot Bahadir comes from Samarkand with a well-armed military unit of 30,000 men to collect taxes from the Kazakhs. The army of Yalangtosh helps to liberate Zhetysu from the invading Dzungars under the leadership of Batir-huntoyji.

In 1643, Yalangtosh Bahadir came to the aid of the Kazakh Khan Jangir Khan in the battle of Orbulok. This time, 20,000 soldiers were enough to influence the change of the battle in a positive direction.

In 1646, a conflict arose between Bukhara Khan Abdulaziz Khan and Shah Jahan. Both the Khanate of Bukhara and the Great Mongol Empire claimed the important cities of Khurasan and Balkh. As a result, war broke out. According to Khajamquli Balkhi's historical source "History of Kipchakkhani", Yalangtosh Bahadir, on the instructions of Abdulaziz Khan, formed an army of 100 thousand people consisting of Bukhara warriors and Kazakh volunteer soldiers and defeated the army of Shahjahan. This time, Jangir Khan from the Kazakh steppes comes to help the Ashtarkhanids and Yalangtosh. Later, Yalangtosh made many successful campaigns, captured and plundered Mashhad, and brought many captive masters from there.

== Creative work ==
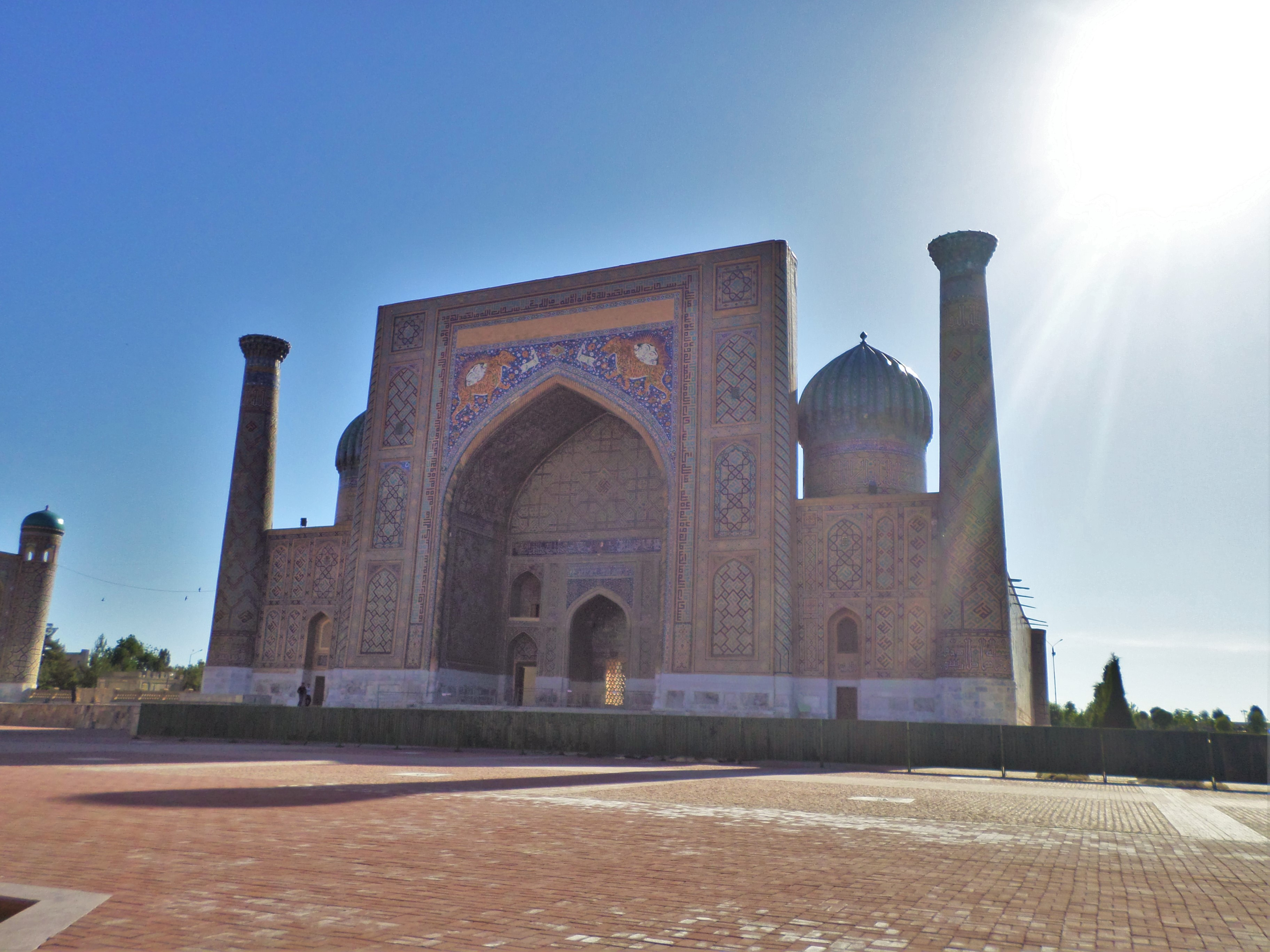
The Sherdar Madrasa on the Registan of Samarkand

Ya.b. he paid great attention to landscaping and construction works, including the construction of the Sherdar Madrasa, the Tilakari Madrasa, Makhdumi Azam Mosque, Khanaqosi (1618) and others in Samarkand. Abu Tahirhojanit wrote in "Samarija" that "Naked Bahadur's grave is in Dahbed near Samarkand, under the feet of Makhdumi Azam, on the couch, inside the tomb wall." There are many legends and legends about Yalangtosh Bahadir among the people (for example, the story "Nalangtosh Batir").

Yalangtosh Bahadir is also known for his contribution to the construction of new structures and the support of art.

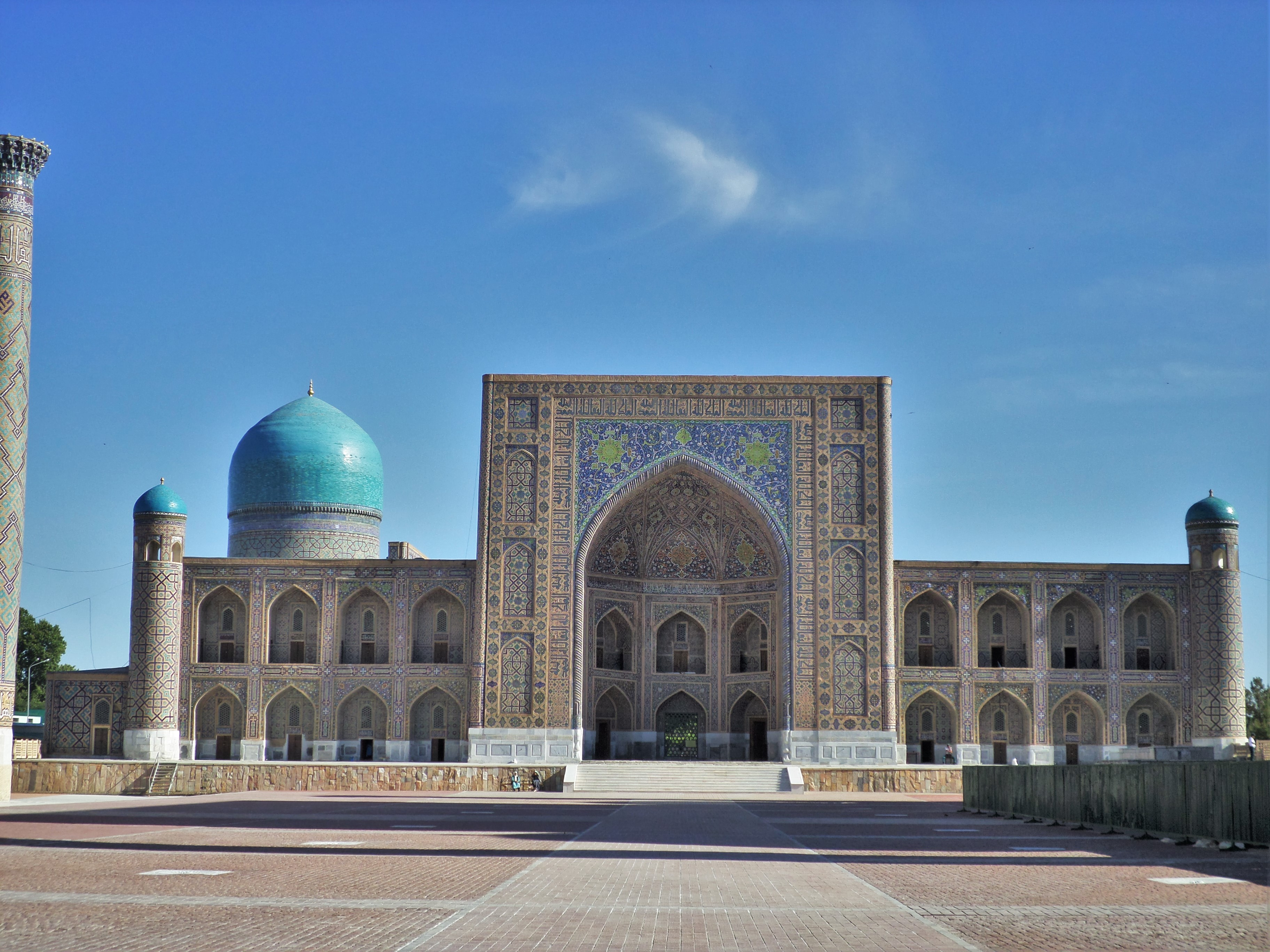
Tilya Kori Madrasa, in Samarkand Registon.

With the help of Yalangtosh Bahadir, the Sherdar madrasa was built in the heart of Samarkand on Registan Square, and eventually this building became a historical and cultural monument.

One of the inscriptions written in Persian on the wall of the Sherdar madrasa says that "the commander-in-chief, righteous Yalangtosh Bahadir" was its founder.

He also built the Tilla-Kori madrasa in Samarkand. These architectural structures are the decoration of modern Samarkand and attract tourists from all over the world.

In the history of the art of architecture of the whole East, these buildings rank high in terms of craftsmanship.

== Descendants ==
After the death of Amir Boybek, the only son of the Yalangtoshbi family, there were no male descendants left from Yalangtoshbi, and one of his daughters continued the construction of the madrasa in Registan.

== Memorial ==
Barefoot Bahadir was buried under the feet of his spiritual mentor in Dahbet, 12 km from Samarkand. His daughters are also buried here.

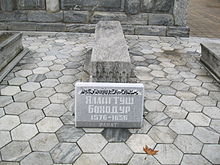
Tombstone of the Naked Bahadur in Dahbet

One of the central streets of modern Samarkand is named Yalangtosh Bahadir.

In 2024, Jahangir Ahmedov made a film in honor of Yalangtoʻsh Bakhodir, and the film was considered a turning point in Uzbek cinema.

== Sources ==
- Samarkand and photography
- Kattaev Komilkhan, "Makhdumi Azam and Daxbed". Samarkand, 1994.
- Abu Tahirkhoja, Samaria, T.. 1991.

== Literature ==
- Axmedov B.A., Istoriya Balxa, T., 1982;
- Axmedov B.A., Istorikogeograficheskaya literatura Sredney Azii XVI—XVIII vv., T., 1985;
- Istoriya Uzbekistana, t. 3, T., 1993.
- Xoroshxin A. P. Sbornik statey kasayuщixsya Turkestanskogo kraya A. P. Xoroshxina.. — S.Peterburg., 1876;
- D.I. Evarnitskіy. Putevoditel po Sredney Azіi. Otʼ Baku do Tashkenta.— Tashkent., 1893. — S. 73–77.
- V.I. Masalskіy. TURKYeSTANSKІY KRAY. — S.-PYeTYeRBURGЪ., 1913. — T. 12.
- Burton Audrey. The Bukharans. A dynastic, diplomatic and commercial history 1550–1702. — Curzon, 1997. — P. 207, 216.
- History of civilizations of Central Asia / Editors: Chahryar Adle and Irfan Habib. Co-editor: Karl M. Baypakov. — UNESCO publishing, 2003. — Vol. V. — P. 47–48.
- Kattaev Komilxon. Maxdumi Aʼzam va Daxbed. — Samarqand, 1994.
- Xafiz-i Tanish Buxari Sharaf-nama-yi shaxi (Kniga shaxskoy slavi). Chast 1. Perevod s persidskogo, vvedenie, primechaniya i ukazateli. M.,1983
- Kattaev K., Maxdumi Aʼzam va Daxbed. Samarqand, 1994, s.49,75
- Ziyaev A., „Silsilat as-salatin“ kak istoricheskiy istochnik. T., 1990, s.56
- R.D. McChesney The Amirs of Muslim Central Asia in the XVIIth century in Journal of the Economic and Social History of the Orient Vol. 26, No. 1 (1983).
