= Ashtrakhanids =

(H)Ashtrakhanids may refer to the following dynasties in Central Asia :

- the Khans of the Astrakhan Khanate
- their Ashtarkhanid branch ruling the Khanate of Bukhara (1599-1785)
