= Sultan Abdu'l-Aziz Khan =

Sultan Abdu'l-Aziz Khan may refer to:

- Abdu'l-Aziz (1614–1683), ruler of the Khanate of Bukhara
- Abdulaziz (1830–1876), Ottoman sultan
