= Nawruz Ahmad (Baraq Khan) =

Nawruz Ahmad Baraq Khan
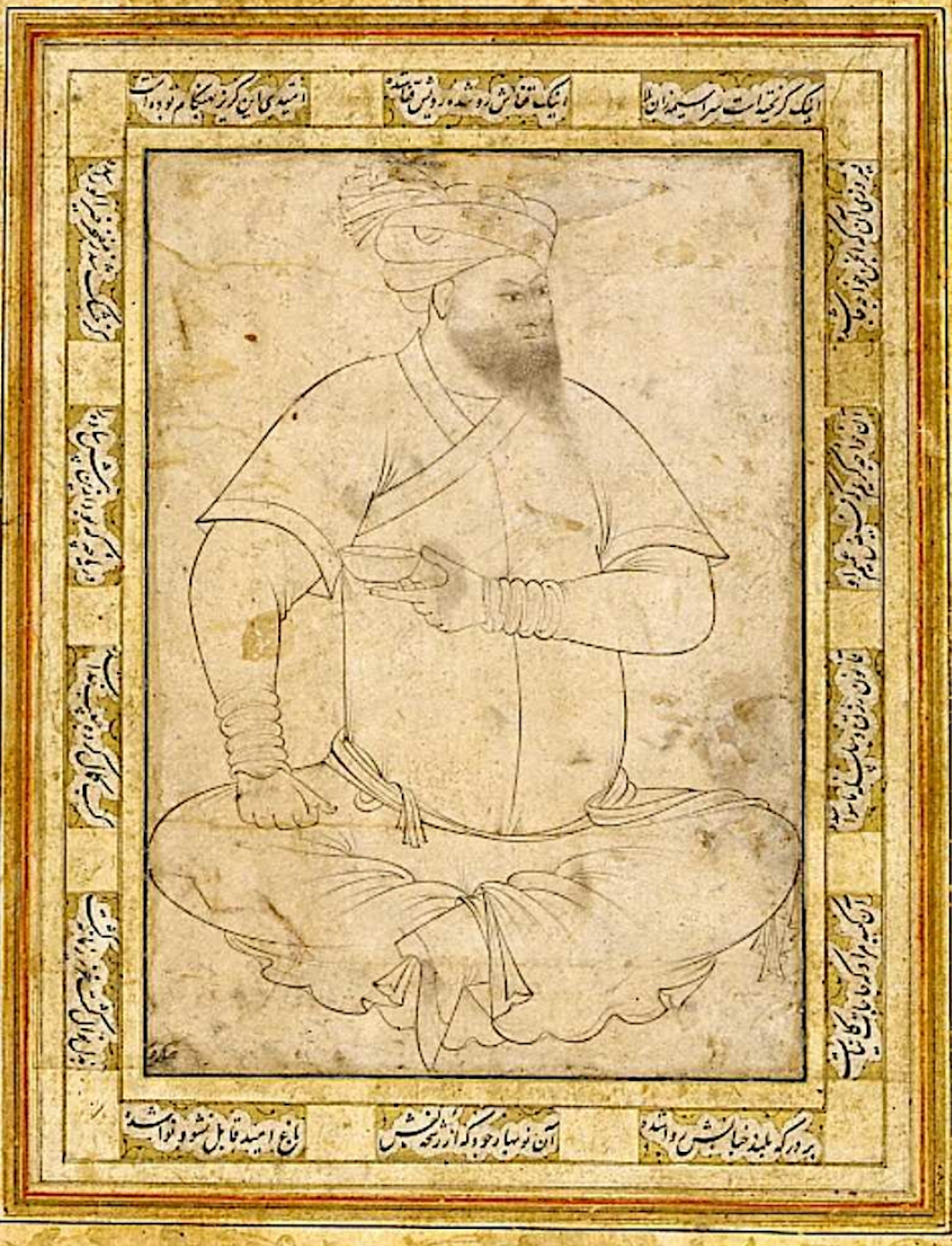
- Nawruz Ahmad (Baraq Khan) (1552–1556).

Khan of the Uzbek Khanate
- Reign: 1552 – 1556
- Predecessor: Abdul-Latif ibn Kuchkunchi Muhammad (1540–1552)
- Successor: Pir Muhammad I ibn Jani Beg
- Born: Central Asia
- Died: 1556
- House: Borjigin
- Dynasty: Shaybanids
- Father: Suyūnkhuja Khān
- Religion: Sunni Islam

Nawruz Ahmad (Baraq Khan) (Note: Chagatai and Persian: نوروز احمد براق خان) (ruled 1552-1556) was Khan of Tashkent, and a ruler of the Khanate of Bukhara, belonging to the Shaybanid dynasty. He was a son of Suyūnkhuja Khān.

In 1552, Barak Khān attacked the Jani-Begid territory between Samarqand and Bukhara, and forced them to abandon their dominion. After the death of 'Abd al-Latif, the Khanate of Bukhara then passed into the hands of Barak Khān, and he moved his capital from Tashkent to Samarkand.

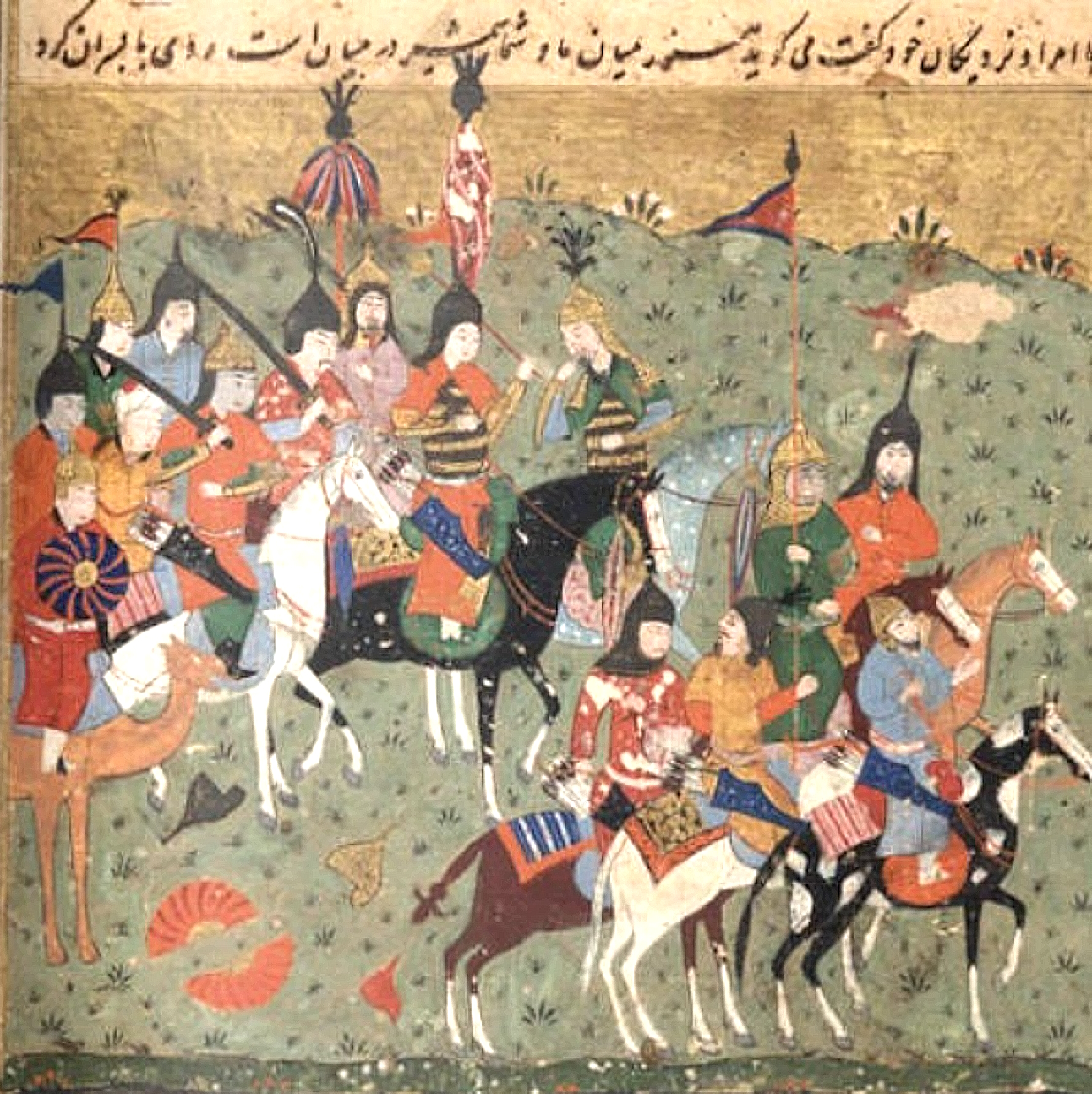
Army in the steppe, ca. 1540, Tashkent.

He also fought against the Chaghatay Khanate in the east.
