= Nadr Muhammad Khan =

Khan of Bukhara from 1642 to 1645

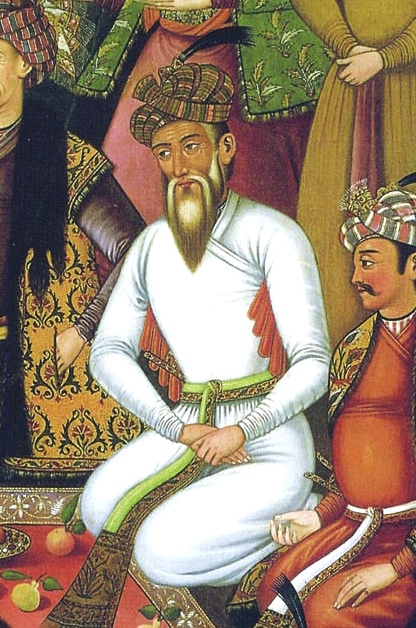
- Nadar Mohammad Khan (in a meeting with Shah Abbas II, c. 1647) Chehel Sotoun frescoe, dated c. 1650

Khan of the Bukhara Khanate
- Reign: 1642–1645
- Predecessor: Imam Quli Khan
- Successor: Abd al-Aziz Khan
- Died: 1651
- Issue: Abd al-Aziz Khan
- House: Borjigin
- Dynasty: Janids
- Father: Din Muhammad Khan
- Religion: Sunni Islam

Nadr Muhammad Khan, also Nadar Mohammad Khan (ruled 1642–1645), was a ruler of the Khanate of Bukhara. He succeeded his brother Imam Quli Khan. He was deposed in 1645, and died in 1651.

After being deposed, he is known to have requested the support of the Safavid Empire ruler Abbas II. He visited Isfahan in 1647, and his visit is recorded in a frescoe at the Chehel Sotoun Palace, where his delegation is seen facing the court of Abbas II. The painting is dated to 1666 at the latest (when it was mentioned by Jean Chardin during a visit in Isfahan), so was made shortly after Nadr Muhammad Khan's visit.

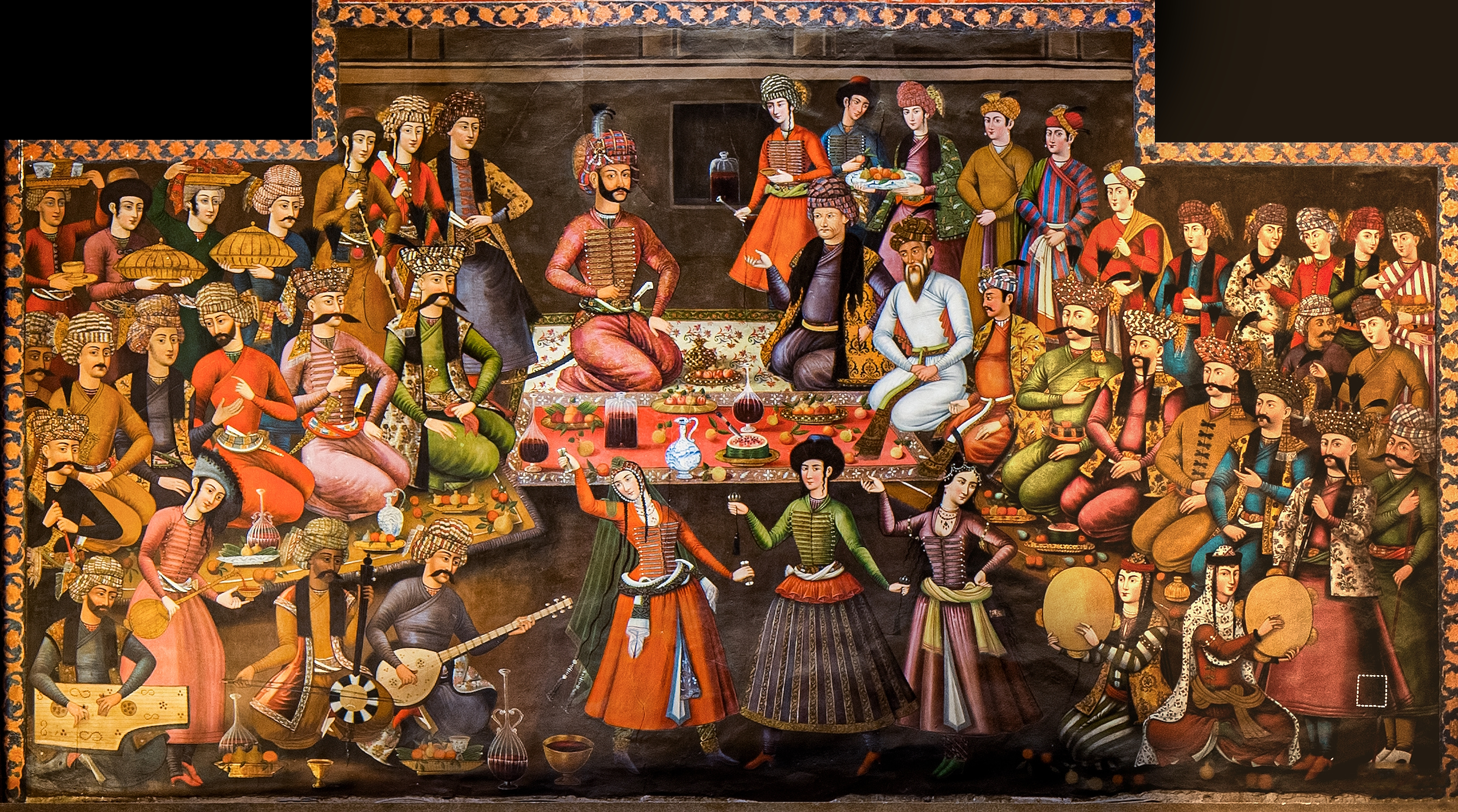
Meeting of Abbas II and Nadr Muhammad Khan at the Chehel Sotoun Palace in Isfahan, in 1647. Painting dated to 1647-66
