= Imam Quli Khan of Bukhara =

Khan of Bukhara from 1611 to 1642

Imam Quli Khan
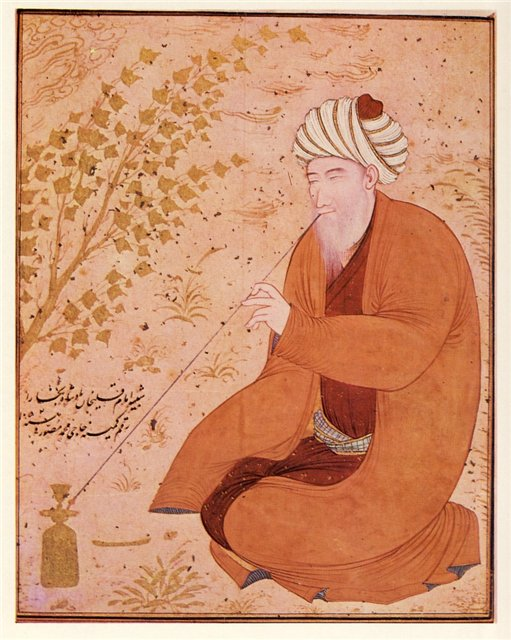
- Imam Quli Khan, the ruler of the Bukharan Khanate from 1611 to 1642. Painted during his stay in Safavid Iran by Muhammad Musawwir

Khan of the Bukhara Khanate
- Reign: 1611, 1611 – 1644
- Predecessor: Vali Muhammad Khan
- Successor: Vali Muhammad Khan (1 year); Nadr Muhammad Khan
- Born: 1582
- Died: 1644 (aged 61–62); Mecca
- House: Borjigin
- Dynasty: Janid
- Father: Din Muhammad Khan
- Religion: Sunni Islam

Imam Quli Khan (1582–1644, Chagatai and Persian: امام قلی خان) was the son of Din Muhammad Khan and the third ruler of the Bukhara Khanate, who reigned from 1611 to 1642.

== Reign ==
Imam Quli Khan belonged to Ashtarkhanid dynasty of Uzbeks. During the reign of Imam Quli Khan, the Bukhara khanate achieved the most significant power for the entire period of its existence. Despite a successful foreign policy, Imam Quli Khan was unable to completely overcome the internal contradictions in the state associated with the separatism of certain Uzbek tribes. In 1615, Imam Quli Khan sent ambassadors to the descendant of Babur, Emperor Jahangir of India. The letter from Imam Quli Khan was accompanied by an additional letter from the descendant of the famous theologian Khoja Hashim Dahbedi. The ambassadors were greeted friendly and Jahangir sent gifts and a poem to Imam Quli Khan, which he composed himself.

In 1618, the Safavid Shah Abbas I sent ambassadors to Imam Quli Khan with an offer of friendship. In April 1619, the ambassador of Imam Quli Khan was solemnly received by the Safavid shah.

During the reign of Imam Quli Khan, a number of famous architectural masterpieces were built, such as the cathedral mosque, the Tilakari Madrasa and the Sherdar Madrasa in Samarkand, Nodir-Divan-Begi madrasah in Bukhara and Samarkand, etc.

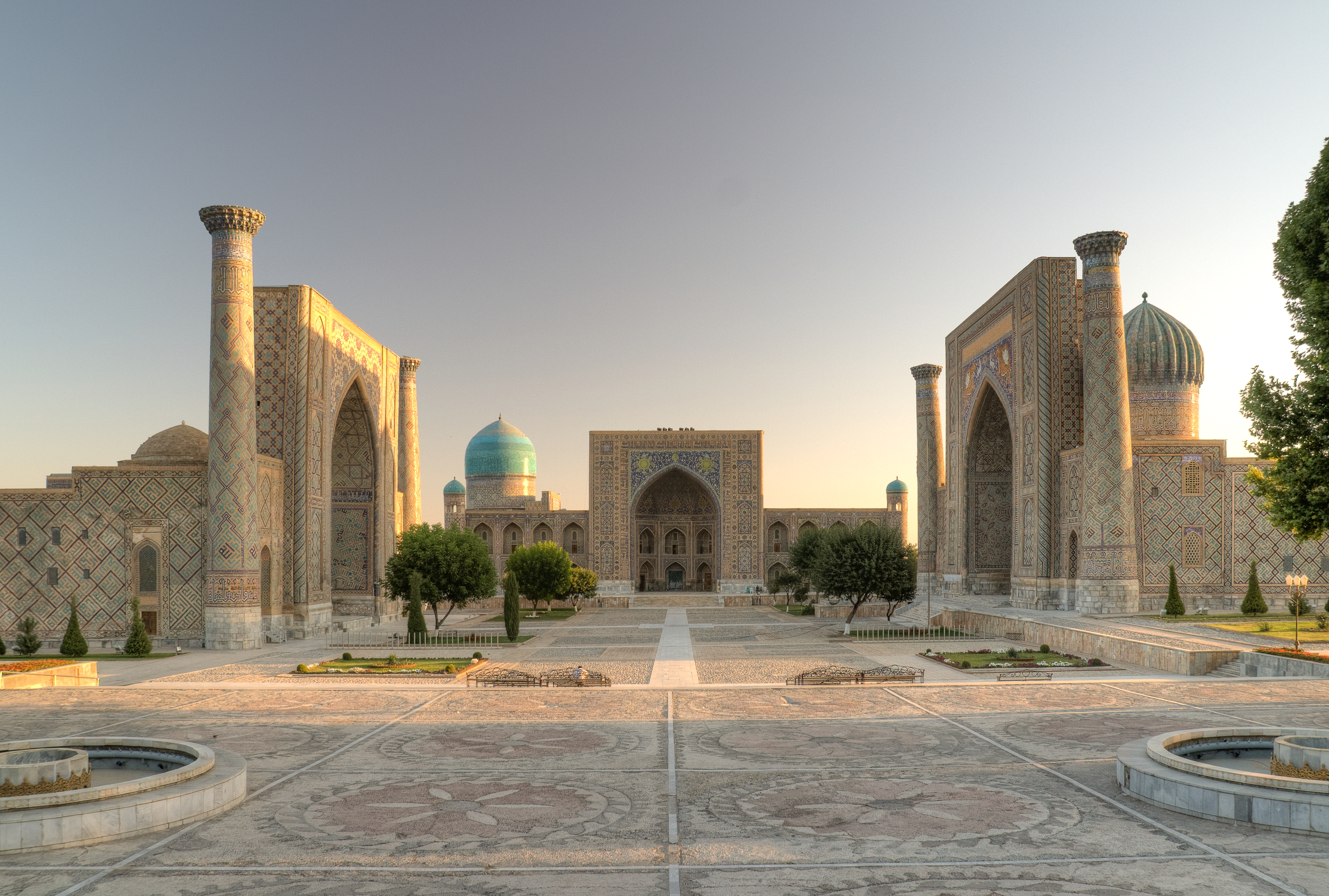
The Registan and its three madrasas (from left to right): the Ulugh Beg Madrasa (1417–1421), and the Tilakari Madrasa and Sherdar Madrasa, built in the 17th-century by the Khanate of Bukhara.

In the last years of his life, Imam Quli Khan began to see poorly and in 1642 he renounced the throne in favor of his brother Nadir Muhammad (1642–1645) and went on the Hajj. Imam Quli Khan visited the Safavid Shah, where the local artist Mo'en Mosavver painted his portrait.

Imam Quli Khan died in 1644 in Mecca and was buried in Medina.

== Sources ==
- Burton Audrey. The Bukharans. A dynastic, diplomatic and commercial history 1550−1702. — Curzon, 1997
- Robert D. McChesney. Central Asia vi. In the 16th-18th Centuries // Encyclopædia Iranica — Vol. V, Fasc. 2, pp. 176−193
- R. D. McChesney, Waqf in Central Asia: Four Hundred Years in the History of a Muslim Shrine, 1480–1889. Princeton university press, 1991
