= Vali Muhammad Khan =

Khan of Bukhara from 1605 to 1611

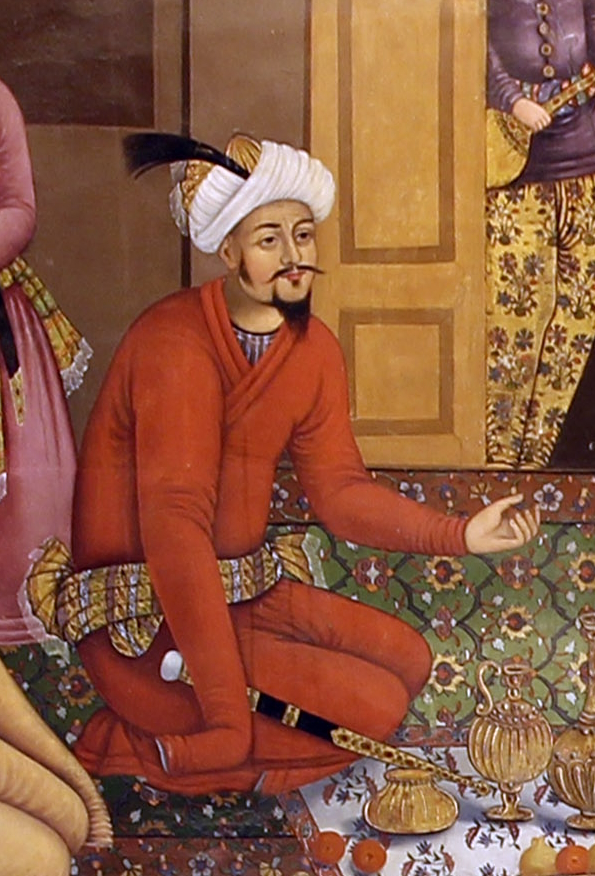
- Vali Muhammad Khan as depicted in the Chehel Sotoun in Isfahan, Iran. Circa 1647 painting

Khan of the Uzbek Khanate
- Reign: 1605-1611, 1611
- Predecessor: Baqi Muhammad Khan
- Successor: Imam Quli Khan
- Died: 1611
- House: Borjigin
- Dynasty: Janid
- Father: Jani Bek
- Religion: Sunni Islam

Valī Muḥammad Khān (Chagatai and Persian: ولی محمد خان) the son of Jani Bek was a leader of the Ashtarkhanid (Toqay-Timurid, Janid) dynasty in the Khanate of Bukhara from 1605–1611 AD.

He became leader after the death of his brother, Baqi Muhammad Khan, but was opposed by Imam Quli Khan.

In the struggle for power, the political elite of Bukhara supported Wali Mohammad, an older member of the Toqay-Timurid family, who was the governor in Balkh and Badakhshan.

Vali Muhammad Khan was not the popular choice to become leader and Imam Quli Khan enlisted support of many people, especially merchants and landlords. Upon hearing of a well organised assassination attempt, Vali Muhammad Khan fled the area and headed to the palace of Shah Abbas I to try and garner support. Abbas obliged the Khan, and gave him an army and sent him back to Bukhara, but the attempting at crushing the insurgency failed and Vali Muhammad Khan died. He was succeeded by Imam Quli Khan.

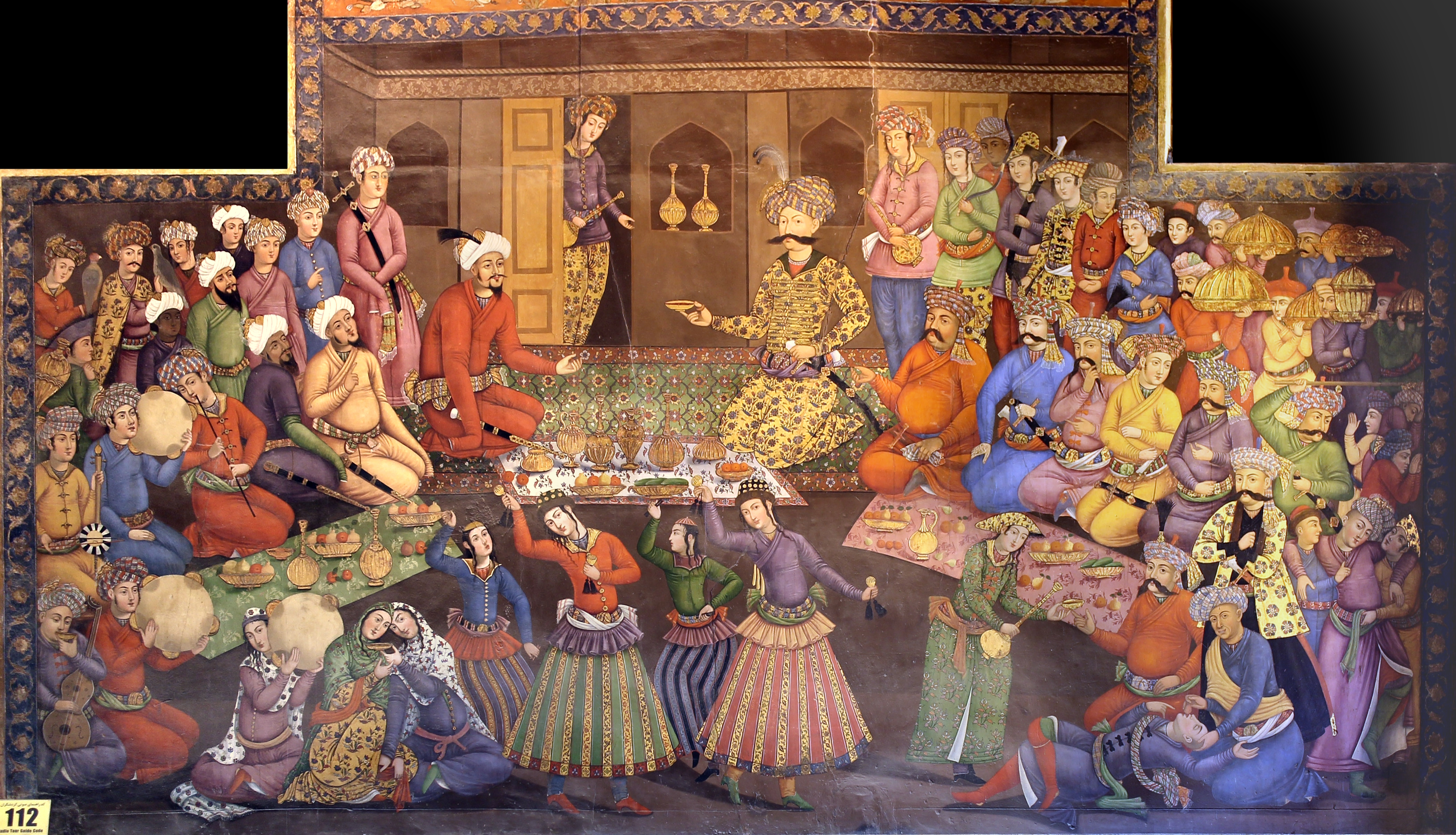
Vali Muhammad Khan being received by Shah Abbas I in the Palace of Chehel Sotoun in Isfahan. Circa 1650 painting

== Sources ==
- Burton Audrey. The Bukharans. A dynastic, diplomatic and commercial history 1550−1702. — Curzon, 1997
- Robert D. McChesney. Central Asia vi. In the 16th-18th Centuries // Encyclopædia Iranica — Vol. V, Fasc. 2, pp. 176−193
- R. D. McChesney, Waqf in Central Asia: Four Hundred Years in the History of a Muslim Shrine, 1480—1889. Princeton university press, 1991
