= Janid dynasty =

Uzbek dynasty in Central Asia (c. 1599-c. 1785)

Janids (Ashtarkhanids) (Toqay-Timurids)
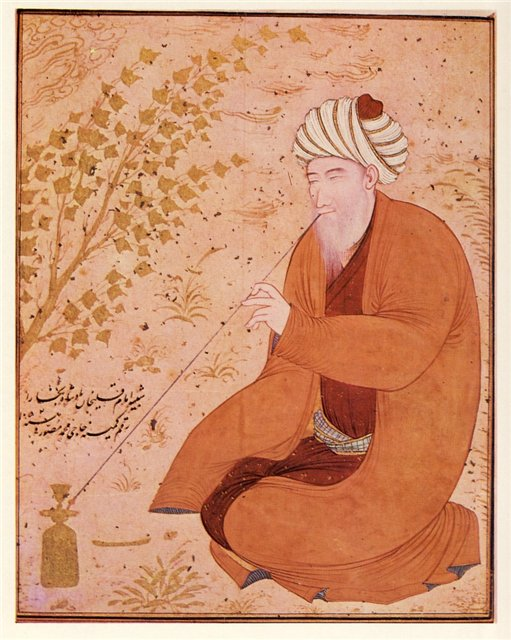
- Janid ruler Imam Quli Khan of Bukhara (r.1611 to 1642).
- Parent family: Borjigin
- Country: Uzbek Khanate; Astrakhan Khanate; Khanate of Bukhara
- Etymology: Jani Muhammad Beg (Jani Beg)
- Place of origin: Golden Horde, Astrakhan Khanate
- Founded: c. 1599
- Founder: Baqi Muhammad Khan
- Final ruler: Abu'l Ghazi (nominal)
- Titles: Khan
- Traditions: Sunni Islam
- Estates: Volga; Central Asia
- Dissolution: c. 1785

The Janids, also known as Ashtarkhanids or Toghay-Timurids was an Uzbek dynasty of Turco-Mongol origin in Central Asia. They succeeded the Shaybanids and ruled the Khanate of Bukhara from 1599 to 1785. The dynasty traced its lineage to Jochi, the eldest son of Genghis Khan, through Tuqa-Timur, one of Jochi’s sons, which formed the basis of their political legitimacy. The dynasty originated in Astrakhan, from which the name Ashtarkhanid is derived, and is also referred to in scholarly literature as the Toqay-Timurids.

Under the Janids, Bukhara functioned as an Islamic polity, characterized by the patronage of religious institutions, traditional governance, and the continued importance of Chinggisid legitimacy. The Janids maintained dynastic continuity until their displacement by the Manghit emirs in the mid-18th century.

During their rule, the Janids presided over a period in which the Khanate of Bukhara reached a period of notable cultural and political development. Janid rulers were notable patrons of architecture and learning, sponsoring the construction of mosques and madrasas in Bukhara and Samarkand, including major additions to the Registan ensemble, which became enduring symbols of Central Asian Islamic culture.

== History ==
In 1598, Abdullah Khan II from the Shaybanid dynasty, who had rule the Khanate of Bukhara since 1583, died.

After his death, the throne passed to his only son Abd al-Mumin, but he was soon killed by rebels. As the son of Abd al-Mumin was only two years old, the first cousin of Abdullah Khan II, Pir Muhammad II, was chosen as new Khan. This appointment was contested by several other rulers, like Tauekel Khan of the Kazakhs, Kasim Sultan and Baqi Muhammad, whose mother was Abdullah Khan's sister and whose father a prince from Astrakhan named Jani Muhammed Beg.

Baqi Muhammad was victorious and Pir Muhammad II was killed in battle. With his death, the Shaybanid dynasty ended, and Baqi Muhammad became the first Khan of the Janid or Ashtarkhanid dynasty.

The name Janid, comes from his father Jani Muhammed Beg. He was the son of Prince Yar Muhammed, who was a member of the Tuqay-Timurid who had ruled the Astrakhan Khanate, until they were chased by the Russians in 1555.

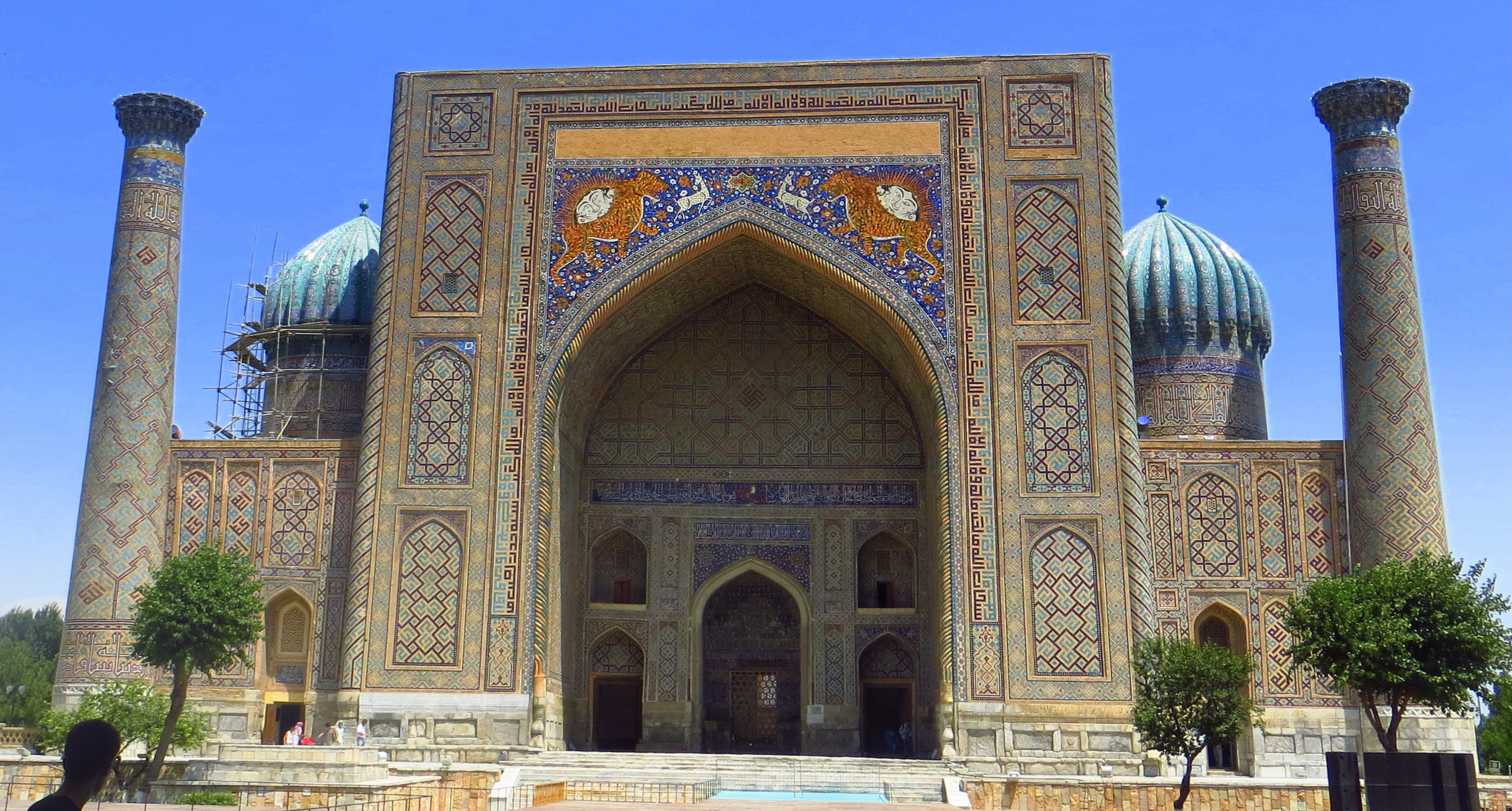
The Sherdar Madrasa, built between 1619 and 1636 by Governor of Samarkand Yalangtoʻsh Bakhodir, Khanate of Bukhara

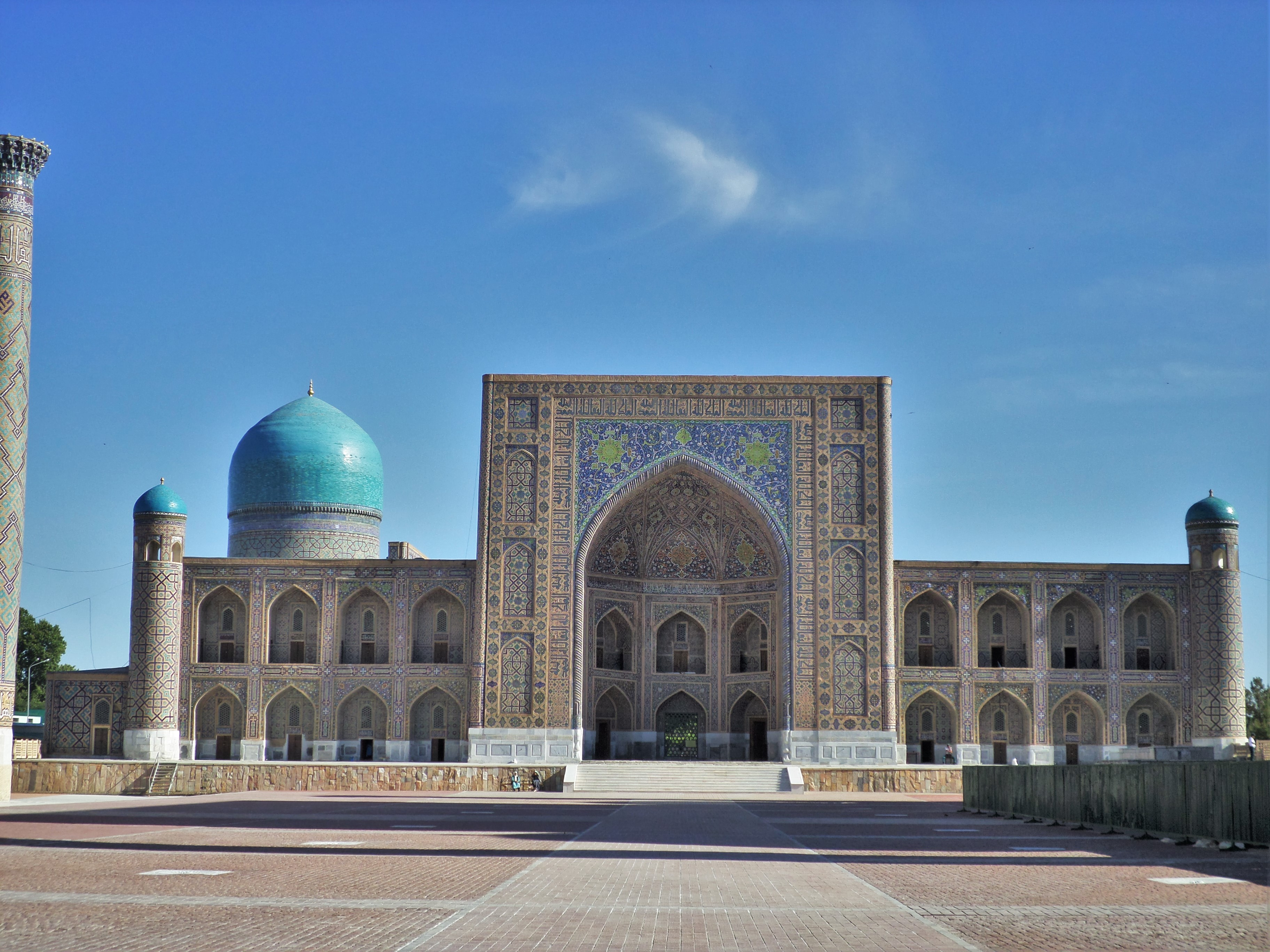
The Tilakari Madrasa, also built by Yalangtoʻsh Bakhodir, between 1646 and 1660. Samarqand Registan.

The Janid dynasty ruled the Bukhara Khanate from 1599 to 1785.
In 1740, Bukhara was conquered by Persia, but Abu al-Fayz Khan remained on the throne. The real power was in the hands of Ataliq Muhammad Rahim, who even had the Khan killed in 1747. The successors of the Khan were all puppets in the hands of their Ataliqs.This situation ended when the new Ataliq Shah Murad deposed Khan Abu'l Ghazi, pronounced himself Emir of Bukhara and created his own Manghud dynasty.

== Rulers ==
- Baqi Muhammad Khan (1599–1605)
- Vali Muhammad Khan (1605–1611)
- Imam Quli Khan (1611–1642)
- Nadr Muhammad Khan (1642–1645)
- Abd al-Aziz Khan (1645–1680)
- Subhan Quli Khan (1680–1702)
- Ubaidullah Khan (1702–1711)
- Abu al-Fayz Khan (1711–1747)
- Muhammad Abd al-Mumin (1747–1748, nominal)
- Muhammad Ubaidullah II (1748–1753, nominal)
- Abu'l Ghazi (1758–1785, nominal)

== Genealogy ==
House of Borjigin

Mongol Empire
Golden Horde
Blue Horde (Debatable)
Great Horde
Astrakhan Khanate
Bukhara Khanate

Temüjin r. 1206–1227
Jochi r. 1225–1227
Tuqa-Timur
Kay-Timur
Abay
Numqan
Qutluq-Timur
Uljay-Timur r. 1368–1368	Qutluq-Beg
Temür Qutlugh r. 1397–1399	Shadi Beg r. 1399–1407
Pulad r. 1407–1410	Timur r. 1410–1412	Ghiyath ad-Din II r. 1425–1426
Küchük Muhammad r. 1433–1459	Mustafa II r. 1431–1433
Mahmud r. 1459–1465 r. 1465–1466	Ahmad r. 1465–1481	Chuwaq
Qasim I r. 1466–1490	Abdul-Karim r. 1490–1504	Murtada r. 1486–1494 r. 1493–1494	Shaykh-Ahmad r. 1481–1493, 1494–1502	Sayyid-Ahmad III r. 1485–1502	Mangishlaq
Abdur-Rahman r. 1534–1538	Aq Kubek r. 1532–1534, 1541–1544	Berdi-Beg	Shaykh-Haydar r. 1538–1541	Qasim II r. 1504–1532	Yar-Muhammad
Yamghurchi r. 1544–1554	Darwish-Ali r. 1554–1556	Jani-Muhammad r. 1599–1603
Din-Muhammad	Baqi-Muhammad r. 1599–1605 r. 1603–1605	Wali-Muhammad r. 1605–1611, 1611–1611
Imam-Quli r. 1611–1611, 1611–1642	Nadir-Muhammad r. 1642–1645
Rajab-Muhammad	Abdul-Aziz r. 1645–1681	Subhan-Quli r. 1681–1702
Ibrahim	Ubaydullah II r. 1702–1711	Abu'l-Fayd r. 1711–1747
Abu'l-Ghazi r. 1758–1785	Abu'l-Mu'min r. 1747–1748	Ubaydullah III r. 1748–1753	Yulduz Begim	Muhammad-Rahim r. 1753–1758
Manghit dynasty

== Sources ==
- Thomas Welsford: Four Types of Loyalty in Early Modern Central Asia: The Tuqay-Timurid Takeover of Greater M War Al-Nahr, 1598-1605
