= Subhan Quli Khan =

Khan of Bukhara from 1681 to 1702

Subhan Quli Khan (Chagatai and Persian: سبحان قلی خان; 1625–1702) was the sixth ruler of the Bukhara Khanate, who reigned from 1681 to 1702.

Subhan Quli Khan belonged to Ashtarkhanid dynasty. In 1681 Abdulaziz Khan renounced the throne in favour of his brother Subhan Quli Khan. Prior to that, Subhan Quli Khan ruled Balkh from 1651 to 1680. On 2 February 1681, a khutba with the name of the new ruler Subhan Quli Khan was read in the mosques of Bukhara.

The economic situation in the country continued to deteriorate, internal political contradictions intensified every year, and Subhan Quli Khan had great difficulty coping with them. The separatism of the subjects of the Uzbek tribes greatly increased towards the end of the reign of Subhan Quli Khan.

Subhan Quli Khan himself was the author of several works on medicine and astrology. He had knowledge in medicine and was engaged in healing himself. His work on medicine "Subkhankuli's revival of medicine" ("Ihya at-tibb Subhani") was written in the Central Asian Turkic language and is devoted to the description of diseases, their recognition and treatment. One of the manuscript lists is kept in the library in Budapest.

During the reign of Subhan Quli Khan, madrasahs were built in Bukhara and Balkh, and the Dor-ush-Shifo hospital in Bukhara.

Subhan Quli Khan died in 1702 and was buried in Bukhara.

The thinker Ahmad Donish (1827–1897) proposed dividing the history of Central Asia into eras on the basis of the rule of the most prominent rulers, the so-called renovators of the century, among whom he included Subhan Quli Khan.

== Sources ==
- Burton Audrey. The Bukharans. A dynastic, diplomatic and commercial history 1550−1702. — Curzon, 1997
- Robert D. McChesney. Central Asia vi. In the 16th-18th Centuries // Encyclopædia Iranica — Vol. V, Fasc. 2, pp. 176−193
- R. D. McChesney, Waqf in Central Asia: Four Hundred Years in the History of a Muslim Shrine, 1480–1889. Princeton university press, 1991
