= Sherdar Madrasa =

Religious educational institution in Samarkand, Uzbekistan

- Sherdor madrasasi
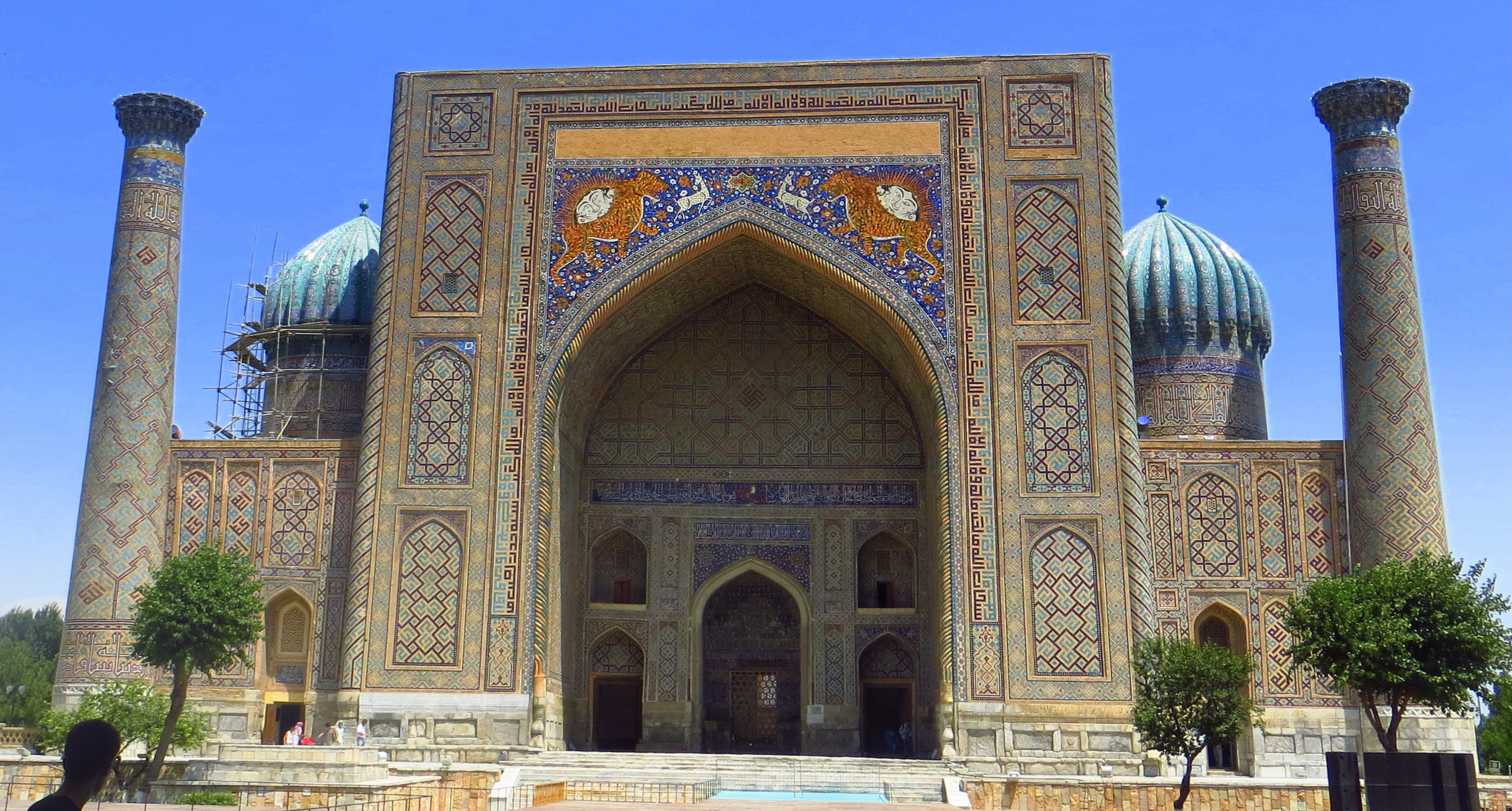
- Interactive map of the Sherdar Madrasa area

General information
- Type: Madrasa
- Location: Samarkand, Uzbekistan
- Coordinates: 39°39′18″N 66°58′35″E
- Inaugurated: 1619–1636
- ^{Part of the World Heritage site "Samarkand – Crossroad of Cultures"}

The Sherdar Madrasa (Note: Also called the Sherdar college; also written Sher Dar; alternatively Shirdar, Shir-Dar, Shir Dar via modern Iranian Persian; Sherdor, Sher-Dor, Sher Dor via Uzbek.) (from Classical Persian: مدرسۀ شیردار, romanized: Madrasa-yi Šērdār, lit. 'the Lion-Bearing Madrasa'; Uzbek: Sherdor madrasasi) is a 17th-century madrasa (Islamic school) located on the Registan in the historic center of Samarkand, a UNESCO World Heritage Site in Uzbekistan. The madrasa's name references the distinctive tiger-lion mosaics on its façade.

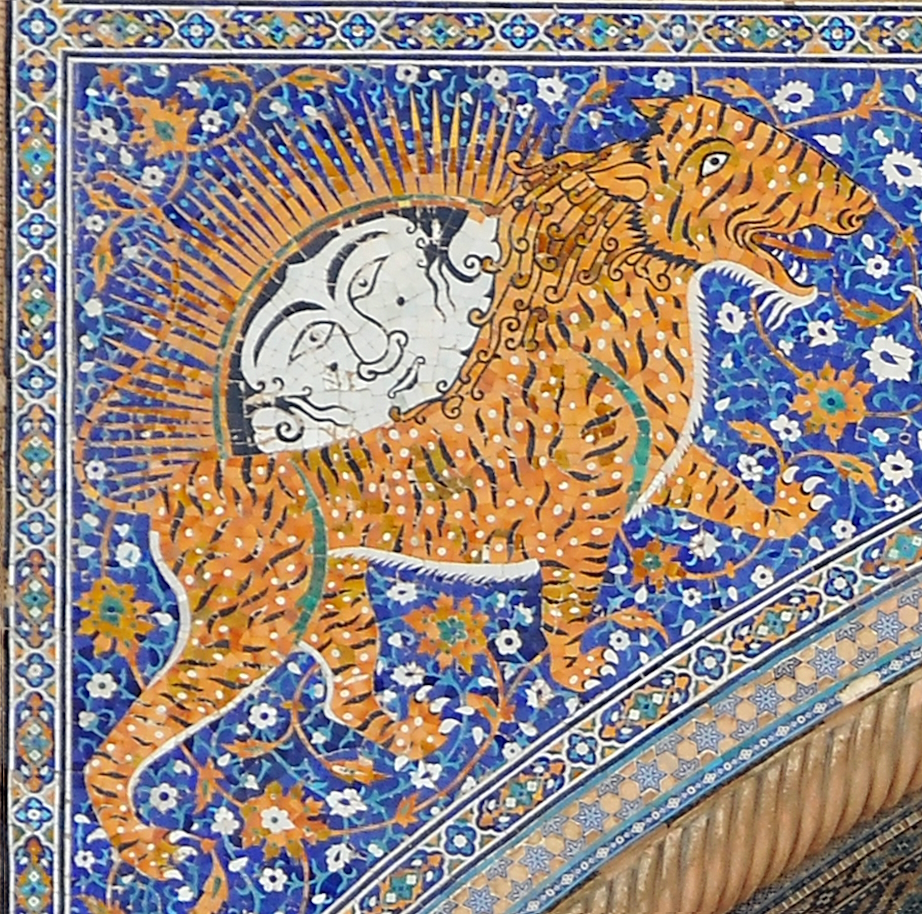
Lion and Sun on the façade of the Sherdar Madrasa (1028 AH / 1627 CE)

The Sherdar Madrasa was built by Yalangtush Bahadur, an Uzbek ruler and governor of Samarkand under the Ashtarkhanid (Janid) dynasty in the 17th century. The madrasa was constructed between 1619 and 1636.

Together with the Ulugh Beg and Tilakari madrasas, it forms the monumental ensemble of the Registan, the ancient heart of the city. The building is considered one of the main tourist attractions in Samarkand and is known for its profuse tile decoration and polychrome plant-themed paintings.

== Sources ==
- Cezar, Mustafs (1983). Typical Commercial Buildings of the Ottoman Classical Period and the Ottoman Construction System.
- Dani, Ahmad Hasan (1993). New Light on Central Asia.
- Issiyeva, Adalyat (2021). Representing Russia's Orient: From Ethnography to Art Song.
- Jarring, Gunnar (1938). Uzbek Texts from Afghan Turkestan.
- Khalid, Adeeb (1999). The Politics of Muslim Cultural Reform: Jadidism in Central Asia.
- Khanikoff (1845). Bokhara: Its Amir and its People. Translated by Clement A. de Bode. London.
- Lansdell, Henry (1887). Through Central Asia with a Map and Appendix on the Diplomacy and Delimitation of the Russo-Afghan Frontier. London.
- Levi, Scott Cameron (2000). The Indian Diaspora in Central Asia and Its Trade.
- Parodi, Laura (2014). The Visual World of Muslim India: The Art, Culture and Society of the Deccan in the Early Modern Era. I.B. Tauris.
- Shafi, Mohammad (2007). Central Asia: Economy, Environment and Culture.
- Shahbazi, Alireza Shapur (1999). "FLAGS i. Of Persia". Encyclopædia Iranica.
- Spahic, Omer (2019). History and Theory of Islamic Architecture.
