= Abd al-Aziz Khan (Bukhara) =

Khan of Bukhara from 1645 to 1681

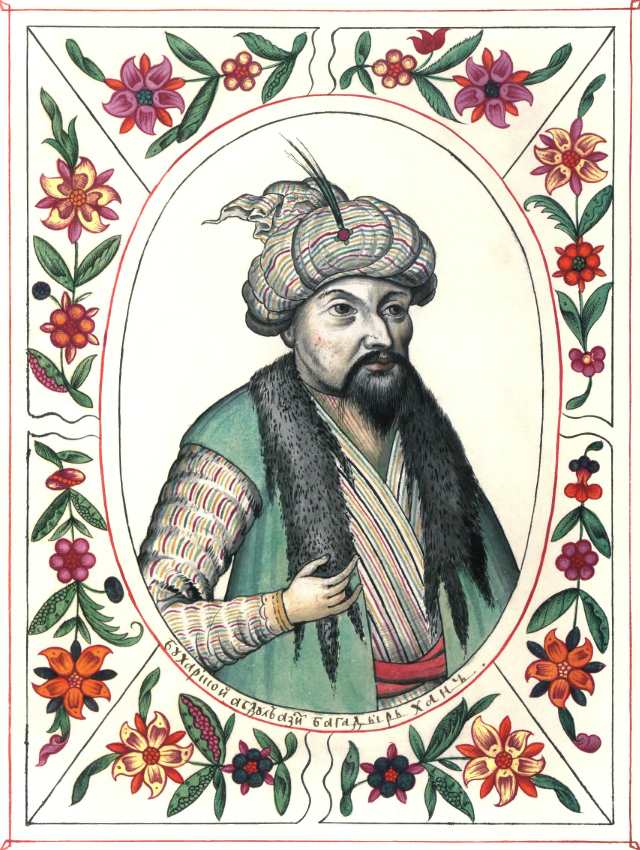
- Abd al-Aziz Khan of Bukhara (1672)

Khan of the Bukhara Khanate
- Reign: 1645 – 1680
- Predecessor: Nadr Muhammad Khan
- Successor: Subhan Quli Khan
- Died: 1683; Mecca
- House: Borjigin
- Dynasty: Janids
- Father: Nadr Muhammad Khan
- Religion: Sunni Islam

Abd al-Aziz Khan (Chagatai and Persian: عبدالعزیز خان; 1614–1683) was the fifth Khan of Bukhara from the Uzbek Ashtarkhanid dynasty, who ruled between 1645 and 1681.

== Early life ==
He was a son of the Nadr Muhammad Khan, the fourth Khan of Bukhara and thus a descendant of Jochi.

== Reign ==
In 1645, the Begs and feudal lords, dissatisfied with Nadr Muhammed's policy, proclaimed Abd al-Aziz Khan as the Khan of Bukhara.

=== Mughal Invasion ===
To retake his throne, Nadr Mohammad asked for help from the Mughal Emperor Shah Jahan, who took advantage of this opportunity and marched his army to Balkh. Shah Jahan launched an invasion of Central Asia from 1646 to 1647 against the Khanate of Bukhara. With a total army of 75,000, Shah Jahan and his sons Aurangzeb and Murad Bakhsh temporarily occupied the territories of Balkh and Badakhshan. In 1647, Abd al-Aziz attacked the Mughal troops in Balkh, and after heavy fighting, eliminated the foreign invaders and appointed his brother Subhan Quli Khan as the governor of Balkh.

=== Civil war and Khiva's invasion ===
Soon the two brothers started fighting each other for the throne. The Khan of Khiva, Abu al-Ghazi Bahadur and his son Anusha Khan took advantage of such conditions and attacked Bukhara, but in 1657, Abd al-Aziz Khan defeated the Khan of Khiva.

=== Abdication and death ===
The long war with Khiva stained the reputation of Abd al-Aziz Khan and he was forced to hand over the throne to his brother Subhan Quli Khan in 1680. Abdul Aziz Khan died in 1683 while performing the Hajj in Mecca.

== Legacy ==
During the reign of Abd al-Aziz Khan, a madrasa named after him was built in Bukhara as was the Tilakari Madrasa in Samarkand.

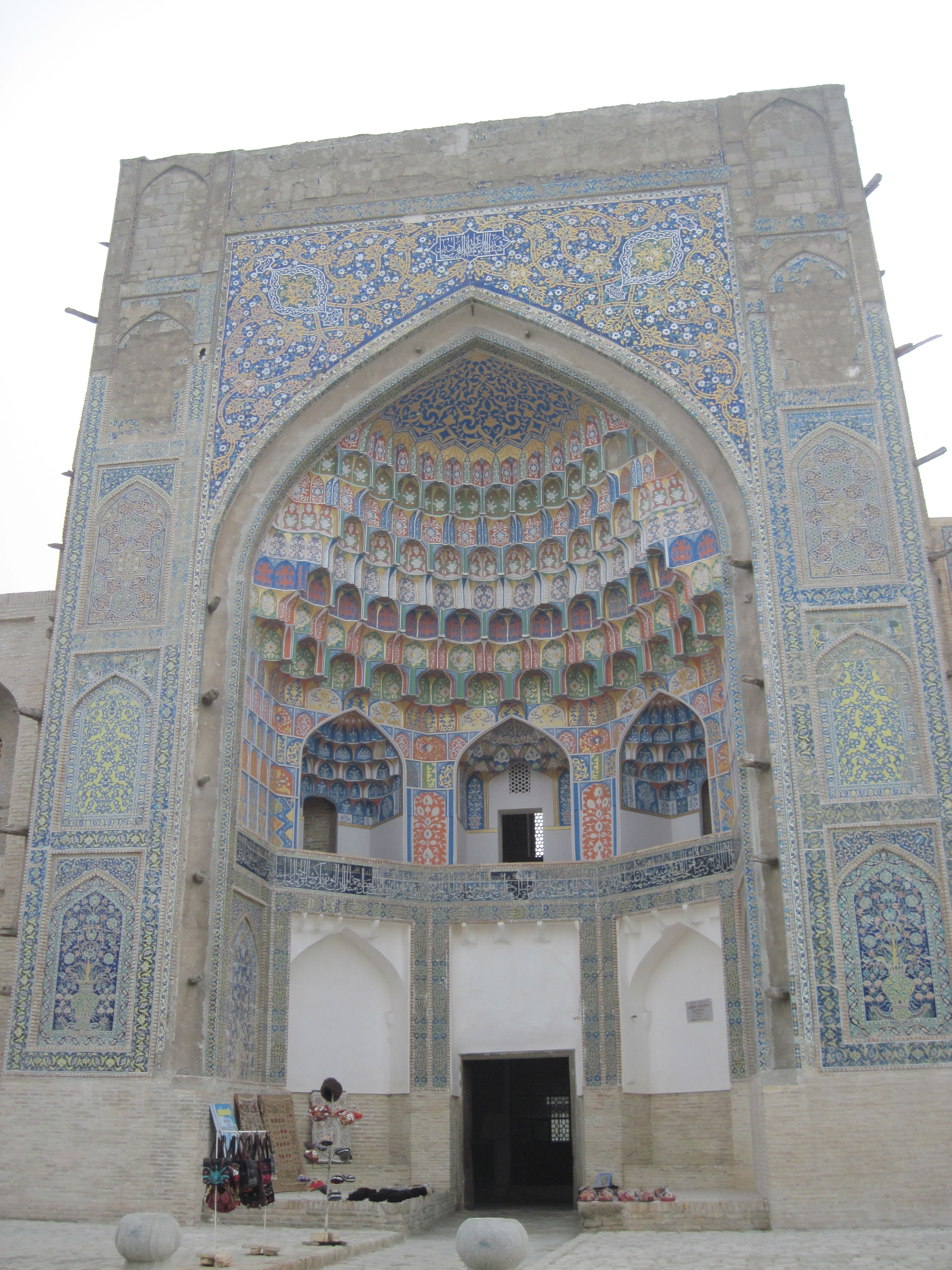
Abd al-Aziz Khan Madrasa in Bukhara (17th century)

He was described as a "brave, generous, science-loving Khan". He collected a library of copies of beautiful manuscripts.

=== Diplomatic relations ===
During the reign of Abd al-Aziz Khan, the diplomatic and commercial relations of the Khanate of Bukhara with Russian Empire, Safavid Iran and Mughal Empire flourished. In 1669, he sent an embassy headed by Mullah Farrukh to Russia to Tsar Alexis of Russia. In response, in 1670, a Russian embassy headed by the Pazukhin brothers was sent to Bukhara.

== Sources ==
- Howorth, Henry Hoyle. History of the Mongols, from the 9th to the 19th Century. Part II division II. The so-called tartars of Russia and Central Asia. London: Longmans, Green and Co, 1880.
