= Baqi Muhammad Khan =

Leader of the Khanate of Bukhara from 1599 to 1605

Bāqī Muḥammad Khān (Chagatai and Persian: باقی محمد خان) was the son of Jani Muhammad/Jani Bek and a leader of the Ashtarkhanid (Toqay-Timurid, Janid) dynasty in the Khanate of Bukhara from 1599–1605 AD.

After Jani-Muhammad was elected Khan in 1599, Baqi Muhammad was the de facto ruler of the Bukhara Khanate.

In the winter of 1601-02, Baqi Muhammad also faced the uprising of Abbas and Rahman Quli. In the struggle for Badakhshan at the end of March 1603, Baqi Muhammad won. When Jani Mohammad died, Baqi Muhammad was declared khan.

Baqi Muhammad ascended the throne with the title of khan on November 17, 1603. He made Bukhara his capital, but he spent more time in Samarkand.

Baqi Muhammad Khan died in 1605.

During his short reign, he established the legitimacy of the Toqay-Timurids in Transoxiana and Balkh, strengthened the system of appanage possessions, and repulsed two external attacks on his state. Baqi Muhammad Khan was engaged in great charitable activities. He built several mosques and madrasahs in Bukhara, a mosque (id-gāh), a park and audience hall (kurinish-hona) in Samarkand.

== Sources ==
- Burton Audrey. The Bukharans. A dynastic, diplomatic and commercial history 1550−1702. — Curzon, 1997
- Robert D. McChesney. Central Asia vi. In the 16th-18th Centuries // Encyclopædia Iranica — Vol. V, Fasc. 2, pp. 176−193
- R. D. McChesney, Waqf in Central Asia: Four Hundred Years in the History of a Muslim Shrine, 1480—1889. Princeton university press, 1991
