= Khanate of Bukhara =

1501–1756 Uzbek state in Central Asia

- 1501–1785
- The Khanate of Bukhara c. 1596
- Capital: None (1501–1562); Bukhara (from 1562); 39°46′N 64°26′E
- Common languages: Persian (official, court, literature); Chagatai Turkic
- Religion: Islam (Sunni, Naqshbandi Sufism)
- Demonym: Bukharan
- Government: Khanate
- Khan
  - 1501–1510: Muhammad Shaybani
  - 1583–1598: Abdullah Khan
  - 1599–1605: Baqi Muhammad Khan
  - 1606–1611: Vali Muhammad Khan
  - 1611–1642: Imam Quli Khan
  - 1642–1645: Nadr Muhammad Khan
  - 1747–1753: Muhammad Rahim (usurper)
  - 1758–1785: Abu'l-Ghazi Khan
- Ataliq
- Historical era: Early modern period
  - Muhammad Shaybani conquers Bukhara from Timurid Empire: 1501
  - Establishment of Janid dynasty: 1599
  - Khanate is conquered by Nader Shah after Mohammad Hakim surrenders: 1740
  - Manghit dynasty takes control after Nader Shah dies and his empire breaks up: 1747
  - Establishment of Emirate of Bukhara: 1785

Population
  - 1902: 2,000,000 est.
Preceded by
Timurid Empire
Uzbek Khanate
Succeeded by
Emirate of Bukhara
Khanate of Kokand
Durrani Empire

The Khanate of Bukhara was an Uzbek monarchy in Central Asia from 1501 to 1785, founded by the Shaybanid dynasty, a branch of the Abu'l-Khayrids. Muhammad Shaybani, grandson of the steppe ruler Abu'l-Khayr Khan, conquered the major cities of Mawarannahr (Transoxiana) – Balkh, Bukhara, Samarkand, and Tashkent – and established his rule in the region. In its earliest years, the Khanate was alternately governed from each of these cities before Abdullah Khan II (r. 1557–1598) established Bukhara as its permanent capital by 1562.

In the 17th and 18th centuries, the Khanate was ruled by the Janid dynasty (also referred to as Ashtarkhanids or Toqay Timurids). They were the last Chinggisid dynasty to rule Bukhara. In 1740, it was conquered by Nader Shah, the Shah of Iran. After his death in 1747, the Khanate was controlled by the non-Chingissid descendants of the Uzbek emir Khudayar Bi, through the prime ministerial position of ataliq. In 1785, his descendant, Shah Murad, formalized the family's dynastic rule (Manghit dynasty), and the Khanate became the Emirate of Bukhara. The Manghits were non-Chingissid and took the Islamic title of emir instead of khan since their legitimacy was not based on descent from Genghis Khan.

== History ==
=== Shaybanid dynasty (1501–1598) ===
==== Rise of Muhammad Shaybani ====
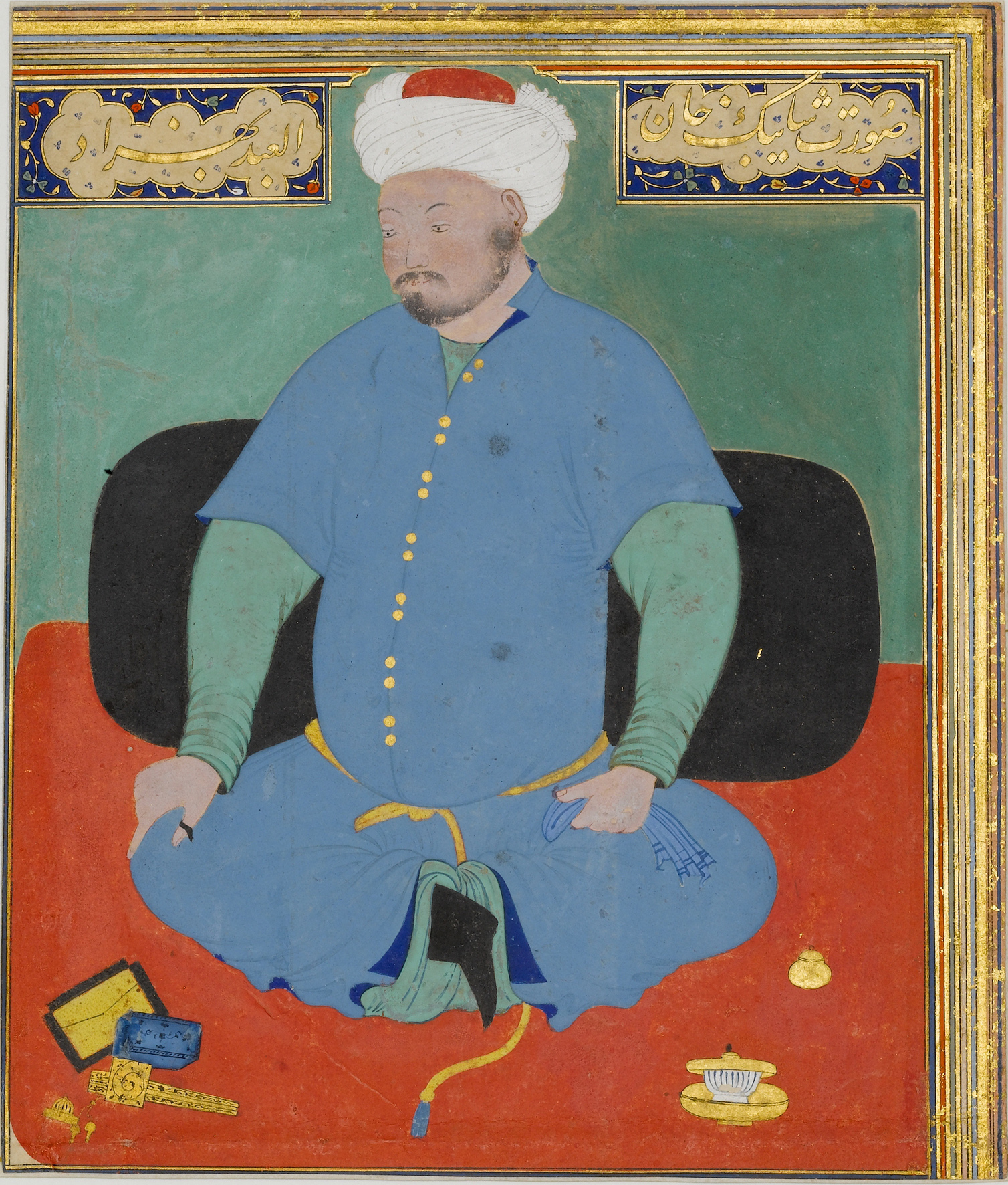
Contemporary portrait of Muhammad Shaybani, c. 1507

The first dynasty to rule the khanate was the Shaybanid dynasty, which reigned from 1501 until 1598. They were a branch of the Abu'l-Khayrid dynasty and claimed descent from Genghis Khan through his son Jochi. The ancestor of the ruling Abu'l-Khayrids, Abu'l-Khayr Khan, established an empire that by the time of his death in 1469 stretched from Siberia to the Syr Darya river. He controlled the cities of Sighnaq, Suzaq, Arquq, Uzgend, and Yassi along the Syr Darya. However, the Uzbek tribes remained nomadic, living a life on the steppe, and Abu'l-Khayr Khan had no interest in conquering the lands of Mawarannahr (Transoxiana) or Khorasan. Following his death, his empire broke up into smaller pieces led by sultans and tribal chieftains. One of these units was led by Muhammad Shaybani, Abu'l-Khayr's grandson. He was well-educated, had great military intellect, and desired to conquer the settled lands of Mawarannahr for himself.

In the 1490s, Muhammad Shaybani swept through Central Asia and conquered Samarkand, Bukhara, Tashkent, and Andijan from 1500 to 1503. One of his most formidable enemies was Zahir ud-Din Muhammad Babur, the Timurid prince of Fergana. He managed to briefly occupy Samarkand from Muhammad Shaybani, and attempted on two other occasions to take it. A turning point in the conflict between the two was the Battle of Sar-i Pul in the spring of 1501, which resulted in victory for the Shaybanids. Babur's defeat and subsequent flight to Kabul forced him to turn his ambitions southwards, towards India; he would eventually defeat the forces of the Delhi Sultanate at the Battle of Panipat and found the Mughal Empire.

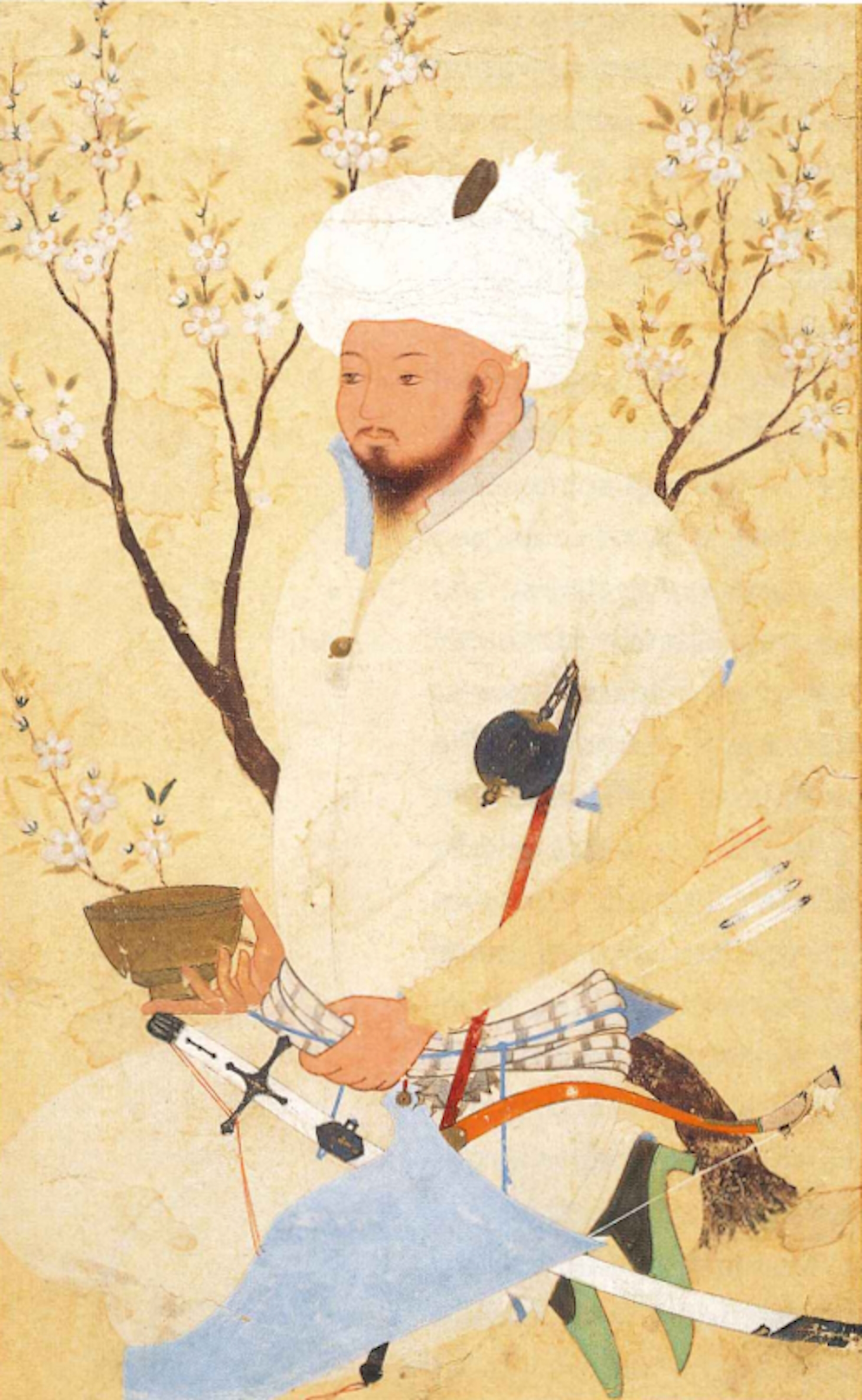
A Bukharan amir. 16th century Bukhara School.

In 1505, Muhammad Shaybani took Urgench after a 10-month siege, resulting in the annexation of Khwarazm. The ruler of Herat, Sultan Husayn Bayqara, attempted to launch a campaign to Transoxiana but it proved to be abortive. When he decided to take the field, he was no longer capable of leading the army. Bayqara died in 1506 and was succeeded by his two sons, Badi' al-Zaman Mirza and Muzaffar Husayn Mirza. Despite their differences, they agreed to jointly field an army against the Uzbeks. They assembled their forces along the Murghab River, allying with Babur to crush Muhammad Shaybani. In 1506 Shaybani captured Balkh, and the allied Timurid force disintegrated on its own. Finally in 1507 he was able to take Herat and the rest of the Timurid lands. By this time he ousted the Timurids from Kunduz, Balkh, Khorasan, Khwarazm, and other regions and incorporated them into his empire.

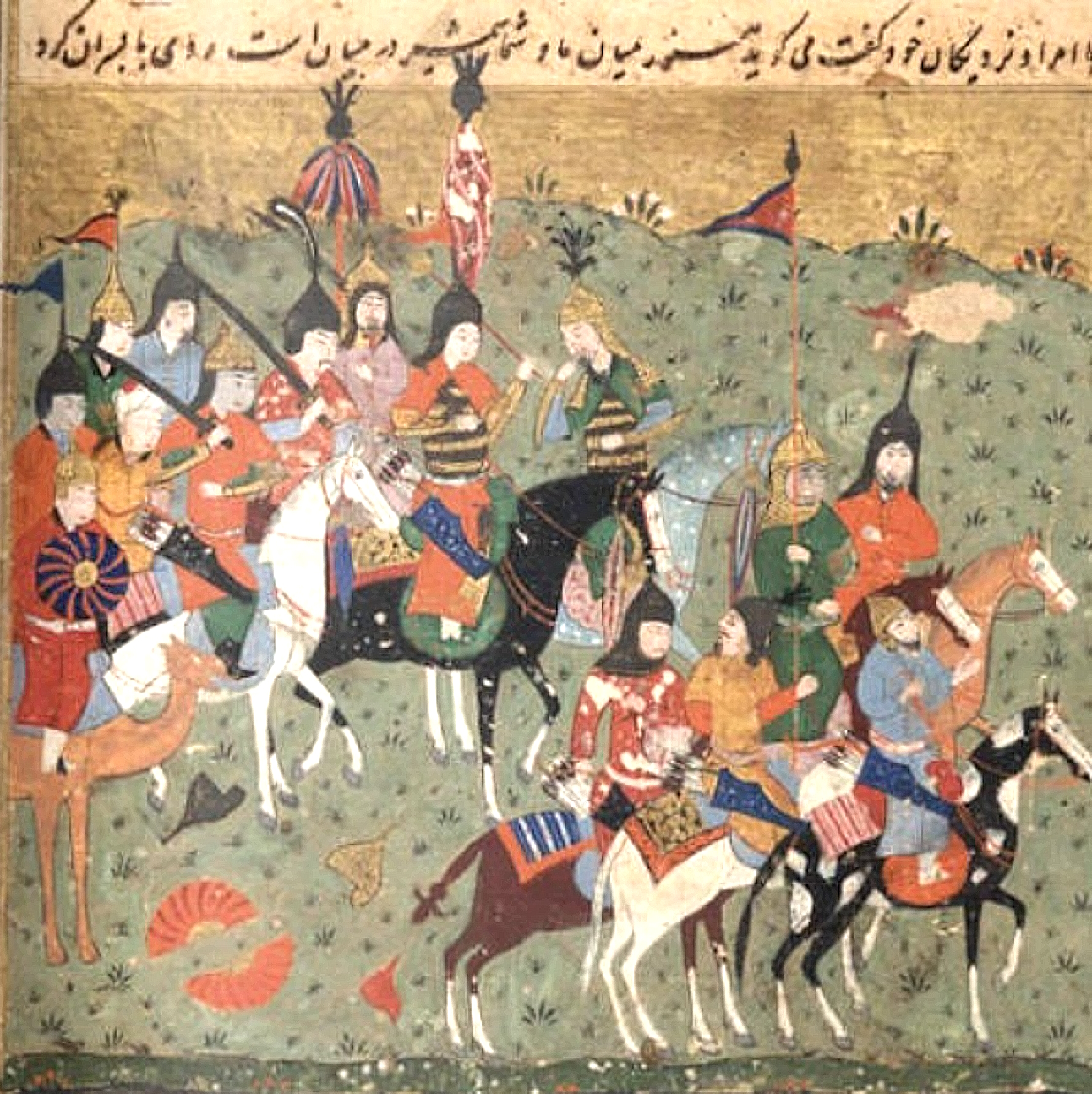
Army in the steppe, ca. 1540, Tashkent.

However Shah Ismail I of the newly founded Safavid Empire, wishing to conquer the Timurid lands for himself and enraged by Shaybani's staunch Sunnism, invaded Khorasan and killed Mohammad Shaybani outside the city of Merv in 1510. Khorasan and Khwarazm were conquered by Iran and Samarqand was briefly lost to Babur in 1512. However, he was unable to establish his presence there for long and soon the Uzbeks were able to reclaim their lost territory. However, Khwarazm permanently became independent, becoming the Khanate of Khiva. It was ruled by the Arabshahids, another branch of the Shibanids. Khwarazm was briefly conquered by Ubaidullah Khan (1533–1539) but shortly after it became independent once again.

After Muhammad Shaybani's death, a kurultai elected Kuchkonji, Shaybani's uncle and Abu'l-Khayr's eighth son, as the new supreme khan. The kurultai also divided the lands conquered by Shaybani into regional appanages and distributed them among different lineages of the Abu'l-Khayrid dynasty. Kuchkonji took Samarkand as his seat of power; Bukhara was given to Ubaydullah, Shaybani's nephew; Miyonkol (the region between Bukhara and Samarkand, around present-day Navoiy) went to Jonibeg, Abu'l-Khayr's grandson through his second son Khoja Muhammad; and Tashkent to Suyunjuk (also known as Sevinch Muhammad), Abu'l-Khayr's ninth son.

=== Janid dynasty (1599–1747) ===
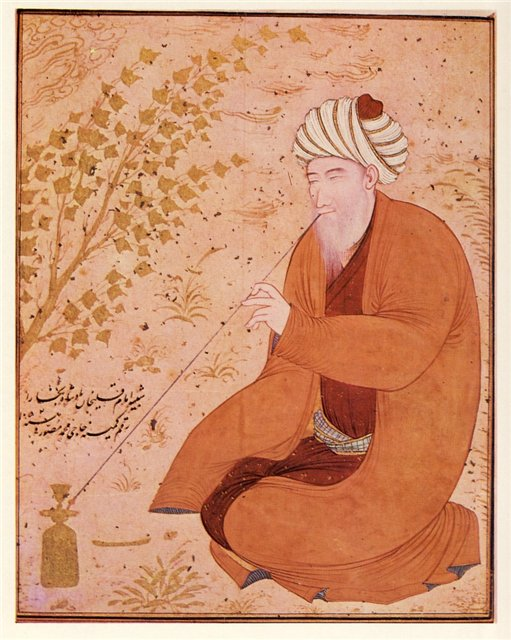
Imam Quli Khan, the ruler of the Bukharan Khanate from 1611 to 1642. Painted during his stay in Safavid Iran by Muhammad Musawwir

The Janid dynasty (Note: Also known as the Tuqay-Timurids.) (descendants of Astrakhanids) ruled the Khanate from 1599 until 1747. Yar Muhammad and his family had escaped from Astrakhan after the city fell to the Russians. He had a son named Jani Muhammad who had two sons named Baqi Muhammad and Vali Muhammad Khan from his wife, who was the daughter of the last Shaybanid ruler.

The son of Din Muhammad Sultan – Baqi Muhammad Khan in 1599 defeated Pir Muhammad Khan II, who had lost his authority. He became the real founder of a new dynasty of Janids or Ashtarkhanids in the Bukhara Khanate (1599–1756). Baqi Muhammad Khan, despite his short reign, carried out administrative, tax and military reforms in the country, which contributed to its further development. He issued coins with the inscription Baqi Muhammad Bahadurkhan and the names of the first four caliphs.

During this period, the Uzbek poet Turdy wrote critical poems and called for the unity of 92 tribal Uzbek people. The most famous Uzbek poet is Mashrab, writing in both Chagatai and Persian, who composed a number of poems in that are still popular today. In the 17th and early 18th centuries, historical works were written in Persian. Among the famous historians, Abdurahman Tole, Muhammad Amin Bukhari, Mutribi should be noted.

In the sources of the second half of the 17th century, the expression "92 Uzbek tribes" is used in relation to the part of the population of the Bukhara Khanate.

After the assassination of Ubaydullah Khan on 18 March 1711, the Bukharan state disintegrated into multiple different principalities. According to Chekhovich, only the districts of Qarakul, Wardanzi, Wabkent, and Ghijduwan were under the new Bukharan khan, Abu'l-Fayz. Other sources report that his authority didn't stretch beyond the Bukharan citadel.

=== Janid decline and Manghit takeover ===
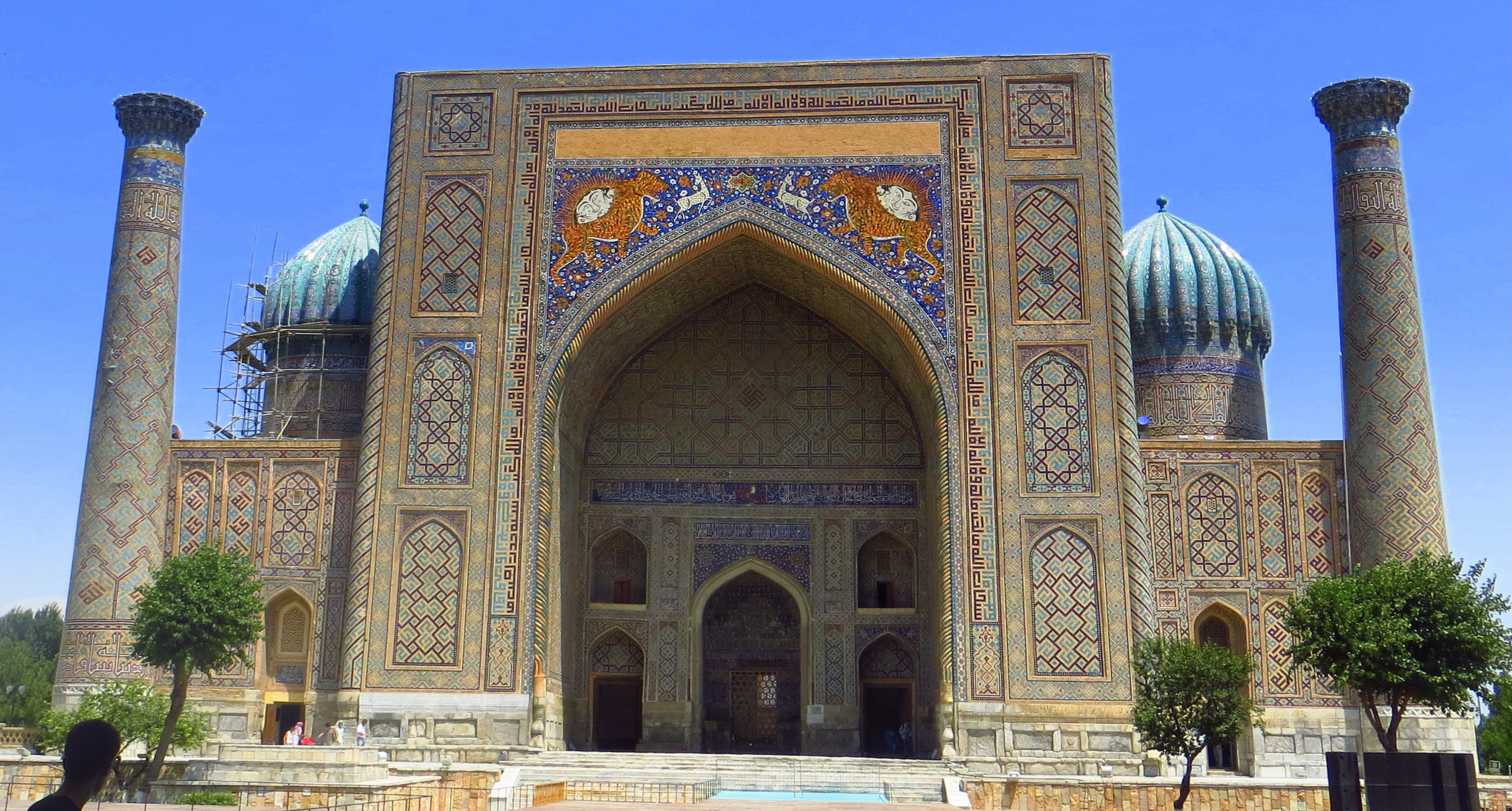
The Sherdar Madrasa, built between 1619 and 1636 by Governor of Samarkand Yalangtoʻsh Bakhodir on the Registan of Samarqand

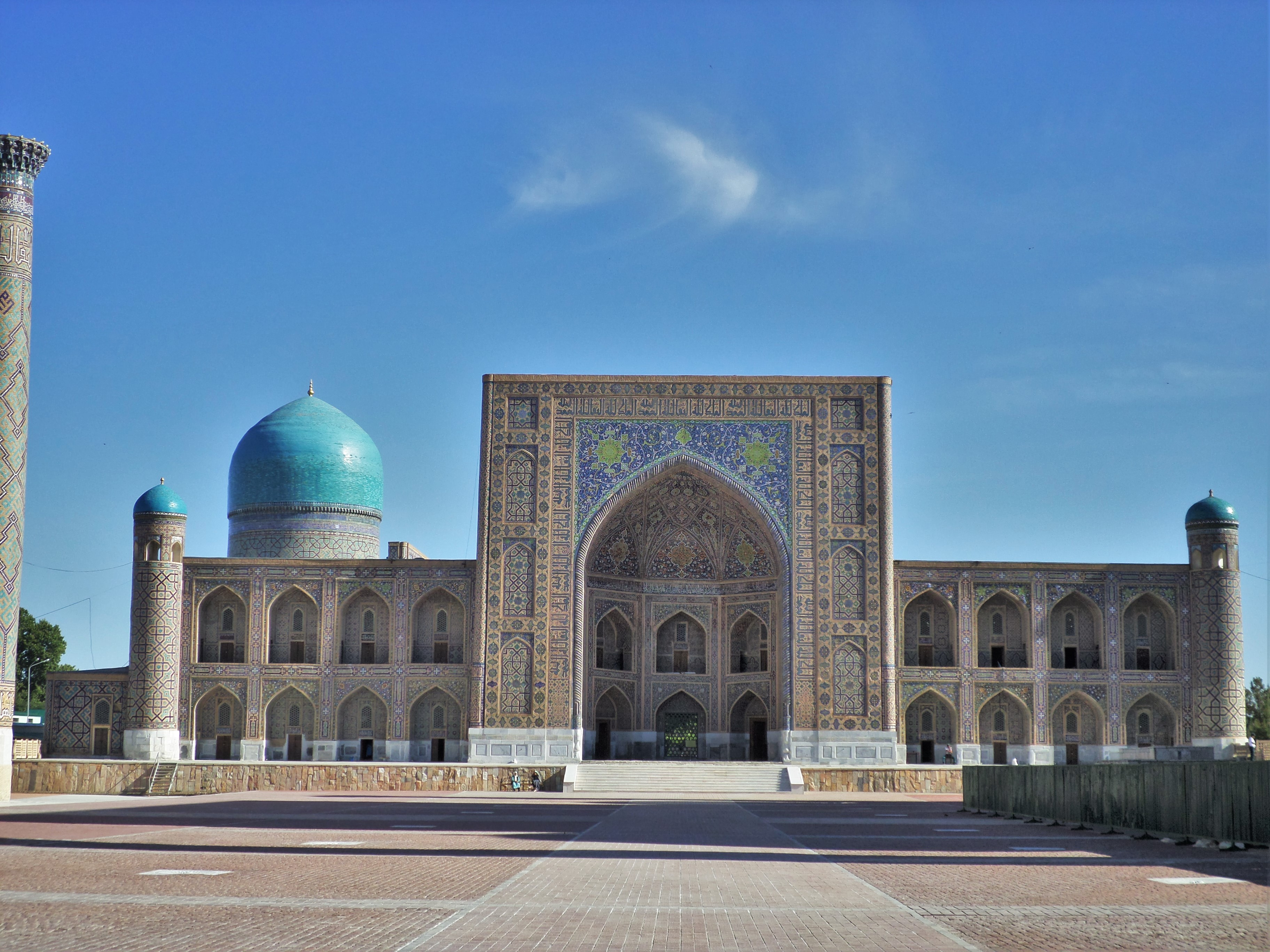
The Tilakari Madrasa, also built by Yalangtoʻsh Bakhodir, between 1646 and 1660 on the Registan of Samarqand

The Ashtarkhanids were replaced by the Uzbek Manghit dynasty, whose members ruled Bukhara until 1920.

The beginning of the strengthening of the political influence of representatives of the Uzbek Manghit aristocracy in the Bukhara Khanate dates back to the beginning of the 17th century. But the real growth of their power occurred after the appointment in 1712 of Khudayar-biy Manghit to the post of ataliq. His son Muhammad Hakim-biy took the post of divanbegi at the court of Abulfayz Khan. In 1715–1716, Khudayar-biy was removed from his post at the initiative of Ibrahim-parvanachi from the Uzbek family of keneges. In 1719–1720, after the flight of Ibrahim-bey from Bukhara, Khudayar-bey, who was in Balkh, was allowed to return to power, giving him the inheritance of Karshi, which was the result of the policy of his son Muhammad Hakim-bey. In 1721, Muhammad Hakim-biy was appointed ataliq.

During the campaign of the Afsharid ruler of Persia Nadir Shah to Transoxiana in 1740, Muhammad Hakim-biy went to peace negotiations with him, thus saving the country from war and strengthening his power. He had five sons: Muhammad Badal-biy, Kurban-mirahur (died in 1733), Muhammad Rahim, Yav Kashti-biy, Barat-sultan. His third son, Muhammad Rahim, joined Nadir Shah and participated in his further campaigns.

Since 1740, the actual power in the Bukhara Khanate was in the hands of the last ataliqs from the Uzbek clan Manghit, Muhammad Hakim-biy (1740–1743), Muhammad Rakhim (1745–1753) and Daniyal-biy (1758–1785). The Bukhara khans turned out to be completely dependent on them.

In 1747, after the assassination of Abulfayz Khan, the actual power was completely in the hands of Muhammad Rahim. Until 1756, the nominal rulers were the Ashtarkhanid babies Abdulmumin Khan (1747–1751), Ubaydallah Khan III (1751–1754) and Abulgazi Khan (1754–1756). Muhammad Rahim himself married the daughter of Abulfayz Khan. Under Mohammad Rahim Bi, the Bukhara Khanate was able to expand to the regions of Hissar, Samarqand, Urgut, the Zarafshan Valley, Kulab, Jizzakh, and Ura Tepe. Within three years he was also able to subdue Zamin, Panjkent, and Falgar. Although Muhammad Rakhim Khan was not a descendant of Genghis Khan, through tough politics and good organization, he was able to achieve recognition of his power, ascend the throne and even take the title of Khan.

Rahim Bi had to suppress the power of the local chieftains. He attacked Turghai Murad Burqut, ruler of Nurota and the Miyankal province between Samarqand and Bukhara. The latter was forced to accept Bukharan sovereignty. In 1753 Rahim Bi attacked Urgut and subjugated Shahr-i Sabz, Hissar, and Kulab. In 1754 he successfully incorporated Khujand, Tashkent, and Turkestan into the khanate. In November 1762, Bukharan armies conquered the town of Charjuy and subdued the Turkmen.

== Government ==
Administration of the khanate was decentralized through a system of appanage. The major appanages, divided by a kurultai after Muhammad Shaybani's death, were based in Bukhara, Samarkand, Tashkent, and Balkh. Each of these was traditionally held by a different lineage of the Abu'l-Khayrid dynasty. Lesser appanages included Miyonkol (the region between Bukhara and Samarkand, including Jizzakh); Sogd (in northern Tajikistan); Fergana (including Khujand); Ḥeṣār-e Šādmān (present-day Dushanbe and the Vakhsh valley); Shahrisabz (historically known as Kesh); and Badakhshan. The lesser appanages often fell under the influence of the major appanage rulers. Fergana was frequently contested between the rulers of Tashkent and Samarkand; Shahrisabz similarly alternated between Samarkand and Bukhara.

Throughout most of the 16th century, the khanate had no permanent capital due to several factors. Administration during this period was more decentralized, thus making a central capital relatively less important. Additionally, the khanate initially lacked weak institutions to designate a clear heir apparent, which made succession to the position of khan unpredictable. Administration became more centralized during the reign of Abdullah (1581-1598), resulting in Bukhara becoming the permanent capital.

The khan's power depended on his relationship with the appanage holders, as the nobles ruling each appanage controlled revenue collection and military levies within their territories. The relative balance of power between the khan and the appanages was sometimes measured by control over the appointment of the ataliqs, representatives of the khan who supervised administration and military affairs in each appanage. During times of more centralized rule, due to the khan's prestige or his power of persuasion, the ataliqs were appointed by him. Conversely, at times when central authority was weaker, the nobles ruling each appanage appointed their own ataliq.

== Culture ==
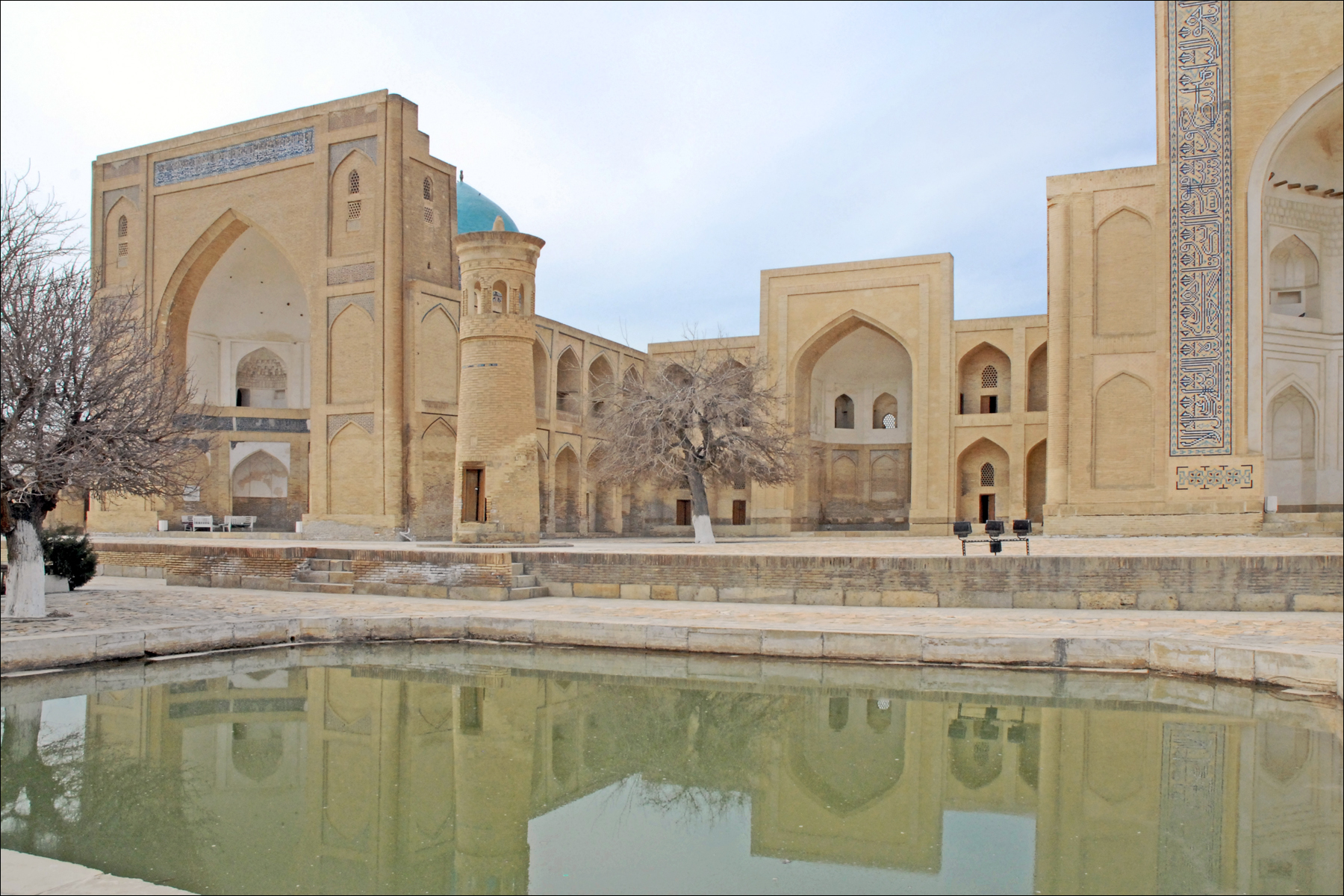
Chor-Bakr memorial complex, built under Muhammad Shaybani c. 1510, Bukhara

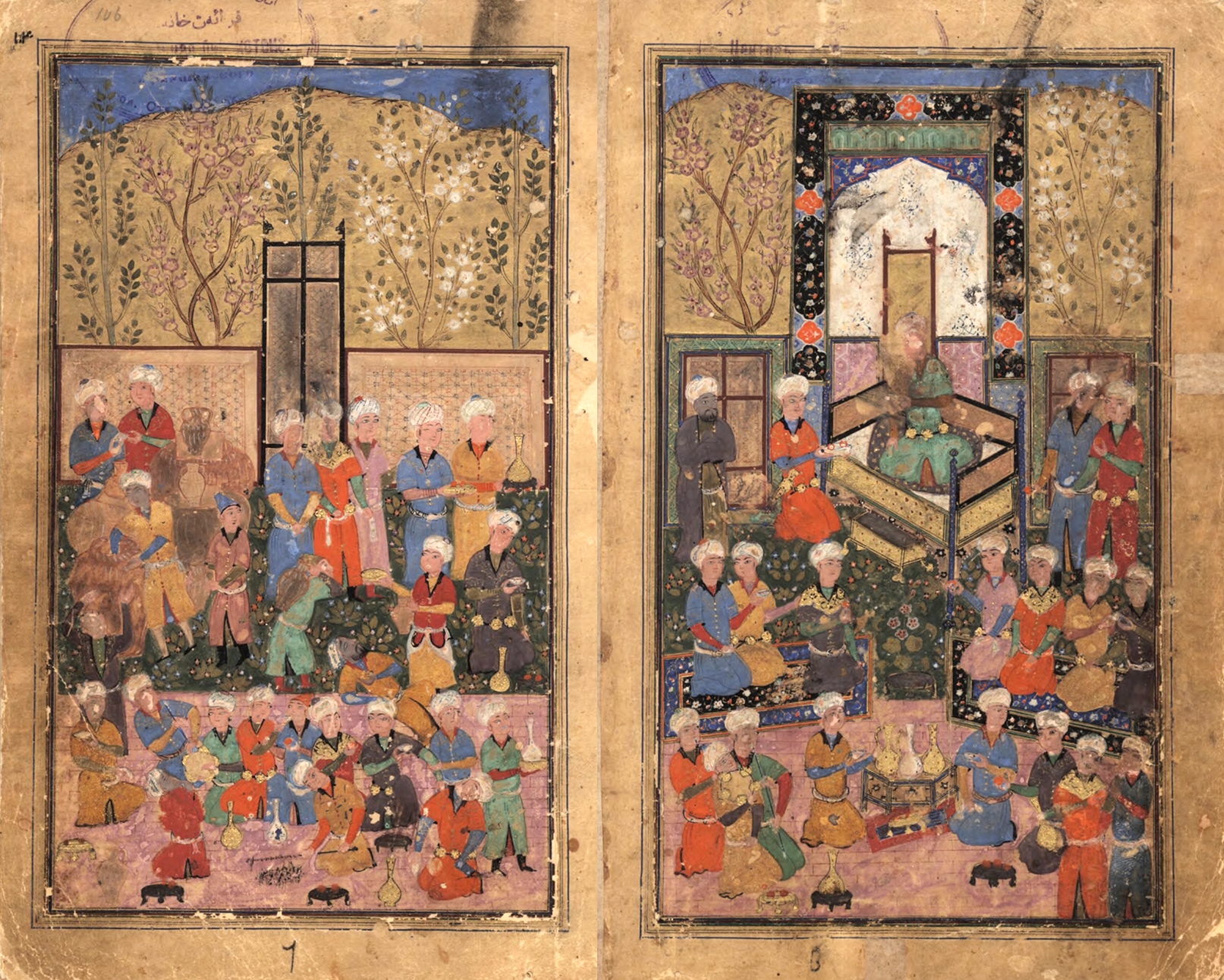
Frontispiece from a Tīmūrnāma of Hatifi, Bukhara kitābkhāna, dated 1568.

Muhammad Shaybani Khan was fond of poetry, and Turkic language collections of his poetry are extant today. There are sources that Muhammad Shibani wrote poetry in both Turkic and Persian. The "Divan" of Muhammad Shibani's poems, written in the Central Asian Turkic literary language, is currently kept in the Topkapi manuscript collection in Istanbul. The manuscript of his philosophical and religious work: "Bahr ul-Khudo", written in the Central Asian Turkic literary language in 1508, is located in London. Muhammad Shaybani wrote poetry under the pseudonym Shibani. He wrote a prose work, Risale-yi maarif-i Shibani. It was written in the Turkic-Chagatai language in 1507 shortly after his capture of Khorasan and is dedicated to his son, Muhammad Timur-Sultan. The manuscript is kept in Istanbul. Turkish historiography increased in the early 16th century, though their production were relatively few. Muhammad Shibani's reign influenced Chagatai's Turkish historical work, The Shibani-nama, while the Tawarikh-i Guzida-yi Nusrat-nama was sponsored by the Khan himself. The Khan also inspired two Persian histories by Bina'i and Shadi, while patronizing the translations of six works from Persian into Chaghatai.

Ubaydullah Khan, nephew of Muhammad Shaybani, was highly educated. He skillfully recited the Koran and provided it with comments in the Turkic language, and he was considered a gifted singer and musician. The formation of the most significant court literary circle in Maverannahr in the first half of the 16th century is associated with Ubaydullah Khan. He wrote poetry in Turkic, Persian and Arabic under the literary pseudonym Ubaydiy. A collection of his poems has survived.

In the Abu'l-Khayrid era in the Bukhara Khanate, Agha-i Buzurg was a famous scholarly Sufi woman. Also known as Great Lady as well as Mastura Khatun, she died c. 1522–23.

Abd al-Aziz Khan (1540–1550) established a library "having no equal" the world over. The prominent scholar Sultan Mirak Munshi worked there from 1540. The gifted calligrapher Mir Abid Khusaini produced masterpieces of Nastaliq and Rayhani script. He was a brilliant miniature-painter, master of encrustation, and was the librarian (kitabdar) of Bukhara's library.

== List of rulers ==
=== Shaybanids ===
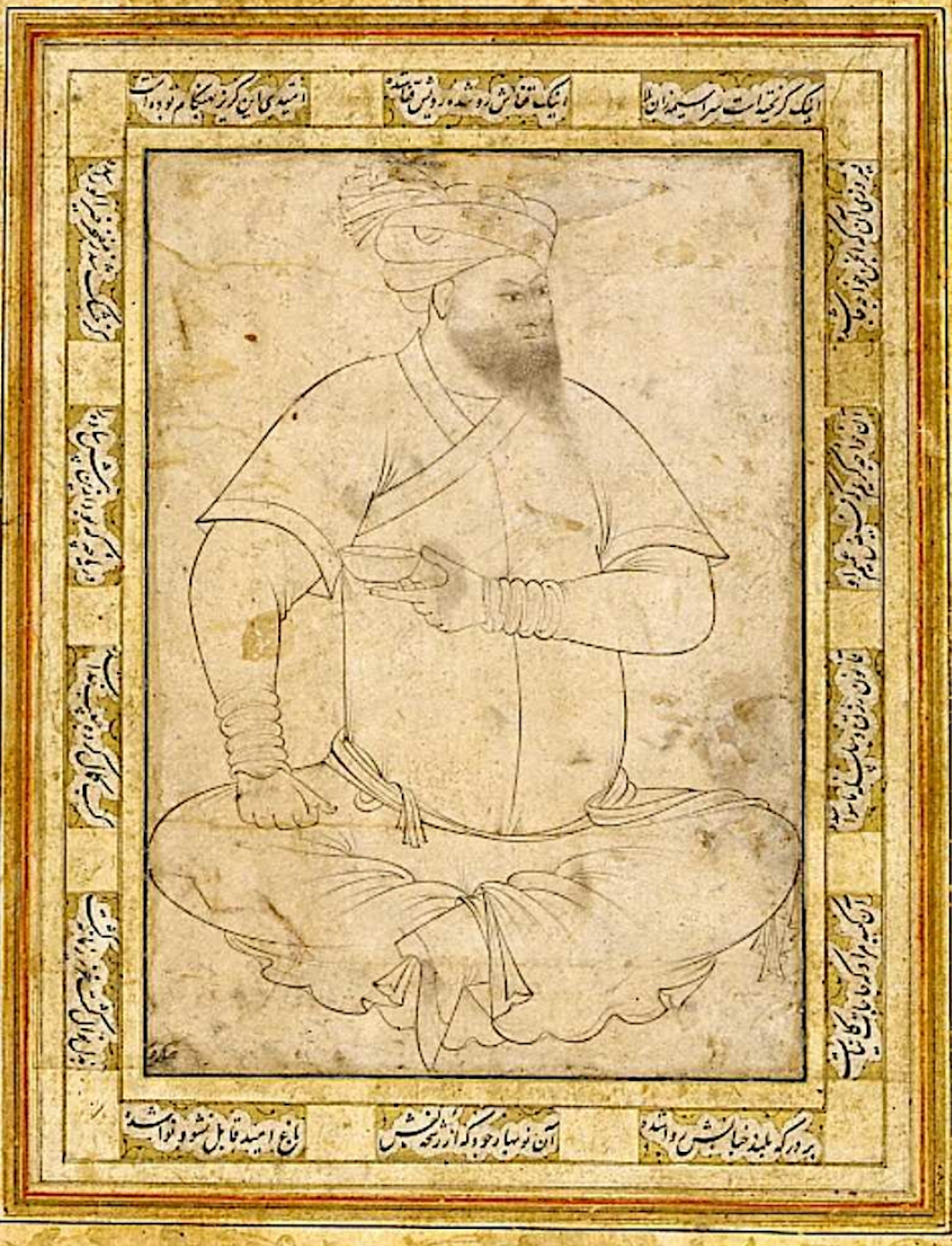
Nawruz Ahmad (Baraq Khan) (1552–1556).

- Shah Bakht Muhammad Shaybani ibn Shah Budaq ibn Abu'l-Khayr Khan (1501–1510)
- Suyunchuk Khwaja ibn Abu'l-Khayr Khan (1511–1512) ruler in Tashkent during Safavid occupation
- Kuchkunchi Muhammad ibn Abu'l-Khayr Khan (1512–1530)
- Abu Sa'id Khan ibn Kuchkunchi Muhammad (1530–1533)
- Ubaydallah ibn Mahmud Shah ibn Shah Budaq ibn Abu'l-Khayr Khan (1533–1540)
- Abdullah I ibn Kuchkunchi Muhammad (1540)
- Abdul-Latif ibn Kuchkunchi Muhammad (1540–1552)
- Nawruz Ahmad (Baraq) ibn Suyunchuk Khwaja (1552–1556)
- Pir Muhammad I ibn Jani Beg ibn Khwaja Muhammad ibn Abu'l-Khayr Khan (1556–1561)
- Iskandar ibn Jani Beg (1561–1583)
- Abdullah II ibn Iskandar (1583–1598); de facto ruled since 1561
- Abdul-Mu'min ibn Abdullah (1598)
- Pir Muhammad II ibn Sulayman ibn Jani Beg (1598–1599)

=== Janids ===
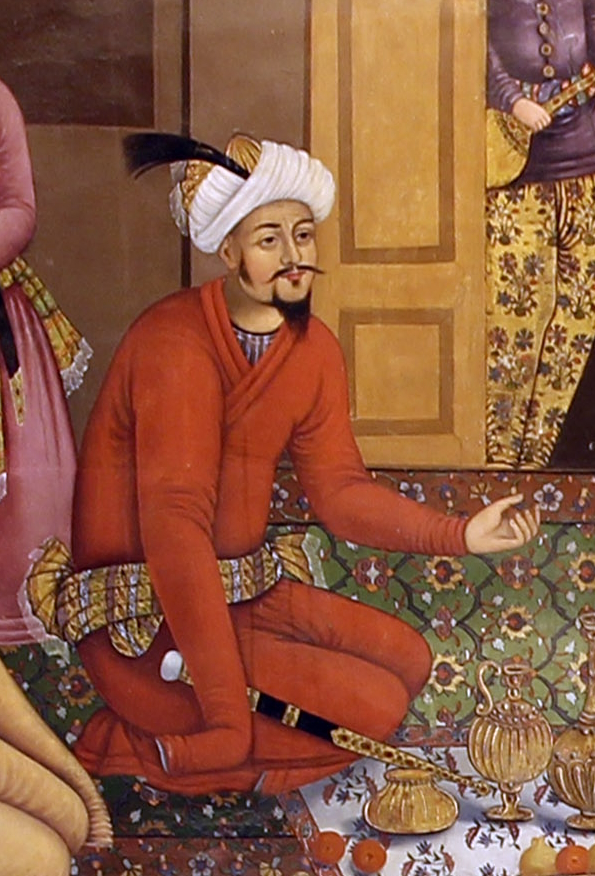
Vali Muhammad Khan as depicted in the Chehel Sotoun in Isfahan, Iran. Circa 1650 painting

- Yar Muhammad Khan (1599–1600) abdicated, died c. 1612; son-in-law of Iskandar ibn Jani Beg ("Iskandar Khan"); descended from Küchük Muhammad Khan of the Golden Horde
- Jani Muhammad Khan (1600–1603)
- Baqi Muhammad Khan (1600–1606) de facto ruled since 1599; abdicated
- Vali Muhammad Khan (1606–1611) deposed
- Imam Quli Khan (1611) deposed
- Vali Muhammad Khan (1611) restored
- Imam Quli Khan (1611–1641) restored, abdicated, died 1642
- Nadr Muhammad Khan (1642–1645) deposed, died 1651
- Abd al-Aziz Khan (1645–1681) abdicated, died 1684
- Subhan Quli Khan (1681–1702)
- Muhammad Ubaidullah Khan (1702 – 18 March 1711)
- Abu al-Fayz Khan (1711–1747)
- Muhammad Abd al-Mumin (1747–1750)
- Muhammad Ubaidullah II (1750–1753) adopted into family, nominal monarch

=== Manghits ===
- Muhammad Rahim (usurper), atalik (1753–1756), khan (1756–1758)
- Shir Ghazi (1758–?)
- Abu'l-Ghazi Khan (1758–1785)

== See also ==
- Khanate of Khiva
- List of Sunni Muslim dynasties
- Russian conquest of Central Asia

== Sources ==
- Adle, C.; Habib, I.; Baipakov, Karl M., eds. (2003). History of Civilizations of Central Asia. Vol. 5. UNESCO.
- Burton, Audrey (1997). The Bukharans: A Dynastic, Diplomatic and Commercial History, 1550–1702. Richmond, Eng.: Curzon. ISBN 9780700704170.
- Green, Nile (2019). The Persianate World: The Frontiers of a Eurasian Lingua Franca. University of California Press.
- Soucek, Svat (2000). A History of Inner Asia. Cambridge University Press.
