= Chekre =

Khan of the Golden Horde from 1414 to 1416

Khan of the Golden Horde
- Reign: 1414–1416
- Predecessor: Jabbār Berdi
- Successor: Jabbār Berdi
- Dynasty: Borjigin
- Father: Āqmīl

Chekre (Turki/Kypchak and Persian: چکره) was Khan of the Golden Horde from 1414 to 1416. His name is found in several renditions, including Chinggis Oghlan (چنگیز اغلان) and possibly Berke. Information on his life and reign is very limited.

== Ancestry ==
According to the Tawārīḫ-i guzīdah-i nuṣrat-nāmah, Chekre was the son of Āqmīl, the son of Mīnkāsar, the son of Abāy, the son of Uz-Tīmūr (Kay-Tīmūr), the son of Tuqa-Timur, the son of Jochi, the son of Chinggis Khan. He was probably a nephew of Mamai's khan ʿAbdallāh.

== Reign ==
Chekre is first mentioned as a Jochid prince living in exile at the court of Timur (Tamerlane) in 1404. He subsequently stayed with Timur's grandson Abū-Bakr b. Mīrān Shāh, where he was witnessed by the Bavarian captive Johann Schiltberger. Losing his control over the court of the Golden Horde, the beglerbeg Edigu apparently looked for a candidate to set up as puppet khan, and requested Chekre's return from the Timurid court. Abū-Bakr granted this request and allowed Chekre to recruit a unit of cavalry, with which he joined Edigu in Khwarazm in 1412. He then participated in Edigu's campaign in Sibir. Edigu had secured Chekre's friendship, apparently intending to make him his puppet khan, but refrained from doing so while negotiating with the sons of Tokhtamysh, the khans Jalāl ad-Dīn and Karīm Berdi. After the latter was overthrown by his brother Kebek, however, Edigu declared Chekre khan in 1414. Edigu and Chekre defeated Kebek, which allowed Karīm Berdi to briefly recover his throne in 1414, before losing it to another of his brothers, Jabbār Berdi. Meanwhile, Edigu and Chekre had extended their control to Bolghar. They temporarily displaced Jabbār Berdi in 1415, but in 1416 he was able to defeat Chekre, who is not heard from again and is presumed to have perished in the struggle, or to have lost Edigu's support and survived into the 1420s. Edigu's next protégé khan was Darwīsh, probably the son of Chekre's nephew. Unlike Jabbār Berdi, whose reign he had interrupted, Chekre issued coins from several mints, including Bolghar, Orda, Sarai, and (old) Astrakhan.

== Descendants ==
According to the Tawārīḫ-i guzīdah-i nuṣrat-nāmah, Chekre had two sons and a daughter: Bāysunghur, Laʿl, and Tūlūnchak.

== Genealogy ==
- Genghis Khan
- Jochi
- Tuqa-Timur
- Kay Timur
- Abay
- Minkasar
- Aqmil
- Chekre

== See also ==
- List of khans of the Golden Horde

== Bibliography ==
- Bosworth, C. E., The New Islamic Dynasties, New York, 1996.
- Gaev, A. G., "Genealogija i hronologija Džučidov," Numizmatičeskij sbornik 3 (2002) 9-55.
- Howorth, H. H., History of the Mongols from the 9th to the 19th Century. Part II.1. London, 1880.
- Počekaev, R. J., Cari ordynskie: Biografii hanov i pravitelej Zolotoj Ordy. Saint Petersburg, 2010.
- Reva, R., "Borba za vlast' v pervoj polovine XV v.," in Zolotaja Orda v mirovoj istorii, Kazan', 2016: 704–729.
- Sabitov, Ž. M., Genealogija "Tore", Astana, 2008.
- Sagdeeva, R. Z., Serebrjannye monety hanov Zolotoj Ordy, Moscow, 2005.
- Seleznëv, J. V., Èlita Zolotoj Ordy: Naučno-spravočnoe izdanie, Kazan', 2009.
- Tizengauzen, V. G. (trans.), Sbornik materialov otnosjaščihsja k istorii Zolotoj Ordy. Izvlečenija iz persidskih sočinenii, republished as Istorija Kazahstana v persidskih istočnikah. 4. Almaty, 2006.
- Vohidov, Š. H. (trans.), Istorija Kazahstana v persidskih istočnikah. 3. Muʿizz al-ansāb. Almaty, 2006.

Preceded by Jabbār Berdi	Khan of the Golden Horde; 1415–1416	Succeeded by Jabbār Berdi
