= Berdi =

Berdi is a given name and byname (epithet). Notable people with the name include:

== Given name ==
- Berdi Kerbabayev (1894–1974), Soviet and Turkmen writer
- Berdi Şamyradow (born 1982), Turkmen football coach and a former professional player

== Khans of the Golden Horde ==
- Berdi Beg (c. 1310–1359), Khan of the Golden Horde from 1357 to 1359
- Dawlat Berdi (died 1432), also known as Devlet Berdi, Khan of the Golden Horde from 1419 to 1421
- Jabbar Berdi (died 1417), Khan of the Golden Horde from 1414 to 1415 and again from 1416 to 1417
- Karim Berdi (died c. 1417), Khan of the Golden Horde in 1409, 1412–1413, and in 1414
- Qadir Berdi (died 1419), Khan of the Golden Horde in 1419
