= Darwish (Golden Horde) =

Khan of the Golden Horde from 1417 to 1419

Darwīsh

Khan of the Golden Horde
- Reign: 1417–1419
- Predecessor: Jabbār Berdi
- Successor: Qādir Berdi
- Died: 1419
- Issue: Shukr Bīka
- Dynasty: Borjigin
- Father: Altī Qurtuqā

Darwīsh (Turki/Kypchak and Persian: درویش) was Khan of the Golden Horde in 1417–1419, as the protégé of the beglerbeg Edigu. Information on his life and reign is very limited.

== Ancestry ==
According to the Tawārīḫ-i guzīdah-i nuṣrat-nāmah, Darwīsh was a son of Alti Qurtuqa, a descendant of Tuqa-Timur, the son of Jochi, the son of Chinggis Khan. More specifically, the descent is given as Darwīsh, son of Altī-Qurtuqā, the son of Mamkī, the son of Mīnkāsar, the son of Abāy, the son of Kay-Tīmūr (Uz-Tīmūr), the son of Tūqā-Tīmūr, the son of Jūjī. Darwīsh was thus the younger cousin of his predecessor Chekre (the son of Āqmīl, the son of Mīnkāsar). An uncle named Sayyid-Aḥmad is sometimes identified with the ephemeral khan of that name, who claimed the throne in 1416, but that was more likely a son of Karīm Berdi.

== Career ==
After the defeat and probable demise of Edigu's protégé Chekre Khan in battle against the Lithuanian protégé Jabbār Berdi in 1416, Edigu proclaimed khan a certain Sayyid-Aḥmad. According to one account, this khan had no experience in ruling and was deposed or killed in 45 days. Especially if the inexperience was due to youth, Sayyid-Aḥmad may be identified as the son of anti-Lithuanian Karīm Berdi, rather than as Chekre's cousin. Edigu next declared Chekre's younger cousin Darwīsh as khan. During the reign of either Sayyid-Aḥmad or Darwīsh, Edigu succeeded in eliminating Jabbār Berdi in 1417. Coins were now struck in Darwīsh's name at Bolghar, (old) Astrakhan, and Solkhat in the Crimea, indicating his recognition along the Volga and in the southwest of the Golden Horde. The coins minted in the Crimea also featured the name of the beglerbeg Edigu, highlighting his control over the khan's court in a more ostentatious manner than before. But Edigu's success did not last long. In the summer of 1419, Jabbār Berdi's brother Qādir Berdi set out to claim the throne with Lithuanian support. He defeated and killed Darwīsh, while Edigu fled to the Crimea, where he raised Beg Ṣūfī to the throne as his next protégé.

== Descendants ==
According to the Muʿizz al-ansāb and Tawārīḫ-i guzīdah-i nuṣrat-nāmah, Darwīsh had a daughter, Shukr-Bīka, who married the Timurid pādishāh Ulugh Beg.

== Genealogy ==
- Genghis Khan
- Jochi
- Tuqa-Timur
- Kay-Tīmūr
- Achiq
- Abāy
- Mīnkāsar
- Mamkī
- Altī-Qurtuqā
- Darwīsh

== See also ==
- List of khans of the Golden Horde

== Bibliography ==
- Gaev, A. G., "Genealogija i hronologija Džučidov," Numizmatičeskij sbornik 3 (2002) 9-55.
- Howorth, H. H., History of the Mongols from the 9th to the 19th Century. Part II.1. London, 1880.
- Počekaev, R. J., Cari ordynskie: Biografii hanov i pravitelej Zolotoj Ordy. Saint Petersburg, 2010.
- Reva, R., "Borba za vlast' v pervoj polovine XV v.," in Zolotaja Orda v mirovoj istorii, Kazan', 2016: 704–729.
- Sabitov, Ž. M., Genealogija "Tore", Astana, 2008.
- Sagdeeva, R. Z., Serebrjannye monety hanov Zolotoj Ordy, Moscow, 2005.
- Tizengauzen, V. G. (trans.), Sbornik materialov otnosjaščihsja k istorii Zolotoj Ordy. Izvlečenija iz persidskih sočinenii, republished as Istorija Kazahstana v persidskih istočnikah. 4. Almaty, 2006.
- Vohidov, Š. H. (trans.), Istorija Kazahstana v persidskih istočnikah. 3. Muʿizz al-ansāb. Almaty, 2006.

Preceded by Jabbār Berdi	Khan of the Golden Horde; 1417–1419	Succeeded by Qādir Berdi
