= Pulad =

Khan of the Golden Horde from 1407 to 1410

Pūlād
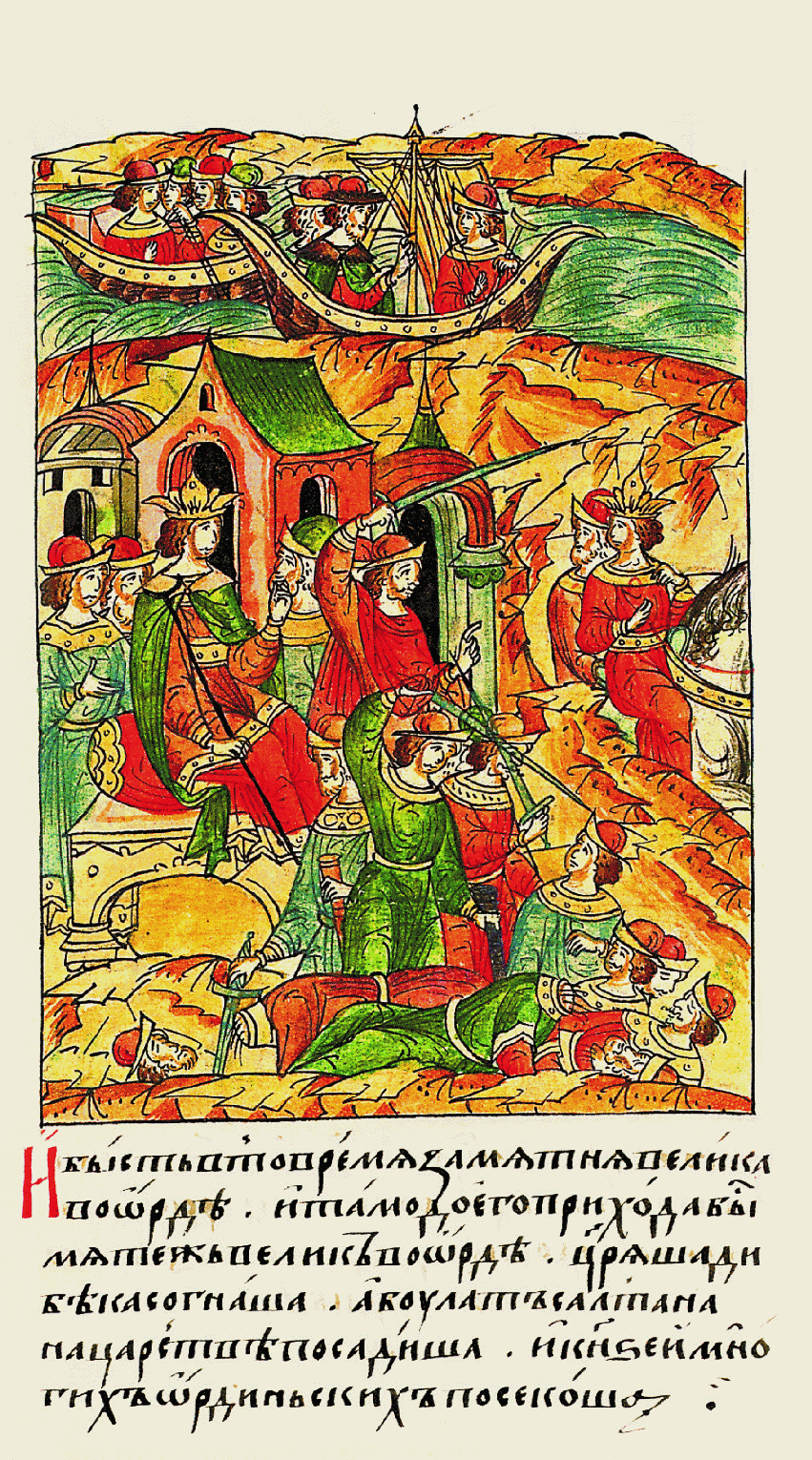
- Flight of Shādī Beg and enthronement of Pūlād, miniature from the Illustrated Chronicle of Ivan the Terrible, 16th century

Khan of the Golden Horde
- Reign: 1407–1410
- Predecessor: Shādī Beg
- Successor: Tīmūr
- Died: 1411?
- Dynasty: Borjigin
- Father: Tīmūr Qutluq
- Religion: Islam

Pūlād (Persian: پولاد; Turki/Kypchak: بولاد; Bulat Saltan in Russian chronicles) was Khan of the Golden Horde from 1407 to 1410, in the waning days of the khanate. He ruled as the protégé of the beglerbeg Edigu.

== Ancestry ==
According to the Muʿizz al-ansāb and the Tawārīḫ-i guzīdah-i nuṣrat-nāmah, Pūlād was a son of Tīmūr Qutluq Khan, and thus a younger cousin of his immediate predecessor Shādī Beg. An erroneous tradition, shared by Khwandamir, that Pūlād was the son of Shādī Beg, has been widespread in historiography.

== Reign ==
When Shādī Beg's plot against Edigu was discovered and Shādī Beg fled in late 1407, Edigu raised Pūlād, the son of the former khan Tīmūr Qutluq on the throne. Although Pūlād had an older brother, Tīmūr, the latter was reputed to be obstinate, and Edigu accordingly preferred to make Pūlād his new khan. Edigu's open conflict with his previous khan, Shādī Beg, may have undermined his reputation and authority, and this may have contributed to his decision to seek out a new war in the hope of glory and plunder. His chosen target was the Russian grand prince Vasilij I Dmitrievič of Moscow, who had failed to send regular tribute to the khan's court, or to appear in person for his investiture, and who had sheltered some of the sons of the former khan Tokhtamysh, Edigu's enemy. Elsewhere, Pūlād Khan's involvement in Russian affairs tended to be based on diplomacy, investing Ivan Mihajlovič with Tver' and Ivan Vladimirovič of Pronsk with Rjazan' in 1407. But Vasilij of Moscow was going to be faced with a full-scale invasion. In November 1408, Edigu advanced on Moscow, taking the towns of Kolomna, Perejaslavl', Rostov, Dmitrov, Serpuhov, Nižnij Novgorod, and Gorodec with relative ease. After this, Edigu's forces united before Moscow to commence the siege of the city. However, while this was going on, Pūlād Khan was faced with a crisis at the capital, Sarai: Vasilij of Moscow had encouraged Karīm Berdi, a son of Tokhtamysh, to seize the throne of the Golden Horde. Karīm Berdi was able to seize Sarai virtually unopposed, forcing Pūlād Khan to flee and seek Edigu's assistance in early 1409.

Edigu abandoned the siege of Moscow, saving face with a ransom of 3,000 rubles, and hurried off to Sarai. He was able to chase out Karīm Bedi and to return his khan, Pūlād, to the capital. Although much of Muscovy had been devastated, both the Golden Horde's ability to control it and Edigu's own prestige had suffered a setback. Perhaps anticipating a reaction, Edigu resigned from the position of beglerbeg, which was given to his younger brother ʿIsā; in effect, this allowed Edigu to continue to exercise political influence. An embassy to the Timurid Shāh Rukh, sent in the name of Pūlād Khan in 1409, returned laden with gifts, and included an agreement for Edigu's daughter to marry Shāh Rukh's son Muḥammad-Jūkī. In 1410, Pūlād Khan and Edige campaigned against the Venetians of Tana, causing much destruction and capturing the Venetian consul; Genoese Kaffa avoided the same fate by paying a hefty ransom.

In late 1410 or early 1411, Pūlād ceased to reign. According to one account, he was dethroned and replaced by his own older brother Tīmūr, who also caused Edigu to flee for safety in Khwarazm. According to another account, Tokhtamysh's son Jalāl ad-Dīn killed Pūlād during an invasion in 1411, but failed to dislodge Edigu, who made Pūlād's brother Tīmūr khan instead, before quarreling with him. Pūlād did not leave recorded offspring.

== Genealogy ==
- Genghis Khan
- Jochi
- Tuqa-Timur
- Kay Timur
- Abay
- Numqan
- Qutluq Tīmūr
- Tīmūr Beg
- Tīmūr Qutluq
- Pūlād

== See also ==
- List of khans of the Golden Horde

== Bibliography ==
- Gaev, A. G., "Genealogija i hronologija Džučidov," Numizmatičeskij sbornik 3 (2002) 9-55.
- Howorth, H. H., History of the Mongols from the 9th to the 19th Century. Part II.1. London, 1880.
- Pilipčuk, J. V., and Ž. M. Sabitov, "Bor'ba Toktamyševičej za vlast' v 10–20-h gg. XV v.," Iz istorii i kult'ury narodov Srednego Povolž'ja 6 (2016) 110-125.
- Počekaev, R. J., Cari ordynskie: Biografii hanov i pravitelej Zolotoj Ordy. Saint Petersburg, 2010.
- Reva, R., "Borba za vlast' v pervoj polovine XV v.," in Zolotaja Orda v mirovoj istorii, Kazan', 2016: 704-729.
- Sabitov, Ž. M., Genealogija "Tore", Astana, 2008.
- Thackston, W. M. (trans.), Khwandamir, Habibu's-siyar. Tome Three. Cambridge, MA, 1994.
- Tizengauzen, V. G. (trans.), Sbornik materialov otnosjaščihsja k istorii Zolotoj Ordy. Izvlečenija iz persidskih sočinenii, republished as Istorija Kazahstana v persidskih istočnikah. 4. Almaty, 2006.

Regnal titles
Preceded by Shādī Beg	Khan of the Golden Horde; 1407–1410	Succeeded by Tīmūr
