= Berdy =

Berdy may refer to:

- Berdy (Orenburg), former work settlement in Orenburg Oblast; since 1959—a part of the city of Orenburg
- Berdy, Kaluga Obast, village in Kozelsky District of Kaluga Oblast, Russia
- Sean Berdy (born 1993), American actor

== See also ==
- Berdi
