= Kebek (Golden Horde) =

Khan of the Golden Horde from 1413 to 1414

Khan of the Golden Horde
- Reign: 1413–1414
- Predecessor: Karīm Berdi
- Successor: Karīm Berdi
- Died: 1414
- Dynasty: Borjigin
- Father: Tokhtamysh
- Religion: Islam

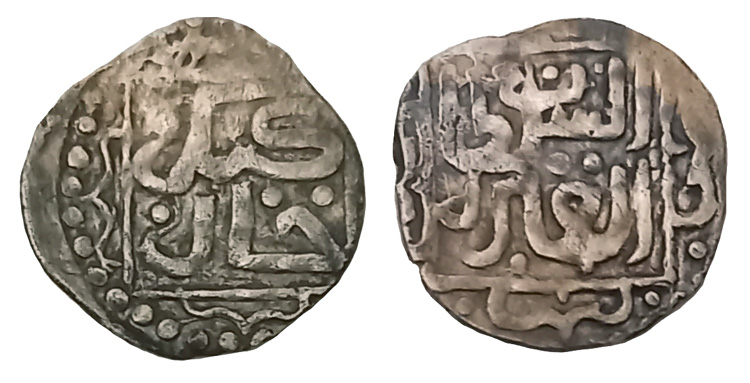
Kepek. Dirham, Sarai 1414

Kebek or Kepek (Turki/Kypchak: کبک) was Khan of the Golden Horde from 1413 to 1414.

== Ancestry ==
Kebek was a son of Tokhtamysh and a brother of his immediate predecessor (and successor) Karīm Berdi. They were descendants of Tuqa-Timur, the son of Jochi, the son of Chinggis Khan.

== Life ==
After their father was killed in battle against Shādī Beg Khan and Nūr ad-Dīn, the son of Edigu, in 1407, the sons of Tokhtamysh dispersed. Some, led by the eldest, Jalāl ad-Dīn, fled to Moscow and then to Lithuania. Others, including Kebek, sought refuge in Sighnaq, under Timurid protection. In early 1409, one of the brothers, Karīm Berdi, briefly seized the capital Sarai. In early 1412, Jalāl ad-Dīn did the same, eliminating his rival, Tīmūr Khan. In October of the same year, however, Jalāl ad-Dīn was murdered by one of his brothers, according to some accounts Kebek. Karīm Berdi became khan again, reversing Jalāl ad-Dīn's policies, showing himself amenable to the reigning princes in Russia and hostile to Grand Prince Vytautas of Lithuania. Vytautas responded by proclaiming a certain "Betsabul" as khan in opposition to Karīm Berdi. In combination with other evidence, it is believed that "Betsabul" was actually Kebek, who succeeded in driving out Karīm Berdi with Lithuanian help, in the spring of 1413.

Now khan, Kebek naturally favored his Lithuanian protector and ally, Vytautas. Kebek's authority was quickly recognized throughout the Golden Horde. In the summer of 1413, he campaigned in the Crimea, besieging Genoese Kaffa, but he abandoned the siege on 12 June. He was apparently called away by the threat posed by Edigu. Engaged in negotiations with Jalāl ad-Dīn and Karīm Berdi, Edigu had refrained from setting up a new puppet khan of his own, but Kebek's usurpation led him to proclaim one Chekre, a descendant of Tuqa-Timur, as khan in Sibir and Bolghar in 1413. Despite an initial victory over Chekre, Kebek suffered reverses at the hands of Edigu; but the main beneficiary of this was Karīm Berdi. After several battles, Karīm Berdi defeated, captured, and beheaded Kebek in 1414. The victory allowed Karīm Berdi to resume the throne, but before long another of his brothers, Jabbār Berdi was set up as a rival khan by Vytautas of Lithuania.

== Descendants ==
According to the Muʿizz al-ansāb, Kebek had a son, Chaghatāy-Sulṭān, and two daughters, Sarāy-Mulk and Shīrīn-Bīka. The Tawārīḫ-i guzīdah-i nuṣrat-nāmah mentions only the first and last.

== Genealogy ==
- Genghis Khan
- Jochi
- Tuqa-Timur
- Urung-Timur
- Saricha
- Kuyunchak
- Qutluq Khwāja
- Tuy Khwāja
- Tokhtamysh
- Kebek

== Bibliography ==
- Gaev, A. G., "Genealogija i hronologija Džučidov," Numizmatičeskij sbornik 3 (2002) 9–55.
- Howorth, H. H., History of the Mongols from the 9th to the 19th Century. Part II.1. London, 1880.
- Sabitov, Ž. M., Genealogija "Tore", Astana, 2008.
- Seleznëv, J. V., Èlita Zolotoj Ordy: Naučno-spravočnoe izdanie, Kazan', 2009.
- Pilipčuk, J. V., and Ž. M. Sabitov, "Bor'ba Toktamyševičej za vlast' v 10–20-h gg. XV v.," Iz istorii i kult'ury narodov Srednego Povolž'ja 6 (2016) 110–125.
- Počekaev, R. J., Cari ordynskie: Biografii hanov i pravitelej Zolotoj Ordy. Saint Petersburg, 2010.
- Reva, R., "Borba za vlast' v pervoj polovine XV v.," in Zolotaja Orda v mirovoj istorii, Kazan', 2016: 704–729.
- Vohidov, Š. H. (trans.), Istorija Kazahstana v persidskih istočnikah. 3. Muʿizz al-ansāb. Almaty, 2006.

Kebek (Golden Horde) Borjigin (1206–1635)
Regnal titles
Preceded by Karīm Berdi	Khan of the Golden Horde; 1413–1414	Succeeded by Karīm Berdi
