= Timur (Golden Horde) =

Khan of the Golden Horde from 1410 to 1412

Tīmūr
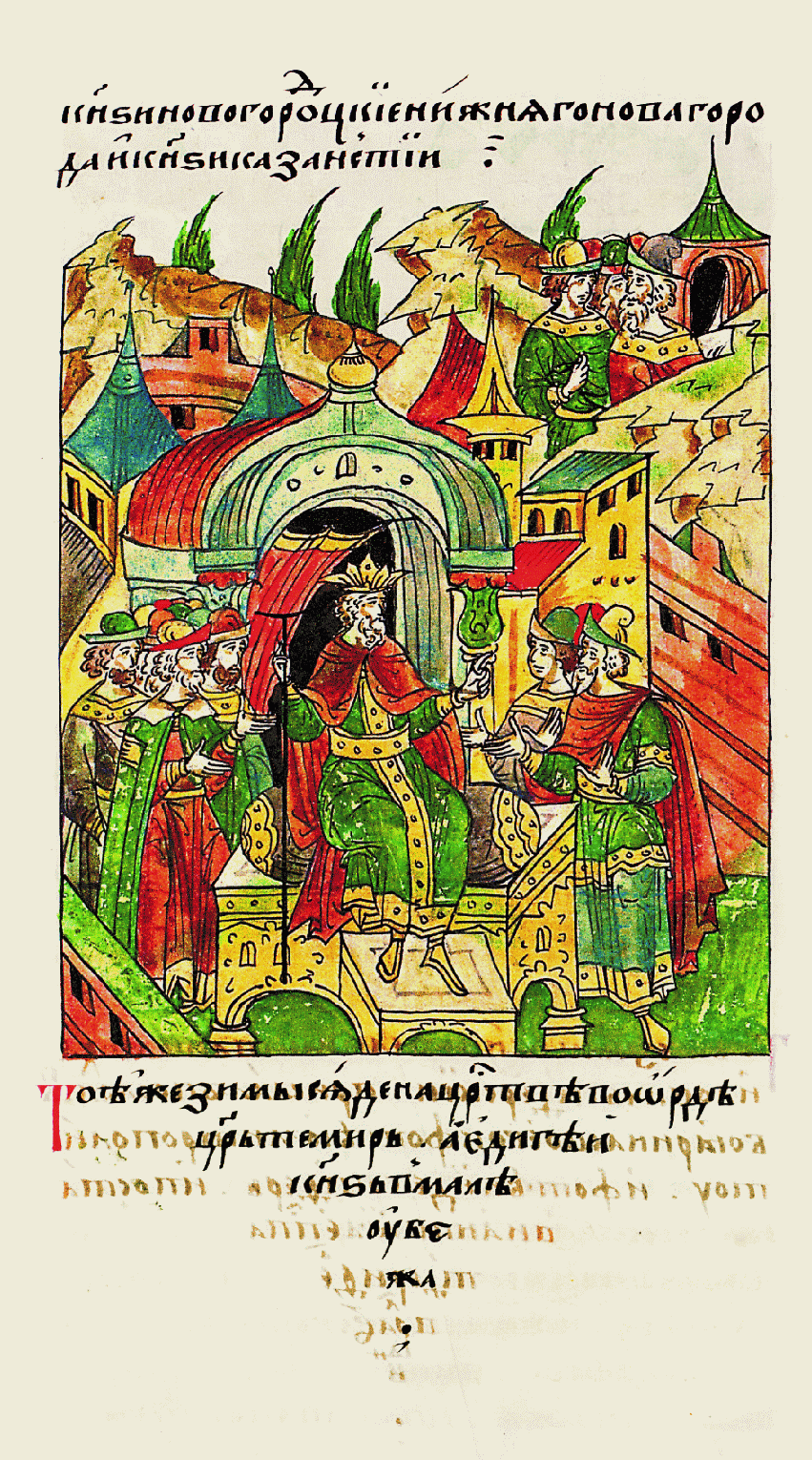
- Tīmūr made khan, while Edigu flees. Miniature from the Illustrated Chronicle of Ivan the Terrible (16th century)

Khan of the Golden Horde
- Reign: 1410–1412
- Predecessor: Pūlād
- Successor: Jalāl ad-Dīn
- Died: 1412
- Issue: Küchük Muḥammad
- Dynasty: Borjigin
- Father: Tīmūr Qutluq
- Religion: Islam

Tīmūr or Temür (Kypchak: تمور خان; Turki and Persian: تیمور خان ابن تیمور قتلغ; died 1412) was Khan of the Golden Horde from 1410 to 1412, in the waning days of the khanate.

== Ancestry ==
According to the Muʿizz al-ansāb and the Tawārīḫ-i guzīdah-i nuṣrat-nāmah, Tīmūr was a son of Tīmūr Qutluq Khan, and a brother of his immediate predecessor Pūlād.

== Reign ==
When the all-powerful beglerbeg Edigu needed to replace Shādī Beg Khan in late 1407, he turned to the sons of the previous khan, Tīmūr Qutluq. He passed over the older son, Tīmūr, who had a reputation for obstinacy, in favor of a younger son, Pūlād. Three years later, with Pūlād and Edigu smarting after a failure to take Moscow and the brief usurpation of a rival, Tokhtamysh's son Karīm Berdi at Sarai, the bypassed Tīmūr became khan in disputed circumstances. According to one account, he staged a coup, dethroning Pūlād, and causing the now unpopular Edigu to flee. Thus, Tīmūr became khan in late 1410 or early 1411. According to another account, Pūlād was killed in battle by another son of Tokhtamysh's, Jalāl ad-Dīn, but the latter failed to seize power and Edigu placed Tīmūr on the throne, before quarreling with him and being forced to flee.

Opposed even by his own eldest son Nūr ad-Dīn, Edigu escaped together with another son, Sulṭān-Maḥmūd (born of Tokhtamysh's daughter Jānika), to Khwarazm, which was governed by yet another of his sons, Mubārak Shāh. The new khan, Tīmūr immediately sent an army to pursue the fugitives, under the command of a new beglerbeg, Tekne, and emir the Ghāzān. The khan's force defeated Edigu's and besieged him for some six months, during which there were several bloody battles. While this was going on, Tīmūr, found himself under attack by Tokhtamysh's sons Jalāl ad-Dīn, Sulṭān-Ḥusayn, and Muḥammad. They drove the khan out of Sarai and the eldest of the brothers, Jalāl ad-Dīn, took the throne. Meanwhile, Tīmūr had joined his troops in Khwarazm and attempted to advance against Jalāl ad-Dīn. However, Tīmūr was faced with such desertion to the enemy, that he eventually attempted to flee. His emir Ghāzān was suborned by Jalāl ad-Dīn, whose sister he had married. Getting the beglerbeg Tekne drunk, Ghāzān sent his retainer Jān Khwāja to murder Tīmūr Khan, sometime in late 1411 or early 1412.

== Descendants ==
Tīmūr is said to have married one of Edigu's daughters. Only one son is known, Muḥammad, known as Küchük Muḥammad ("Little Muḥammad"), who would rule the Golden Horde in 1434–1459, and would be the ancestor of later khans there, in Astrakhan, and eventually even in Transoxiana.

== Genealogy ==
- Genghis Khan
- Jochi
- Tuqa-Timur
- Kay Timur
- Abay
- Numqan
- Qutluq Tīmūr
- Tīmūr Beg
- Tīmūr Qutluq
- Tīmūr

== See also ==
- List of khans of the Golden Horde

== Bibliography ==
- Gaev, A. G., "Genealogija i hronologija Džučidov," Numizmatičeskij sbornik 3 (2002) 9-55.
- Howorth, H. H., History of the Mongols from the 9th to the 19th Century. Part II.1. London, 1880.
- Pilipčuk, J. V., and Ž. M. Sabitov, "Bor'ba Toktamyševičej za vlast' v 10–20-h gg. XV v.," Iz istorii i kult'ury narodov Srednego Povolž'ja 6 (2016) 110-125.
- Počekaev, R. J., Cari ordynskie: Biografii hanov i pravitelej Zolotoj Ordy. Saint Petersburg, 2010.
- Reva, R., "Borba za vlast' v pervoj polovine XV v.," in Zolotaja Orda v mirovoj istorii, Kazan', 2016: 704-729.
- Sabitov, Ž. M., Genealogija "Tore", Astana, 2008.
- Seleznëv, J. V., Èlita Zolotoj Ordy: Naučno-spravočnoe izdanie, Kazan', 2009.
- Tizengauzen, V. G. (trans.), Sbornik materialov otnosjaščihsja k istorii Zolotoj Ordy. Izvlečenija iz persidskih sočinenii, republished as Istorija Kazahstana v persidskih istočnikah. 4. Almaty, 2006.

Regnal titles
Preceded by Shādī Beg	Khan of the Golden Horde; 1410–1412	Succeeded by Jalāl ad-Dīn
