= Jalal al-Din Khan ibn Tokhtamysh =

Khan of the Golden Horde from 1411 to 1412

Jalal al-Din Khan
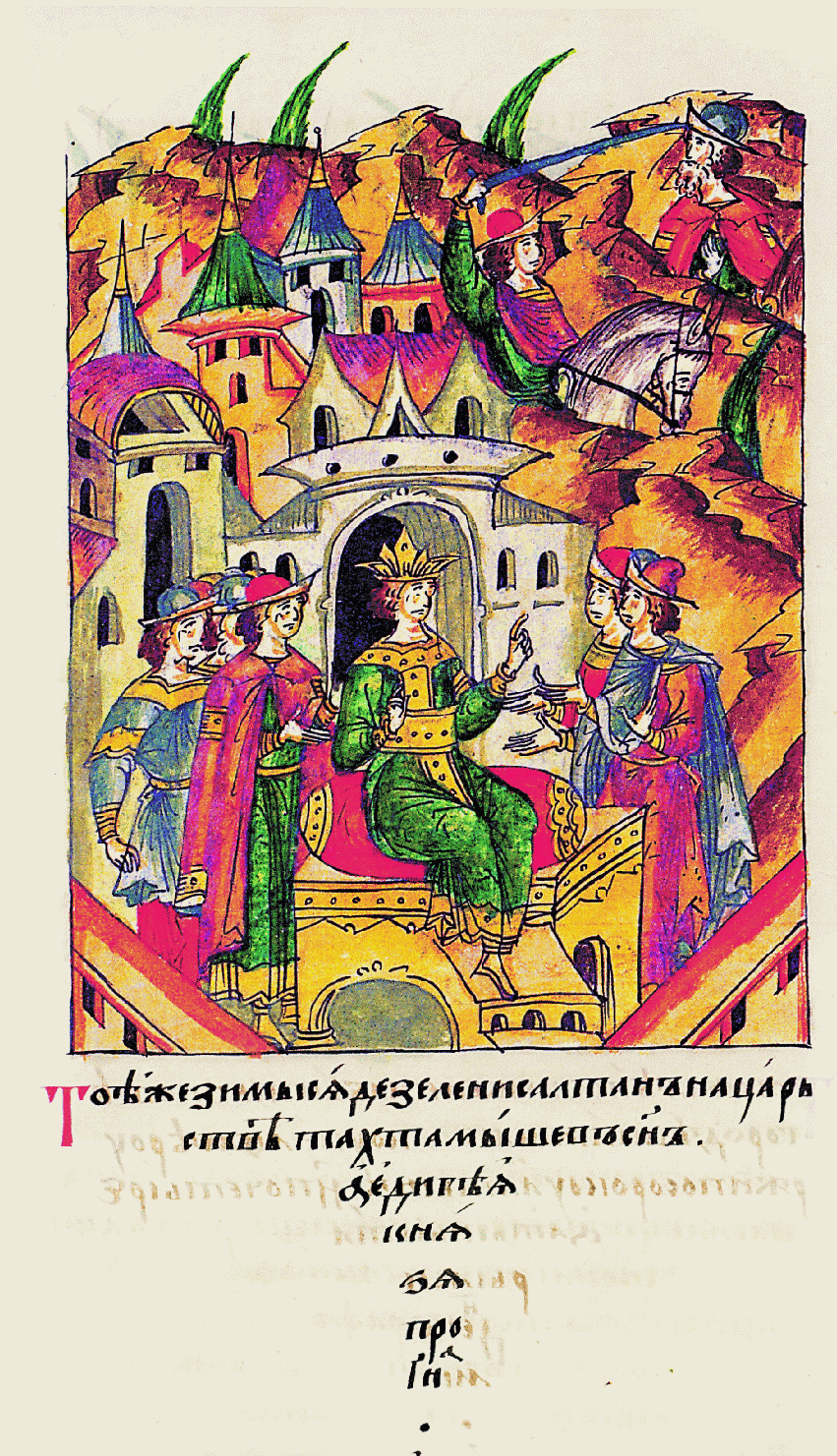
- Jalāl ad-Dīn enthroned and Edigu expelled, miniature from the Illustrated Chronicle of Ivan the Terrible, 16th century

Khan of the Golden Horde
- Reign: 1411–1412
- Predecessor: Tīmūr
- Successor: Karīm Berdi
- Born: 1380
- Died: 1412 (aged 31–32)
- Dynasty: Borjigin
- Father: Tokhtamysh
- Religion: Islam

Jalal al-Din or Jalāl ad-Dīn (Turki/Kypchak and Persian: جلال الدین; Polish: Dżalal ad-Din; 1380–1412) was Khan of the Golden Horde from 1411 to 1412. He was the son of Tokhtamysh, Khan of the Golden Horde until 1395, by Ṭaghāy Beg Khatun, the daughter of Ḥājjī Beg. In Russian texts, he is also known as Zeleni-Saltan, sometimes translated as 'Green Sultan'.

== Life ==
After being dethroned by the beglerbeg Edigu and replaced with Tīmūr-Qutluq, Tokhtamysh had attempted to regain his throne with Lithuanian aid, but was defeated in 1399. He continued his resistance from Sibir until he was killed against Edigu in 1406. Tokhtamysh's sons, including Jalāl ad-Dīn, sought refuge at the court of the Grand Prince of Moscow, Vasilij I Dmitrievič, who refused to extradite them. During Edigu's attack on Moscow, Vasilij intended to use Tokhtamysh's sons to counterattack and undermine the enemy at its capital, Sarai. Indeed, one of Tokhtamysh's sons, Karīm Berdi succeeded in briefly driving out Edigu's khan Pūlād from the city in 1409. Edigu was forced to abandon his siege of Moscow to recover control of Sarai.

Subsequently, Jalāl ad-Dīn went to Lithuania, seeking support from the Lithuanian Grand Prince Vytautas. In 1410, he fought under Vytautas in the victorious Battle of Grunwald against the Teutonic Order. Jalāl ad-Dīn commanded a Tatar unit on the right wing of the Polish-Lithuanian forces.

In unclear circumstances Jalāl ad-Dīn raided into the Golden Horde from Lithuania in 1411, killing in battle Edigu's khan, Pūlād, but was unable to establish himself in power at the time. Edigu made Pūlād's brother Tīmūr the new khan, but the latter harnessed a reaction against Edigu, causing him to flee to Khwarazm. As the new khan was preoccupied with Edigu in the east, Jalāl ad-Dīn and his brothers saw an opportunity to recover their father's throne. With Lithuanian support, the brothers raided into the Golden Horde in 1411, first seizing Crimea, then advancing on Sarai and driving out Tīmūr Khan. Jalāl ad-Dīn now became khan, and determined to eliminate Tīmūr, who had joined his own troops besieging Edigu in Khwarazm. Tīmūr commenced a march against Jalāl ad-Dīn, but saw much of his force desert to the enemy, and turned to flight. Jalāl ad-Dīn convinced Tīmūr's emir Ghāzān, married to one of Jalāl ad-Dīn's sisters, to murder the fugitive khan in late 1411 or early 1412.

Jalāl ad-Dīn rewarded Ghāzān by making him beglerbeg, and entrusted him a force to attack Edigu, whose son Sulṭān-Maḥmūd was Jalāl ad-Dīn's nephew; in exchange for Sulṭān-Maḥmūd, the new khan promised Edigu peace. Assured of Edigu's promised compliance, Ghāzān returned to the khan, who, distrusting Edigu, sent a new force against him, under Qajulay. Despite his superiority in numbers, Qajulay was defeated and killed by Edigu with a stratagem. His failure to eliminate Edigu and his son Nūr ad-Dīn notwithstanding, Jalāl ad-Dīn seemingly consolidated his position in the Golden Horde, issuing coins at (old) Astrakhan and Bolghar. He demanded that his former protector, Grand Prince Vasilij II of Moscow, cede Nižnij Novgorod back to the descendants of its ruling line, and both Vasilij of Moscow and Ivan Mihajlovič of Tver' set out for the khan's court to assuage him in person. By the time they arrived, however, Jalāl ad-Dīn was dead, before October 27, 1412.

Jalāl ad-Dīn is characterized by Muʿīn-ad-Dīn Naṭanzī as worthy, respectable, handsome, well-spoken, and given to council with worthy people. However, his good fortune and personal bravery caused him to abandon caution. This allowed him to be murdered at night on his very throne by his envious brother Sulṭān-Muḥammad. The fratricide is variously identified as Karīm Berdi or Kebek or Jabbār Berdi, each of whom reigned for a short while after Jalāl ad-Dīn; the manner of his death is also given as being killed in battle against one of his brothers, or shot with an arrow by one of his brothers during a battle against Edigu. He reigned for about a year, dying before October 27, 1412.

== Descendants ==
According to the Muʿizz al-ansāb, Jalāl ad-Dīn had two sons: Abū-Saʿīd and Amān-Bīk. The Tawārīḫ-i guzīdah-i nuṣrat-nāmah mentions only the first of the two.

== Genealogy ==
- Genghis Khan
- Jochi
- Tuqa-Timur
- Urung-Timur
- Saricha
- Kuyunchak
- Qutluq Khwāja
- Tuy Khwāja
- Tokhtamysh
- Jalāl ad-Dīn

== Bibliography ==
- Gaev, A. G., "Genealogija i hronologija Džučidov," Numizmatičeskij sbornik 3 (2002) 9-55.
- Howorth, H. H., History of the Mongols from the 9th to the 19th Century. Part II.1. London, 1880.
- Sabitov, Ž. M., Genealogija "Tore", Astana, 2008.
- Seleznëv, J. V., Èlita Zolotoj Ordy: Naučno-spravočnoe izdanie, Kazan', 2009.
- Pilipčuk, J. V., and Ž. M. Sabitov, "Bor'ba Toktamyševičej za vlast' v 10–20-h gg. XV v.," Iz istorii i kult'ury narodov Srednego Povolž'ja 6 (2016) 110-125.
- Počekaev, R. J., Cari ordynskie: Biografii hanov i pravitelej Zolotoj Ordy. Saint Petersburg, 2010.
- Reva, R., "Borba za vlast' v pervoj polovine XV v.," in Zolotaja Orda v mirovoj istorii, Kazan', 2016: 704-729.
- Vohidov, Š. H. (trans.), Istorija Kazahstana v persidskih istočnikah. 3. Muʿizz al-ansāb. Almaty, 2006.

Jalal al-Din Khan ibn Tokhtamysh Borjigin (1206–1635)
Regnal titles
Preceded by Tīmūr	Khan of the Golden Horde; 1411–1412	Succeeded by Karīm Berdi
