= Sawran (Kazakhstan) =

Ancient city located in the vicinity of Turkestan, Kazakhstan

- Sauran; Сауран
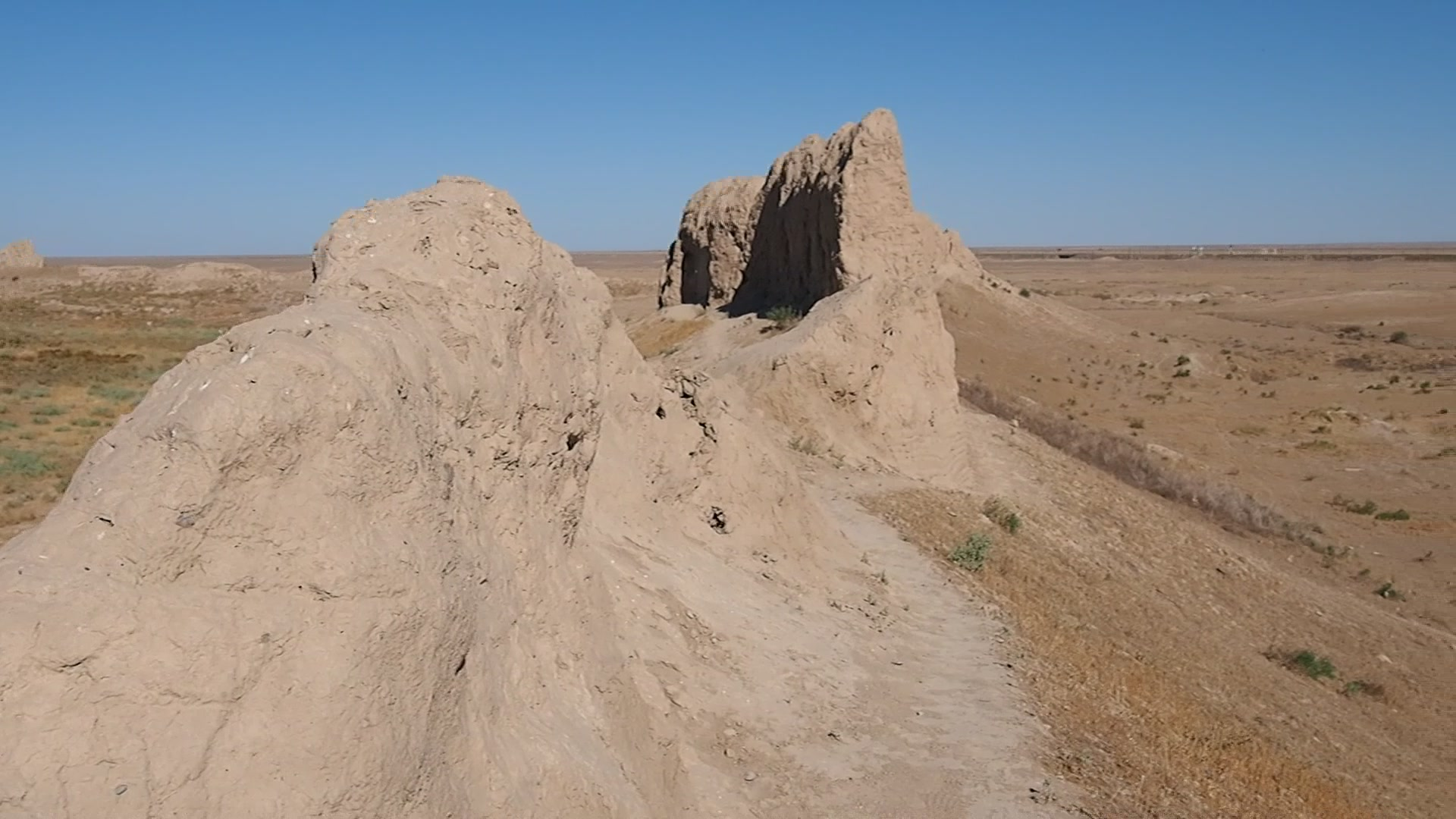
- Part of the ancient city wall of Sawran

- Location within Kazakhstan Location within West and Central Asia
- 43.515278°N 67.768611°E
- Location: Southern Kazakhstan oblast

History
- Built: 6th century CE
- Abandoned: 1515 CE

Site notes
- Excavation dates: 20th century
- Condition: ruin

Sawran or Sauran (Kazakh: Сауран, romanized: Sauran, pronounced [sɑwˈɾɑn]) is an ancient city located 43 kilometres (27 mi) north-west of the city of Turkistan in Southern Kazakhstan, near the river Syr Darya.

== History ==
One of the earliest mentions of the city comes from the Arab geographer Al-Muqaddasi, who described it in the 10th century as "a large city surrounded by seven walls, mosque located in the inner city." In 1065, the city submitted to the Seljuq dynasty, which was part of the transformation of the Kara-Khanid Khanate into a vassal of the Seljuqs.

Around the 1370s, when the region was under the control of Urus Khan, Tokhtamysh of the blue horde, heavily supported by Amir Timur, tried to conquer the region, aiming to rule the cities of Sawran, Otrar, Saganac, Seiram, Serai, and others. The city provided the brick and tile for the construction of Mausoleum of Khoja Ahmed Yasawi, which was commissioned by Amir Timur in 1389 and is located 25 miles (40 km) from the city.

By the 15th century, the city had established diplomatic relations with the Ming dynasty, which recorded the name of the city in the Ming Shilu as 掃蘭 (saolan). The poet Zayn al-Din Mahmud Vasifi visited the city from 1514 to 1515, and described the city's karez water infrastructure.

Like Otrar, the city suffered with the decline of Silk Road, and struggles for power in the region.
