= Qadir Berdi =

Khan of the Golden Horde in 1419

Qādir Berdi

Khan of the Golden Horde
- Reign: 1419
- Predecessor: Darwīsh
- Successor: Ḥājjī Muḥammad
- Died: 1419
- Dynasty: Borjigin
- Father: Tokhtamysh

Qādir Berdi (Turki/Kypchak and Persian: قادر بردی) was briefly the khan of the Golden Horde in 1419.

== Ancestry ==
Qādir Berdi was one of the several sons of Tokhtamysh Khan to reign briefly in the early fifteenth century. They were descendants of Tuqa-Timur, the son of Jochi, the son of Chinggis Khan. Qādir Berdi's mother is said to have been a Circassian concubine.

== Reign ==
In 1417, the beglerbeg Edigu eliminated Tokhtamysh's son Jabbār Berdi and made khan another Tuqa-Timurid, Darwīsh. For a short while, Edigu seemed to have triumphed over his foes, the sons of Tokhtamysh. However, there was yet another one of them, Qādir Berdi, able and willing to claim his father's throne, once more with the support of Grand Prince Vytautas of Lithuania. In the summer of 1419, Qādir Berdi advanced from Lithuania into the Golden Horde, and apparently eliminated Darwīsh Khan, assuming the throne of the Golden Horde. Qādir Berdi's reign found support from the sons of his sister Jānika: emir Tegene Bey of the Shirin clan and Edigu's son Nūr ad-Dīn, who was often in disagreement with his father. Qādir Berdi issued coins at Bolghar. Edigu had fled to the Crimea and proclaimed yet another Tuqa-Timurid, Beg Ṣūfī, as his khan, while sending an envoy to seek peace from Vytautas, in vain. Qādir Berdi pressed his advantage, defeating Edigu's new khan (who survived in the Crimea until 1421), and causing Edigu to flee eastward, toward his power base. Here he declared a new khan, the Shibanid Ḥājjī Muḥammad, and swore his sons to uphold his cause. Qādir Berdi continued his pursuit of Edigu, crossing the Volga and advancing to the Ural. Here in late 1419 or early 1420 he closed battle with Edigu, with fatal consequences for both leaders: Qādir Berdi was killed in the fight and his forces dispersed; but Edigu's troops also routed and he also perished. He was heavily wounded in the battle and finished off on the orders of a former emir of Tokhtamysh, who had learned of Edigu's location. The opponents of Edigu's sons now looked to Qādir Berdi's younger brother Kūchuk Muḥammad (not to be confused with the later khan called Küchük Muḥammad) as their khan.

== Genealogy ==
- Genghis Khan
- Jochi
- Tuqa-Timur
- Urung-Timur
- Saricha
- Kuyunchak
- Qutluq Khwāja
- Tuy Khwāja
- Tokhtamysh
- Qādir Berdi

== See also ==
- List of khans of the Golden Horde

== Bibliography ==
- Bosworth, C. E., The New Islamic Dynasties, New York, 1996.
- Gaev, A. G., "Genealogija i hronologija Džučidov," Numizmatičeskij sbornik 3 (2002) 9-55.
- Howorth, H. H., History of the Mongols from the 9th to the 19th Century. Part II.1. London, 1880.
- Pilipčuk, J. V., and Ž. M. Sabitov, "Bor'ba Toktamyševičej za vlast' v 10–20-h gg. XV v.," Iz istorii i kult'ury narodov Srednego Povolž'ja 6 (2016) 110–125.
- Počekaev, R. J., Cari ordynskie: Biografii hanov i pravitelej Zolotoj Ordy. Saint Petersburg, 2010.
- Reva, R., "Borba za vlast' v pervoj polovine XV v.," in Zolotaja Orda v mirovoj istorii, Kazan', 2016: 704–729.
- Sabitov, Ž. M., Genealogija "Tore", Astana, 2008.
- Sagdeeva, R. Z., Serebrjannye monety hanov Zolotoj Ordy, Moscow, 2005.
- Seleznëv, J. V., Èlita Zolotoj Ordy: Naučno-spravočnoe izdanie, Kazan', 2009.
- Tizengauzen, V. G. (trans.), Sbornik materialov otnosjaščihsja k istorii Zolotoj Ordy. Izvlečenija iz persidskih sočinenii, republished as Istorija Kazahstana v persidskih istočnikah. 4. Almaty, 2006.
- Vohidov, Š. H. (trans.), Istorija Kazahstana v persidskih istočnikah. 3. Muʿizz al-ansāb. Almaty, 2006.

Preceded by Darwīsh	Khan of the Golden Horde; 1419	Succeeded by Ḥājjī Muḥammad
