= Berdy (Orenburg) =

Berdy (Russian: Берды) is a part of the city of Orenburg in Orenburg Oblast, Russia.

The name comes from the Bashkir language and translated as fish Grayling (Bashkir: Bәrҙe).

== History ==
Berdskaya in Orenburg Governorate, was founded in 1736 as a serf village. In 1743, the fortress of Berdskaya was chosen as the final place to build the city of Orenburg. Located near the confluence of the river Sakmara into the river Urals. In 1743 in Orenburg was founded at its present location General Shtokman, with Berdskaya fortress attributed to the river SAKMAR. In the middle of the 18th century village Berdskaya located 7 miles from the Orenburg as well.

The Village of Berdskaya (Berdskaya settlement) has played a significant role in the formation of Orenburg Cossack troops. For example, in 1744 the Orenburg irregular corps of 700 people was established from the people of Orenburg and Berd, which became the basis in 1748 of the "Orenburg irregular troops."

In 1773 have settled in Berd rate Yemelyan Pugachev during the siege of their Orenburg as well. The villagers and factories of Berd settlement were sent messengers with his manifesto, in which he declared the eternal will of the people, proclaiming liberation from servitude to the landowners and factory owners, and from taxes and duties. He granted the land, called for the destruction of feudalism, and proclaimed freedom of religion.

In 1833 Alexander Pushkin visited Berdy for the study and collection of materials on the history of Pugachev.

Berdy was merged into Orenburg in 1959.

== Notable people ==
- Alexander P. Korovyakov (b. 16 November 1912, Berdskaya, Orenburg Province; d. 1993, St. Petersburg) - Soviet Russian painter, a painter, a member of the St. Petersburg Union of Artists (before 1992 - Leningrad branch of Union of Artists of the RSFSR), a representative of the Leningrad school of painting.
