= Yeremferden =

Khan of the Golden Horde (r. 1414–1415, 1416–1417)

Jabbār Berdi

Khan of the Golden Horde
- Reign: 1414–1415
- Predecessor: Karīm Berdi
- Successor: Chekre
- Reign: 1416–1417
- Predecessor: Chekre
- Successor: Darwīsh
- Died: 1417
- Dynasty: Borjigin
- Father: Tokhtamysh
- Religion: Sunni Islam

Jabbār Berdi (Turki/Kypchak and Persian: جبار بردی; the name is rendered as Yeremferden in some western sources), was Khan of the Golden Horde from 1414 to 1415 and again from 1416 to 1417.

== Ancestry ==
Jabbār Berdi was a son of Tokhtamysh, and a brother of his immediate predecessor Karīm Berdi. They were descendants of Tuqa-Timur, the son of Jochi, the son of Chinggis Khan.

== Reign ==
Tokhtamysh's son Karīm Berdi broke with his family's traditional alliance with Grand Prince Vytautas of Lithuania, and assumed a hostile attitude. Vytautas responded by setting up as rival khan Karīm Berdi's brother Kebek, but Kebek's displacement of Karīm Berdi in 1413 would not last. By 1414, Karīm Berdi had killed Kebek and recovered his throne. Undaunted, Vytautas proclaimed another son of Tokhtamysh, Jabbār Berdi, as khan and sent him against Karīm Berdi. Jabbār Berdi defeated his brother and took power later in 1414. He naturally favored cooperation with Lithuania, and benefited from its support. Nevertheless, Karīm Berdi was apparently still at large, and Jabbār Berdi had another dangerous enemy in the beglerbeg Edigu, who had already proclaimed his own khan, a Tuqa-Timurid named Chekre. In the confused power struggle, Jabbār Berdi was briefly displaced by Edigu and Chekre in 1415, but succeeded in defeating and killing his rival Chekre in 1416. It was perhaps in the next year, 1417, that Jabbār Berdi also eliminated his own deposed brother, Karīm Berdi. Later the same year, Jabbār Berdi was defeated by Edigu and fled to the Crimea. Edigu declared another Tuqa-Timurid, Darwīsh khan, while Jabbār Berdi was killed by his own retinue as he attempted to seek refuge in Lithuania.

== Genealogy ==
- Genghis Khan
- Jochi
- Tuqa-Timur
- Urung-Timur
- Saricha
- Kuyunchak
- Qutluq Khwāja
- Tuy Khwāja
- Tokhtamysh
- Jabbār Berdi

== Bibliography ==
- Bosworth, C. E., The New Islamic Dynasties, New York, 1996.
- Gaev, A. G., "Genealogija i hronologija Džučidov," Numizmatičeskij sbornik 3 (2002) 9-55.
- Howorth, H. H., History of the Mongols from the 9th to the 19th Century. Part II.1. London, 1880.
- Počekaev, R. J., Cari ordynskie: Biografii hanov i pravitelej Zolotoj Ordy. Saint Petersburg, 2010.
- Reva, R., "Borba za vlast' v pervoj polovine XV v.," in Zolotaja Orda v mirovoj istorii, Kazan', 2016: 704–729.
- Sabitov, Ž. M., Genealogija "Tore", Astana, 2008.
- Seleznëv, J. V., Èlita Zolotoj Ordy: Naučno-spravočnoe izdanie, Kazan', 2009.
- Vohidov, Š. H. (trans.), Istorija Kazahstana v persidskih istočnikah. 3. Muʿizz al-ansāb. Almaty, 2006.

Yeremferden House of Borjigin (Боржигин) (1206–1635)
Regnal titles
Preceded by Karīm Berdi	Khan of the Golden Horde; 1414–1415	Succeeded by Chekre
Preceded by Chekre	Khan of the Golden Horde; 1416–1417	Succeeded by Darwīsh
