= Karim Berdi =

Khan of the Golden Horde (r. 1409; 1412–1413; 1414)

Karīm Berdi
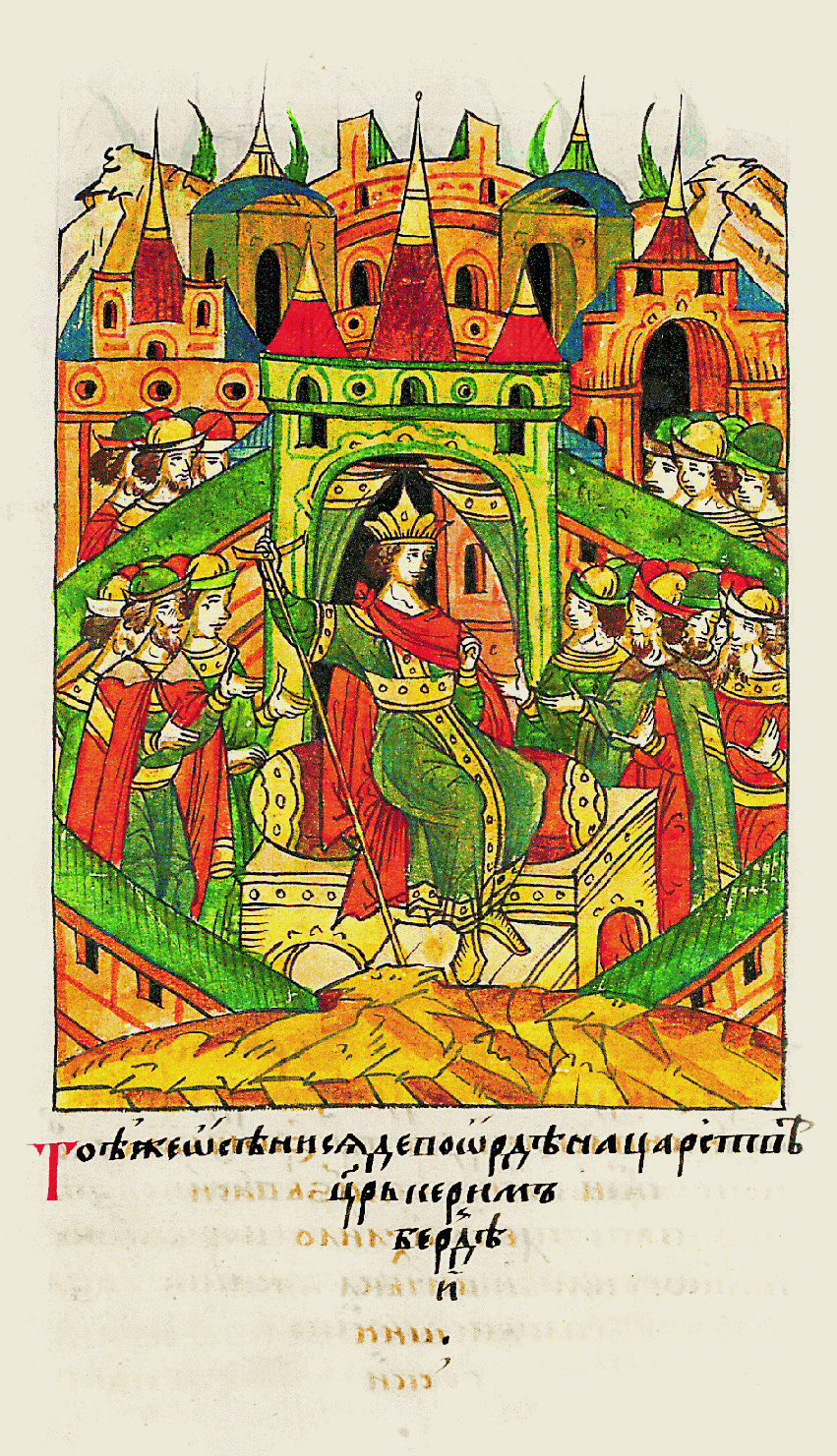
- Karīm Berdi enthroned, miniature from the Illustrated Chronicle of Ivan the Terrible, 16th century

Khan of the Golden Horde
- Reign: 1409
- Predecessor: Pūlād
- Successor: Pūlād
- Reign: 1412–1413
- Predecessor: Jalāl ad-Dīn
- Successor: Kebek
- Reign: 1414
- Predecessor: Kebek
- Successor: Jabbār Berdi
- Died: 1417?
- Issue: Sayyid Aḥmad
- Dynasty: Borjigin
- Father: Tokhtamysh
- Religion: Islam

Karīm Berdi (Turki/Kypchak and Persian: کریم بردی) was Khan of the Golden Horde on several occasions, in 1409, 1412–1413, and in 1414.

== Ancestry ==
Karīm Berdi was one of the sons of Tokhtamysh Khan, and the brother of his immediate predecessor Jalāl ad-Dīn Khan. They were descended from Tuqa-Timur, son of Jochi, son of Chinggis Khan.

== Life ==
After the fall of their father, Tokhtamysh, his sons sought refuge at the court of the grand prince of Moscow, Vasilij I Dmitrievič, who refused to extradite them to their enemy, Edigu, a beglerbeg. During Edigu's attack on Moscow, Vasilij intended to use Tokhtamysh's sons to counterattack and undermine the enemy at its capital, Sarai. It was in this context, that Karīm Berdi took advantage of Edigu's distraction by the siege of Moscow to attack and expel Khan Pūlād from the city in 1409. Although Karīm Berdi took the throne, Edigu abandoned the siege of Moscow and advanced on Sarai, driving out Karīm Berdi and restoring Pūlād's (and his own) control over the city.

After the new monarch, Tīmūr Khan, quarreled with Edigu and caused him to flee to Khwarazm, Tokhtamysh's sons saw an opportunity to recover their father's throne. With Lithuanian support, the brothers invaded the Golden Horde in 1411, drove Tīmūr Khan out of Sarai, and placed Jalāl ad-Dīn on the throne. Although the new khan contrived the elimination of his fugitive rival Tīmūr, he was soon murdered by one of his own brothers. The circumstances of the murder and the identity of the fratricide, Sulṭān-Muḥammad or Karīm Berdi or Kebek or Jabbār Berdi, are reported variously in the sources.

Karīm Berdi ascended the throne at the end of summer 1412 and reigned until at least spring 1413. His authority did not extend to Bolghar, which was held by Edigu, or Khwarazm, which was held by Edigu's son Mubārak Shāh before being conquered by the Timurid Empire in early 1413. Karīm Berdi reversed his brother Jalāl ad-Dīn's policies toward the Russian principalities and Lithuania, having been insulted by the Lithuanian grand prince Vytautas during his time in exile. Thus, he received Vasilij II Vasil'evič of Moscow graciously, and rescinded Jalāl ad-Dīn's decision that Moscow should cede Nižnij Novgorod back to the descendants of its ruling line; in exchange, Vasilij II bound himself to pay regular tribute, a promise he kept. Similarly, Ivan Mihajlovič of Tver' was also received graciously, the investiture of his brother with Tver' was rescinded, and the prince promised not to contend with Vasilij II. Breaking with Vytautas of Lithuania, Karīm Berdi sent an envoy to seek alliance with Sigismund of Hungary in 1413. In retaliation, Vytautas proclaimed a rival khan, called "Betsabul" in western sources, and provided him with support to make his bid for the throne of the Golden Horde. "Betsabul" attacked Karīm Berdi, but was defeated, captured, and beheaded. Undaunted, Vytautas now promoted Karīm Berdi's fugitive brother Jabbār Berdi, who would be more successful. The complicated situation is interpreted as follows: Karīm Berdi was deposed by his brother Kebek ("Betsabul"?) in 1413, before defeating and killing him, briefly recovering the throne in 1414; not long afterwards, Jabbār Berdi defeated Karīm Berdi, forcing his surrender in 1414, and later had him executed, perhaps as late as 1417.

== Descendants ==
According to the Tawārīḫ-i guzīdah-i nuṣrat-nāmah, Karīm Berdi had a son named Sayyid Aḥmad; he is mistakenly placed as a son of Tokhtamysh in the Muʿizz al-ansāb. This Sayyid Aḥmad may have reigned briefly in 1416–1417, but is to be distinguished from the khan of that name who ruled in the southwestern portion of the Golden Horde in 1432–1459, who was a son of Beg Ṣūfī.

== Genealogy ==
- Genghis Khan
- Jochi
- Tuqa-Timur
- Urung-Timur
- Saricha
- Kuyunchak
- Qutluq Khwāja
- Tuy Khwāja
- Tokhtamysh
- Karīm Berdi

== Bibliography ==
- Bespalov, R. A., "Litovsko-ordynskie otnošenija 1419–1429 godov i pervaja popytka obrazovanija Krymskogo hanstva," in Materialy po arheologii i istorii antičnogo i srednevekovogo Kryma 5 (2013) 30–52.
- Gaev, A. G., "Genealogija i hronologija Džučidov," Numizmatičeskij sbornik 3 (2002) 9-55.
- Howorth, H. H., History of the Mongols from the 9th to the 19th Century. Part II.1. London, 1880.
- Parunin, A. V., "«Imperator Solkatskij» Bek-Sufi," Istoričeskij format 4 (2016) 159-168.
- Počekaev, R. J., Cari ordynskie: Biografii hanov i pravitelej Zolotoj Ordy. Saint Petersburg, 2010.
- Reva, R., "Borba za vlast' v pervoj polovine XV v.," in Zolotaja Orda v mirovoj istorii, Kazan', 2016: 704–729.
- Sabitov, Ž. M., Genealogija "Tore", Astana, 2008.
- Sabitov, Ž. M., "K voprosu o genalogii zolotoordynskogo hana Bek-Sufi," in Krim: vìd antičnostì do s'ogodennja, Kiev, 2014, 63–74.
- Seleznëv, J. V., Èlita Zolotoj Ordy: Naučno-spravočnoe izdanie, Kazan', 2009.
- Vohidov, Š. H. (trans.), Istorija Kazahstana v persidskih istočnikah. 3. Muʿizz al-ansāb. Almaty, 2006.

Karim Berdi Borjigin (1206–1635)
Regnal titles
| Preceded by Pūlād | Khan of the Golden Horde; 1409 | Succeeded by Pūlād |
| Preceded by Jalāl ad-Dīn | Khan of the Golden Horde; 1412–1413 | Succeeded by Kebek |
| Preceded by Kebek | Khan of the Golden Horde; 1414 | Succeeded by Jabbār Berdi |
