= Edigu =

Emir of the White Horde, founder of the Nogai Horde

- Emir; Beylerbey
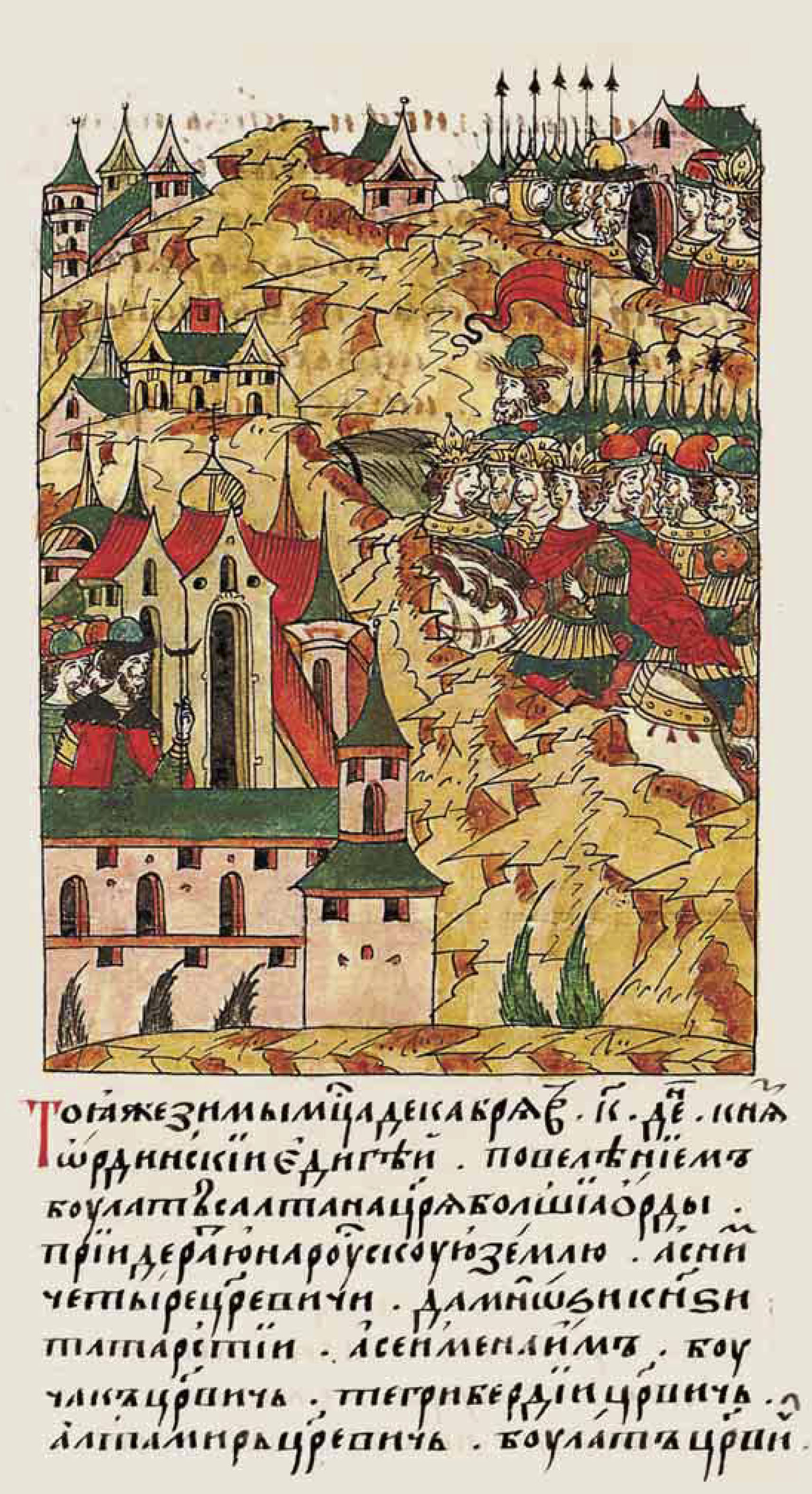
- Edigu's invasion of the Russian lands, miniature from the Illustrated Chronicle of Ivan the Terrible (16th century)
- Born: White Horde
- Died: 1419
- Spouse: Janika
- Dynasty: Manghits (by birth); Nogai (founder)
- Father: Kutlukiya
- Religion: Sunni Islam

Edigu (also Edigü, Edigey, Eðivkäy or Edege Mangit; died 1419) was a Turco-Mongol emir of the White Horde who founded a new political entity, which came to be known as the Nogai Horde. He was the leader of the eastern begs and became a dominant figure in the Golden Horde by the end of the 14th century.

== Early life ==
Edigu was from the Manghit tribe, the son of Kutlukiya (Kuttykiya), a Turco-Mongol noble who was defeated and killed by Khan Tokhtamysh of the Golden Horde in 1378. He gained fame as a highly successful general of Tokhtamysh before turning the arms against his master. By 1396, he was a sovereign ruler of a large area stretching between the Volga and Ural (known locally as Yayyk) rivers.

According to the Epic of Edigu, Edigu's paternal lineage is claimed to be traced back to the first caliph, Abu Bakr, through the legend of Baba Tükles, who was likely a great-grandfather of Edigu. According to the Tarikh-i Dost Sultan, written by Ötemish Hajji, Baba Tükles was identified as a Siddiqi and legendary Sufi saint of the Golden Horde. However, according to historian István Vásáry, this lineage was falsified for political legitimacy. The dubious nature and number of the names between Edigu and Baba Tukles support this view, as the fifteen-generation lineage claimed to go back to Abu Bakr stands out as a clear fabrication.

== Rise to power ==
The Golden Horde in 1389

In 1397, Edigu allied himself with Timur-Qutlugh and was appointed as general and commander-in-chief of the Golden Horde armies. In 1399, he inflicted a crushing defeat on Tokhtamysh and Vytautas of Lithuania at the Battle of the Vorskla River. Tokhtamysh definitively lost the throne and fled to Siberia. Thereupon Edigu managed to unite under his rule all Jochi's lands, albeit for the last time in history. Tokhtamysh never ceded his claim, and by 1405, Timur had agreed to support him again. After Timur's death the same year, Edigu's authority increased in the Mangyshlak Peninsula and the area south of the Aral Sea; he also took control of Khwarazm, which he ruled until 1412. He remained in control of the core territories of the Golden Horde and deposed Timur-Qutlugh, replacing him with a more loyal khan.

In 1406, Edigu located his old enemy Tokhtamysh in Siberia. Edigu's agents killed Tokhtamysh. The following year he raided Volga Bulgaria. In 1408, he staged a destructive Tatar invasion of Russia due to tribute not being paid in several decades, leading to Vasily I of Moscow to end his fighting against Lithuania. Edigu burned Nizhny Novgorod, Rostov, Serpukhov and other towns, and then laid siege to Moscow. Edigu summoned troops from Tver, but the prince made sure his soldiers would arrive too late to be of any use. Instead of taking Moscow, Edigu contented himself with extracting a ransom from its inhabitants before returning to the steppe.

Due to him being engaged in multiple conflicts, by 1412–1413, Edigu had lost control of Astrakhan, Bolghar, Crimea, and Sarai, leading him to seek refuge in Khwarezm and ally himself with the Timurid ruler Shah Rukh. Though he had previously had relations with Shah Rukh, including marrying his daughter to the latter's son, Muhammad Juki, Edigu lost a series of battles against Timur, son of Timur-Qutlugh, and Jalal al-Din, son of Tokhtamysh, leading Shah Rukh to expel him from Khwarazm. Within a few years, he controlled only the original Manghit homeland – an area consisting of the lower Ural River and the north-eastern shores of the Caspian Sea.

Despite this, Edigu was still militarily active and he managed to continuously ravage Kiev under Lithuanian rule; he was able to burn down the Pechersk Monastery and the old town in 1416, but was unable to capture its castle. In 1418, he offered Vytautas peace and alliance against Tokhtamysh's sons. He also sometimes controlled the regions of Derbent, Sarai, and Xacitarxan, as some coins that were minted bore his name.

In 1419, he was assassinated by one of Tokhtamysh's sons. Qadir Berdi, the last surviving son of Tokhtamysh, established himself in Crimea and managed to lead a campaign deep into Manghit territory, where he fought against Edigu and managed to kill him. Qadir Berdi was wounded and died shortly after. After his death, Edigu came to be regarded as the founder of the Manghit ulus, later known as the Nogai Horde. Edigu's dynasty in the Nogai Horde continued for about two centuries, until his last descendants moved to Moscow, where they were baptized and became known as Princes Urusov and Yusupov.

== Assessment ==
The Mamluk-era historian Al-Maqrizi describes him as being courageous, generous and someone "who loved Islamic scholars and sought to be close to the pious". He praises him for being a righteous Muslim who fasted and followed the laws of Islam. Al-Maqrizi also says that Edigu prohibited the Tatars from selling their sons and due to this not many of them were bought to the Mamluk territories of Egypt and Syria.

== Bibliography ==
- "Эдигей" . Brockhaus and Efron Encyclopedic Dictionary (in Russian). 1906.
- Crummey, Robert O. (6 June 2014). The Formation of Muscovy 1300 - 1613. Routledge. ISBN 978-1-317-87199-6.
- Favereau, Marie; Pochekaev, Roman Yu. (2023). "The Golden Horde, c. 1260–1502". The Cambridge History of the Mongol Empire. Cambridge University Press. pp. 243–318. ISBN 978-1-107-11648-1.
- Halperin, Charles J. (1987). Russia and the Golden Horde: The Mongol Impact on Medieval Russian History. Indiana University. p. 222. ISBN 9781850430575. (e-book).
- Shaikhutdinov, Marat (2021). Between East and West: The Formation of the Moscow State. Academic Studies Press. doi:10.2307/j.ctv249sgn2. ISBN 978-1-64469-713-9. JSTOR j.ctv249sgn2.
- Shehriyar, G. F. (2020), Epic of Edigu, p. 52
