= Tuqa-Timur =

Son of Jochi

- Died: after 1257
- Issue: Bay-Timur; Bayan; Urung-Timur; Kay-Timur
- Dynasty: Borjigin
- Father: Jochi
- Mother: Kaghri Khatun
- Religion: Islam

Tuqa-Temür (Note: Turki/Kypchak: توقا تیمور There are many variations of this name including: توقای تیمور, تغا تیمور, طغای تیمور) (also Toqa-Temür and Toghai-Temür, in the Perso-Arabic orthography of the sources rendered Tūqā-Tīmūr or Tūqāy-Tīmūr) was the thirteenth and youngest or penultimate son of Jochi, the eldest son of Genghis Khan. He was a younger brother of Batu Khan and Berke Khan, the rulers of what came to be known as the Golden Horde.

== Career ==
Tuqa-Timur's mother is identified as Jochi's concubine Kaghri Khatun (Kaghrī Khātūn), a woman from the Merkit tribe. As Jochi's apparently youngest son of standing or significance, Tuqa-Timur was perhaps deemed too young to attend the qurultai for the proclamation and enthronement of the great khan Ögedei in 1229. Instead, Tuqa-Timur remained behind in his father's ulus, apparently governing it during the absence of his older brothers at the assembly. When Batu Khan returned, Tuqa-Timur organized a three-day feast in his honor.

Tuqa-Timur subsequently received an ulus of his own from Batu, somewhere within the Left Wing (i.e., eastern portion) of Batu's possessions, that is to say east of the Ural Mountains and Ural River, and perhaps under the intermediate authority of another brother, Orda. Tuqa-Timur participated in Batu's Western Campaign, but does not seem to have played a very distinguished role in it; he is also credited with a leading role in campaigns against the Bashkirs and Alans. He was among the Jochid princes participating in the qurultai at which the great khan Güyük was formally proclaimed and enthroned, in 1246, Batu having refused to attend. After Batu's quriltai that resulted in the proclamation of Möngke as great khan in 1250, Berke and Tuqa-Timur escorted Möngke to Mongolia with an army, and were generously rewarded by the new great khan for their support. Tuqa-Timur appears to have survived Batu and to have died some time after Berke's accession as khan of the Golden Horde in 1257; it is presumed that he was already dead by 1267, when his son Urung-Timur received lands from the new khan Mengu-Timur. The Mongol prince ("tsarevich") Toktemir, who attacked Tver' in Russia in 1294/1295, is a distinct individual, bearing the same or similar name.

Following the example of his older brother Berke, Tuqa-Timur converted to Islam, sometime after Berke's conversion in 1251–1252. Unlike his brothers Batu, Orda, and Shiban, Tuqa-Timur does not appear to have headed an autonomous and lasting territorial polity, something brought up as a negative comparison in disputes between his descendants and those of Shiban in the late 14th century; the Shibanids argued that this made the Tuqa-Timurids substantially inferior. Some of Tuqa-Timur's descendants appear to have remained in the Left Wing (eastern portion) of the Golden Horde, while others were settled in the Right Wing (western portion) when Khan Mengu-Timur gave the Crimea to Tuqa-Timur's son Urung-Timur.

== Family ==
Rashīd ad-Dīn Faḍlallāh and the genealogical compendium Muʿizz al-ansāb attribute four sons to Tuqa-Timur as follows:

- Bāy-Tīmūr
- Bāyān
- Ūrungbāš or Ūrung-Tīmūr (also Ürüng-Temür, sometimes conflated with Ūz-Tīmūr)
- Kay-Tīmūr (also Ked-Temür, elsewhere Ūz-Tīmūr)

== Descendants ==
Apart from his involvement in the affairs of the Golden Horde and his actions as representative of his older brothers, Tuqa-Timur is important as the progenitor of some of the most prolific and historically significant lines of Jochid and Chinggisid descent. From the 1360s, Tuqa-Timur's descendants vied with those of his brother Shiban for possession of the throne of the Golden Horde, starting with the probable Tuqa-Timurid Ordu Malik, who overthrew the Shibanid Timur Khwaja in 1361. A Crimean branch of Tuqa-Timur's descendants furnished the beglerbeg Mamai with a succession of three puppet khans in 1361–1380. Several families descended from Tuqa-Timur ensconced themselves in the former Ulus of Jochi's eldest son Orda in the east, under Qara Noqai in 1360, then Urus Khan in 1369, and finally Tokhtamysh in 1379. The descendants of Urus and Tokhtamysh subsequently disputed possession of the Golden Horde mostly among themselves. Among the successor states of the Golden Horde, the khanates of Kasimov, Kazan, Astrakhan, and the Crimea were all founded by princes descended from Tuqa-Timur. This was also the case with the Kazakh Khanate and, after 1599, the Khanate of Bukhara in Central Asia.

Reigning Descendants of Tuqa-Timur
- Tūqā-Tīmūr (d. after 1257), son of Jöchi, son of Chinggis Khān
  - Bāy-Timur (Note: Počekaev 2010: 372 conflates him with his brother Bāyān and gives their descendants jointly.)
    - Tūqānchar
      - Sāsī
        - Qarā Nūqāy of the Ulus of Orda 1360–1363 (Note: Gaev 2002: 52; Sabitov 2008: 286; Počekaev 2010: 372.)
        - Būchqāq
          - Tughluq-Tīmūr of the Ulus of Orda 1363–? (Note: Gaev 2002: 53; Sabitov 2008: 286.)
        - Qutluq-Khwāja of the Ulus of Orda 1369 (Note: Gaev 2002: 52; Sabitov 2008: 286.)
      - Būrqūlāq
        - Mubārak-Khwāja of the Ulus of Orda ?–1369 , (Note: Gaev 2002: 53; Vásáry 2009; correcting the long-held view that this khan was a descendant of Orda Khan, as in, e.g., Howorth 1880: 221 and Stokvis 1888: Chapter 9 Table 7.)
  - Bāyān (Note: Počekaev 2010: 372 conflates him with his brother Bāy-Timur and gives their descendants jointly.)
    - Dānishmand
      - Īl-Tūtār
        - Ūrdū-Malik of the Golden Horde 1361, (Note: Gaev 2002: 53; Počekaev 2010: 372.)
      - Beg-Tūt
        - Beg-Ṣūfī = ? Beg-Ṣūfī claimant in Crimea 1419–1421 (identification disputed) (Note: Identification preferred by Sabitov 2008: 288, 295, and Sabitov 2014, but rejected by others (e.g., Parunin 2016, Sidorenko 2016) on chronological grounds.)
          - Sayyid-Aḥmad II claimant in Crimea 1432–1437, Podolia 1433–1452 (d. 1465?) (identification disputed) (Note: Sabitov 2014, noting this Sayyid-Aḥmad's patronym Beksubovič in Polish-Lithuanian sources. Počekaev 2010: 205, identifies this Sayyid-Aḥmad as the son of Karīm-Bīrdī.)
  - Ūrung-Tīmūr (Ūrungbāsh, sometimes conflated with Ūz-Tīmūr) (Note: Welsford 2013: 50, 52-53, identifies Ūz-Tīmūr with his brother Kay-Tīmūr.)
    - Achiq
      - Tāqtaq (Note: Welsford 2013: 53, gives the name as Bādābūk.)
        - Tīmūr-Khwāja
          - Bādiq
            - Urūs of the Ulus of Orda 1369–1377, of the Golden Horde 1373, 1374–1375 (Note: Gaev 2002: 53; Sabitov 2008: 286; Počekaev 2010: 372; correcting the long-held view that this khan was a descendant of Orda Khan, as in, e.g., Howorth 1880: 221 and Stokvis 1888: Chapter 9 Table 7.)
              - Qutlū-Būqā of the Ulus of Orda 1374–1375 (Note: Gaev 2002: 53; Počekaev 2010: 372.)
              - Tūqtāqiyā of the Ulus of Orda 1377 (Note: Howorth 1880: 224; Gaev 2002: 53; Sabitov 2008: 286; Počekaev 2010: 372.)
                - Beg-Pūlād claimant in Crimea 1391–1392
                - Anīka-Pūlād
                  - Aḥmad Girāy of the Kazakhs 1470–? (Note: Gaev 2002: 53; Sabitov 2008: 305; Počekaev 2010: 372; Howorth 1880: 685 and Stokvis 1888: Chapter 9 Table 7, erroneously make him a son of Barāq.)
                    - Burundūq of the Kazakhs ?–1513 (Note: Howorth 1880: 685; Gaev 2002: 53; Sabitov 2008: 305.)
              - Tīmūr-Malik of the Ulus of Orda 1377–1379 (Note: Howorth 1880: 224; Gaev 2002: 53; Sabitov 2008: 286; Počekaev 2010: 372.)
              - Qūyūrchuq of the Golden Horde 1395–1397
                - Barāq of the Ulus of Orda 1419–1421; of Sibir 1421–1426; of the Golden Horde 1423–1428 (Note: Howorth 1880: 291; Gaev 2002: 53; Sabitov 2008: 287; Počekaev 2010: 372.)
                  - Jānī-Beg Abū-Saʿīd of the Kazakhs 1470–after 1490 (the listing of his ruling descendants is selective and incomplete) (Note: Howorth 1880: 685; Gaev 2002: 53; Sabitov 2008: 305; Počekaev 2010: 372. For fuller treatment of his descendants, the Kazakh khans and princes, see Sabitov 2008.)
                    - Qāsim of the Kazakhs 1513–1521 (Note: Howorth 1880: 685; Sabitov 2008: 305.)
                      - Ḥaqq-Nazar of the Kazakhs 1559–1580 (Note: Howorth 1880: 685; Sabitov 2008: 305.)
                        - Dīn-Muḥammad (Tīnīm) of Tashkent (d. 1603) (Note: Sabitov 2008: 306.)
                      - Muḥammad (Mamāsh) of the Kazakhs 1521–1522 (Note: Sabitov 2008: 305; Howorth 1880: 685 and Stokvis 1888: Chapter 9 Table 7, erroneously make him a son of Adīk.)
                    - Adīk
                      - Ṭāhir of the Kazakhs 1522–1532 (Note: Howorth 1880: 685; Sabitov 2008: 305.)
                      - Būydāsh of the Kazakhs 1532–1559 (Note: Sabitov 2008: 305.)
                      - Khwāja-Muḥammad (Qujāsh) Kazakh claimant 1535 (Note: Sabitov 2008: 305.)
                    - Usāq
                      - Pūlād Kazakh claimant 1537
                    - Ūsāk
                      - Būlākāy
                        - Bahādur of the Kazakhs 1652–1680
                        - Aychuwāq
                          - Irīsh
                            - Khwāja-Sulṭān (Note: Sabitov 2008: 227.)
                              - Abu'l-Khayr Muḥammad of the Kazakh Lesser Jüz 1718–1748 (Note: Howorth 1880: 685; Sabitov 2008: 310.)
                                - Nūr-ʿAlī of the Kazakh Lesser Jüz 1748–1786, previously 42nd khan of Khwarazm 1742 (d. 1790) (Note: Howorth 1880: 685; Sabitov 2008: 310.; Tabuldin 2022: 174.)
                                  - Orman (Urman) Sultan, member of the Khan’s council (d. 1813). For the murder of Khan Jantöre and participation in the rebellion of Khan Karatai, he was, according to one version, exiled to eastern Siberia; according to another, sent to the Peter and Paul Fortress, where he died in 1813 (Note: Tabuldin 2022: 174.)
                                    - Sukur (Shukurali) Sultan (Note: Tabuldin 2022: 174.)
                                      - Shora Sultan – participated in his uncle’s, Sultan Kusepgali’s, national rebellion against the colonial policy of Russia in the years 1868–1870, for which he was exiled to the Ukraine. He returned before the Revolution and was recorded as being older than fifty years of age in a national census in 1923 (Note: Tabuldin 2022: 174.)
                                        - Sultan Ishangali (Ishan) Shorayev (Shurayev) (1903–1943) – fought and died in the Battle of Kursk (Note: Tabuldin 2022: 174.)
                                          - Askar Ishanovich Shurayev (Askar Ishanuly Shora) – well-known athlete (b. 1941), Honorary Coach of the Republic of Kazakhstan (2011) awarded the medal For Contribution to the Development of Physical Culture and Sport (2014). Honorary citizen of Akzhayik District (2014) also awarded the commemorative medals 25 Years of Independence of the Republic of Kazakhstan (2016) and For Labour Valour (2021) (Note: Tabuldin 2022: 174.)
                                            - Alfiya Askar Abulkhair (b. 1963) – one of Kazakhstan’s foremost businesspeople; resident in the United Kingdom where she is a patron and member of the board of directors of the Royal Opera House as well as patron of the British Academy of Film and Television Arts (Note: Tabuldin 2022: 174.)
                                              - Mansour Timur Askar (b. 2004) – educated at Wellington College, including Combined Cadet Force training, and Christ Church, Oxford (Note: Tabuldin 2022: 174.)
                                              - Iskander Timur Askar (b. 2006) – educated at Wellington College, including Combined Cadet Force training, and University College London (Note: Tabuldin 2022: 174.)
                                  - Pīr-ʿAlī claimant 1770–1805 (Note: Howorth 1880: 685; Sabitov 2008: 310.)
                                    - Īsh-Muḥammad (Īshīm) of the Kazakh Lesser Jüz 1794–1797 (Note: Howorth 1880: 685; Sabitov 2008: 310.)
                                    - Būkāy of the Kazakh Inner Jüz 1801–1815 (Note: Howorth 1880: 685; Sabitov 2008: 311.)
                                      - Jahāngīr Girāy of the Kazakh Inner Jüz 1823–1845 (Note: Howorth 1880: 685; Sabitov 2008: 311.)
                                        - Ṣāḥib Girāy of the Kazakh Inner Jüz 1845–1847 (Note: Howorth 1880: 685; Sabitov 2008: 311.)
                                    - Shighāy of the Kazakh Inner Jüz 1815–1823 (Note: Sabitov 2008: 311.)
                                  - Yār-Muḥammad of the Kazakh Lesser Jüz 1786–1790
                                  - Īr-ʿAlī of the Kazakh Lesser Jüz 1791–1794 (Note: Howorth 1880: 685; Sabitov 2008: 310.)
                                    - Būlākāy, 52nd khan of Khwarazm 1770; rival khan of the Kazakh Lesser Jüz 1797–1809 (Note: Sabitov 2008: 305.)
                                  - ʿĀdil-Sulṭān (Note: Sabitov 2008: 305.)
                                    - Aqīm, 53rd and 57th khan of Khwarazm 1770–1772 and 1773–1774 (d. after 1790) (Note: Sabitov 2008: 305.)
                                    - Tugīn (Note: Sabitov 2008: 233.)
                                      - Yādigār, 58th, 60th, and 62nd khan of Khwarazm 1774–1775, 1779–1781, and 1783–1790 (d. before 1803) (Note: Sabitov 2008: 233.)
                                        - Abū'l-Ghāzī V, 64th and 66th khan of Khwarazm 1802–1804 and 1806 (d. 1815?)
                                  - Aychuwāq of the Kazakh Lesser Jüz 1797–1805 (d. 1810) (Note: Howorth 1880: 685; Sabitov 2008: 310.)
                                    - Jān-Tūra of the Kazakh Lesser Jüz 1805–1809 (Note: Howorth 1880: 685; Sabitov 2008: 310.)
                                      - Shīr-Ghāzī of the Kazakh Lesser Jüz 1809–1824 (d. 1845) (Note: Sabitov 2008: 310; Howorth 1880: 685 and Stokvis 1888: Chapter 9 Table 7, erroneously make him a son of Aychuwāq.)
                              - Tūqtāmish (Note: Sabitov 2008: 227.)
                                - Sarī-Aygīr (Mamāy), 38th khan of Khwarazm 1727 (Note: Sabitov 2008: 227.)
                    - Jādik
                      - Tūgum Kazakh claimant 1552–1556 (Note: Sabitov 2008: 305.)
                      - Shighāy of the Kazakhs 1580–1582 (Note: Sabitov 2008: 311.)
                        - Andān-Sulṭān
                          - Abūlī of Tashkent (d. 1650) (Note: Sabitov 2008: 307.)
                          - Uraz-Muḥammad of Kasimov 1600–1611
                          - Kīchīk-Sulṭān
                            - Būkāy
                              - Khudāmanda
                                - Tursūn I of Tashkent (d.1717) (Note: Sabitov 2008: 307.)
                                  - Kīchīk-Sulṭān of the Kazakh Middle Jüz 1748–1750 (Note: Sabitov 2008: 309.)
                                  - Sulṭān-Barāq of the Kazakh Middle Jüz 1748–1750 (Note: Sabitov 2008: 309.)
                                    - Nūr-ʿAlī II, 50th khan of Khwarazm 1768–1769 (Note: Sabitov 2008: 305.)
                        - Tawakkul (Tawka) of the Kazakhs 1582–1598 (Note: Sabitov 2008: 305.)
                        - Amān-Būlān
                          - Bahādur
                            - Tursūn II of Tashkent (d. 1720) (Note: Sabitov 2008: 307.)
                              - Yulbārs of Tashkent and the Kazakh Greater Jüz 1720–1740 (Note: Sabitov 2008: 307.)
                        - Īsh-Muḥammad (Īshīm) of the Kazakhs 1598–1613, 1627–1628 (Note: Howorth 1880: 685; Sabitov 2008: 307, 309.)
                          - Khudābanda
                            - Sīrdāq
                              - Khusraw
                                - Qayʾip of the Kazakhs 1715–1718 (Note: Howorth 1880: 685; Sabitov 2008: 309.)
                                  - Bahādur Jānī-Beg, 39th khan of Khwarazm 1727–1728, rival khan of the Kazakh Lesser Jüz 1748–1771 (Note: Sabitov 2008: 147, 304.)
                                    - Qayʾip, 44th khan of Khwarazm 1747–1757, rival khan of the Kazakh Lesser Jüz 1786–1791 (Note: Sabitov 2008: 147, 304.)
                                      - Jahāngīr, 51st khan of Khwarazm 1769–1770 (Note: Sabitov 2008: 305.)
                                      - ʿAbd-al-ʿAzīz, 54th khan of Khwarazm 1771–1772 (d. 1815?)
                                      - Abū'l-Fayḍ, 59th khan of Khwarazm 1775–1779
                                    - Qarā-Biy (ʿAbd-Allāh), 45th and 56th khan of Khwarazm 1757, 1773 (d. after 1810) (Note: Sabitov 2008: 147, 304.)
                                      - Abū'l-Ghāzī IV, 63rd khan of Khwarazm 1790–1802 (d. before 1806) (Note: Sabitov 2008: 187.)
                                    - (?) Khudāyār
                                      - Tawakkul (Ḫudāydād), 47th khan of Khwarazm 1763–1764 (Note: Sabitov 2008: 304.)
                          - Jānī-Beg of the Kazakhs 1628–1644 (Note: Sabitov 2008: 309; omitted by Howorth 1880: 685 and Stokvis 1888: Chapter 9 Table 7.)
                          - Jahāngīr of the Kazakhs 1644–1652 (Note: Howorth 1880: 685; Sabitov 2008: 309.)
                            - Tawakkul-Muḥammad (Tawka) of the Kazakhs 1652–1715 (Note: Howorth 1880: 685; Sabitov 2008: 309.)
                              - Pūlād of the Kazakhs 1718-1729 (Note: Howorth 1880: 685; Sabitov 2008: 309.)
                                - Abu'l-Muḥammad of the Kazakh Middle Jüz by 1737–1748, 1750–1771 (Note: Howorth 1880: 685; Sabitov 2008: 309.)
                              - Shāh-Muḥammad (Sameke) of the Kazakh Middle Jüz 1719–after 1734 (1737?) (Note: Sabitov 2008: 309.)
                            - Walī (Note: Sabitov 2008: 145.)
                              - Abūlī (Note: Sabitov 2008: 145.)
                                - Īsh-Muḥammad (Īshīm), 36th khan of Khwarazm 1714 (?) (Note: Sabitov 2008: 145, but at 97-98 identified as a Shibanid, descended from the khans of Sibir.)
                                - Jahāngīr of Tashkent (d. after 1717) (Note: Sabitov 2008: 307.)
                                - Walī (Note: Sabitov 2008: 145.)
                                  - Abu'l-Manṣūr Abūlī (Ablai) of the Kazakh Middle Jüz 1771–1781 (Note: Howorth 1880: 685; Sabitov 2008: 309.)
                                    - ʿAbdallāh of the Kazakh Middle Jüz 1781–1782 (Note: Sabitov 2008: 217.)
                                    - Walī of the Kazakh Middle Jüz 1782–1821 (Note: Howorth 1880: 685; Sabitov 2008: 200, 309.)
                                      - ʿUbaydallāh of the Kazakh Middle Jüz 1821–1824 (d. 1852) (Note: Sabitov 2008: 200.)
                                    - Qāsim (Note: Sabitov 2008: 218.)
                                      - Kanāshīrīn (Kenesary Qasymuly) (died 1847) (Note: Sabitov 2008: 220, 310.)
    - Sārīcha
      - Kuyunchak
        - Qutluq-Khwāja
          - Tuy-Khwāja (Note: Howorth 1880: 225; Gaev 2002: 53; Počekaev 2010: 372; Welsford 2013: 53, makes him the son of Tūluk-Tīmūr, here given as his brother; correcting the long-held view that this khan was a descendant of Orda Khan, as in, e.g., Stokvis 1888: Chapter 9 Table 7.)
            - Tūqtāmīš of the Ulus of Orda 1379–, of the Golden Horde 1380–1395, 1398, of Sibir 1399–1406Tursūn II of Tashkent (d. 1720) (Note: Howorth 1880: 226; Gaev 2002: 53; Počekaev 2010: 372.)
              - Jalāl ad-Dīn of the Golden Horde 1411–1412 (Note: Howorth 1880: 269; Gaev 2002: 53; Sabitov 2008: 287; Počekaev 2010: 372.)
                - ? Beg-Ṣūfī claimant in Crimea 1419–1421 (identification disputed) (Note: Proposed by Sidorenko 2016: 66.)
                  - Sayyid-Aḥmad II claimant in Crimea 1432–1437, Podolia 1433–1452 (d. 1465?) (identification disputed) (Note: Sabitov 2014, noting this Sayyid-Aḥmad's patronym Beksubovič in Polish-Lithuanian sources; Počekaev 2010: 205, identifies this Sayyid-Aḥmad as the son of Karīm-Bīrdī.)
              - Karīm-Bīrdī of the Golden Horde 1409, 1412–1413, 1414–1415 (d. 1417?) (Note: Howorth 1880: 270; Gaev 2002: 53; Sabitov 2008: 287; Počekaev 2010: 372.)
                - Sayyid-Aḥmad I of the Golden Horde 1416 (disputed identification) (Note: Preferred by Sabitov 2008: 56, 295; Počekaev 2010: 205, identifies this Sayyid-Aḥmad with Sayyid-Aḥmad II, who ruled in 1432–1452 (but the latter bears the patronym Beksubovič: Sabitov 2014), while making the Sayyid-Aḥmad of 1416 the son of Mamkī: Počekaev 2010: 194.)
              - Kibak of the Golden Horde 1413–1414 (Note: Howorth 1880: 270; Gaev 2002: 53; Sabitov 2008: 287; Počekaev 2010: 372.)
              - Jabbār-Bīrdī of the Golden Horde 1414–1415, 1416–1417 (Note: Howorth 1880: 270; Gaev 2002: 53; Sabitov 2008: 287; Počekaev 2010: 372.)
              - Qādir-Bīrdī of the Golden Horde 1419–1420 (Note: Howorth 1880: 274; Gaev 2002: 53; Sabitov 2008: 287; Počekaev 2010: 372.)
              - Kūchuk-Muḥammad claimant in Crimea 1421 (Note: Gaev 2002: 54.)
        - Tūlāk-Tīmūr
          - Janis (Note: Gaev 2002: 54; Počekaev 2010: 372; Welsford 2013: 53, gives the name as Habīnah.)
            - Tāsh-Tīmūr claimant in Crimea 1395–1396 (d. after 1404) (Note: Gaev 2002: 54; Sabitov 2008: 286, 295; Počekaev 2010: 372.)
              - Ghiyāth ad-Dīn I of the Golden Horde 1416 (Note: Gaev 2002: 54; Počekaev 2010: 372.)
                - Ḥājjī Girāy I of Crimea 1433–1434, 1443–1444, 1449–1466 (Note: Gaev 2002: 54; Sabitov 2008: 296; Počekaev 2010: 372.)
                  - Ḥaydar Girāy of Crimea 1456 (Note: Gaev 2002: 53; Sabitov 2008: 296.)
                  - Nūr-Dawlat Girāy of Crimea 1466–1467, 1474–1475, 1476–1478; of Kasimov 1486–1490 (d. 1503) (Note: Howorth 1880: 452; Gaev 2002: 54; Sabitov 2008: 292, 296; Počekaev 2010: 372.)
                    - Satīlghan Girāy of Kasimov 1490–1506 (Note: Sabitov 2008: 293.)
                    - Jānay Girāy of Kasimov 1506–1512 (Note: Sabitov 2008: 293.)
                  - Manglī Girāy I of Crimea 1467–1474, 1475–1476, 1478–1514 (Note: Howorth 1880: 452; Gaev 2002: 54; Sabitov 2008: 296; Počekaev 2010: 372.)
                    - Muḥammad Girāy I of Crimea 1514–1523 (Note: Howorth 1880: 468; Sabitov 2008: 296; Počekaev 2010: 372.)
                      - Ghāzī Girāy I of Crimea 1523–1524 (Note: Howorth 1880: 477; Sabitov 2008: 296.)
                      - Bahādur Girāy of Astrakhan 1523 (Note: Sabitov 2008: 294.)
                    - Saʿādat Girāy I of Crimea 1524–1531 (d. 1539) (Note: Howorth 1880: 477; Sabitov 2008: 296; Počekaev 2010: 372.)
                    - Islām Girāy I of Astrakhan 1531–1532; of Crimea 1532 (d. 1537) (Note: oworth 1880: 477; Sabitov 2008: 294, 296.)
                    - Ṣāḥib Girāy I of Kazan 1521–1524; of Crimea 1532–1551 (Note: Howorth 1880: 477; Sabitov 2008: 292, 296.)
                    - Maḥmūd Girāy (Note: Sabitov 2008: 292, who refers to him as Fatḥ Girāy.)
                      - Ṣafāʾ Girāy of Kazan 1524–1531, 1533–1546, 1546–1549 (Note: Sabitov 2008: 292.)
                        - Ūtamīš Girāy of Kazan 1549–1551 (Note: Sabitov 2008: 292.)
                    - Mubārak Girāy (Note: Sabitov 2008: 296.)
                      - Dawlat Girāy I of Crimea 1551–1577 (d. 1720) (Note: Howorth 1880: 488; Sabitov 2008: 296.)
                        - Muḥammad Girāy II of Crimea 1577–1584 (Note: Howorth 1880: 512; Sabitov 2008: 296.)
                          - Saʿādat Girāy II of Crimea 1584 (d. 1587) (Note: Sabitov 2008: 296.)
                            - Muḥammad Girāy III of Crimea 1610, 1623–1624, 1624–1627 (d. 1629) (Note: Sabitov 2008: 297; erroneously, Howorth 1880: 540, conflates him with Muḥammad Girāy II, while Stokvis 1888: chapter 9, table 7, makes him Muḥammad Girāy II's son.)
                      - Islām Girāy II of Crimea 1584, 1584–1588 (Note: Howorth 1880: 519; Sabitov 2008: 296.)
                      - Ghāzī Girāy II of Crimea 1588–1596, 1596–1608 (Note: Howorth 1880: 523; Sabitov 2008: 297.)
                        - Tūqtāmīš Girāy of Crimea 1608 (Note: Howorth 1880: 538; Sabitov 2008: 297.)
                        - ʿInāyat Girāy of Crimea 1635–1637 (Note: Howorth 1880: 543; Sabitov 2008: 297.)
                      - Fatḥ Girāy I of Crimea 1596 (Note: Howorth 1880: 528; Sabitov 2008: 297.)
                        - Dawlat Girāy (Note: Sabitov 2008: 297.)
                          - ʿĀdil Girāy of Crimea 1666–1671 (Note: Sabitov 2008: 297.)
                      - Salāmat Girāy I of Crimea 1608–1610 (Note: Howorth 1880: 538; Sabitov 2008: 297.)
                        - Bahādur Girāy I of Crimea 1637–1641 (Note: Howorth 1880: 545; Sabitov 2008: 297.)
                          - Salīm Girāy I of Crimea 1671–1678, 1684–1691, 1692–1699, 1702–1704 (Note: Howorth 1880: 559; Sabitov 2008: 297.)
                            - Dawlat Girāy II of Crimea 1688–1702, 1708–1713 (d. 1725) (Note: Howorth 1880: 568; Sabitov 2008: 297.)
                              - Fatḥ Girāy II of Crimea 1736–1737 (d. 1746) (Note: Howorth 1880: 579; Sabitov 2008: 298.)
                                - Salīm Girāy III of Crimea 1764–1767, 1770–1771 (d. 1786) (Note: Howorth 1880: 585; Sabitov 2008: 298.)
                              - Arslān Girāy of Crimea 1748–1756, 1767 (Note: Howorth 1880: 582; Sabitov 2008: 298.)
                                - Dawlat Girāy IV of Crimea 1769–1770, 1775–1777 (d. 1781) (Note: Sabitov 2008: 298.)
                                  - Salīm Girāy
                                    - Salīm Girāy
                                      - Azamat Girāy
                                        - Qādir Girāy (d. 1953)
                                          - Azamat Girāy (d. 2001) (Note: Sabitov 2008: 299.)
                                            - Qādir Girāy (b. 1961)
                                - Shāhbāz Girāy of Bujaq 1787–1789 (d. 1793) (Note: Sabitov 2008: 307.)
                              - Qīrīm Girāy of Crimea 1758–1764, 1768–1769 (Note: Howorth 1880: 584; Sabitov 2008: 298.)
                                - Bakht Girāy of Bujaq 1789–1792 (d. 1801) (Note: Sabitov 2008: 299.)
                              - Aḥmad Girāy (Note: Sabitov 2008: 298.)
                                - Ṣāḥib Girāy II of Crimea 1772–1775 (d. 1807) (Note: Howorth 1880: 597; Sabitov 2008: 298.)
                                - Shāhīn Girāy of Crimea 1777–1782, 1783 (d. 1787) (Note: Howorth 1880: 597; Sabitov 2008: 298.)
                                - Bahādur Girāy II of Crimea 1782–1783; of Bujaq 1783–1787 (d. 1792) (Note: Sabitov 2008: 298.)
                            - Ghāzī Girāy III of Crimea 1704–1707 (d. 1708) (Note: Howorth 1880: 571; Sabitov 2008: 297.)
                            - Qaplān Girāy I of Crimea 1707–1708, 1713–1716, 1730–1736 (d. 1738) (Note: Howorth 1880: 571; Sabitov 2008: 298.)
                              - Salīm Girāy II of Crimea 1743–1748 (Note: Sabitov 2008: 298.)
                                - Qaplān Girāy II of Crimea 1770 (d. 1771) (Note: Howorth 1880: 595; Sabitov 2008: 298.)
                            - Saʿādat Girāy IV of Crimea 1717–1724 (d. 1732) (Note: Howorth 1880: 575; Sabitov 2008: 298.)
                              - Ḥalīm Girāy of Crimea 1756–1758 (d. 1759) (Note: Sabitov 2008: 298.)
                            - Manglī Girāy II of Crimea 1724–1730, 1737–1739 (Note: Howorth 1880: 576; Sabitov 2008: 298.)
                            - Salāmat Girāy II of Crimea 1740–1743 (d. 1751) (Note: Sabitov 2008: 298.)
                              - Maqṣūd Girāy of Crimea 1767–1768, 1771–1772 (d. 1781) (Note: Howorth 1880: 585; Sabitov 2008: 298.)
                        - Muḥammad Girāy IV of Crimea 1641–1644, 1654–1666 (Note: Howorth 1880: 546; Sabitov 2008: 297.)
                        - Islām Girāy III of Crimea 1644–1654 (Note: Howorth 1880: 547; Sabitov 2008: 297.)
                        - Mubārak Girāy (Note: Sabitov 2008: 297.)
                          - Murād Girāy of Crimea 1678–1683 (Note: Howorth 1880: 562; Sabitov 2008: 297.)
                        - Qīrīm Girāy (Note: Sabitov 2008: 297.)
                          - Ḥājjī Girāy II of Crimea 1683–1684 (Note: Howorth 1880: 563; Sabitov 2008: 297.)
                          - Saʿādat Girāy III of Crimea 1691 (Note: Howorth 1880: 565; Sabitov 2008: 297.)
                        - Ṣafāʾ Girāy (Note: Sabitov 2008: 297.)
                          - Ṣafāʾ Girāy of Crimea 1691–1692 (Note: Howorth 1880: 565; Sabitov 2008: 297.)
                        - ʿĀdil Girāy (Note: Sabitov 2008: 298; Howorth 1880: 558, doubts this descent.)
                          - Dawlat Girāy III of Crimea 1716 (Note: Howorth 1880: 575; Sabitov 2008: 298.)
                      - Mubārak Girāy (Note: Sabitov 2008: 297.)
                        - Jānī-Beg Girāy of Crimea 1610–1623, 1624, 1627–1635 (Note: Howorth 1880: 538; Sabitov 2008: 297.)
              - ? Beg-Ṣūfī claimant in Crimea 1419–1421 (identification disputed) (Note: Proposed by Parunin 2016: 159-168.)
                - Sayyid-Aḥmad II claimant in Crimea 1432–1437, Podolia 1433–1452 (d. 1465?) (Note: Sabitov 2014, noting this Sayyid-Aḥmad's patronym Beksubovič in Polish-Lithuanian sources; Počekaev 2010: 205, identifies this Sayyid-Aḥmad as the son of Karīm-Bīrdī.)
              - Dawlat-Bīrdī of the Golden Horde 1428; claimant in Crimea 1421-1428 (Note: Gaev 2002: 54; Sabitov 2008: 288, 295; Počekaev 2010: 372.)
            - ʿAlī
              - Khudādād of the Golden Horde 1422–1425 (Note: Gaev 2002: 54; Sabitov 2008: 288; Počekaev 2010: 372.)
            - Ḥasan
              - Ulugh Muḥammad of the Golden Horde 1430–1437; of Kazan 1437–1446 (Note: Gaev 2002: 54; Sabitov 2008: 291, 295; Počekaev 2010: 372.)
                - Maḥmūd (Maḥmūdāq) of Kazan 1446–1462 (Note: Gaev 2002: 54; Počekaev 2010: 372.)
                  - Khalīl of Kazan 1462–1467 (Note: Howorth 1880: 447; Gaev 2002: 54; Sabitov 2008: 291.)
                  - Ibrāhīm of Kazan 1467–1479 (Note: Howorth 1880: 447; Gaev 2002: 54; Sabitov 2008: 291; Počekaev 2010: 372.)
                    - ʿAlī (Ilhām) of Kazan 1479–1484, 1485–1487 (d. 1490) (Note: Howorth 1880: 447; Gaev 2002: 54; Sabitov 2008: 292; Počekaev 2010: 372.)
                    - Muḥammad-Amīn of Kazan 1484–1485, 1487–1495, 1502–1518 (Note: Howorth 1880: 447; Gaev 2002: 54; Sabitov 2008: 292; Počekaev 2010: 372.)
                    - ʿAbd al-Laṭīf of Kazan 1496–1502 (d. 1517) (Note: Howorth 1880: 447; Gaev 2002: 54; Sabitov 2008: 292; Počekaev 2010: 372.)
                    - Gawhar Shād, female regent of Kazan 1531–1533 (Note: Sabitov 2008: 292.)
                - Qāsim of Kasimov 1452–1469 (Note: Howorth 1880: 447; Gaev 2002: 54; Sabitov 2008: 292; Počekaev 2010: 372.)
                  - Dāniyār of Kasimov 1469–1486 (Note: Howorth 1880: 447; Sabitov 2008: 292; Počekaev 2010: 372.)
                - Yaʿqūb, possibly ruled in Kasimov 1469–1471 (Note: Howorth 1880: 447; Gaev 2002: 54; Sabitov 2008: 292.)
  - Kay-Tīmūr (Ūz-Tīmūr), son of Tūqā-Tīmūr
    - Abāy
      - Nūmqān (Note: Welsford 2013: 53, gives the name as Tumghān.)
        - Qutluq-Tīmūr = ? Qutluq-Tīmūr named as rival of ʿAbdallāh Khan in 1361 by Ibn Khaldun (Note: Sabitov 2008: 284.)
          - Tīmūr-Beg = ? Ūljāy-Tīmūr of the Golden Horde 1368 (d. 1369) (Note: Gaev 2002: 54; Sabitov 2008: 286; Počekaev 2010: 372; Howorth 1880: 259 and Stokvis 1888: chapter 9 table 7 make him erroneously son of Urus' son Tīmūr-Malik.)
            - Tīmūr-Qutluq of the Golden Horde 1397–1398, 1398–1399 (Note: Gaev 2002: 54; Sabitov 2008: 286; Počekaev 2010: 372; Howorth 1880: 259 and Stokvis 1888: chapter 9 table 7 make him erroneously son of Urus' son Tīmūr-Malik.)
              - Pūlād of the Golden Horde 1406–1409, 1409–1410 (Note: Gaev 2002: 54; Sabitov 2008: 286; Počekaev 2010: 372; Howorth 1880: 265-266 and Stokvis 1888: chapter 9 table 7 make him erroneously a brother of Shādī-Beg.)
              - Tīmūr of the Golden Horde 1410–1412 (Note: Gaev 2002: 54; Sabitov 2008: 286; Počekaev 2010: 372.)
                - Kīchīk Muḥammad of the Golden Horde 1434–1459 (Note: Gaev 2002: 55; Sabitov 2008: 288, 295; Počekaev 2010: 372.)
                  - Maḥmūd of the Golden Horde 1459–1465; of Astrakhan 1465–1471 (Note: Howorth 1880: 362; Gaev 2002: 55; Sabitov 2008: 288; Počekaev 2010: 372.)
                    - Qāsim I of Astrakhan 1471–1481 (Note: Howorth 1880: 362; Gaev 2002: 55; Sabitov 2008: 293; Počekaev 2010: 372.)
                    - ʿAbd al-Karīm of the Golden Horde 1481–1491; of Astrakhan 1481–1485, 1491–1493, 1494–1514 (Note: Howorth 1880: 362; Sabitov 2008: 294; Počekaev 2010: 372.)
                      - ʿAbd ar-Raḥmān of Astrakhan 1533–1537, 1539–1545 (Note: Howorth 1880: 362; Sabitov 2008: 294.)
                    - Jānī-Beg of Astrakhan 1514–1521 (Note: Howorth 1880: 362; Gaev 2002: 55; Sabitov 2008: 294; Počekaev 2010: 372.)
                      - Ḥusayn of Astrakhan 1521–1523, 1523–1526 (Note: Howorth 1880: 362; Sabitov 2008: 294.)
                  - Aḥmad of the Golden Horde 1459–1481 (Note: Howorth 1880: 362; Gaev 2002: 55; Sabitov 2008: 288; Počekaev 2010: 372.)
                    - Sayyid-Aḥmad III of the Golden Horde 1481–1491 (Note: Howorth 1880: 362; Gaev 2002: 55; Sabitov 2008: 288; Počekaev 2010: 372.)
                      - Qāsim II of Astrakhan 1528–1531, 1532 (Note: Howorth 1880: 362; Sabitov 2008: 294.)
                        - Yādigār-Muḥammad of Kazan 1552 (d. 1565) (Note: Howorth 1880: 362; Sabitov 2008: 292.)
                    - Murtaḍā of the Golden Horde 1481–1494; of Astrakhan 1485–1491, 1493–1494 (d. 1499) (Note: Howorth 1880: 362; Gaev 2002: 55; Sabitov 2008: 288; Počekaev 2010: 372.)
                      - Āq-Kibak of Astrakhan 1532–1533, 1545–1546, 1547–1550 (Note: Howorth 1880: 362; Sabitov 2008: 294.)
                        - ʿAbdallāh
                          - Muṣṭafā-ʿAlī of Kasimov 1573–1583 (Note: Sabitov 2008: 293.)
                      - Bīrdī-Beg
                        - Yāmghurchī of Astrakhan 1546–1547, 1550–1554 (Note: Howorth 1880: 362; Sabitov 2008: 294.)
                    - Shaykh-Aḥmad of the Golden Horde 1491–1502; of Astrakhan 1527–1528 (Note: Howorth 1880: 362; Gaev 2002: 55; Sabitov 2008: 288; Počekaev 2010: 372.)
                      - Shaykh-Ḥaydar (of Astrakhan in 1537–1541?) (Note: Howorth 1880: 362; Počekaev 2010: 372.)
                        - Darwīsh-ʿAlī of Astrakhan 1537–1539, 1554–1556 (d. after 1558) (Note: Gaev 2002: 54; Počekaev 2010: 372.)
                    - Sayyid-Maḥmūd of the Golden Horde 1491–1502 (Note: Gaev 2002: 55.)
                    - Bahādur (Note: Gaev 2002: 55.)
                      - Beg-Pūlād
                        - Sāyin-Pūlād of Kasimov 1567–1573, Russian Tsar as Semën Bekbulatovič 1574–1576 (d. 1616) (Note: Sabitov 2008: 293.)
                  - Bakhtiyār-Sulṭān (Note: Howorth 1880: 362; Sabitov 2008: 289, 293.)
                    - Shaykh-Awliyār of Kasimov 1512–1516 (Note: Howorth 1880: 362; Sabitov 2008: 293.)
                      - Shāh-ʿAlī of Kasimov 1516–1519, 1537–1567; of Kazan 1519–1521, 1546, 1551–1552 (Note: Sabitov 2008: 292-293.)
                      - Jān-ʿAlī of Kasimov 1519–1532; of Kazan 1531–1533 (d. 1535) (Note: Sabitov 2008: 292-293.)
                  - Yaʿqūb of Khwarazm 1461–1462 (Note: Gaev 2002: 54; Počekaev 2010: 372.)
                  - Jawāq (Chuwāq) of Khwarazm 1462 (Note: Howorth 1880: 743; Gaev 2002: 55; Welsford 2013: 50; Sabitov 2008: 300 makes Jawāq the son of his brother Yaʿqūb.)
                    - Māngishlāq (Note: Howorth 1880: 743-744; Gaev 2002: 55; Sabitov 2008: 300; Welsford 2013: 50.)
                      - Yār-Muḥammad 1st Ashtarkhanid khan of Bukhara 1599–1600 (d. 1612) (Note: Howorth 1880: 744; Gaev 2002: 55; Welsford 2013: 50.)
                        - Jānī-Muḥammad (or Jānī-Beg) of Bukhara 1600–1603 (Note: Howorth 1880: 744; Sabitov 2008: 300; Welsford 2013: 50.)
                          - Bāqī-Muḥammad of Bukhara 1603–1606 (Note: Howorth 1880: 744; Sabitov 2008: 300.)
                          - Walī-Muḥammad of Bukhara 1606–1611, 1611 (Note: Howorth 1880: 744; Sabitov 2008: 300.)
                            - Rustam-Muḥammad rival at Balkh 1613 (d. after 1641) (Note: Desmaisons 1871–1874: Table 1b; Howorth 1880: 747.)
                              - Muḥammad-Raḥīm (Note: Desmaisons 1871–1874: Table 1b.)
                                - ʿAbd-Allāh of Balkh 1711–1712 (Note: Sabitov 2008: 302.)
                                  - Sanjar of Balkh 1712–1717 (Note: Sabitov 2008: 302.)
                              - Muḥammad-Ṭāhir, 41st khan of Khwarazm 1739–1740 (d. 1742) (Note: Sabitov 2008: 304.)
                              - Walī-Muḥammad
                                - Muḥammad of Balkh 1717–1720 (Note: Sabitov 2008: 302.)
                          - Dīn-Muḥammad (Note: Howorth 1880: 744; Sabitov 2008: 302.)
                            - Imām-Qulī of Bukhara 1611, 1611–1641 (d. 1642) (Note: Howorth 1880: 744; Sabitov 2008: 300.)
                            - Nadhr-Muḥammad of Bukhara 1641–1645 (d. 1651) (Note: Howorth 1880: 744; Sabitov 2008: 300.)
                              - ʿAbd al-ʿAzīz of Bukhara 1645–1681 (d. 1684) (Note: Howorth 1880: 751; Sabitov 2008: 301.)
                              - Subḥān-Qulī of Bukhara 1681–1702 (Note: Howorth 1880: 755; Sabitov 2008: 301.)
                                - ʿUbaydallāh I of Bukhara 1702–1711 (Note: Howorth 1880: 760; Sabitov 2008: 301.)
                                - Abu'l-Fayḍ of Bukhara 1711–1747 (Note: Howorth 1880: 762; Sabitov 2008: 301.)
                                  - ʿAbd al-Muʾmin of Bukhara 1747–1750 (Note: Howorth 1880: 765; Sabitov 2008: 301.)
                                  - ʿUbaydallāh II of Bukhara 1750–1753 (adopted; biological son of Shāh-Tīmūr of Khwarazm)
                                  - (Khānim) married Muḥammad-Ḥājjī-Sulṭān
                                    - Abu'l-Ghāzī of Bukhara 1758–1789; Khiva 1767–1768 (d. 1796) (Note: Sabitov 2008: 301.)
                                - Iskandar of Balkh 1681–1683 (Note: Sabitov 2008: 302.)
                                  - Muḥammad-Muqīm of Balkh 1697–1707 (Note: Sabitov 2008: 302.)
                                - Abu'l-Manṣūr of Balkh 1683 (Note: Sabitov 2008: 302.)
                                - Ṣaddīq-Muḥammad of Balkh 1683–1686 (Note: Sabitov 2008: 302.)
                        - Tursūn-Muḥammad (Note: Howorth 1880: 744; Sabitov 2008: 301.)
                          - Muḥammad-Ibrāhīm possibly the ruler of Balkh in 1601 (Note: Howorth 1880: 744; Sabitov 2008: 301.)
          - Qutlū-Beg
            - Shādī-Beg of the Golden Horde 1399–1407 (Note: Gaev 2002: 54; Sabitov 2008: 286; Počekaev 2010: 372; Howorth 1880: 263 and Stokvis 1888: chapter 9 table 7 make him erroneously son of Urus' son Tīmūr-Malik.)
              - Ghiyāth ad-Dīn II of the Golden Horde 1421, 1423–1426 (Note: Gaev 2002: 54; Počekaev 2010: 372.)
                - Muṣṭafā claimant at Astrakhan 1431–1433; in the Ulus of Orda 1440–1446; of Khwarazm 1447–1464 (Note: Gaev 2002: 54; Sabitov 2008: 288.)
      - Mīnkāsar
        - ʿAbdallāh of the Golden Horde 1361–1370 (Note: Gaev 2002: 54.)
          - Muḥammad-Sulṭān of the Golden Horde 1370–1379 (Note: Gaev 2002: 54.)
        - Tughluq-Khwāja
          - Tawakkul = Tūlāk of the Golden Horde 1379–1380 (Note: As proposed by Gaev 2002: 54.)
        - Āqmīl
          - Chekre khan of Sibir and Bolghar 1413, of the Golden Horde 1415–1416 (Note: Gaev 2002: 55; Sabitov 2008: 287; Počekaev 2010: 372.)
        - Mamkī
          - Sayyid-Aḥmad I of the Golden Horde 1416 (disputed identification) (Note: Preferred by Počekaev 2010: 194, 372.)
          - Altī-Qurtuqā
            - Darwīsh of the Golden Horde 1417–1419 (Note: Gaev 2002: 55; Sabitov 2008: 287; Počekaev 2010: 372.)

An annotated genealogical list of the known reigning descendants of Tuqa-Timur, son of Jochi, son of Genghis Khan. The list includes khans and rival khans, as well as the princes through whom the line of descent passed. The main sources for the Medieval and Early Modern generations are the major genealogical compendium Muʿizz al-ansāb and the Tawārīḫ-i guzīdah-i nuṣrat-nāmah, supplemented by other sources and secondary literature. For consistency, the names are given in the standard scholarly transcription used in English-language scholarship (e.g., Bosworth 1996) for Perso-Arabic sources such as these.

== Bibliography ==
- Bennigsen, A., et al., Le Khanat de Crimée dans les Archives du Musée de Palais de Topkapı, Paris, 1978.
- Bosworth, C. E., The New Islamic Dynasties, New York, 1996.
- Bregel, Y. (transl.), Firdaws al-Iqbāl: History of Khorezm by Shir Muhammad Mirab Munis and Muhammad Riza Mirab Agahi, Leiden, 1999.
- Burton, A., The Bukharans: A Dynastic, Diplomatic and Commercial History 1550–1702, Richmond, 1997
- Desmaisons, P. I. (transl.), Histoire des Mongols et des Tatares par Aboul-Ghâzi Béhâdour Khân, St Petersburg, 1871–1874.
- Gaev, A. G., "Genealogija i hronologija Džučidov," Numizmatičeskij sbornik 3 (2002) 9-55.
- Howorth, H. H., History of the Mongols from the 9th to the 19th Century. Part II.1. London, 1880.
- Jackson, P., The Mongols and the Islamic World, New Haven, 2017.
- Judin, V. P., Materialy po istorii kazahskih hanstv XV-XVIII vekov, Alma Ata, 1969.
- Judin, V. P., Utemiš-hadži, Čingiz-name, Alma-Ata, 1992.
- May, T., The Mongol Empire, Edinburgh, 2018.
- Počekaev, R. J., Cari ordynskie: Biografii hanov i pravitelej Zolotoj Ordy. Saint Petersburg, 2010.
- Sabitov, Ž. M., Genealogija "Tore", Astana, 2008.
- Sabitov, Ž. M., "K voporosu o genealogii zolotoordynskogo hana Bek-Sufi," in Krim: vìd antičnostì do s'ogodennja, Kiev, 2014: 63-74.
- Sagdeeva, R. Z., Serebrjannye monety hanov Zolotoj Ordy, Moscow, 2005.
- Seleznëv, J. V., Èlita Zolotoj Ordy, Kazan', 2009.
- Sidorneko, V. A., Monetnaja čekanka Krymskogo hanstva (1442–1475 gg.), Simferopol', 2016.
- Stokvis, A. M. H. J., Manuel d'Histoire, de Généalogie et de Chronologie de tous les États du Globe, depuis les temps les plus reculés jusqu'à nos jours, vol. 1, Leiden, 1888.
- Tabuldin, G. Zh. et al, World Genealogy of Genghisides: Popular Science Edition, fifth edition (modified and supplemented). Astana, 2022.
- Tizengauzen, V. G. (trans.), Sbornik materialov, otnosjaščihsja k istorii Zolotoj Ordy. Izvlečenija iz arabskih sočinenii, republished as Istorija Kazahstana v arabskih istočnikah. 1. Almaty, 2005.
- Tizengauzen, V. G. (trans.), Sbornik materialov otnosjaščihsja k istorii Zolotoj Ordy. Izvlečenija iz persidskih sočinenii, republished as Istorija Kazahstana v persidskih istočnikah. 4. Almaty, 2006.
- Vásáry, I., "The beginnings of coinage in the Blue Horde," Acta Orientalia Academiae Scientiarum Hungaricae 62 (2009) 371-385.
- Vohidov, Š. H. (trans.), Istorija Kazahstana v persidskih istočnikah. 3. Muʿizz al-ansāb. Almaty, 2006.
- Welsford, T., Four Types of Loyalty in Early Modern Central Asia: The Tūqūy-Tīmūrid Takeover of Greater Mā Warā al-Nahr, 1598-1605, Leiden, 2013.

== See also ==
- List of khans of the Golden Horde

== Bibliography ==
- Bennigsen, A., et al., Le Khanat de Crimée dans les Archives du Musée de Palais de Topkapı, Paris, 1978.
- Bosworth, C. E., The New Islamic Dynasties, New York, 1996.
- Bregel, Y. (transl.), Firdaws al-Iqbāl: History of Khorezm by Shir Muhammad Mirab Munis and Muhammad Riza Mirab Agahi, Leiden, 1999.
- Burton, A., The Bukharans: A Dynastic, Diplomatic and Commercial History 1550–1702, Richmond, 1997
- Desmaisons, P. I. (transl.), Histoire des Mongols et des Tatares par Aboul-Ghâzi Béhâdour Khân, St Petersburg, 1871–1874.
- Gaev, A. G., "Genealogija i hronologija Džučidov," Numizmatičeskij sbornik 3 (2002) 9-55.
- Howorth, H. H., History of the Mongols from the 9th to the 19th Century. Part II.1. London, 1880.
- Jackson, P., The Mongols and the Islamic World, New Haven, 2017.
- Judin, V. P., Utemiš-hadži, Čingiz-name, Alma-Ata, 1992.
- May, T., The Mongol Empire, Edinburgh, 2018.
- Počekaev, R. J., Cari ordynskie: Biografii hanov i pravitelej Zolotoj Ordy. Saint Petersburg, 2010.
- Sabitov, Ž. M., Genealogija "Tore", Astana, 2008.
- Sabitov, Ž. M., "K voporosu o genealogii zolotoordynskogo hana Bek-Sufi," in Krim: vìd antičnostì do s'ogodennja, Kiev, 2014: 63-74.
- Sagdeeva, R. Z., Serebrjannye monety hanov Zolotoj Ordy, Moscow, 2005.
- Seleznëv, J. V., Èlita Zolotoj Ordy, Kazan', 2009.
- Sidorneko, V. A., Monetnaja čekanka Krymskogo hanstva (1442–1475 gg.), Simferopol', 2016.
- Stokvis, A. M. H. J., Manuel d'Histoire, de Généalogie et de Chronologie de tous les États du Globe, depuis les temps les plus reculés jusqu'à nos jours, vol. 1, Leiden, 1888.
- Thackston, W. M. (trans.), Rashiduddin Fazlullah's Jamiʻuʼt-tawarikh: Compendium of Chronicles. A History of the Mongols. Part One. Cambridge, MA, 1998.
- Tizengauzen, V. G. (trans.), Sbornik materialov, otnosjaščihsja k istorii Zolotoj Ordy. Izvlečenija iz arabskih sočinenii, republished as Istorija Kazahstana v arabskih istočnikah. 1. Almaty, 2005.
- Tizengauzen, V. G. (trans.), Sbornik materialov otnosjaščihsja k istorii Zolotoj Ordy. Izvlečenija iz persidskih sočinenii, republished as Istorija Kazahstana v persidskih istočnikah. 4. Almaty, 2006.
- Vásáry, I., "The beginnings of coinage in the Blue Horde," Acta Orientalia Academiae Scientiarum Hungaricae 62 (2009) 371-385.
- Vohidov, Š. H. (trans.), Istorija Kazahstana v persidskih istočnikah. 3. Muʿizz al-ansāb. Almaty, 2006.
- Welsford, T., Four Types of Loyalty in Early Modern Central Asia: The Tūqūy-Tīmūrid Takeover of Greater Mā Warā al-Nahr, 1598-1605, Leiden, 2013.
