= List of Astrakhan khans =

Below is a list of rulers of the Astrakhan Khanate. These were independent rulers of part of the Golden Horde territories after its decline began; the area was centred on the lower Volga. It was conquered and reduced to a vassal state by Ivan the Terrible in 1554 and fully annexed in 1557.

== First list with full names ==
- Küchük Muhammad - one of the Last Khans of the Golden Horde had a son named Mahmud bin Küchük who succeeded him as Khan of the remnant Khanate named the Great Horde. He was deposed in a struggle for power by his brother, Ahmed Khan who became the last Khan of the Golden Horde/Great Horde. Mahmud, however, managed to keep territory named Haji Tarkhan (in Persian: حاجی‌ترخان or Haji-Tarkhan; in Russian: Астрахань or Astrakhan) and established his own Khanate there in 1465 C.E.

Titular Name	Personal Name	Reign
Khan خان	Mahmud Astrakhani محمود بن کوچک	1465–1466 C.E.
Khan خان	Qasim I of Astrakhan قاسم بن محمود	1466–1490 C.E.
Khan خان	Abdal-Karim Khan Astrakhani عبد الکریم	1490–1504 C.E.
Khan خان	Qasim II of Astrakhan قاسم بن سید احمد	1504–1532 C.E.
Khan خان	Aq Kubek of Astrakhan اق قبق بن مرتضی بیگ	1532–1534 C.E. (1st reign)
Khan خان	Abdur-Rahman عبد الرحمان	1534–1538 C.E.
Khan خان	Sheikh Haydar Astrakhani شیخ حیدر	1538–1541 C.E.
Khan خان	Aq Kubek of Astrakhan اق قبق بن مرتضی بیگ	1541–1544 C.E. (2nd reign)
Khan خان	Yamghurchi of Astrakhan يامغورچي	1544–1554 C.E.
Khan خان	Dervish Ali Astrakhani درویش علی	1554–1556/57 C.E.
Ivan the Terrible, the Tsar of Russia conquered the Astrakhan Khanate in 1557 C.E.

== Second list with short biographies ==
There appears to be no modern book in English on the Astrakhan Khanate. According to Frank “The dates and activities of these rulers are faintly represented in the sources, when they are represented at all.” Outside of what might be found in a large library the only sources appear to be Howorth's 1880 book, 3 pages of Frank and the English and Russian Wikipedias. The following combines these four sources and notes the contradictions, which are numerous. Regnal dates and sequences from the Russian Wikipedia are preferred since it probably has better sources. Dates currently (June 2018) in the English Wikipedia are in parentheses. These have been there since 2009 and are unsourced. Howorth has few dates. The form "6>7>8" is the regnal sequence using the numbers in the below list. It is followed by the equivalent in the English Wikipedia when it differs. En: and Ru: mean the English and Russian Wikipedias when this is necessary.

Genealogy from Howorth, part 2, page 362

- Kuchuk Muhammad #0 sons (G1: Mahmud#1, G2:Ahmed, Yakub, Bakhtiar)
- G1.Mahmud sons (Qasim#2, Janibeg (son Husein#4), Abdul Kerim#3 (son Abdul Rahman#7))
- G2.Ahmed Khan sons (Seyid Ahmed (son Qasim II#5, G3:Murtaza, Sheikh Ahmed (son Haidar#8 (son Dervish#10)))
- G3.Murtaza sons(Ak Kubek#5, Berdibeg (son Yamgurchi#12)
- Yadegar Mokhammad of Kazan, the last khan of Kazan, was the son of Qasim II #5. Yar Muhammad, said to be from Astrakhan, founded a dynasty in Bukhara.

List

- 0. Golden Horde Khan Küchük Muhammad 1432–59 (en:1435–59). Defeated Ulugh Muhammad who fled and founded the Khanate of Kazan in 1438. His sons were Mahmud#1 and Ahmed Khan bin Küchük (1465–81), the man who lost Russia in 1480. Ahmed Khan's three sons fought over what was left of the Golden Horde until its extinction in 1502. The Astrakhan khans were all descended from Kuchuk Muhammad through his sons Mahmud or Ahmed.
- 1. Mahmud bin Küchük x>1>2,1460s–1470s (en:1465–66). Son of #0. Fought or shared power with his brother Ahmed Khan bin Küchük. Ahmed seems to have held much of the steppe while Mahmud had a power base near Astrakhan. Minted coins, letter to the Sultan in 1466 claiming Astrakhan area as his patrimony, possibly anti-Crimean.
- 2. Qasim I of Astrakhan 1>2>3 1470s–1495, (en 1466–90). Son of #1. Most sources date the foundation of the khanate around 1466, but do not clearly explain what this means. Zaitsev argued that it was a constituent of the Great Horde until the Horde was destroyed in 1502. Howorth equates Qasim with the Tatars who robbed Afanasy Nikitin in 1466. Ambrogio Contarini passed through in 1476. He said that Astrakhan was held by Qasim and his two brothers, who would be Abdul#3 and Janibeg (see #4). They spent the winter there and that Qasim was in conflict with his uncle Ahmed. It is reported that he was besieged by Ibak Khan and that in 1480 he was with his uncle at the Great stand on the Ugra river.
- 3. Abdal-Karim Khan Astrakhani 2>3>5,1495–1525 (en 1490–1504), (or Frank:1502–14) brother of #2, overthrew #2 with support of Great Horde, pro-Great Horde, anti-Russian, anti-Crimean. Involved in the break-up of the Great Horde. Fought Crimea in 1509.
- 4.? Hussein Khan: son of Janibeg who was the brother of #2 and #3. 4a: According to Howorth, who seems to follow Karamzin: In 1521 interfered with a Crimean raid on Moscow. In 1522 Mehmed I Giray drove him out of Astrakhan, but he returned the next year. 4b: Frank, following Zaitsev, has #3 followed by his brother Janibeg, (r.1514–21) and thinks that Hussein may have been ruler at the time of the raid. 4c: According to ru:Мехмед I Герай, which follows Gaivoronsky: In 1522 Mehmed decided to attack Astrakhan in alliance with the Nogais. Hussein fled his capital and Astrakhan was occupied without fighting in the spring of 1523. Mehmed made his son Bakhadyr khan of Astrakhan. He then unwisely dismissed part of his army and remained in Astrakhan. The Nogais, fearing his increased power, killed him and his son. The Nogais then made a devastating attack on Crimea. Frank says “During the following three decades” (1520s–1540s) “our information on the reigns, and even the names, of the khans of Astrakhan is particularly sparse and contradictory.”
- 5. Qasim II of Astrakhan 3>5>6,1520s–1532 (en 1504–32) Grandson of Ahmed Khan, took power with Nogai support. 1532 envoy to Moscow. Howorth says that Circassians raided Astrakhan and captured him. Ru: has him driven out and killed by #6.
- 6. 1st Aq Kubek of Astrakhan 5>6>7,1532–33 (en 1532–34) son of Murtaza, grandson of Ahmed Khan, cousin of #5. Enthroned by Circassians. His son Abdulla married a daughter of Canghali of Kazan and their son was the Qasim khan Mustafa.
- 7. 1st Abdur Rahman Astrakhani 6>7>9 (en 6>7>8),1533–37 (en 1534–38) son of #3, overthrew #6 with Nogai support. Later removed by Nogais. Pro-Russian. Russian envoy in 1537.
- 8. Sheikh Haydar Astrakhani ru:not cited, (Howorth: not cited), (en: 7>8>11,1538–41) (Pochekaev: 1537–42), Grandson of Ahmed through Sheikh Ahmed. Uncertain.
- 9. 1st Dervish Ali Astrakhani 7>9>10,1537–39 (en: not cited) son of #8. Enthroned by Nogais
- 10. 2nd Abdur Rahman Astrakhani 9>10>11,1539–45 (en: not cited) In 1539–41 envoys to and from Moscow. Deposed by Ak Kubek and Nogais
- 11 2nd Aq Kubek of Astrakhan 10>11>12,1545–46 (en 8>11>12,1541–44) (Howorth: not cited) deposed by Yamgurchi.
- 12 1st Yamghurchi of Astrakhan 11>12>13,1546–47 (en 11>12>15,1544–54) According to Howorth, who follows Karamzin: He was the son of Ak Kubek's brother Berdibeg. Like Ak Kubek, supported by Circassians. He was khan about 1549 when Sahib Giray of Crimea destroyed Astrakhan and carried off its wealth and inhabitants. Sultan Suliman ordered Sahib to restore the town where Yamgurchi still ruled. In 1551 an envoy went to Moscow and submitted Astrakhan to Russia on the same terms that had just been made by Shah Ali of Kazan. If this is correct it implies that Russia now had some power down the Volga, which is not otherwise explained.
- 13 3rd Aq Kubek of Astrakhan 12>13>14,1547–50 (en: not cited) (Howorth: not cited) According to ru: deposed Yamgurchi with support of Sahib I Giray of Crimea, then deposed by Yamgurchi with Russian support. Howorth and the English Wikipedia omit this reign and have Yamghuchi(#12,#14) continuous. #13 may have held some kind of power as a result of Sahib Giray's raid.
- 14 2nd Yamghurchi of Astrakhan 13>14>15 (en 11>14>15) 1550–54 (en 1544–54) Nominally submitted to Russians. In 1551 or 1554 he turned against them, probably because of what was happening in Kazan and allied himself with Crimea and the Nogai Yusuf (the father of the unfortunate Söyembikä of Kazan). Russia sent 30000 troops against him. This implies that Russia now had the power to send troops down the Volga, which is not otherwise explained. He and most of the town population fled to islands in the Volga delta. After two defeats Yamghurchi fled with 20 followers to Azov and on this news most of the people submitted. This was two years after the conquest of Kazan. He later tried and failed to regain Astrakhan. He may have been killed by the Small Horde Nogais.
- 15 2nd Dervish Ali Astrakhani 14>15>x,1554–56 (en 1554–57) In 1539 expelled from Astrakhan (#9), 1548 at Moscow, 1549 to Nogais, 1552–54 fief of Zvenigorod. In 1554 made khan by Russians, began dealings with Crimea. Crimea sent artillery and soldiers, Russia sent several armies. He was finally defeated when the Nogais turned against him. 1556 Astrakhan occupied. He fled to Azov and died in Mecca.
