= Qasim of Astrakhan =

Qasim of Astrakhan is the name of:

- Qasim I of Astrakhan (died 1500), ruler of the Khanate of Astrakhan from 1466 to 1490
- Qasim II of Astrakhan (died 1532), ruler of the Khanate of Astrakhan from 1504 to 1532
