= Chor Baqqoli Madrasa =

Madrasa in Bukhara, Uzbekistan

The Chor Baqqoli Madrasa was a madrasa in Bukhara, Uzbekistan.

== Background ==
The madrasa does not exist today. Chor Baqqoli Madrasa was built in the 17th century near the Samarkand Gate, during the reign of the Ashtarkhanid dynasty in the Bukhara Khanate, by Amir Yormuhammad Devonbegi, son of Amir Jonish.

There was a large domed mosque and a wooden madrasa with 12 cells next to the gate. Researcher Abdusattor Jumanazarov studied a number of documents related to this madrasa and provided information about it. Information about this madrasa can be found in the waqf document of Mavlono Miskin Madrasa. The document states that seven shops were endowed for Chor Baqqoli Madrasa. The madrasa was attached to the mosque, and had cells on the upper and lower floors, a washing room and a courtyard. There was a street on the west side of the madrasa, houses on the north and east sides, and a street on the south side. Amir Yormuhammad Devonbegi endowed more than ten shops in Bukhara, the Kabadun near the Shaykh Jalal Khanaqah, the Varazung estate in Gijduvan district, and the Panjkat area in Komi Abu Muslim district for the madrasa. The endower himself was the trustee of the madrasa. If he died, his descendants would continue this work. The document was formalized on the 23rd of Rajab in the year 1017 AH (November 2, 1608 AD) and was confirmed by the seal of Amir Shohmurod. The documents contain information about the teachers who taught at the madrasa and their salaries. For example, Mulla Safar's salary was 30 gold coins, and Mulla Qudratulla's salary was 20 gold coins. Chor Baqqoli Madrasa consisted of eight cells. The madrasa was built in the style of Central Asian architecture. The madrasa was made of baked bricks, wood, stone and plaster.
