= Abdal-Karim Khan =

Khan of Astrakhan from 1490 to 1504

Abdal-Karim Khan Astrakhani

Khan of the Tatar Astrakhan Khanate
- Reign: 1490–1504
- Predecessor: Qasim I of Astrakhan
- Successor: Qasim II of Astrakhan
- Died: c. 1520

Abdal-Karim Khan (Persian: عبد الکریم; Tatar: Габделкәри́м хан) was Khan of Astrakhan from 1490 through 1504. Another possibility is that he ruled from 1502-1514 while being probably important beginning in the 1490s.

Abdal-Karim was the son or brother of Mahmud.

The Russian historian Ilya Zaitsev proposes that Abdal-Karim was the first ruler of the "independent" Khanate of Astrakhan because he was the first ruler of Astrakhan after the collapse of the Great Horde in 1502. Historians Marjani and Safargaliev had previously argued that the Astrakhan khanate came into existence in the 1460s. Zaitsev thinks the khan was a puppet ruler of Yamghurchi Biy, ruler of the Noghai Horde. Astrakhan received Noghai military assistance in withstanding attacks from Crimean Tatars in 1509.

Stéphane Dudoignon, an editor of the Central Eurasian Reader, sees Abdal-Karim as one of the Khanate of Astrakhan most prominent rulers.

For uncertainties and additional information see the second part of List of Astrakhan khans.

Abdal-Karim Khan House of Borjigin (Боржигин)
Regnal titles
Preceded by Qasim I of Astrakhan	Khan of Astrakan; 1490–1504	Succeeded by Qasim II of Astrakhan
