= Qasim II of Astrakhan =

Qasim II

Khan of the Tatar Astrakhan Khanate
- Reign: 1504–1532
- Predecessor: Abdal-Karim Khan Astrakhani
- Successor: Aq Kubek of Astrakhan
- Died: 1532

Qasim II Khan (Turki/Kypchak and Persian: قاسم خان ثانی; died 1532) was the ruler of the Astrakhan Khanate until 1532. He was a son of Big Horde's khan Sayed Akhmad, and a grandson of Akhmat. He occupied Xacitarxan throne with the help of Nogays. He was a supporter of centralization policy. He is known to send a letter to Ottoman sultan Süleyman in 1531/1532. He was deposed and killed by Aq Kübek.

== See also ==
- List of Astrakhan khans

Qasim II of Astrakhan House of Borjigin (Боржигин)
Regnal titles
Preceded by Ghabdelkarim of Astrakhan	Khan of Astrakan; 1504–1532	Succeeded by Aq Kübek
