= Aq Kubek of Astrakhan =

Russian ruler of Astrakhan Khanate

Aq Kubek

Khan of the Tatar Astrakhan Khanate
- Reign: 1532–1534
- Predecessor: Qasim II of Astrakhan
- Successor: Abdur Rahman Astrakhani

Khan of the Tatar Astrakhan Khanate
- Reign: 1541–1544
- Predecessor: Sheikh Haydar Astrakhani
- Successor: Yamghurchi of Astrakhan
- Born: unknown
- Died: c. 1550

Aq Kübek Khan (Note: Turki/Kypchak and Persian: آق کبک خان) (?–~1550; also Aq Köbek), was a ruler of Astrakhan Khanate in 1532–1534 and 1541–1544. He was the son of Mortaza Beg. He pursued politics against Crimean Khanate and Nogay Horde for the Astrakhan Khanate's independence. He was overthrown by Yamghurchi khan. For uncertainties and additional information, see the second part of List of Astrakhan khans.

Preceded by Qasim II	Khan of Astrakhan; 1532–1534	Succeeded by Ghabdraxman
Preceded by Shayex Xaydar	Khan of Astrakhan; 1541–1544	Succeeded by Yamghurchi
