= Chyorny Yar =

Chyorny Yar (Russian: Чёрный Яр) is the name of several rural localities in Russia:

- Chyorny Yar, Arkhangelsk Oblast, a village in Lyavlensky Selsoviet of Primorsky District of Arkhangelsk Oblast
- Chyorny Yar, Astrakhan Oblast, a selo in Chernoyarsky Selsoviet of Chernoyarsky District of Astrakhan Oblast
- Chyorny Yar, Komi Republic, a settlement in Ust-Vym Selo Administrative Territory of Ust-Vymsky District of the Komi Republic
- Chyorny Yar, Perm Krai, a selo in Kishertsky District of Perm Krai
- Chyorny Yar, Sverdlovsk Oblast, a settlement in Novolyalinsky District of Sverdlovsk Oblast
- Chyorny Yar, Tomsk Oblast, a settlement in Teguldetsky District of Tomsk Oblast
