= Mahmud bin Küchük =

Khan of the Great Horde
- Reign: 1459–1465
- Predecessor: Küchük Muhammad
- Successor: Ahmed Khan bin Küchük

Khan of the Tatar Astrakhan Khanate
- Reign: 1465–1466
- Predecessor: Monarchy established
- Successor: Qasim I of Astrakhan
- Died: 1466
- Dynasty: Borjigin
- Religion: Sunni Islam

Maḥmūd bin Muḥammad bin Tīmūr Khān (Turki and Persian: محمود بن محمد بن تیمور خان), also known as Mahmud Astrakhani (Tatar: Ästerxannıñ Mäxmüd) was one of Küchük Muhammad's sons and a Khan who founded the Khanate of Astrakhan in the 1460s.

== Life ==
After years of struggle for the throne of the Great Horde against Akhmat Khan, he escaped to the town of Hajji Tarkhan (or Xacitarxan), establishing the independent Khanate of Astrakhan there. Mahmud Astrakhani maintained friendly relations with his powerful neighbors—the Nogay Horde and the Great Horde and coined his own money.

His letter to the Ottoman Sultan Mehmed II (as dispatched on April 10, 1466) is a curious example of diplomatic epistles written in Persian or in the 15th-century Old Tatar language. The content is a necessity of establishment of diplomatic relations between Ottoman Empire and Astrakhan, and sending ambassadors to Istanbul.

For uncertainties and additional information see the second part of List of Astrakhan khans.

His son Janibeg briefly ruled Crimea in the winter of 1476/77 until he was driven out by the legitimate ruler Nur Devlet.

== Genealogy ==
- Genghis Khan
- Jochi
- Orda Khan
- Sartaqtay
- Köchü
- Bayan
- Sasibuqa
- Ilbasan
- Chimtay
- Urus
- Temur-Malik
- Temür Qutlugh
- Temur ibn Temur Qutlugh
- Küchük Muhammad
- Mahmud bin Küchük

Mahmud bin Küchük House of Borjigin (Боржигин) (1206–1635)
Regnal titles
| Preceded by Küchük Muhammad | Khan of the Great Horde; 1459–1465 | Succeeded by Akhmat Khan |
| Preceded by Position established | Khan of Astrakan; 1465–1466 | Succeeded by Qasim I |
