= Abdur Rahman Astrakhani =

Khan of the Tatar Astrakhan Khanate
- Reign: 1534–1538
- Predecessor: Aq Kubek of Astrakhan
- Successor: Sheikh Haydar Astrakhani
- Died: c. 1545

Abdur Rahman Astrakhani (Persian: عبد الرحمان; Tatar: Абдуррахман Әстерхан) was a Khan of Astrakhan from 1534 through 1538. For uncertainties and additional information, see the second part of the List of Astrakhan khans.

Regnal titles
Preceded by Aq Kubek	Khan of Astrakan; 1534–1538	Succeeded by Shayex Xaydar
