= Dervish Ali Astrakhani =

Dervish Ali

Khan of the Tatar Astrakhan Khanate
- Reign: 1554–1557
- Predecessor: Yamghurchi of Astrakhan
- Successor: None
- Died: c. 1558
- Religion: Sunni Islam

Dervish Ali Astrakhani (Persian: درویش علی; Russian: Дервиш-Али, romanized: Darwish Ghali; Tatar: Дәрвиш Гали хан, Därwiş Ğäli xan; died c. 1558) was Khan of the Astrakhan Khanate from 1554 until the Khanate's fall in 1556. He was a grandson of Ahmed Khan, of the Golden Horde.

With the support of Nogai noble Isma'il Khan Nogai and the Russian military forces, he occupied the Astrakhan Khanate throne. Later Yamghurchi was defeated by the Russians, and with the help of the noble Yusuf's sons, Dervish Ali Astrakhani finally defeated Yamghurchi in 1555. In that year, he was defeated by Isma'il Khan Nogai and left Astrakhan Khanate. However, with the help of Ivan IV of Russia, he returned to the throne again. Nevertheless, he started a struggle against pro-Muscovite nobles and placed an Ottoman garrison in the capital Haji Tarkhan. After the Russian conquest of the Astrakhan Khanate, he still struggled against the Russians in guerrilla war. After the final battle, he went to Azov (Azaq) and later to Mecca.

Preceded by Yaghmurchi	Khan of Astrakhan; 1554–1557	Succeeded by Ivan IV of Russia (as Tsar of Astrakhan)
