= Sheikh Haydar Astrakhani =

Khan of the Tatar Astrakhan Khanate
- Reign: 1538–1541
- Predecessor: Abdur Rahman Astrakhani
- Successor: Aq Kubek of Astrakhan
- Born: unknown
- Died: c. 1541

Sheikh Haydar Astrakhani (Persian: شیخ حیدر; Tatar: Шейх Хайдар Әстерхан) was Khan of Astrakhan from 1538 through 1541.

== See also ==
- List of Astrakhan khans

| Preceded by Abdur Rahman | Khan of Astrakhan; 1538–1541 | Succeeded by Aq Kubek of Astrakhan |
