= Chyorny Yar, Perm Krai =

Chyorny Yar Чёрный Яр
- Selo
- Location within Perm Krai Location within Russia
- Coordinates: 57°16′N 57°25′E
- Country: Russia
- Region: Perm Krai
- District: Kishertsky District
- Time zone: UTC+5:00

Chyorny Yar (Russian: Чёрный Яр) is a rural locality (a selo) in Kishertskoye Rural Settlement, Kishertsky District, Perm Krai, Russia. The population was 159 as of 2010. There is 1 street.

== Geography ==
Chyorny Yar is located 20 km southeast of Ust-Kishert (the district's administrative centre) by road. Chernoyarskaya Odina is the nearest rural locality.
