= Yamghurchi of Astrakhan =

Yamghurchi

Khan of the Tatar Astrakhan Khanate
- Reign: 1544–1554
- Predecessor: Aq Kubek of Astrakhan
- Successor: Dervish Ali Astrakhani
- Born: unknown
- Died: 1555
- Religion: Islam

Yamghurchi Khan (Note: Turki/Kypchak and Persian: یامغرچی خان) (died 1555) was a ruler of the Astrakhan Khanate since the 1540s. He occupied the throne with the help of the Nogay nobility. In the battle of Xacitarxan in 1554 the Russians defeated him. They occupied the area from 1556. He escaped to lands behind the Terek river. In 1555 he was killed in dissension with Nogais. For uncertainties and additional information see the second part of List of Astrakhan khans.

Preceded by Aq Kubek	Khan of Astrakhan; 1544–1554	Succeeded by Darwish Ghali
