= Küchük Muhammad =

1435–1459 Khan of the Golden Horde

Khan of the Golden Horde
- Reign: 1433–1459
- Predecessor: Ulugh Muḥammad
- Successor: Maḥmūd and Aḥmad
- Born: 28 June 1391
- Died: 1459 (aged 67–68)
- Issue: Maḥmūd; Aḥmad
- Dynasty: Borjigin
- Father: Tīmūr Khan
- Religion: Sunni Islam

Muḥammad bin Tīmūr (Chagatai language and Persian: محمد بن تیمور), better known by his alias Küchük Muḥammad (Kypchak: کچک محمد, Turki: کچیک محمد, (Note: Also spelled کیچیک محمد) Persian: کوچک محمد); 28 June 1391 – 1459) was Khan of the Golden Horde from 1433 until his death in 1459. He was the son of Tīmūr Khan, possibly by a daughter of the powerful beglerbeg, Edigu. His name, "Little Muḥammad," was intended to distinguish him from a rival and older contemporary, Ulugh Muḥammad, "Big Muḥammad."

== Biography ==
Küchük Muḥammad started out as would-be khan at (old) Astrakhan from c. 1428, supported by his possible uncles, Ghāzī and Nawrūz, the sons of Edigu. A quarrel with the emir Nawrūz cost Küchük Muḥammad his desertion to Ulugh Muḥammad, and for a long time neither khan could eliminate his rival. However, Ulugh Muḥammad alienated more of his leading emirs, like Tekne and Ḥaydar, who deserted him to set up their own khan, Sayyid Aḥmad, son of Beg Ṣūfī, in 1432. Weakened by this, Ulugh Muḥammad came to terms with Küchük Muḥammad in 1432 or 1433, dividing the Golden Horde along the Volga, Ulugh Muḥammad taking the area to the west, Küchük Muḥammad the area to the east. Sayyid Aḥmad held his own, and thus the Golden Horde was effectively divided among three khans in an impasse. The Russian Grand Prince Vasilij II Vasil'evič of Moscow sent tribute to all three khans in 1434, not wishing to risk displeasing any of them, faced as he was with rival claims on his throne. The impasse was broken by the desertion of the beglerbeg Nawrūz from Ulugh Muḥammad back to Küchük Muḥammad in 1437. The weakened Ulugh Muḥammad was now attacked first by Sayyid Aḥmad, then by Küchük Muḥammad. With his army scattered and partly seeking refuge in Lithuania, Ulugh Muḥammad escaped destruction only because Küchük Muḥammad was distracted by having to expel Shādī Beg's son Ghiyāth ad-Dīn from Sarai. Ulugh Muḥammad now sought refuge and support from Vasilij II of Moscow, who attacked the fugitive khan but was defeated. This victory allowed Ulugh Muḥammad to ensconce himself at Kazan.

The cause of Küchük Muḥammad was not helped by the ongoing rivalry between him and Sayyid Aḥmad. Although master of Sarai, Küchük Muḥammad remained based primarily on Astrakhan. Large sections of the Golden Horde remained outside his control, most notably the north under Ulugh Muḥammad, the southwest under Sayyid Aḥmad, and the east under Abu'l-Khayr of the Uzbeks and Maḥmūdāq of Sibir. Because the Russians and Lithuanians had more dealings with Ulugh Muḥammad and Sayyid Aḥmad, the later history of Küchük Muḥammad's reign is more obscure. Judging by his last coinage and the first mention of his sons as khans, Küchük Muḥammad appears to have died in 1459.

Given the fragmentation of the Golden Horde, the polity headed by Küchük Muḥammad and his descendants (apart from the line in Astrakhan) is sometimes known as the Great Horde.

== Descendants ==
Küchük Muḥammad had several sons, of whom only two played a particularly significant role in history, Maḥmūd and Aḥmad.

The Tawārīḫ-i guzīdah-i nuṣrat-nāmah lists the following, but the passage is evidently corrupt, as suggested by various features, including the omission of Maḥmūd and disconnection of Aḥmad:

- Qāsim Khan
- Boz Torgay
- ʿAbd al-Karīm
- Kildi Beg

Sabitov 2008 corrects this listing to:

- Maḥmūd, khan of the Great Horde 1459-1465; of Astrakhan 1465-1471
  - Qāsim Khan
  - Boz Torgay
  - ʿAbd al-Karīm, khan of the Great Horde 1481-by 1484, 1491; of Astrakhan 1481-1485, 1491-1493, 1494-1514
  - Kildi Beg
- Aḥmad, khan of the Great Horde 1459-1481
  - Murtaḍā, khan of the Great Horde by 1484-1491, 1493-1494; of Astrakhan 1485-1491, 1493-1494, d. 1499
  - Sayyid Aḥmad, khan of the Great Horde 1481-1491
  - Šayḫ Aḥmad, khan of the Great Horde 1491-1493, 1494-1502; of Astrakhan 1527-1528
  - Sayyid Maḥmūd/Muḥammad, khan of the Great Horde 1491-1502
  - Uki
  - Khwāja Muḥammad
  - Ḥusayn
  - Jānī Beg
  - Bahādur-Sulṭān
- Yaʿqūb
- Bakhtiyār

== Genealogy ==
- Genghis Khan
- Jochi
- Tuqa-Timur
- Kay Timur
- Abay
- Numqan
- Qutluq Tīmūr
- Tīmūr Beg
- Tīmūr Qutluq
- Tīmūr Khan
- Küchük Muḥammad

== Bibliography ==
- Gaev, A. G., "Genealogija i hronologija Džučidov," Numizmatičeskij sbornik 3 (2002) 9-55.
- Howorth, H. H., History of the Mongols from the 9th to the 19th Century. Part II.1. London, 1880.
- Počekaev, R. J., Cari ordynskie: Biografii hanov i pravitelej Zolotoj Ordy. Saint Petersburg, 2010.
- Sabitov, Ž. M., Genealogija "Tore", Astana, 2008.
- Seleznëv, J. V., Èlita Zolotoj Ordy: Naučno-spravočnoe izdanie, Kazan', 2009.
- Tizengauzen, V. G. (trans.), Sbornik materialov otnosjaščihsja k istorii Zolotoj Ordy. Izvlečenija iz persidskih sočinenii, republished as Istorija Kazahstana v persidskih istočnikah. 4. Almaty, 2006.

Regnal titles
Preceded by Ulugh Muḥammad	Khan of the Golden Horde; 1433–1459	Succeeded by Maḥmūd and Aḥmad
