= Qasim I of Astrakhan =

Khan of Astrakhan from 1466 to 1490

Qasim I

Khan of the Tatar Astrakhan Khanate
- Reign: 1466–1490
- Predecessor: Mahmud Astrakhani
- Successor: Abdal-Karim Khan Astrakhani
- Born: unknown
- Died: 1500

Qasim I Khan (Turki/Kypchak and Persian: قاسم خان اول; died 1500) was a ruler of the Astrakhan Khanate in 1466–1500. He was crowned after the death of his father, Mäxmüd of Astrakhan.

Qasim gave refuge to Muhammad Shaybani and his brother Mahmud Sultan, allowing Shaybani to go on to reconquer most of the lands held by his grandfather, Abu'l-Khayr Khan.

Qasim I of Astrakhan House of Borjigin (Боржигин)
Regnal titles
Preceded by Mahmud bin Küchük	Khan of Astrakan; 1466–1490	Succeeded by Ghabdelkarim of Astrakhan
