= Astrakhan Khanate =

1466–1556 Tatar khanate

Khanate of Astrakhan
- 1466–1556
- Astrakhan Khanate in 1466–1556
- Capital: Astrakhan (Xacitarxan)
- Official languages: Chagatai language, Kypchak
- Common languages: Kipchak languages
- Religion: Sunni Islam
- Government: Khanate
- Astrakhan Khan
  - 1466: Makhmud Astrakhan
  - 1554–1556: Darwish Ghali
- History
  - Established: 1466
  - Russian conquest: 1556
Preceded by
Golden Horde
Nogai Horde
Succeeded by
Tsardom of Russia
Kalmyk Khanate
Nogai Horde
- Today part of: Russia

The Khanate of Astrakhan was a Tatar rump state of the Golden Horde. The khanate existed in the 15th and 16th centuries in the area adjacent to the mouth of the Volga river, around the modern city of Astrakhan. Its khans claimed patrilineal descent from Toqa Temür, the thirteenth son of Jochi and grandson of Genghis Khan.

Mahmud bin Küchük established the Khanate in the 1460s. The capital was the city of Xacitarxan, also known as Astrakhan in Russian chronicles. Its territory included the Lower Volga valley and the Volga Delta, including most of what is now Astrakhan Oblast and the steppeland on the right bank of Volga in present-day Kalmykia. To the south was the Caspian Sea, to the east the Nogai Horde, and to the west Nogais who were theoretically subjects of the Crimean Khanate.

== Before the Khanate ==
The area was a natural center since it was the intersection of the north–south trade route down the Volga to Persia and the east–west trade route north of the Caspian. From the sixth century it was populated by various Turkic-speaking tribes. They formed two states: Old Great Bulgaria (c. 632–668) and the Khazars (c. 650–969). Following the Mongol conquest the western steppe broke off and became the Golden Horde (c. 1240–1502). In the fifteenth century parts of the Horde broke off as follows: 1438: Khanate of Kazan, 1441: Khanate of Crimea, 1466: Astrakhan, 1480: Russia. The steppe remnant ended in 1502 and steppe peoples around Astrakhan became the Nogai Horde.

== Demography and society ==
Most of the population of the Astrakhan khanate were Astrakhan Tatars and Nogais. Merchants carried on a transit trade between Muscovy, Kazan, Crimea, Central Asia, and the Transcaucasus region.

The nobility consisted of feudal ranks, which were, from highest to lowest: the khan, sultans, begs, and morzalar. The rest of the population were known as qara xalıq, ('black people', or more accurately in Old Turkic, "great creation" implying 'the creatures at large" or common folks, when "qara" stood for "big" and "great" not just black, and "aq" (white), stood also for delicate, small, dainty etc.), the standard Turkic designation for commoners.

The state religion was Sunni Islam. With its conquest by the Russians in 1556, Sunni Islam was largely replaced by Russian Orthodox Christianity, though the region to this day is home to a Sunni Muslim minority. The Kalmyks are largely Buddhist.

== History ==
Location of the Astrakhan Khanate and main Asian polities c. 1500

The Astrakhan khanate is poorly documented. According to Frank "The dates and activities of these rulers are faintly represented in the sources, when they are represented at all." About all we have is an imperfect khan list with uncertain regnal dates and a few military and diplomatic events and traveler's reports. The capital was Xacitarxan, which the Russians called Astrakhan, 12 km north of modern Astrakhan. After the conquest, the town and name were moved to the present location.

The khanate is said to have been founded in 1466, but did not become fully separate from the Golden Horde until the Horde's end in 1502. In 1459 the Golden Horde ruler Küchük Muhammad died and power was split between his sons Ahmed Khan bin Küchük, the man who lost Russia in 1480, and Mahmud bin Küchük who was based around Astrakhan. The khanate was founded either by Mahmud or his son Qasim I. The khans of Astrakhan were all descended from Mahmud or his brother Ahmed. It was visited by Ambrogio Contarini in 1476. Howorth (only) says it was besieged by Ahmed and Ibak Khan some time before 1480. It was twice briefly occupied by Crimea (Mehmed I Giray in 1523 and Sahib I Giray in 1549). The khanate traditionally had military and diplomatic relations with Crimea, the Nogais and sometimes the Circassians. Diplomatic contact with Moscow began in 1532 or earlier. About this time Moscow was expanding east toward Kazan which it conquered in 1552. It also was gaining the power to exert force down the Volga between Kazan and Astrakhan, something that is not explained in the sources. In 1551, Yamghurchi of Astrakhan made a nominal submission to Moscow. He soon changed sides and allied with Crimea and the Nogais. Russia sent 30,000 troops against him. In 1554 he fled the town and Russia imposed its client Dervish Ali Astrakhani who soon began intriguing with the Crimeans. Russia sent more troops and occupied Astrakhan in 1556, proceeding to destroy the largest slave market on the Volga. In 1558, Astrakhan was moved 12 km south to its present location. In 1569, the Ottomans were unable to capture Astrakhan.

== See also ==
- Astrakhan Tatars
- List of Khans of Astrakhan
- List of Sunni Muslim dynasties

== Sources ==
- Henry Hoyle Howorth (1880) History of the Mongols, part 2, pp. 349–362.
- Allen J. Frank (2009) Cambridge History of Inner Asia, pp. 253–255.
