= Temür Qutlugh =

Khan of the Golden Horde from 1397 to 1399

Tīmūr Qutluq
- Opening lines of a Jarlig issued by Temür Qutlugh on 6 Shaʿban 800 AH (24 April 1398 CE), in Khorezmian Turkic written in Old Uyghur and Arabic scripts. The first line begins with Tīmūr Qutlugh söz-üm (“Temür Qutlugh, my word”).

Khan of the Golden Horde
- Reign: 1397–1399
- Predecessor: Tokhtamysh
- Successor: Shādī Beg
- Born: c. 1370
- Died: 1399
- Issue: Tīmūr; Pūlād
- Dynasty: Borjigin
- Father: Tīmūr Beg
- Religion: Islam

Temür Qutlugh or Tīmūr Qutluq (Kypchak: تمور قوتلق; (Note: Possibly also تمور قوتلو) Turki and Persian: تیمور قتلغ; c. 1370 – 1399) was Khan of the Golden Horde from 1397 to 1399.

== Ancestry ==
According to the detailed genealogies of the Muʿizz al-ansāb and the Tawārīḫ-i guzīdah-i nuṣrat-nāmah, Tīmūr Qutluq was the son of Tīmūr Beg, the son of Qutluq Tīmūr, the son of Nūmqān, the son of Abāy, the son of Kay-Timur, the son of Tuqa-Timur, the son of Jochi, the son of Chinggis Khan. Older scholarship and its derivatives, relying on the inaccurate information of Muʿīn-ad-Dīn Naṭanzī (previously known as the "Anonymous of Iskandar"), erroneously identified Tīmūr Qutluq's father as Tīmūr Malik, the son of Urus Khan. The confusion seems to have arisen from the similarity of names, given that the elements compounded with "Tīmūr" in the personal names of these individuals are all princely titles (khan, malik, beg).

== Life ==
It is possible that Tīmūr Qutluq's father, Tīmūr Beg, had ruled briefly in 1368 (if identical with the numismatically attested Ūljāy Tīmūr), and that his grandfather, Qutluq Tīmūr, had briefly contested the throne of Sarai with Mamai's protégé ʿAbdallāh sometime earlier in the 1360s (if identical with a like-named khan mentioned only by Ibn Khaldun). Tīmūr Qutluq was a member of the court of his distant cousin, Tokhtamysh Khan, and supposedly desired to seize the throne. Tokhtamysh discovered Tīmūr Qutluq's designs and intended to kill him, but Tīmūr Qutluq fled to Timur (Tamerlane). This happened before 1388, when Tīmūr Qutluq participated in the Timurid invasion of Tokhtamysh's Khwarazm; Tīmūr Qutluq was one of the four captains of the Timurid vanguard. In 1391, Tīmūr Qutluq again participated in a Timurid campaign against Tokhtamysh and the Battle of the Kondurcha River. After the Timurid return home, Tīmūr Qutluq and his mother's brother Edigu remained behind in the Golden Horde, ostensibly to recruit additional troops for the Timurid army.

Instead of returning to Timur (Tamerlane), however, Tīmūr Qutluq and Edigu sought to take over the Golden Horde for themselves, with Tīmūr Qutluq as khan and Edigu (a non-Jochid) as chief emir (beglerbeg). The ongoing war between Tokhtamysh and Timur (Tamerlane) allowed them to achieve this goal. The date of Tīmūr Qutluq's proclamation as khan is somewhat unclear, but may be as early as 1391. While they coordinated with each other, at times they divided their forces in pursuit of different objectives, demonstrating that Tīmūr Qutluq was more than a mere puppet of his uncle Edigu. Edigu appears to have come to terms with Tokhtamysh, finding a modus vivendi that left the territory west of the Volga to Tokhtamysh, and that east of the river to Edigu and Tīmūr Qutluq. By 1396, after another Timurid invasion of the Golden Horde, Tokhtamysh, had fled to Lithuania, Tīmūr Qutluq reigned in the east with (old) Astrakhan and Saray-Jük, and the Timurid protégé Quyurchuq, a son of Urus Khan, reigned at the traditional capital Sarai. Tīmūr Qutluq and Edigu expelled Quyurchuq and took over Sarai in 1396 or 1397. Now Tīmūr Qutluq had the additional prestige of possessing the traditional capital, Sarai, although the city was devastated by the Timurid invasion.

Although Tīmūr Qutluq had ostensibly triumphed, Tokhtamysh regrouped and invaded from Lithuania. In 1397, he besieged Genoese Kaffa in the Crimea, and in 1398 he recovered possession of Sarai in Edigu's absence, gleefully advertising his apparent success through his emissaries. However, he was quickly defeated by Tīmūr Qutluq and Edigu, and fled once more to Lithuania. Tīmūr Qutluq and Edigu now re-established their control over the southwest, besieging Kaffa in their turn, and receiving the submission of the local population. When Tīmūr Qutluq demanded that the Lithuanian Grand Prince Vytautas extradite Tokhtamysh, he received an ominous refusal: "I will not give up Tsar Tokhtamysh, but wish to meet Tsar Temir-Kutlu in person." In the summer of 1399, Vytautas and Tokhtamysh set out to invade the Golden Horde with a large army. On the Vorskla River they encountered the forces of Tīmūr Qutluq, who opened negotiations, intending to delay the engagement until Edigu could arrive with sizable reinforcements. In the process, Tīmūr Qutluq pretended to agree to submit to Vytautas and pay him annual tribute, but requested a three-day delay to consider Vytautas' further demands. This was sufficient for Edigu to arrive with his reinforcements. Edigu could not resist the temptation to bandy words with the Lithuanian ruler himself, and arranged a meeting, separated by the course of the river. Edigu declared that he approved of his khan's concessions, given that Vytautas was more aged than him, but that since Edigu was older than Vytautas, he was owed Vytautas' submission and annual tribute. Negotiations having proven pointless, the two forces engaged in the Battle of the Vorskla River on 12 August 1399. Using a feigned retreat tactic, Tīmūr Qutluq and Edigu were able to envelop the forces of Vytautas and Tokhtamysh, inflicting a serious defeat on them. Tokhtamysh fled the battlefield and made his way east to Sibir; Vytautas survived the battle, although two of his cousins fell in the fight. With the enemy in retreat, Tīmūr Qutluq and Edigu ravaged the country far and wide as far as Lutsk, receiving ransoms from the fortified towns, most notably Tīmūr Qutluq extorted 3000 rubles from Kiev. Shortly after contributing to this victory, Tīmūr Qutluq died, allegedly of drunkenness, in late 1399 or possibly 1400.

== Descendants ==
According to the Tawārīḫ-i guzīdah-i nuṣrat-nāmah (the Muʿizz al-ansāb accidentally misplaces the genealogical connections), Tīmūr Qutluq had four sons and two daughters.

- Tīmūr, khan in 1410–1412, father of Küchük Muḥammad Khan
- Pūlād, khan in 1407–1410
- Nāṣir
- Yādigār
- Makhdūm-Sulṭān
- Bardar-Sulṭān (or Sarwar-Sulṭān)

== Genealogy ==
- Genghis Khan
- Jochi
- Tuqa-Timur
- Kay-Timur
- Abay
- Numqan
- Qutluq Tīmūr
- Tīmūr Beg
- Tīmūr Qutluq

== See also ==
- List of khans of the Golden Horde

== Bibliography ==
- "Темир, ханы Золотой орды" . Brockhaus and Efron Encyclopedic Dictionary (in Russian). 1906.
- Bosworth, C. E., The New Islamic Dynasties, New York, 1996.
- Gaev, A. G., "Genealogija i hronologija Džučidov," Numizmatičeskij sbornik 3 (2002) 9-55.
- Howorth, H. H., History of the Mongols from the 9th to the 19th Century. Part II.1. London, 1880.
- May, T., The Mongol Empire. Edinburgh, 2018.
- Počekaev, R. J., Cari ordynskie: Biografii hanov i pravitelej Zolotoj Ordy. Saint Petersburg, 2010.
- Reva, R., "Borba za vlast' v pervoj polovine XV v.," in Zolotaja Orda v mirovoj istorii, Kazan', 2016: 704–729.
- Sabitov, Ž. M., Genealogija "Tore", Astana, 2008.
- Sagdeeva, R. Z., Serebrjannye monety hanov Zolotoj Ordy, Moscow, 2005.
- Seleznëv, J. V., Èlita Zolotoj Ordy: Naučno-spravočnoe izdanie, Kazan', 2009.
- Tizengauzen, V. G. (trans.), Sbornik materialov, otnosjaščihsja k istorii Zolotoj Ordy. Izvlečenija iz arabskih sočinenii, republished as Istorija Kazahstana v arabskih istočnikah. 1. Almaty, 2005.
- Tizengauzen, V. G. (trans.), Sbornik materialov otnosjaščihsja k istorii Zolotoj Ordy. Izvlečenija iz persidskih sočinenii, republished as Istorija Kazahstana v persidskih istočnikah. 4. Almaty, 2006.
- Vohidov, Š. H. (trans.), Istorija Kazahstana v persidskih istočnikah. 3. Muʿizz al-ansāb. Almaty, 2006.
- "Тимер Котлыгъ". Tatar Encyclopaedia (in Tatar). Kazan: The Republic of Tatarstan Academy of Sciences. Institution of the Tatar Encyclopaedia. 2002.

Preceded by Tokhtamysh	Khan of the Golden Horde; 1397–1399	Succeeded by Shādī Beg
