= Great Stand on the Ugra River =

1480 battle between the Great Horde and the Grand Duchy of Moscow

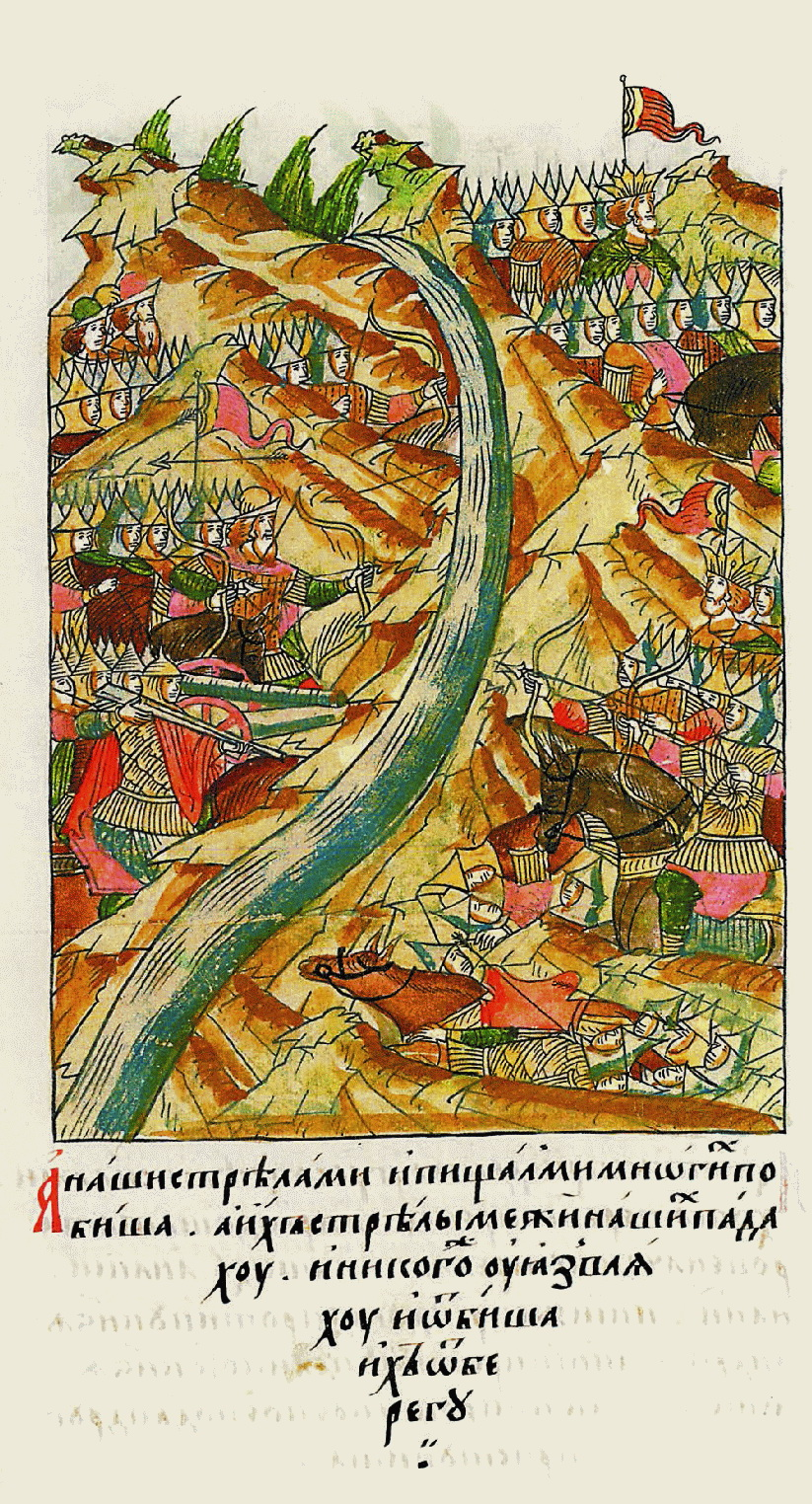
- Miniature in Russian chronicle, 16th century
Date	8 October – 11 November 1480
Location	Ugra River banks (now in Kaluga Oblast, Russia)
Result	Russian victory

Belligerents
Grand Duchy of Moscow	Great Horde

Commanders and leaders
Ivan III of Russia; Ivan Molodoy; Andrey Menshoy	Ahmed Khan bin Küchük

The Great Stand on the Ugra River (Russian: Великое стояние на Угре) or the Standing on the Ugra River, also known as the Battle of the Ugra, was a standoff in 1480 on the banks of the Ugra River between the forces of Akhmat Khan of the Great Horde, and Grand Prince Ivan III of the Grand Duchy of Moscow.

After Ivan III stopped paying tribute to the Horde, Akhmat Khan led an army towards Moscow, leading to a standoff between the two armies on the banks of the river. Akhmat Khan waited for his Lithuanian reinforcements to arrive, but they never did, with one Mongol attempt to cross the river failing leading Akhmat Khan to retreat. Both armies departed after little fighting. Nevertheless, the outcome of the campaign corresponded to the strategic plan of the Russians to defend the capital and the border from the Tatars.

In Russian historiography, it has been interpreted as the end of the "Tatar yoke" in Russia, though some historians believe that the event itself was insignificant and did not change Russo-Tatar relations. Nevertheless, the event is usually regarded as the end of nominal Tatar suzerainty over Russia.

This did not end the threat from the Tatars to the Russians. For example, the Tatars under Devlet I Giray managed to burn Moscow in 1571, only to be defeated at the Battle of Molodi later that year.

== Background ==
The main Russian defence line ran along the Oka River from Kaluga east toward Nizhny Novgorod. At Kaluga the Oka bends sharply from north to east and the defense line was extended westward along the Ugra River. The land west and south of Kaluga was claimed by Lithuania. At this time Ivan III was uniting the lands north of the Oka. At the same time the Golden Horde was breaking up and the steppe remnant came to be called the Great Horde. Casimir IV Jagiellon of Poland-Lithuania was allied with the Great Horde, while Muscovy was allied with the Crimean Khanate against the Horde. In 1472 Akhmed of the Great Horde raided the Oka at Aleksin but was driven off. In 1476 Russia officially stopped paying tribute to the Tatars. In late 1479 Ivan quarreled with his brothers, Andrey Bolshoy and Boris of Volotsk, who began intriguing with Casimir. This internal conflict may have influenced Akhmed's decision to attack.

== Campaign ==
Blue: Ugra River. Yellow and Red: Oka River.
Labeled red squares are military centers during the war.
Black X's are Ivan's bases at Kremenets and Borovsk.
Akhmed's base at Vorotynsk was just south of the Ugra-Oka junction

In late May news of the pending invasion reached Moscow. Nesin (2015) says it was the largest Tatar army in the fifteenth century. One faction wanted to flee north, but was overruled. In June Ivan sent troops south to the Oka: to Serpukhov under his son Ivan the Young, to Tarusa under his brother Andrey the Less, and under Ivan himself to Kolomna. Tatar scouting parties soon appeared south of the Oka. Russian outposts reported that Akhmed was tending northwest so Russian troops were moved west toward Kaluga. Forces from Tver moved toward the Ugra. Around 30 September Ivan returned to Moscow to meet with his bishops and boyars and major decisions were made. The quarrel with his brothers was settled and their troops began moving toward the Oka. The state treasury and royal family were moved north to Beloozero, and some cities were evacuated. Vasily Nozdrovaty and the exiled Crimean khan Nur Devlet were sent east down the Oka and Volga to attack Akhmed in the rear. (Note: What happened does not seem to be well documented. Some sources have him reaching Sarai. Karamzin thought that this influenced Akhmed's withdrawal, but Nesin thinks he was unaware of it or paid no attention.) Meanwhile, Akhmed had moved northward between the upper Don and Oka and at an uncertain date made camp at Vorotynsk just south of the Ugra-Oka junction on the west bank of the Oka. Here he waited for Casimir, who never came. Casimir was tied down fighting the Crimeans in Podolia, but he may have had other reasons for not coming. On 3 October Ivan moved to Kremenets (now Kremenskoye in modern Medynsky District) to watch the front. Nesin (2015) gives the Russian front as 60 versts (kilometers), but does not specify its start and end points.

On 6–8 October Akhmed moved his troops up to the Ugra. Fighting began at one o'clock on the eighth and continued for almost four days. Attempts to cross the river failed, largely because of Russian missiles, and because the river was wide enough to make Tatar arrows ineffective. The battlefield extended five kilometers along the Ugra from its mouth westward. Akhmed withdrew two versts (kilometers) south to a place called Luza. He then tried to secretly move his troops to a place called 'Opakhov', but his movement was detected and the crossing blocked. Ivan began negotiations with Akhmed, which led nowhere, but gave Ivan time to bring up more troops. Both sides spent the next month watching each other across the river.

It was getting late in the season and both sides knew that once the river froze solid it would no longer be a barrier. Akhmed could concentrate his forces and break the thin Russian line at any point. Ivan's best plan was to pull back and concentrate his force. On 26 October Ivan began moving troops from the Ugra northeast to Kremenets and then east to Borovsk. Here he had a good defensive position to protect Moscow and could strike in any direction if Akhmed chose to advance. Akhmed expected Casimir IV Jagiellon to join him with Lithuanian reinforcements, but Casimir faced a revolt at home and never came. Instead of advancing, on 8 November Akhmed began to withdraw. News of the retreat reached Ivan on 11 November. In his retreat, Akhmed raided twelve Lithuanian towns, including Mtsensk. His son Murtaza raided some villages south of the Oka until the Russians drove him off. On 28 November Ivan returned to Moscow. In January 1481 Akhmed was killed by Ibak Khan.

== Reasons for Akhmat's withdrawal ==
Nikolay Karamzin wrote: "It should have been an odd image: two armies ran away from each other, not pursued by anyone", but it is now clear that the two withdrawals were independent. Ivan's motive is clear, but Akhmat's motives are a matter of guesswork. Casimir's failure to appear was clearly important. Nesin thinks that a major factor was the end of Ivan's quarrel with his brothers and the resulting additional troops. The impending Russian winter was a consideration. The longer the standoff lasted, the more troops Ivan could bring up, while Akhmat's reserves were few and far away. The Tatar horses, and the sheep they drove with them for food, gradually consumed the local fodder. There are reports of disease in his army. Akhmat may have thought Ivan's withdrawal was a ruse to draw him into an ambush, a common steppe tactic. Even if there were no ambush, he would have to fight an army in a prepared position, or try to bypass it. The Tatars preferred hit-and-run raids, and Akhmat may not have wished to attack a concentrated army. The sources do not explain why he did not try to outflank the Russian line by moving west. His wise, but seemingly cowardly, withdrawal probably contributed to his death a few months later.

== Aftermath ==
On 6 January 1481, Akhmat Khan was killed in a clash with the Nogais under Ibak Khan, a princeling from the Khanate of Sibir. In 1502, Crimea destroyed the Great Horde as an organization, thereby removing the buffer between Russia and Crimea and leading to a series of Russo-Crimean Wars that lasted until 1784.

For the next century, relations between the Russians and Mongols continued to rapidly change, with both launching incursions and attacks against the other. In 1521, the Crimean Khanate plundered southern Russia and almost reached Moscow. Both Russia and Lithuania allied with different khanates before moving to another.

== Legacy ==
According to Russian historiography, the event marked the end of Russian dependency on Tatar overlords. On the other hand, some modern historians regard the confrontation as indecisive, and not having a significant effect on Muscovite–Tatar relations. Charles Halperin mentioned that "Moscow had probably ceased paying tribute to the Great Horde sometime in the 1470s" yet continued formal relations for 20 more years and continued to pay tribute of some sort to other khanates at times. Janet Martin dismissed the significance of the standoff as "embellished". However, one significant change was that no Russian prince needed to ask for permission again from a Tatar khan to rule.

Some of the earliest Russian sources mentioning the event include:

- The Epistle to the Ugra (Russian: Послание на Угру, romanized: Poslanie na Ugru), written by Vassian Patrikeyev, bishop of Rostov and confidant of Ivan III.
- The anonymous Epistle to Ivan IV (dated c. 1550s), attributed to Macarius, Metropolitan of Moscow or the priest Sylvester.
- The anonymous Kazan Chronicle (Russian: Казанская летопись, romanized: Kazanskaia letopis) alias Kazan History (Russian: Казанская история, romanized: Kazanskaia istoriia) (dated c. 1560s).

== See also ==
- Battle of Kulikovo
- Battle of Molodi

== Sources ==
- Alexeev, Yuri (2009). Походы русских войск при Иване III [Campaigns of Russian troops under Ivan III] (in Russian). St. Petersburg University Press. ISBN 978-5-288-04840-1.
- Auty, Robert; Obolensky, Dimitri (1976). Companion to Russian Studies: Volume 1: An Introduction to Russian History. Cambridge University Press. ISBN 978-0-521-28038-9.
- Borrero, Mauricio (2009). Russia: A Reference Guide from the Renaissance to the Present. Infobase Publishing. ISBN 978-0-8160-7475-4.
- Bushkovitch, Paul (2012). A concise history of Russia. New York: Cambridge University Press. pp. 42–43. ISBN 978-1139033206.
- Halperin, Charles J. (1987). Russia and the Golden Horde: The Mongol Impact on Medieval Russian History. Bloomington: Indiana University Press. p. 192. ISBN 978-0253013668.
- Keller, Shoshana (2020). Russia and Central Asia: Coexistence, Conquest, Convergence. University of Toronto Press. ISBN 978-1-4875-9434-3.
- Khodarkovsky, Michael (2002). Russia's Steppe Frontier: The Making of a Colonial Empire, 1500–1800. Bloomington: Indiana University Press. ISBN 0253339898.
- Kort, Michael (2008). A Brief History of Russia. Infobase Publishing. ISBN 978-1-4381-0829-2.
- Martin, Janet (1995). Medieval Russia: 980–1584. New York: Cambridge University Press. ISBN 0521362768.
- Moss, Walter G. (2003). A History of Russia Volume 1: To 1917. Anthem Press. ISBN 978-1-84331-023-5.
- Nesin, M.K. "On the Reasons for the Withdrawal of Tatar Troops after the Ugra Standoff", 2015, in Russian: http://www.reenactor.ru/ARH/PDF/Nesin_05.pdf (avoid further links to milhist.info which is not secure)
- Perrie, Maureen; Pavlov, Andrei (2014). Ivan the Terrible. Routledge. ISBN 978-1-317-89468-1.
