= Ibak Khan =

Khan of the Siberian Khanate (1468-1495), Shaybanid descendant of Genghis Khan

Ibak
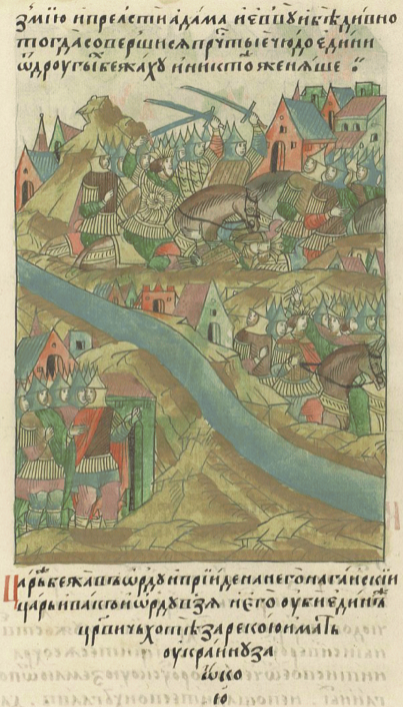
- Ibak Khan's killing of Ahmed Khan of the Great Horde

Khan of Sibir
- Reign: 1468 — 1495
- Coronation: 1468
- Predecessor: Abu'l-Khayr Khan
- Successor: Mamuq
- Died: 1495
- Issue: Kuluk; Murtaza
Names
- Sayyid Ibrahim Khan; Persian: سید ابراهیم خان
- House: Borjigin
- Dynasty: Shaybanid
- Father: Mahmudaq
- Religion: Islam

Ibak Khan, born Sayyid Ibrahim Khan (Turki/Kypchak and Persian: سید ابراهیم خان; died 1495) was a Shaybanid khan of Sibir about whom the sources are contradictory. He is also called Abak, Ivak, Ibaq, Khan of Tyumen, and possibly Said Ibrakhim Khan.

With the breakup of the Golden Horde the regional powers were the Nogais south of the Urals, the Shaybanids southeast of the Urals and the Taibugas in the forested lands to the east. The last two alternated control over the Khanate of Sibir. From about 1428, the Shaybanid Abu'l-Khayr Khan killed the Siberian Khan, Hajji Muhammad and established a brief empire that stretched from Sibir to the Syr Darya. As people and power drifted southeast, the remaining Shaybanids coalesced around Ibak (Allworth, p. 47). In 1464 (many sources), or after Abu’l Khayr’s death in 1468 (Forsyth.p25) or about 1480 (Grosset) Ibak, with the help of the Nogais, killed Mar, the Taibugid Khan, and became the Khan of Sibir.

At some date, the Nogai brothers Musa and Yamgurchi were at war and Yamgurchi invited Ibak from Tyumen. He appeared along the Volga claiming to have a better right to rule the Great Horde than Ahmed Khan (Howarth, p. 980). At the time of the Ugra standoff Ibak may have has some arrangement with Moscow to threaten Ahmed in the rear. In 1481 Ibak and Yamgurchi (and Musa?) killed Ahmed Khan on 6 January 1481. (Khodarkovsky in a footnote implies that there is some doubt about the details). In 1495 (most common), or 1494, or 1493 (Grosset, p. 489) Ibak was killed by Mamut, a grandson of Mar (Howarth, p. 981), who then became Khan of Sibir.

His son Murtaza was a power on the Steppe after 1502. His grandson Kuchum was the last Khan of Sibir. His younger brother Mamuk was briefly (1495–96) Khan of Kazan.

== See also ==
- List of Sibir khans

Ibak Khan Shaybanid
Preceded by Abu'l-Khayr Khan	Khan of Sibir; 1468–1495	Succeeded by Murtaza
