= Xacitarxan =

Capital of the Khanate of Astrakhan

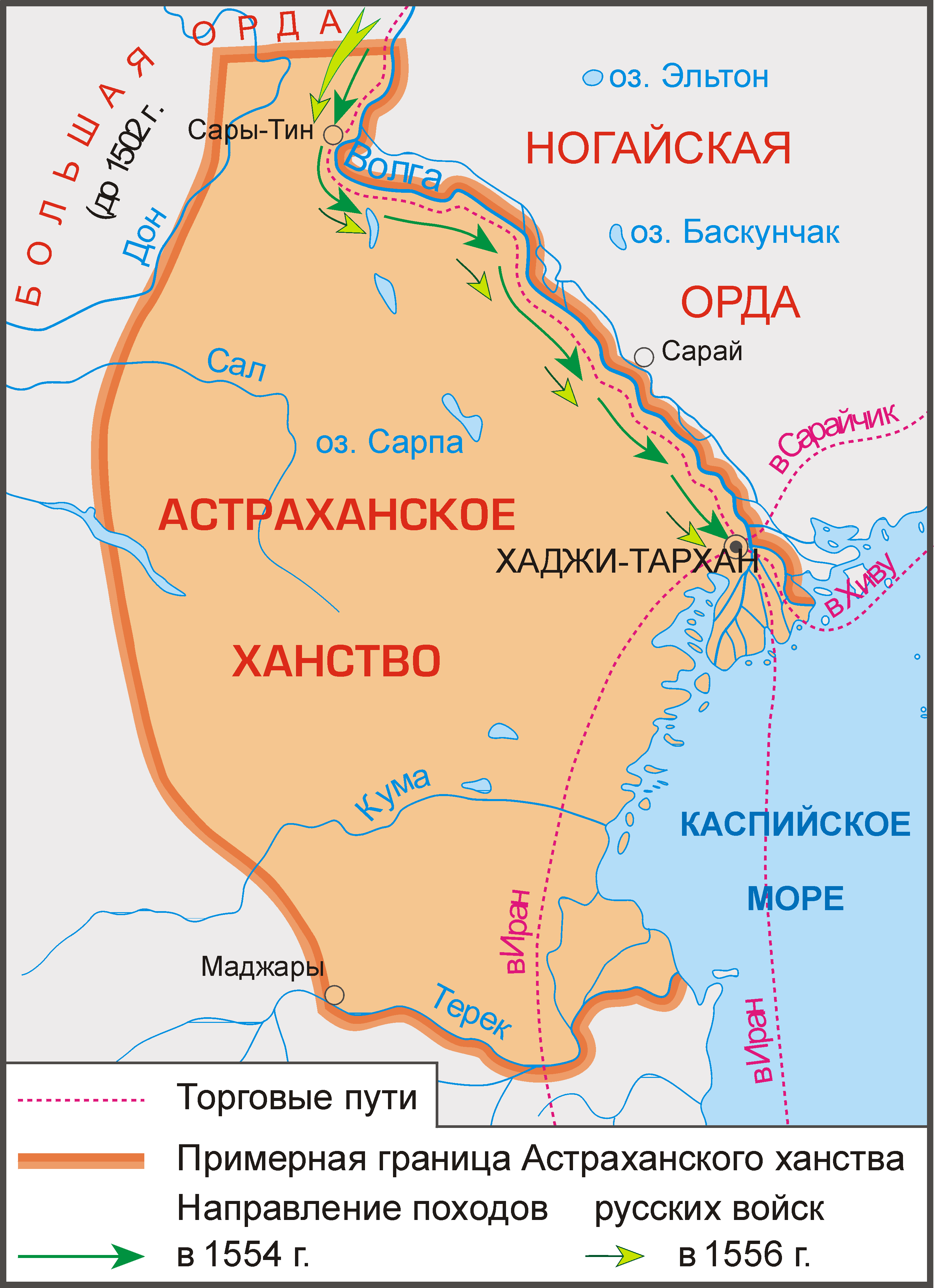

Hajji Tarkhan or Hajji Tarkhan al Jedid (Turki/Kypchak and Persian: حاجی ترخان, Tatar: Хаҗитархан, romanized: Xacitarxan), also known as Hashtar Khan / Astarxan (Tatar: Astarxan) or Astrakhan, was a medieval city at the right bank of Volga, situated approximately 12 km north of the modern city of Astrakhan. The first mention of the town was recorded in 1333. In the 13th and 14th centuries, it was one of the main trade and political centres of the Golden Horde. In 1395, the city was sacked by Timur. Astrakhan was rebuilt afterwards and became the capital of the Khanate of Astrakhan in 1459. In 1547, the city was seized by the Crimean khan Sahib I Giray. In 1556, Astrakhan was captured by Ivan the Terrible, shortly after his capture of Kazan in 1552.

== See also ==
- Saqsin
- Atil
