= Ahmed Khan bin Küchük =

Khan of the Great Horde from 1465 to 1481

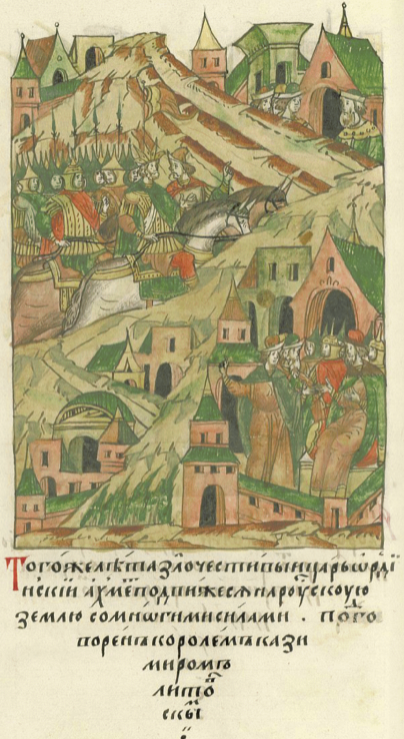
- Ahmed Khan marches on Russia, miniature from the Illustrated Chronicle of Ivan the Terrible, 1568

Khan of the Great Horde
- Reign: 1465 – 6 January 1481
- Predecessor: Mahmud bin Küchük
- Successor: Sheikh Ahmed
- Died: 6 January 1481; Sarai
- Spouse: Badi' al-Jamal
- Issue: Sheikh Ahmed
- Dynasty: Borjigin
- Father: Küchük Muhammad
- Religion: Sunni Islam

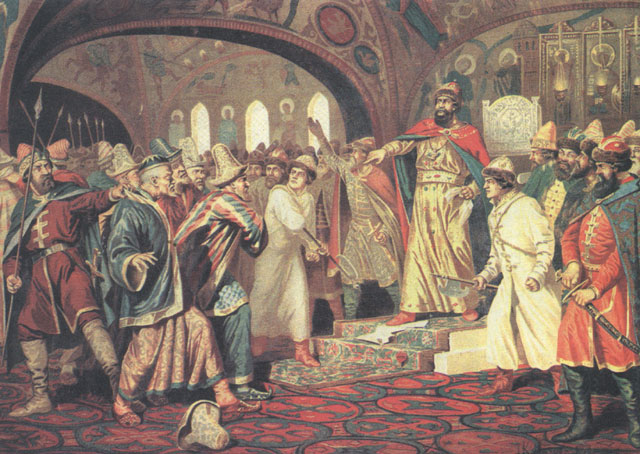
Ivan III tears up the Khan's missive letter demanding a tribute in front of the Khan's mission, painting by Aleksey Kivshenko, c. 1879

Ahmed Khan bin Küchük (Turki and Persian: احمد خان) was Khan of the Great Horde from 1465 to 1481.

== Reign ==
In the 1460s, Ahmed was a co-ruler with his brothers. In 1465, Ahmed Khan seized power in the Horde by rising against his brother Mahmud bin Küchük, who had been its ruler since 1459.

Ahmed Khan attempted to subdue the former subjects of the Golden Horde, including the Russians and Uzbeks, with his goal being to once again unite the realm. He sought an alliance with the Polish and Lithuanian ruler Casimir IV so that he could launch a campaign against the Ottomans, but after Casimir IV refused to ally with him, Ahmed Khan was forced to negotiate with the Ottoman ruler, Mehmet II. His nephew won the throne of Crimea in 1476, but in less than two years, the throne was lost to Meñli I Giray, who allied with the Ottomans.

Due to Ivan III's refusal to pay tribute since the start of his reign in 1462, Ahmed Khan launched several expeditions to Russia in an attempt to force the grand prince of Moscow to recognize his suzerainty. Ivan III also began the process of unifying the Russian principalities, which would strengthen Moscow's position against the Horde and Lithuania. In 1479, Ahmed Khan sent his tax collectors to Moscow, but Ivan III again refused to pay. As a result, Ahmed Khan began preparing for a military confrontation and coordinated his campaign with the Polish–Lithuanian ruler.

Ahmed and his army stopped on the banks of the Ugra River, approximately 150 miles (240 km) south of Moscow, and stayed there in what became known as the Great Stand on the Ugra River from the spring to the fall of 1480. Ahmed waited for his Lithuanian reinforcements, which never came. In November, he was forced to withdraw after receiving the news that Russian princes had rebelled against Casimir and were moving towards Sarai. As a result, Ahmed lost the support of his forces. The Shaybanid Siberian ruler Ibak Khan took advantage of Ahmed's situation and attacked the Great Horde. In January 1481, Ahmed was killed in battle.

== Personal life ==
Ahmed Khan's wife was the Timurid princess Badi' al-Jamal, a sister of Sultan Husayn Bayqara of Khorasan. Through this marriage he had two sons, Mahmud Khan and Bahadur Khan, as well as a daughter, Khanzada Khanum. However, Badi' al-Jamal eventually left the Horde and returned with her children to her brother's court in Herat.

== Genealogy ==
- Genghis Khan
- Jochi
- Orda Khan
- Sartaqtay
- Köchü
- Bayan
- Sasibuqa
- Ilbasan
- Chimtay
- Urus
- Temur-Malik
- Temür Qutlugh
- Temur ibn Temur Qutlugh
- Küchük Muhammad
- Ahmed Khan bin Küchük

== Bibliography ==
- Favereau, Marie; Pochekaev, Roman Yu. (2023). "The Golden Horde, c. 1260–1502". The Cambridge History of the Mongol Empire. Cambridge University Press. pp. 243–318. ISBN 978-1-107-11648-1.
- Kołodziejczyk, Dariusz (2011). The Crimean Khanate and Poland-Lithuania: International Diplomacy on the European Periphery (15th-18th Century): A Study of Peace Treaties Followed by Annotated Documents. Leiden: Brill. ISBN 9789004191907. Archived from the original on 2017-06-30.

Ahmed Khan bin Küchük House of Borjigin (Боржигин) (1206–1635)
Regnal titles
Preceded by Mahmud bin Küchük	Khan of the Great Horde; 1465–1481	Succeeded by Sheikh Ahmed
