= Of Suzdal =

Toponymic epithet

Of Tver is a toponymic epithet associated the Principality of Suzdal or the city of Suzdal. Notable people with this epithet include:

- Aleksandr of Suzdal
- Andrey of Suzdal
- Boris of Suzdal
- Dmitry of Suzdal
- Eudoxia of Suzdal
- Konstantin of Suzdal
- Mikhail of Suzdal
- Sophia of Suzdal
- Vasily of Suzdal
- Yury of Suzdal

== See also ==
- Prince of Suzdal
