= Of Vladimir =

Toponymic epithet

Of Vladimir is a toponymic epithet associated with the Principality of Vladimir or the city Vladimir. Notable people with this epithet include:

- Alexander III of Vladimir
- Andrei I of Vladimir
- Andrey II of Vladimir
- George I of Vladimir
- George II of Vladimir or Yuri II of Vladimir
- Mikhail of Vladimir
- Serapion of Vladimir
- Sviatoslav III of Vladimir
- Yaroslav II of Vladimir

== See also ==
- Grand Prince of Vladimir
