= Mikhail of Suzdal =

Prince of Suzdal from 1279 to 1305

Mikhail Andreyevich
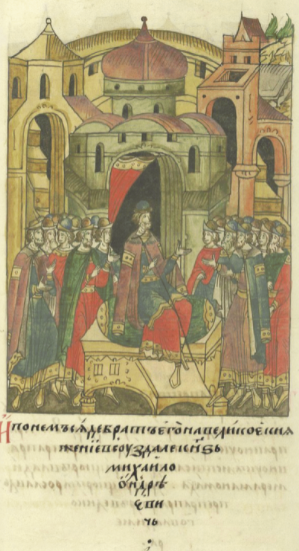
- Miniature from the Illustrated Chronicle of Ivan the Terrible (16th century)

Prince of Suzdal
- Reign: 1279–1305
- Predecessor: Yury
- Successor: Vasily
- Died: 1305
- Issue: Vasily of Suzdal (possibly)
- House: Rurik
- Father: Andrey II of Vladimir

Mikhail Andreyevich (Russian: Михаил Андреевич; died 1305) was Prince of Suzdal from 1279 to 1305. He was the son of Andrey Yaroslavich. According to other versions, he was the son of Andrey Aleksandrovich.

== Reign ==
According to the Nikon Chronicle, Mikhail was the son of Andrey Yaroslavich. Mikhail resided in Gorodets until 1279, when his old brother Yury died and Mikhail became the prince of Suzdal. In 1305, according to several Russian chronicles, (Note: The Novgorod Fourth Chronicle, the Sofia First Chronicle, the Yermolin Chronicle, and the Moscow svod of 1479.) Mikhail married a Tatar woman and stopped at Nizhny Novgorod in order to put to death those vechniki, or residents, who were responsible for the murder of the boyars of the late grand prince, Andrey. In other versions, it was Mikhail of Tver who executed them. He died the same year and was succeeded by Vasily.

== See also ==
- Family tree of Russian monarchs

== Bibliography ==
- Feldbrugge, Ferdinand J. M. (2 October 2017). A History of Russian Law: From Ancient Times to the Council Code (Ulozhenie) of Tsar Aleksei Mikhailovich of 1649. BRILL. ISBN 978-90-04-35214-8.
- Fennell, John (2023) [1968]. The Emergence of Moscow, 1304–1359. University of California Press. ISBN 978-0-520-34759-5.
- Pudalov, B. M. (2004). Русские земли Среднего Поволжья (вторая треть XIII – первая треть XIV в.) [Russian lands of the Middle Volga region (second third of the 13th to first third of the 14th centuries)] (in Russian). Nizhny Novgorod: Комитет по делам архивов Нижегородской области. ISBN 5-93413-023-4.
