= Ivan I of Moscow =

Prince of Moscow from 1325 to 1340

Ivan I
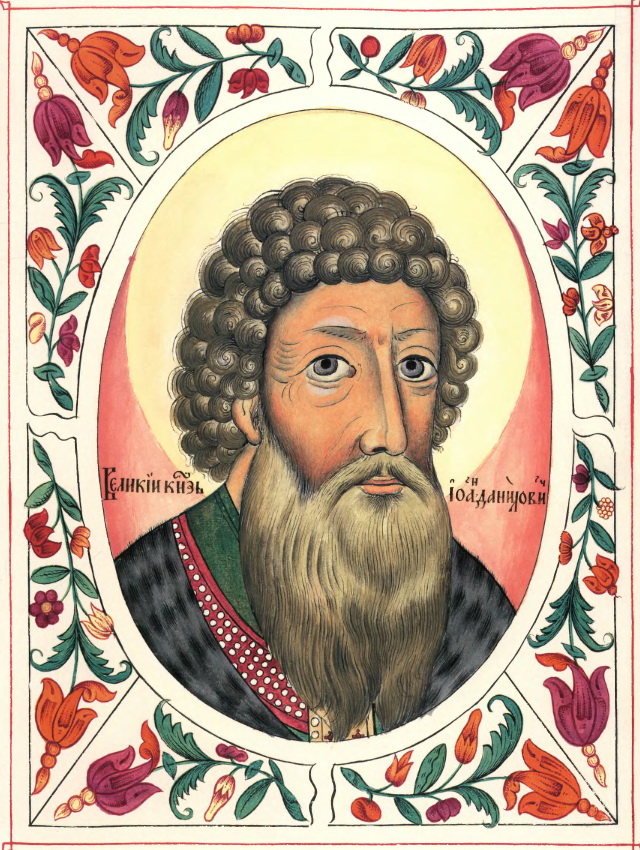
- Portrait in the Tsarsky titulyarnik (1672)

Prince of Moscow
- Reign: 1325–1340
- Predecessor: Yury
- Successor: Simeon

Prince of Novgorod
- Reign: 1328–1337
- Predecessor: Alexander of Tver
- Successor: Simeon of Moscow

Grand Prince of Vladimir
- Reign: 1331–1340
- Predecessor: Alexander of Suzdal
- Successor: Simeon of Moscow
- Born: c. 1288; Moscow
- Died: 31 March 1340 (aged 51); Moscow
- Burial: Cathedral of the Archangel
- Issue more...: Simeon of Moscow; Ivan II of Moscow
- House: Rurik
- Father: Daniel of Moscow
- Religion: Russian Orthodox

Ivan I Danilovich Kalita (Russian: Иван I Данилович Калита, lit. 'money bag'; c. 1288 – 31 March 1340) was Prince of Moscow from 1325 and Grand Prince of Vladimir from 1331 until his death in 1340.

Ivan inherited the Moscow principality following the death of his elder brother Yury. In 1327, following a popular uprising against Mongol rule in the neighboring principality of Tver, Ivan and Aleksandr of Suzdal were dispatched by Özbeg Khan of the Golden Horde to suppress the revolt and apprehend Aleksandr of Tver, who ultimately escaped. The following year, the khan divided the grand principality between Ivan and Aleksandr of Suzdal. Upon the death of the latter in 1331, Ivan became the sole grand prince. His heirs would continue to hold the title almost without interruption before the thrones of Vladimir and Moscow were permanently united in 1389.

As the grand prince, Ivan was able to collect tribute from other Russian princes, allowing him to use the funds he acquired to develop Moscow. At the start of his reign, Ivan forged an alliance with Metropolitan Peter, head of the Russian Church, who then moved his primary residence to Moscow from the former capital, Vladimir. This decision would allow Moscow to become the spiritual center of Russian Orthodoxy. Peter was succeeded by Theognostus, who supported Moscow's rise and sanctioned the construction of additional stone churches in the city. Aleksandr of Tver was executed at the Horde in 1339, marking the end of a 35-year-long struggle between the princes of Moscow and Tver. Ivan died the following year and was succeeded by his son Simeon.

== Early life ==
Ivan Danilovich was the fourth son of Daniel of Moscow, the first prince of Moscow and founder of the Moscow branch of the Rurikid dynasty. Daniel was the youngest of the four sons of Alexander Nevsky, who had reigned as the grand prince of Vladimir. The grand prince held the formal role of both the leading prince and symbolic leader of the nation, and, once the Mongol Golden Horde established its dominance, the Mongol khans saw it beneficial to support the grand prince as long as he remained loyal.

Ivan was named after John the Baptist. The origin of Ivan's mother is not known, but a 17th-century liturgical text from Rostov implies that she was called Agrippina. It is not known when exactly Ivan was born, as the birth of Daniel's fourth son was seen by chroniclers as insignificant. He may have been born on 1 October—the feast day of Saint Ananias—because he would take monastic vows under the name Ananias. According to the historian Nikolay Borisov, Ivan was likely born around 1288, as Daniel appointed Ivan to represent him in Novgorod in 1296—Ivan's grandfather Alexander Nevsky had been sent to Novgorod at the age of eight, while Nevsky himself had sent his son Dmitry to the city when Dmitry was around nine years old. Ivan's appointment is the first mention of his political activity in surviving sources. The Novgorodians invited Daniel to reign in their city after the veche (popular assembly) had expelled the governors of his older brother Andrey. Ivan was sent to Novgorod to rule on his father's behalf. His time in Novgorod was brief, as in 1298, the Novgorodians invited Andrey back.

Daniel died on 5 March 1303 and was succeeded by his eldest son Yury as prince of Moscow. As Daniel died before becoming grand prince, his descendants were excluded from the title under the traditional practice of collateral succession. However, in 1318, Yury was made grand prince by Özbeg Khan. Four years later, he lost the title to Dmitry of Tver when he chose to lead the defense of Novgorod against Sweden instead of delivering the tax receipts directly to the khan.

== Reign ==
=== Rise to power ===
Ivan inherited the Moscow principality after Yury was murdered in 1325 by Dmitry of Tver in revenge for Dmitry's own brother Mikhail's death. The title of grand prince went to Alexander of Tver. Dmitry was executed on the order of Özbeg Khan the following year. In 1327, Özbeg sent his deputy to Tver to test Alexander's loyalty. Russian chronicles say that the deputy intended to make himself ruler and destroy the Christian faith, though whatever his intention was, he mistreated the locals and provoked a revolt. The residents of Tver killed the deputy and his delegation. Upon hearing the news of the massacres of Tatars, Ivan set off to the khan with the expectation that he would be given the patent for the grand princely title. Instead, he was given a Tatar army and ordered to lead a punitive force, along with Alexander of Suzdal, to sack Tver. Alexander of Tver then fled to Pskov and Ivan was unable to bring him back to the khan. In 1328, Özbeg divided the grand principality between Alexander of Suzdal and Ivan. Due to his failure to deliver Alexander of Tver to the khan, Ivan was not made the sole grand prince. Alexander of Suzdal ruled the eastern portion, including Vladimir, and was presumably granted the grand princely title, while Ivan controlled Novgorod and Kostroma.

Ivan's next attempt at bringing Alexander of Tver to the khan took place in the summer of 1328. The Pskovites recognized Alexander as their prince and signed an agreement with him promising "not to hand him over to the Russian princes". At the behest of Ivan, Metropolitan Theognostus excommunicated Alexander and the Pskovites. According to the chronicle of Pskov, Alexander stated: "O my brothers and friends, let not this curse and excommunication be upon you because of me. I shall leave your city, and your oath to me and my oath to you shall no longer be valid". After extracting a promise from the Pskovites that his wife would be cared for, Alexander left Pskov for Lithuania in 1329. At the end of 1331, Alexander of Suzdal died. Ivan immediately set off to the khan and was made grand prince. According to John L. I. Fennell, the khan's change in attitude toward Ivan can be explained by the fact that Ivan had proven himself to be an ideal servant by his "willingness to carry out the khan's commands". The khan continued to reward the princes of Moscow with the title of grand prince, so Ivan's heirs retained the title almost without interruption before the thrones of Vladimir and Moscow were permanently united in 1389.

Like his father, Ivan began incorporating the patrimonial principalities of other princes into his own domain to continue reversing the trend of territorial fragmentation that had led to the emergence of many new principalities from the Vladimir grand principality. In particular, Ivan would be credited by his grandson Dmitry Donskoy in his will with purchasing the principalities of Beloozero, Galich and Uglich. Although some scholars do not believe that Ivan actually purchased those principalities, his daughters were arranged to marry the princes of Beloozero, Yaroslavl and Rostov. Some historians, including Nikolay Karamzin, Sergey Solovyov, Vasily Klyuchevsky, Alexander Presnyakov, and others, have suggested alternative theories. These include the ideas that the principalities were bought by Ivan and attached to the grand princely domain, rather than being part of the patrimony of the princes of Moscow, while the princes of those districts retained proprietary rights; that those princes sold their independence on the condition they be allowed to remain; or that Ivan's grandson referred to them as his "grandfather's purchases" to lend legal justification for acquiring them. Nevertheless, the process of adding territories near Moscow to the domain of the grand prince would be continued by his successors.

Ivan also developed Moscow to attract people and produce the resources need to maintain his position. As grand prince, Ivan collected tribute from not only his own possessions but also from other Russian princes. Özbeg shifted from his previous policy of exploiting rivalries among the princes, allowing Ivan to maintain his dominance, partly due to Ivan's cooperation with the khan, but primarily because of the emerging threat from Lithuania in the West. Ivan used his funds to have the Mongols of the Golden Horde release captives so that they could be settled in the Muscovite domain. Ivan also had access to Novgorod's wealth; despite resistance from Novgorod, scholars broadly agree that Moscow's dominance in Novgorod allowed the princes of Moscow to pay the tribute required by the khan, who then continued to reward them with the title of grand prince.

=== Religious affairs ===
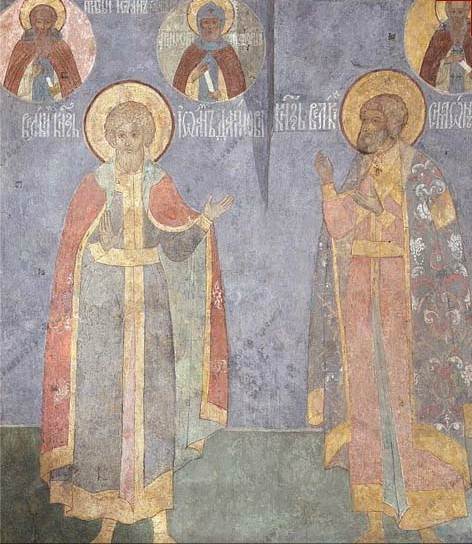
Fresco of Ivan Kalita and his son Simeon in the Cathedral of the Archangel in Moscow, 1652–1666

The Russian Orthodox metropolitan, Peter, allied himself with the prince of Moscow and began looking for a new residence, where he singled out Moscow despite the fact it was "small and had a small population", according to his biographer Cyprian. He then writes that the city of Moscow "was ruled by the pious Grand-prince Ivan, son of Daniel, grandson of the blessed Alexander [Nevsky], whom the blessed Peter saw resplending in Orthodoxy, merciful to the poor, honouring the holy churches of God and the clergy, loving divine Scriptures, well instructed in the teachings of the books. So the holy hierarch of God [Peter] loved him very much". Peter established his residence in Moscow, at the start of Ivan's reign. During Peter's tenure in Moscow, Ivan laid the foundation for the first stone church in Moscow, the Dormition Cathedral, on 4 August 1326. Peter intended to make Moscow his burial place and the religious center of the country, and he died there on 20 December 1326. Moscow became the new spiritual center of Russian Orthodoxy.

Peter was succeeded by Theognostus, who, like his predecessor, supported the rise of the Moscow principality. During the first four years of his tenure, Moscow continued to develop as masonry building progressed, leading to the completion of the Dormition Cathedral and four additional stone churches. During the reign of Grand Duke Gediminas of Lithuania, a separate metropolitanate was established in Lithuania, likely soon after his accession; however, by the end of 1331, Theognostus was able to restore ecclesiastical control over Lithuania and he closed the metropolitan sees of Galicia and Lithuania, thus frustrating the efforts of Gediminas at territorial expansion. Theognostus also proceeded with the canonization of Peter in 1339, and requested an official document from John Calecas, the patriarch of Constantinople, to sanction Peter's liturgical veneration, which helped to increase Moscow's prestige. This request to the patriarch was a demonstration by Theognostus of his loyalty and allegiance to the patriarch. Theognostus also remained the sole metropolitan "of all Russia" for the rest of his tenure and he received the title of exarch from the patriarch — a designation reserved for only senior Byzantine metropolitans and not granted to his successors.

According to the historian John L. I. Fennell, it may be questioned whether Theognostus was acting primarily in the interests of the ecumenical patriarch or wholly identified himself with Moscow's political aspirations; however, "it cannot be denied that he proved the staunch and effective friend of Ivan of Moscow and a thorn in the flesh of Gedimin of Lithuania". He also says that Theognostus likely enjoyed at least some support or protection from Özbeg Khan during Ivan's reign. According to the theologian John Meyendorff, most Byzantine diplomats and ecclesiastics were distrustful of Lithuania and believed that Moscow's policy of appeasing the Mongols better matched Byzantine interests.

=== Relations with other princes ===
No copies of the treaties with local princes have survived; as a result, there is largely only indirect evidence available to determine the relationship between Ivan and princes of the "Lower lands", a term found in the chronicles which refers to the principalities within Vladimir-Suzdal that had been distributed among the descendants of Vsevolod III from the 13th century onward. These include several key events: military campaigns by "all the princes of Suzdal" under Ivan's command, his right to purchase land, and the management of princely patrimonies and dynastic marriages under Muscovite administration. According to later genealogical records, the principality of Rostov, which was originally the largest of the territories distributed by Vsevolod III, was split in 1328 between Fyodor and Konstantin, the sons of Vasily Konstantinovich, after Konstantin married Ivan's daughter Maria. There are no records of any disobedience from Konstantin to his father-in-law and he became the sole ruler after Fyodor died in 1331. Epiphanius the Wise, the biographer of Sergius of Radonezh, also portrays Rostov as something akin to a province of Moscow.

Other princes, including those of Yuryev-Polsky, Starodub, Galich and Dmitrov, ruled quietly and in peace with Ivan and the khan. The only princes who displayed any signs of opposition to Ivan were Vasily Davidovich of Yaroslavl and Roman Mikhailovich of Beloozero, both princes of districts that had separated from Rostov, who may have been partisans of Alexander of Tver, as the chronicle of Novgorod mentions that both princes were summoned at the same time as Alexander in 1339. Ivan concluded dynastic marriages with the two houses, and there is little evidence to suggest that those princes were able or willing to provide any more resistance.

The Ryazan principality was under the influence of Moscow during the first decade of the 14th century; however, almost nothing is known about relations with Ryazan during the next 30 years, except that some kind of compact existed with the princes of Ryazan. Ryazan's status was not lowered to semi-dependent as the prince of Ryazan still collected the vykhod (tribute) and brought this to the khan, not to the grand prince. According to Presnyakov, during the reign of Ivan Korotopol as the prince of Ryazan, there was "significant and increasing independence of the principality of Ryazan in relation to the Great-Russian grand-princely centre".

=== Relations with Novgorod ===
Due to Metropolitan Theognostus restoring ecclesiastical control over Lithuania, Gediminas began to actively interfere in the affairs of Moscow. The surviving brothers of the exiled Tverite prince Alexander, Konstantin and Vasily, were loyal servants of Ivan, while the republic of Pskov had retained close links with Lithuania during the 1320s; however, Novgorod had shown sympathy for Moscow and antipathy for Tver throughout most of the early 14th century. Novgorod's pro-Moscow orientation during the first 30 years of the century may be explained by the political leanings of the archbishops of Novgorod, David (r. 1309–1325) and his successor Moisey (r. 1325–1330). The archbishops of Novgorod were considered the representative of the people of Novgorod, and his position among Russian clergy was undisputed as the head of the largest diocese and the senior prelate after the metropolitan. Following Moisey's retirement in 1330, Novgorod's attitude towards Moscow changed for the worse following the election of Vasily as archbishop.

Ivan placed pressure on Novgorod as the sole grand prince, collecting not only regular tribute payments but also additional payments, possibly due to the Golden Horde requiring increased revenue during its wars against the Ilkhanate. According to Fennell, the conflict between Moscow and Novgorod was not due to Novgorod refusing to make payments, as some scholars have suggested, but because Ivan did not tolerate Novgorod's change in policy, and he was likely aware of an agreement between the archbishop-elect and Gediminas. The archbishop and his advisers had agreed to hand over districts in the northern border region to Narimantas (Narimunt), son of Gediminas, and they had virtually agreed to a defensive alliance. As a result, Ivan entered the Novgorodian border town of Torzhok on 6 January 1333 with an army made up of troops from Ryazan and detachments sent by "all the princes of the Lower lands". After he ordered the removal of his governors from Novgorod, he proceeded to "ravage the district of Novgorod... until the first Sunday in Lent". The city of Novgorod itself was not attacked, nor were the Novgorodian armies likely challenged, which, according to Fennell, showed "a certain hesitancy in his behaviour, perhaps a lack of confidence both in himself and in the support he could count on from the Horde".

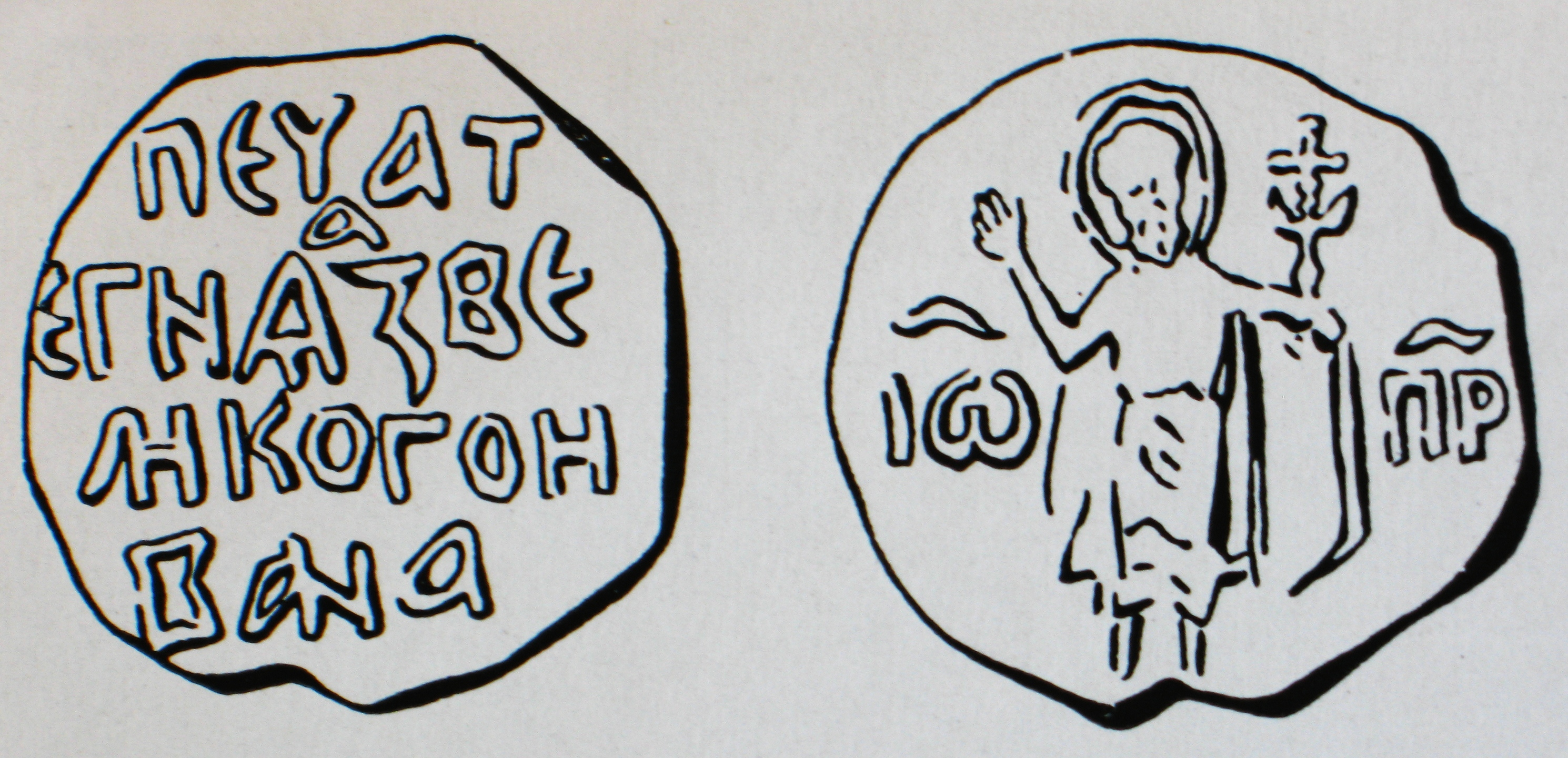
Seal of Ivan Kalita

As the agreement between Archbishop Vasily and Gediminas had not yet been implemented and Novgorod was left without any military protection, two embassies were sent to Ivan to request a temporary peace and to withdraw his troops. The first was led by Lavrenty, the archimandrite of the Yuryev Monastery, and the second was led by Vasily, who offered Ivan 500 rubles. Ivan refused, leading to Vasily to seek support from Lithuania. Vasily arrived in Pskov, where he was received "with great honour", and he christened the son of Alexander of Tver, despite Alexander's excommunication by the metropolitan. In October 1333, Narimantas arrived in Novgorod, where he was received "with honour" and given the districts in the northern border region. He also signed a treaty, pledging complete support to Novgorod. Although Novgorod did not become an integral part of the Lithuanian grand duke's domains, it paved the way for a pro-Lithuanian faction in Novgorod's boyar and merchant classes.

The first steps at reconciliation between Moscow and Novgorod were taken by Metropolitan Theognostus in 1334, who had summoned Vasily to his residence in Vladimir, leading to a Novgorodian delegation to be sent to Ivan and for an agreement to be reached: "Grand Prince Ivan bestowed his favour upon his patrimony Novgorod the Great [and] forgave them their hostility". Ivan entered Novgorod in February 1335 and was recognized as their prince again. The former archbishop Moisey also returned in 1335 and was allowed to lay the foundation stones of two new churches. Ivan's first recorded act was to organize an attack on Pskov with "the Novgorodians and all the Lower land" in an attempt to force out Alexander of Tver from his stronghold; however, Ivan was forced to cancel his plans after the Novgorodians refused to join him in his campaign. The Lithuanians also responded to Novgorod breaking the treaty between them by launching a raid on the district of Torzhok in the summer of 1335. Ivan retaliated by burning the towns of Osechen and Ryasna in the semi-autonomous principality of Rzhev, which was under Lithuanian control, "and many other fortresses as well"; however, there is no mention in sources of any Novgorodian participation, suggesting that Novgorod intended to maintain neutrality. Ivan requested for a Novgorodian delegation to visit him, after which the archbishop, posadnik and tysyatsky met him in Moscow, but the chronicler does not mention that any agreement was reached.

Despite mutual hostility between the factions in Novgorod, Ivan's governors were able to maintain peace throughout the following year; however, another popular uprising emerged at the start of 1337 and was directed against the pro-Moscow archimandrite of the Yuryev monastery. According to the official account, "the common people (prostaya chad') rose up against Archimandrite Esif; and they held a veche and locked up Esif in the church of St. Nicholas; and the disturbers of the peace (koromolnitsi) sat around the church for a night and a day watching over him". Ivan and his governors perceived the uprising as a hostile act and launched a failed expedition to the Northern Dvina, a possession of Novgorod. According to Fennell, "the primary cause of action, whether this action was dictated by Uzbeg or was spontaneous, must surely be sought in Novgorod's intractability, in the strength of her pro-Lithuanian faction–amply demonstrated by the disturbances of 1335 and early 1337–and her refusal to co-operate against Aleksandr of Tver'". The pro-Moscow archimandrite was replaced with Lavrenty, which was an indication of the strength of the pro-Lithuanian faction in the city.

The Novgorodians eventually sought reconciliation with Moscow as Gediminas chose to not get involved in Novgorod's affairs, despite Swedish attacks in the north and Novgorod's request for assistance. According to Fennell, "we can only assume that... Narimunt had been helping his uncle Voin to defend Lithuania's easternmost dependent principality, Polotsk. As well as conducting a war with the Germans, the Lithuanians were also obliged to defend themselves against the Tatars in 1338". In 1339, Ivan sent his youngest son, Andrey, to Novgorod as a symbolic expression of his continued authority. Motivated by either greed or simply acting on the khan's orders, Ivan demanded another payment from the Novgorodians after accepting the tribute brought by Novgorod's ambassadors, which was refused by Novgorod. At the end of 1339 or the start of 1340, Ivan removed his governors from Novgorod one last time; however, he died before he could take his next steps to apply pressure on Novgorod. As a result, the influence of the pro-Lithuanian faction was not diminished and Ivan was unable to provide an attractive alternative to Lithuanian protection.

=== Final victory over Tver ===
Alexander of Tver returned to Pskov in 1331 or 1332 with the end goal of recovering his principality as well as possibly the grand principality. He continued to rule in Pskov for the next four or five years, but nothing is known about his reign, with the sources making no mention of any open hostility between Pskov and Moscow or the Teutonic Knights. In 1334 or early 1335, Alexander sent his son Fyodor to the Horde; he returned to Tver rather than Pskov in 1335 with a Tatar official, staying there for at least a year. It is not known why Fyodor returned to Tver instead. Alexander visited Tver in the winter of 1336, and the chronicles simply state that he brought his son back to Pskov; however, historians have suggested other purposes. Henryk Paszkiewicz thinks that Alexander may have gone to Tver to make peace with his brother Konstantin, who had been ruling Tver under the watch of Ivan, his wife's uncle, while Lev Cherepnin says that he went "to find out the attitude of the local boyars, servants and townsfolk towards him". In the same year, Ivan had made a trip to the Horde, which was likely to bring back instructions to Alexander.

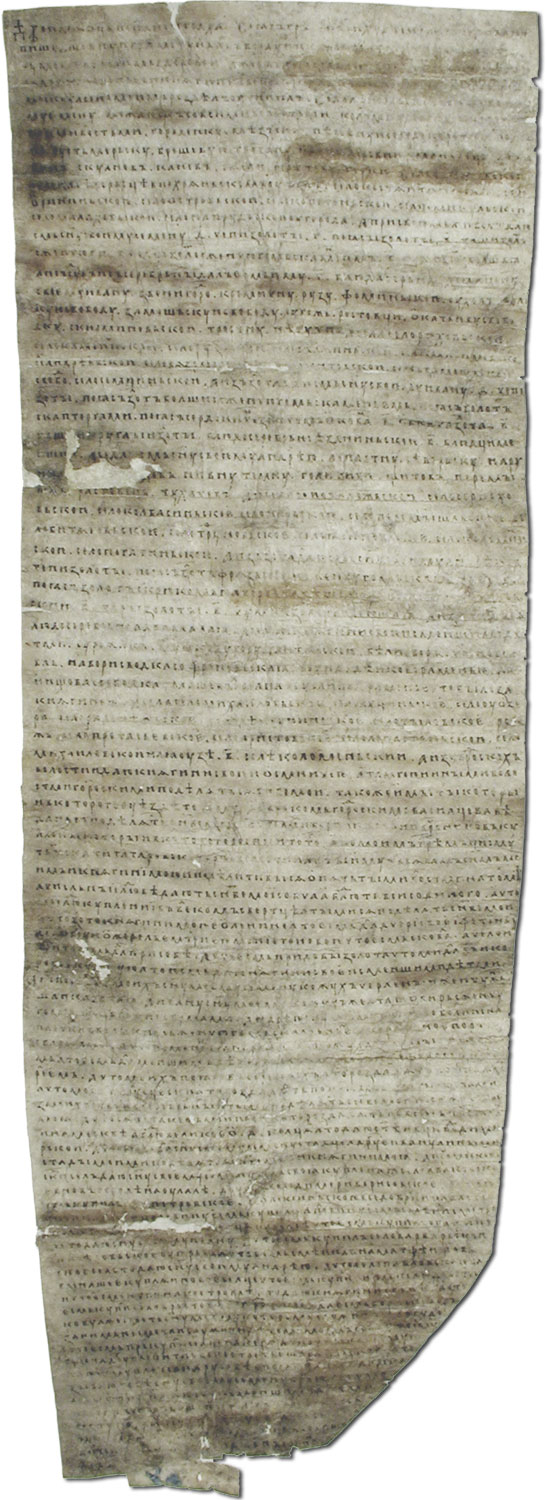
Ivan's testament, c. 1339

After being persuaded by Ivan and the Tatar official, Alexander was convinced that it would be safe for him to visit the Horde. Alexander made contact with Theognostus and sent his boyars to the metropolitan "for the sake of his blessing and his prayers", according to the Tverite chronicler, although it is likely that Alexander sought protection from the church. Although the archbishop of Novgorod had warned Alexander to not visit Sarai during his visit to Pskov, Alexander "refused judgement" and the archbishop left the city "having anathematized Pskov", as the Novgorodian chronicler writes.

During his visit to Sarai, Alexander was granted a full pardon and the right to return to Tver. Some historians believe that Alexander was reinstated in an attempt to weaken Moscow. According to Lev Cherepnin, "the Horde was scared by the swift rise of the principality of Moscow" and the khan may have been displeased with the methods that Ivan used to collect tribute; however, he also wrote: "perhaps the khan was also guided by the wish to remove Aleksandr from the sphere of influence of the grand principality of Lithuania". Fennell says that "the situation closely resembled that of 1326", in which Alexander "was permitted to return to Tver' in order that he might discredit himself in the eyes of the Tverites–and indeed of any other Russians who might witness his predicament–and thus ultimately bring about his own destruction". According to Fennell, an immediate execution of Alexander would have antagonized Novgorod, Pskov and Lithuania, as well as possibly any sympathizers among the princes subordinate to Ivan. Fennell also says that Alexander was a danger in the eyes of Ivan and Özbeg "because of his Lithuanian connections and because he represented an extension of Gedimin's power eastward and the encroachment of Lithuanian influence on to Russian soil".

Alexander returned to Tver in the autumn of 1338, in which the chronicles simply state that he was given permission to resume his activities as prince and that he had called for his spouse and children from Pskov. The Rogozhsky Chronicle says: "It was in autumn and the population (khristianom) suffered greatly. And many boyars departed to Grand Prince Ivan in Moscow". Alexander had sent his son Fyodor to Sarai as an envoy, and at the same time, Ivan went to the khan. As a result of accusations made by "lawless people" inspired by "that all-cunning wicked counsellor the devil", according to the Tverite chronicle, Özbeg sent an ambassador to Tver ("not with fury but with calm"), who informed Alexander that Özbeg would allow him to bring back his son. Alexander arrived at the Horde at the end of September, and both he and his son were executed on 28 October 1339. The Tverite chronicle does not implicate Ivan in the murder and removes all guilt from Özbeg, while the Novgorod First Chronicle equally blames Ivan and Özbeg. (Note: "On his advice... he (Uzbek) sent Tatars summoning Aleksandr... to the Horde (p. 349). "Khan Uzbek summoned him with deceit intending to kill him... and he listened to the deceitful words of the pagan one and came and [with his son] was killed." (p. 350).) The Trinity Chronicle records the execution as if there was no need to seek justification, and exonerates Ivan.

The execution of Alexander marked the end of a 35-year-long struggle between Moscow and Tver for supremacy and the start of the fragmentation of Tver into lesser districts (udely). Konstantin continued to rule Tver and Ivan transferred the bell from the Transfiguration Cathedral in Tver to Moscow. According to Fennell, "If Uzbek had not succeeded in bringing back Pskov into the orbit of the grand prince of Vladimir, he had at least removed from the political scene the most powerful ally of Gedimin in north-east Russia".

== Death ==
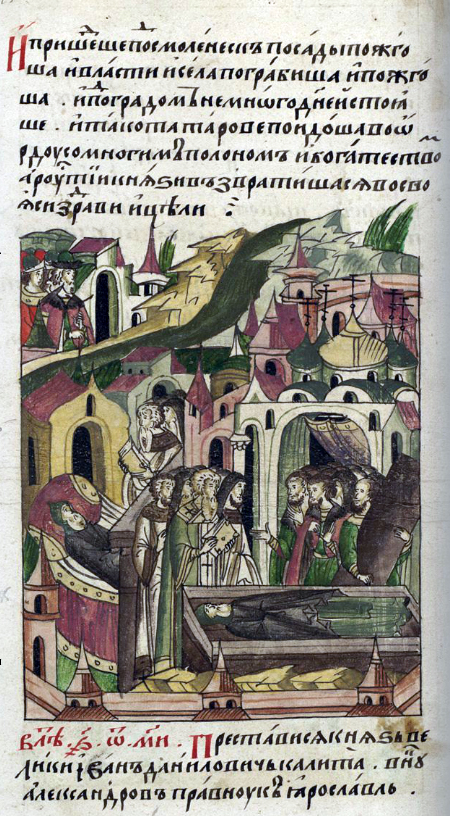
The death of Ivan Kalita, miniature from the Illustrated Chronicle of Ivan the Terrible (16th century)

Ivan drew up his will just before his final visit to the Horde with his two eldest sons. Two copies have survived and were written at the same time. They were probably written in 1339, and the vast majority of his holdings were passed to his three sons, with each son receiving a third of the city of Moscow. His first son, Simeon, received Mozhaysk and Kolomna; (Note: Kolomna was kept in the senior line beginning with this testament.) in total, he received 27 cities, volosts and settlements. (Note: The word "city" is a translation of the Russian word gorod, which refers to the principal type of urban settlement.) His second son, Ivan, received Zvenigorod, Ruza, and a number of villages, for a total of 23 holdings. His third son, Andrey, received Serpukhov, Lopasnya volost, and the Shchitov and Peremyshl burgs, for a total of 21 holdings. Lesser holdings were given to his wife and the "younger children", which included nine volosts, 17 villages, two svobodkas (free settlements), and one settlement (ramenye).

Ivan faced competition from three rivals for the title of grand prince, in accordance with traditional succession practices. These rivals included two princes of Tver and one prince of Suzdal. The yarlyk (patent) was confined to the descendants of Yaroslav Vsevolodovich. As a result, the descendants of the three eldest sons of Yaroslav—Alexander Nevsky, Andrey of Suzdal, and Yaroslav of Tver—had shared the patent between them since the late 13th century. Upon Ivan's death, the throne of Vladimir was expected to pass to the next eldest among the great-grandsons of Yaroslav Vsevolodovich. Ivan therefore refrained from stressing the political seniority of his son Simeon in his will. Instead, Simeon is instructed to look after his family: "I entrust to you, my son Semen, your younger brothers and my princess. You will care for them in God's name". The vagueness of Ivan's will can be explained by what Lev Cherepnin calls his "desire to ensure the grand-princely dignity for his descendants". In 1339, Ivan went to Sarai along with his sons and brought a copy of his will with him, which was approved by the khan.

Ivan died in Moscow on 31 March 1340. He was buried on 1 April at the Church of the Archangel. Ivan had built the church and was also the first person to be buried there. His tomb became an object of veneration, and later generations came to view Ivan as a figure of sanctity.

== Legacy ==
Ivan received his sobriquet, Kalita (lit. 'money bag'), because of his generosity and compassion for the poor, according to some sources. The abbot Paphnutius of Borovsk (d. 1477) told his disciples that Ivan received his sobriquet "for he was very merciful and carried a kalita on his belt, always filled with silver coins, and wherever he went, he gave to the poor as much as could be taken out". Another view supported by Vasily Klyuchevsky says that the sobriquet was given ironically and reflected his stinginess.

The Trinity Chronicle, written in the early 15th-century, borrows the characterization of Ivan that was promoted in his own court and hails his policy of appeasing the Mongols:

[When] grand-prince Ivan Danilovich [Kalita of Moscow] obtained the grand-principality of all Russia, there came a great peace for forty years; the infidels ceased to fight against the land of the Rus' and kill Christians; the Christians found relief and appeasement away from the great troubles, the many oppressions and from Tatar violence, and there was great peace in all the land.

— Trinity Chronicle

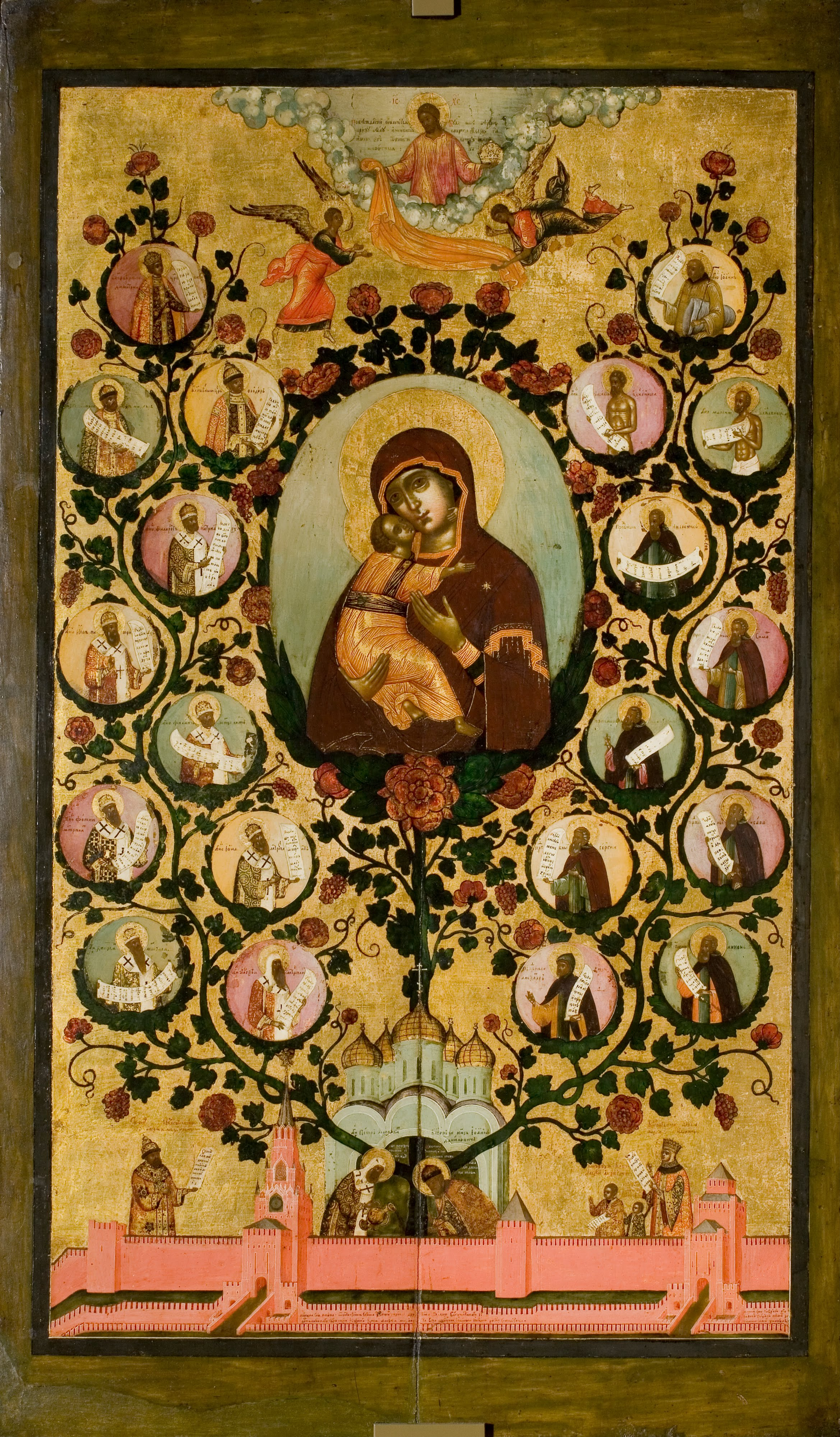
Praise of Our Lady of Vladimir, Tree of the Muscovite State, 17th-century icon by Simon Ushakov. Ivan I is shown at the bottom along with Metropolitan Peter.

The first modern Russian historian, Nikolay Karamzin, gives Ivan the title of "gatherer of the Russian lands" in his Memoir on Ancient and Modern Russia, adding that he was "cunning". Karamzin also says: "A small town, scarcely known before the fourteenth century, long called from contempt for its insignificance 'village Kuchkovo' raised its head and saved the fatherland". Sergey Solovyov in contrast is reserved about his characterization of Ivan, only repeating Karamzin's title and noting that he "rid the Russian land of thieves". Soviet-era historians are more critical of Ivan, following the writings of Karl Marx where he is described as the "Tartar's hangman, sycophant, and slave-in-chief".

According to Vasily Klyuchevsky, after the prince of Moscow received the title of grand prince, a "princely union" was formed around Moscow, which during the reign of Ivan was "financial and bonded". After the transfer of the metropolitan see, Moscow became an ecclesiastical capital before it became a political capital, and as a result, "the rich material resources at the disposal of the Russian Church began to flock to Moscow, helping to enrich it". Klyuchevsky also notes the attitude of the population: "Finally, in the Moscow prince, Northern Russia is accustomed to seeing the eldest son of the Russian Church, the closest friend and collaborator of the main Russian hierarch, to consider Moscow a city on which the special blessing of the greatest saint of the Russian land rests...". Klyuchevsky also characterizes Ivan as a "miserly prince" and says that all the princes of Moscow starting from Ivan were cunning pragmatists who "diligently tended to the khan and made him an instrument for their plans".

Robert O. Crummey says that the greatest of Ivan's victories was the metropolitan moving his residence to Moscow. He says: "From that time on, Moscow was the residence of the head of the Russian Orthodox hierarchy and its princes played the role of primary protectors of the church... Moscow became a pilgrimage centre...". Crummey also says that church leaders had struggled to preserve the unity of the Orthodox hierarchy as the rulers of Lithuania had made repeated attempts to set up a separate metropolis, and as a result, the metropolitan typically backed Moscow's claims to unify their flock due to the belief that appeasing the khan coincided much better with the interests of the church.

According to Christoph Baumer, "Özbeg took a fateful decision when he abandoned the former policy of divide and rule by making the new grand prince responsible for collecting and passing on the tribute and taxes from all the Russian cities. Ivan delivered these exactions punctually, so further strengthening his position of privilege. In this way he laid the foundations for Moscow's future as a regional great power that in the 1380s would challenge the Golden Horde itself".

Hélène Carrère d'Encausse says that thanks to the Mongols, Ivan Kalita received the title of grand prince, "and with it the right to collect tribute from the Russian principalities and administer judgment among the princes. The dream of the founder of Moscow was becoming a reality: his principality was turning into the political center of the country, moreover, the center of gravity of the conquered Russian lands".

== Family ==
Ivan Kalita was married twice. His first wife was called Elena, and nothing is known exactly about her origin. There is a hypothesis that she was the daughter of Alexander Glebovich, the prince of Smolensk. Elena died on 1 March 1331.

A year later, Ivan married again, although all that is known about his second wife is that her name was Ulyana. Vladimir Kuchkin suggests they had two daughters: Maria and Theodosia. They appear in Ivan's will as the "young children". One of them was alive in 1359; nothing more is known about the other.

He had eight children:

- Simeon Ivanovich (7 September 1316 – 27 April 1353), grand prince of Vladimir and Moscow from 1340 to 1353;
- Daniel Ivanovich (11 December 1319 – 1328);
- Fefinia Ivanovna (died in infancy);
- Maria Ivanovna (died 2 June 1365), married to Konstantin of Rostov;
- Ivan Ivanovich (30 March 1326 – 13 November 1359), grand prince of Vladimir and Moscow;
- Andrey Ivanovich (4 August 1327 – 6 June 1353), prince of Novgorod;
  - Vladimir Andreyevich (died 1410);
- Evdokia Ivanovna (1314 – 1342), married to Vasily of Yaroslavl;
- Feodosia Ivanovna (died 1389), married to Fyodor II of Beloozero.

== See also ==
- Family tree of Russian monarchs

== Bibliography ==
- Baumer, Christoph (2016). The History of Central Asia: The Age of Islam and the Mongols. Bloomsbury Publishing. ISBN 978-1-83860-939-9.
- Borisov, Nikolay S. [in Russian] (1995). Иван Калита [Ivan Kalita] (in Russian). Молодая гвардия. ISBN 5-235-02263-7.
- Cherniavsky, Michael (1975). "Ivan the Terrible and the Iconography of the Kremlin Cathedral of Archangel Michael". Russian History. 2 (1): 3–28. doi:10.1163/187633175X00018. ISSN 0094-288X. JSTOR 24649667.
- Crummey, Robert O. (2014). The Formation of Muscovy 1300–1613. Routledge. ISBN 978-1-317-87200-9.
- d'Encausse, Hélène Carrère (2005). L'Empire d'Eurasie: Une histoire de l'Empire Russe de 1552 à nos jours (in French). Fayard. ISBN 978-2-213-64973-3.
- Dmytryshyn, Basil (1991). Medieval Russia: A Source Book, 850-1700. Holt, Rinehart and Winston. ISBN 978-0-03-033422-1.
- Dukes, Paul (1998). A History of Russia: Medieval, Modern, Contemporary, C. 882-1996. Duke University Press. ISBN 978-0-8223-2096-8.
- Favereau, Marie (2021). The Horde: How the Mongols Changed the World. Harvard University Press. ISBN 978-0-674-24421-4.
- Fennell, John (2023). The Emergence of Moscow, 1304–1359. University of California Press. ISBN 978-0-520-34759-5.
- Gorsky, Anton A. [in Russian] (2018). "О династических связях первых московских князей" [On dynastic relations of the first Moscow princes]. Древняя Русь. Вопросы медиевистики (in Russian). 4 (74): 42–51. doi:10.25986/IRI.2018.74.4.004. ISSN 2071-9574.
- Howes, Robert Craig (1967). The Testaments of the Grand Princes of Moscow. Cornell University Press. ISBN 978-0-598-21269-6.
- Martin, Janet (2006). Perrie, Maureen (ed.). The Cambridge History of Russia: Volume 1: From Early Rus' to 1689. Cambridge University Press. pp. 127–157. doi:10.1017/CHOL9780521812276. ISBN 978-1-107-63942-3.
- Hughes, Lindsey (2006). "Art and liturgy in Russia: Rublev and his successors". In Angold, Michael (ed.). The Cambridge History of Christianity: Volume 5, Eastern Christianity. Cambridge University Press. pp. 276–301. ISBN 978-0-521-81113-2.
- Martin, Janet (7 December 1995). Medieval Russia, 980–1584. Cambridge University Press. ISBN 978-0-521-36832-2.
- Karamzin, Nikolay M.; Pipes, Richard (2005). Karamzin's Memoir on Ancient and Modern Russia: A Translation and Analysis. University of Michigan Press. ISBN 978-0-472-03050-7.
- Kuchkin, Vladimir A. (1995). "Первый московский князь Даниил Александрович" [First prince of Moscow Daniil Aleksandrovich]. Отечественная история (in Russian) (1): 93–107. ISSN 0869-5687.
- Meyendorff, John (2010). Byzantium and the Rise of Russia: A Study of Byzantino-Russian Relations in the Fourteenth Century. Cambridge University Press. ISBN 978-0-521-13533-7.
- Moss, Walter G. (2003). A History of Russia Volume 1: To 1917. Anthem Press. ISBN 978-0-85728-752-6.
- Riasanovsky, Nicholas V.; Steinberg, Mark D. (2019). A History of Russia (Ninth ed.). Oxford University Press. ISBN 9780190645588.
- Rowell, S. C. (1994). Lithuania Ascending: A Pagan Empire Within East-Central Europe, 1295–1345. Cambridge University Press. ISBN 978-0-521-45011-9.
- Shaikhutdinov, Marat (2021). Between East and West: The Formation of the Moscow State. Academic Studies Press. doi:10.2307/j.ctv249sgn2. ISBN 978-1-64469-713-9. JSTOR j.ctv249sgn2.

Regnal titles
Preceded by Yury	Prince of Moscow; 1325–1340	Succeeded by Simeon
Preceded by Alexander	Grand Prince of Vladimir; 1331–1340	Succeeded by Simeon
