= Mikhail Khorobrit =

Grand Prince of Vladimir in 1248

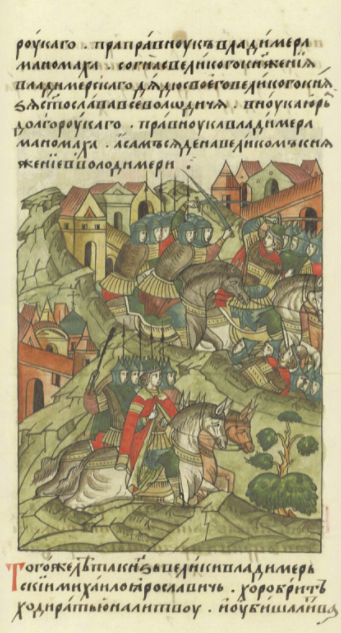
The death of Mikhail Khorobrit, miniature from the Illustrated Chronicle of Ivan the Terrible (16th century)

Mikhail Yaroslavich Khorobrit (Russian: Михаил Ярославич Хоробрит, lit. 'the Brave'; died 15 January 1248) was briefly the grand prince of Vladimir in 1248. He was a younger brother of Aleksandr Nevsky.

Mikhail seized the grand princely throne from his uncle Sviatoslav, but was killed in battle the same year. His brother Andrey was confirmed as grand prince by the khan of the Golden Horde.

== Life ==
Mikhail is sometimes said to have been the first prince of Moscow. Two chronicles refer to him as "Mikhail of Moscow", but Daniel, the youngest son of Aleksandr Nevsky, is usually considered to be the first prince of Moscow. His nickname, Khorobrit, is derived from the Old Russian word khorobrovati (хоробровати, 'to be brave').

In 1248, he seized the town of Vladimir and expelled his uncle Sviatoslav Vsevolodovich, who fled to Yuryev-Polsky. Mikhail was killed fighting Tautvilas and Gedivydas, the nephews of the Lithuanian ruler Mindaugas, at the battle of Protva on 15 January 1248. On Mikhail's death, if it is assumed that an appanage principality was created, Moscow reverted as an escheat to the grand prince. His brother Andrey was confirmed as grand prince by the khan of the Golden Horde.

== See also ==
- Family tree of Russian monarchs

== Sources ==
- "Михаил Ярославич Хороборит" . Brockhaus and Efron Encyclopedic Dictionary (in Russian). 1906.
- Feldbrugge, Ferdinand J. M. (2 October 2017). A History of Russian Law: From Ancient Times to the Council Code (Ulozhenie) of Tsar Aleksei Mikhailovich of 1649. BRILL. ISBN 978-90-04-35214-8.
- Fennell, John (2014) [1983]. The Crisis of Medieval Russia, 1200–1304. Longman History of Russia. Routledge. ISBN 978-0-582-48150-3.
- Fennell, John L. I. (15 November 2023) [1968]. The Emergence of Moscow, 1304–1359. Univ of California Press. ISBN 978-0-520-34759-5.
- Tikhomirov, Mikhail N. (1947). Древняя Москва (XII-XV вв.) (in Russian). Московский ордена Ленина Гос. унив. им. М.В. Ломоносова.

Regnal titles
Preceded by Sviatoslav	Grand Prince of Vladimir; 1248	Succeeded by Andrey
