= Vasily of Suzdal =

Prince of Suzdal from 1305 to 1309

Vasily
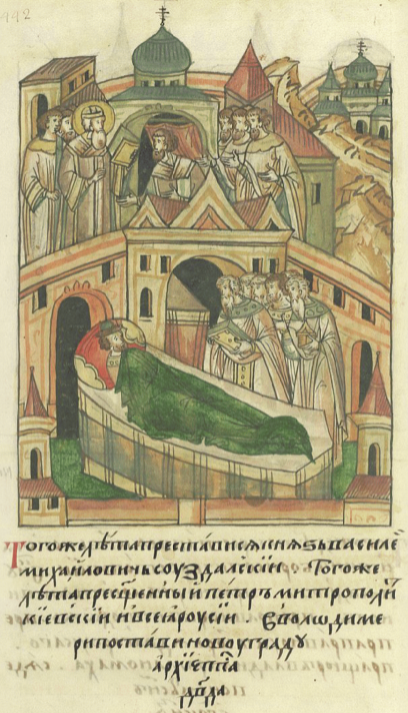
- The death of Vasily, miniature from the Illustrated Chronicle of Ivan the Terrible (16th century)

Prince of Suzdal
- Reign: 1305–1309
- Predecessor: Mikhail
- Successor: Aleksandr
- Died: 1309
- Issue: Aleksandr of Suzdal; Konstantin of Suzdal
- House: Rurik
- Father: Andrey II of Vladimir (or Mikhail of Suzdal)

Vasily (Russian: Василий; died 1309) was Prince of Suzdal from 1305 to 1309. He was the father of Aleksandr of Suzdal (r. 1309–1331).

== Life ==
Practically nothing is known about Vasily. He is mentioned in the Nikon Chronicle in connection with his death, where he is given the patronymic "Mikhailovich". The historian Vladimir Kuchkin says "this only mention of Prince Vasily Mikhailovich in Russian chronicle collections is very difficult to interpret".

His father may have been Mikhail Andreyevich, the son of Andrey Yaroslavich and the prince of Suzdal until 1305. However, this contradicts an earlier genealogical source and later genealogical books, where Vasily is mentioned as a son of Andrey. Therefore, it is possible that the compiler of the Nikon Chronicle made an error.

== Family ==
Vasily may have been born c. 1275–1280 and his son Aleksandr was most likely born in the late 1290s. He had another son, Konstantin.

== See also ==
- Family tree of Russian monarchs

== Bibliography ==
- Feldbrugge, Ferdinand J. M. (2 October 2017). A History of Russian Law: From Ancient Times to the Council Code (Ulozhenie) of Tsar Aleksei Mikhailovich of 1649. BRILL. ISBN 978-90-04-35214-8.
- Fennell, John (2023) [1968]. The Emergence of Moscow, 1304–1359. University of California Press. ISBN 978-0-520-34759-5.
- Pudalov, B. M. (2004). Русские земли Среднего Поволжья (вторая треть XIII – первая треть XIV в.) [Russian lands of the Middle Volga region (second third of the 13th to first third of the 14th centuries)] (in Russian). Nizhny Novgorod: Комитет по делам архивов Нижегородской области. ISBN 5-93413-023-4.
