= Yury of Suzdal =

Prince of Suzdal from 1264 to 1279

Yury Andreyevich
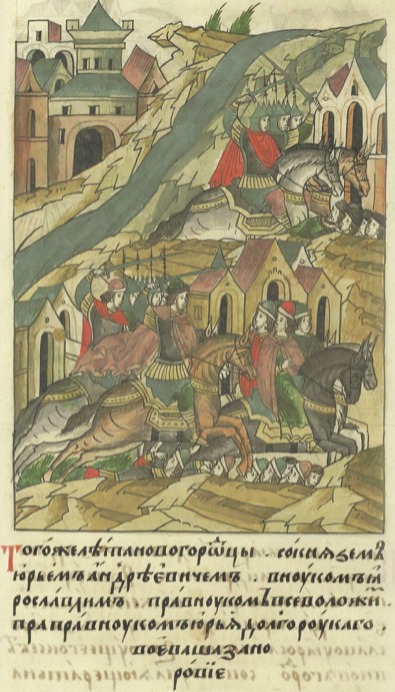
- Miniature from the Illustrated Chronicle of Ivan the Terrible (16th century)

Prince of Suzdal
- Reign: 1264–1279
- Predecessor: Andrey
- Successor: Mikhail
- Died: 8 March 1279
- House: Rurik
- Father: Andrey II of Vladimir

Yury Andreyevich (Russian: Юрий Андреевич; died 8 March 1279) was Prince of Suzdal from 1264 to 1279. He was the eldest son of Andrey Yaroslavich.

== Reign ==
Yury was born around 1250. He was the eldest of the three sons of Andrey Yaroslavich. After his father's death in 1264, he received Suzdal as an appanage; however, the appanage was reduced in size as Gorodets had been given to Andrey Aleksandrovich.

He spent most of his live in Novgorod as a namestnik (viceroy). He is mentioned in 1267 as leading the Novgorodian army in what was initially supposed to be a campaign against the Grand Duchy of Lithuania. As they approached the Pskov region, they instead moved towards Wesenberg and fought against the Teutonic Knights, but failed to take the city. The following year, Yury led the army in pushing the Germans out of the Pskov region.

He died on 8 March 1279 and was buried in the Cathedral of the Nativity of the Theotokos in Suzdal. He left no children.

== Bibliography ==
- Boguslavsky, Vladimir V.; Kuksina, Elena I. (2001). "Юрий Андреевич". Славянская энциклопедия. Киевская Русь — Московия. Т. 2: Н—Я (in Russian). Moskva: ОЛМА Медиа Групп. p. 714. ISBN 978-5-224-02251-9.
- Feldbrugge, Ferdinand J. M. (2 October 2017). A History of Russian Law: From Ancient Times to the Council Code (Ulozhenie) of Tsar Aleksei Mikhailovich of 1649. BRILL. ISBN 978-90-04-35214-8.
- Fennell, John (2023) [1968]. The Emergence of Moscow, 1304–1359. University of California Press. ISBN 978-0-520-34759-5.
