= Battle of Wesenberg (1268) =

Part of the Northern Crusades

- Part of the Northern Crusades
- Map showing the location of the battle in the context of 13th-century Livonia
Date	18 February 1268
Location	near Rakvere, Estonia 59°21′N 26°21′E
Result	Inconclusive

Belligerents
Novgorod Republic; Pskov Republic; Grand Principality of Vladimir	Duchy of Estonia; Bishopric of Dorpat; Livonian Order

Commanders and leaders
Dmitry of Pereslavl; Daumantas of Pskov; Yury of Suzdal; Mikhail Fyodorovich †	Alexander of Dorpat †; Otto von Lutterberg

Strength
c. 10,000–20,000	c. 20,000

Casualties and losses
Unknown	Unknown

The Battle of Wesenberg, Rakvere, or Rakovor, (Note: German: Schlacht bei Wesenberg; Russian: Раковорская битва, romanized: Rakovorskaya bitva.) was fought on 18 February 1268 between the combined forces of Danish Estonia, the Bishopric of Dorpat, the Livonian Order, and local Estonian militias on one side, and the combined Russian forces of Novgorod and Pskov, led by Dmitry of Pereslavl, on the other. Medieval accounts of the battle vary, with both sides claiming victory.

== Background ==
The Livonian Order and the Bishopric of Dorpat had made an agreement with Novgorod prior to the battle, in which they promised not to interfere in the Russians' warfare against Danish Estonia. In 1267, Novgorodian forces launched a campaign to Vironia. Yury of Suzdal is mentioned in Russian chronicles as leading the army in what was initially supposed to be a campaign against the Grand Duchy of Lithuania. As they approached the Pskov region, they instead moved towards Wesenberg, but failed to capture the castle:

The men of Novgorod consulted with their Prince Iurii, they wished to go against the Lithuanians, while others [wished to go] against Polotsk and others beyond the Narva River. And when they reached the village of Dubrovna there was a quarrel; and they went back and went beyond the Narva River to Wesenberg and made great havoc in their land, but did not take the castle.

— Novgorod First Chronicle

The Novgorodians planned a new offensive at the initiative of the posadnik (mayor) of Novgorod, Mikhail Fyodorovich. In 1268, the joint forces of several Russian princes, including those led by Dmitry of Pereslavl and Daumantas of Pskov, went on a raid in northern Estonia and clashed with the joint forces of the Livonian Order, the Bishopric of Dorpat, and the Danish king. Otto von Lutterberg, the Landmeister of Livonia, declared that his troops "by divine providence devastated Pskov, which was help and refuge of the betrayers of the Christian religion".

== Account of the Livonian Rhymed Chronicle ==
According to the Livonian Rhymed Chronicle, the only contemporary primary source describing the battle whose text survives in unaltered form to the present day, the combined forces of the two Russian republics invaded the territory of Danish Estonia in January 1268 where they commenced with looting of the countryside. The Danish vassals requested reinforcements from the neighboring territories ruled by the Livonian Order and the Bishopric of Dorpat, which they received in the form of 34 Brothers from castles Weissenstein, Leal and Fellin plus an unknown number of lesser troops, and from the Bishopric an unknown number of men under the leadership of Bishop Alexander of Dorpat. The contingent of the Livonian Knights was most likely led by a castellan of one of the aforementioned castles, as the Master of the Order, Otto von Lutterberg, was campaigning in the south, in Semgallia (Otto was in Riga on January 16).

When all the forces were assembled the native Estonian troops were positioned on the left flank, which they were told to hold during the battle, while the larger group, the Danish "king's men", were stationed on the right. The Brothers and their men are mentioned as having fought on all fronts. The death of Bishop Alexander is listed early in the description of the battle. Two formations of Russians advanced upon them but were beaten back and forced to retreat across a broad field, the retreat turning into a rout and a pursuit. Then, Prince Dmitry Aleksandrovich, who is complimented by the chronicler as being brave, managed to regroup about 5,000 men for a counterattack, while the rest of his army had fled. The Brothers' forces met Dmitry's attack along a deep river. At that point, the Brothers are mentioned as having 180 men plus 80 foot-soldiers. The footsoldiers led an attack upon a bridge. Then, the Brothers joined the attack, and the battle was over with 5,000 Russians dead, the rest defeated and routed.

== Account of the Chronicle of Novgorod ==
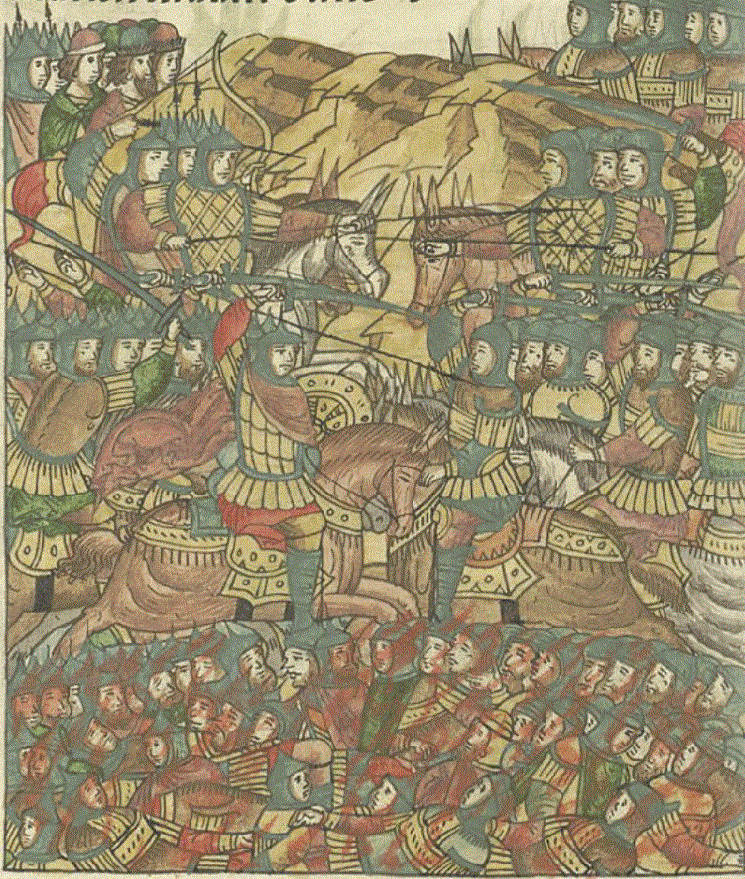
The depiction of the battle in the Illustrated Chronicle of Ivan the Terrible (16th century)

The Chronicle of Novgorod is the main Russian source describing the battle. However, the chronicle was rewritten on multiple occasions, most notably in the 15th century, and edited according to the political ideology of the era. The Novgorod First Chronicle mentions the battle under the year 6776 (1268) in the Byzantine calendar. The Pskov Second Chronicle also mentions it under the same year.

According to the Chronicle of Novgorod, on 23 January 1268, the joint Russian army left for Wesenberg. The united Russian forces crossed the Narva River and moved towards Wesenberg but did not take the town. They looted the countryside and found a huge cave filled with the Chuds (Estonians). Unable to attack the hiding Estonians for three days, the Russians finally devised a way to channel some water into the cave which forced the Estonians to flee, causing many of them to be slain. Then, the Russians advanced on Wesenberg and met the German force at the river Kegola ("there was a terrible battle such as neither fathers nor grandfathers had seen"). The Russian forces without delay crossed the river and organized their battle lines by placing the men from Pskov on the right, Dmitry's force on the right higher up, and the remainder of the Novgorodian forces forming up in the center and on the right. The German "iron troops" are described as advancing in a great wedge. Then, the Chronicle lists a long string of names of boyars (nobles) who were slain in the battle, while Prince Yury fled ("and Prince Iurii turned shoulder, or there was treachery in him, God knows"). However, the Germans were pushed back and pursued as far as the town.

The Chronicle says that on 18 February, Dmitry and his army defeated enemy forces, who fled to the castle. At that time, another German wedge attacked the Russian transport, but due to nightfall the Germans and the Russian main force did not engage each other. The two forces end up facing each other over a close distance but the Germans flee from the battlefield before the sun rises ("they [the Livonians], accursed transgressors of the Cross, fled, not waiting for the light").

== Aftermath ==
The result of the battle was inconclusive, with both sides having suffered heavy losses. Many Russian noblemen died, including Novgorod's posadnik (mayor) Mikhail Fyodorovich. A Livonian victory is sometimes seen as more plausible as Russian forces retreated from Danish Estonia and the Livonian Knights launched a retaliatory attack on Izborsk and Pskov soon afterward, in June 1269. According to Russian historiographic tradition, the Russian army won the battle, although it is considered to be of secondary importance compared to other battles. Sources describing it as a Russian victory note that Russian forces reached the Baltic coast and returned with a considerable amount of loot.

On 30 May 1268, a trade embargo was imposed after Konrad von Mandern issued a charter confirming that the Teutonic Order, in agreement with the burghers of Lübeck and all the other merchants, had stopped business with "opponents of the faith, that is, with Russians from Novgorod". The battle was followed by an unsuccessful siege of Pskov by the Livonian Order. After a long period of negotiations, the Livonians were able to make peace with Novgorod in 1269, and in the following two decades, Novgorod managed to increase its domination over Votia; however, Catholic writers did not see the region as belonging to the Russians. The Livonians and Denmark's Archbishopric of Lund agreed that the conquered Russian lands were to be united with the Bishopric of Dorpat. However, due to war with the Lithuanians, the Livonians signed a peace treaty with Yaroslav of Novgorod in 1270, in which they gave up their claims to northwestern Russia. For the next 30 years, German aggression came to an end due to the Germans' struggle against the Lithuanians. However, by 1301, Pope Boniface VIII lifted the interdict imposed on the north of Danish Estonia, since it was surrounded "by Russians, Karelians, Izhorians, Votians and Lithuanians", who encouraged apostasy among Estonian converts.

== Sources ==
- Boguslavsky, Vladimir V.; Kuksina, Elena I. (2001). "Юрий Андреевич". Славянская энциклопедия. Киевская Русь — Московия. Т. 2: Н—Я (in Russian). Moskva: ОЛМА Медиа Групп. p. 714. ISBN 978-5-224-02251-9.
- Selart, Anti (5 July 2017). "Confessional Conflict and Political Co-operation: Livonia and Russia in the Thirteenth Century". In Murray, Alan V. (ed.). Crusade and Conversion on the Baltic Frontier 1150–1500. Taylor & Francis. pp. 151–176. ISBN 978-1-351-94715-2.
- Selart, Anti (31 March 2015). Livonia, Rus' and the Baltic Crusades in the Thirteenth Century. BRILL. ISBN 978-90-04-28475-3.
- Nazarova, Evgeniya L. (2006a). "Russia (Rus')". In Alan V., Alan V. (ed.). The Crusades: An Encyclopedia [4 Volumes]. Bloomsbury Academic. pp. 1052–1055. ISBN 978-1-57607-862-4.
- Nazarova, Evgeniya L. (2006b). "Wesenberg, Battle of (1268)". In Murray, Alan V. (ed.). The Crusades: An Encyclopedia [4 Volumes]. Bloomsbury Academic. p. 1269. ISBN 978-1-57607-862-4.
- Nicolle, David; Shpakovsky, Viacheslav (2002). Medieval Russian Armies 1250–1500. Bloomsbury USA. p. 7. ISBN 978-1-84176-234-0.
- Wieczynski, Joseph L., ed. (1982). "Rakovor, Battle of". The Modern Encyclopedia of Russian and Soviet History. Vol. 30. Academic International Press. p. 176. ISBN 978-0-87569-064-3.
