= Tver Uprising of 1327 =

Popular uprising against the Golden Horde

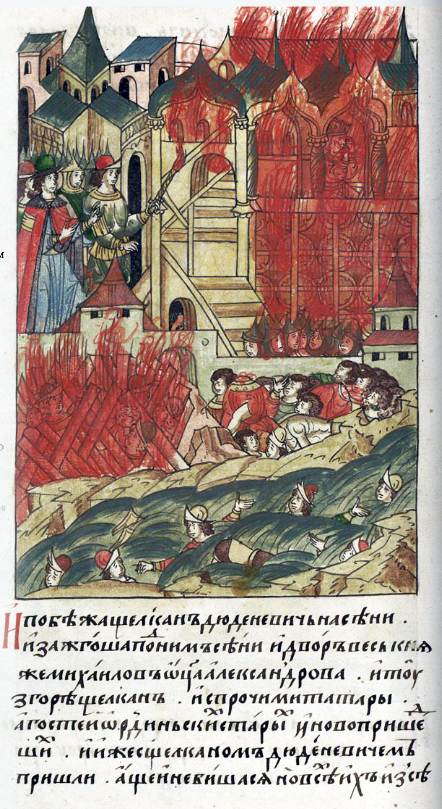
- Miniature depicting the uprising from the Illustrated Chronicle of Ivan the Terrible
Date	1327
Location	Principality of Tver
Result	Golden Horde victory

Belligerents
Principality of Tver	Golden Horde; Principality of Moscow; Principality of Suzdal Supported by: Golden Horde

Commanders and leaders
Aleksandr of Tver (executed); Fyodor (executed)	Fedorchuk; Turalyk; Ivan I of Moscow; Aleksandr of Suzdal Supported by: Özbeg Khan; Chol-khan †

Strength
	At least 50,000 Mongol soldiers in addition to the armies of Moscow and Suzdal

The Tver Uprising of 1327 (Russian: Тверское восстание) was a popular uprising against the Golden Horde by the people of the Principality of Tver. Their prince, Aleksandr, eventually fled to Pskov. The Tatars dispatched a punitive force led by Ivan I of Moscow and Aleksandr of Suzdal to crush the uprising. The following year, Özbeg Khan divided the Vladimir grand principality between Ivan I of Moscow and Aleksandr of Suzdal.

== Background ==
In the early 13th century, the Mongol Empire invaded the Kievan Rus' and proceeded to establish a hegemony over the Russian states. Among the most important of these was the Vladimir grand principality, the most powerful Russian principality at the time. The extent of Mongol power was so great that the Golden Horde had the power to issue a jarlig, or decree, that allowed the Russian princes to rule over their lands, only if they swore allegiance to the Mongol Empire. When confidence fell for the rule of the grand princes of Vladimir, various factions in the grand principality began to jostle for power, and the region divided itself into several principalities, including Tver, Moscow, and others. All these states acknowledged the rule of the prince of Vladimir, but the power had become notional at best by the dawn of the fourteenth century.

In the autumn of 1326, Aleksandr, the prince of Tver, received the jarlig from Özbeg Khan, authorizing the prince to rule Vladimir. About a year later, Özbeg's cousin, Chol-khan, arrived in Tver with a large retinue and removed Aleksandr from the prince's palace in an apparent reversal of the grant. Instead, Chol-khan took residence in Aleksandr's former home and began a campaign of persecution against the Christians of Tver in which numerous atrocities were committed, including rape, robbery and beatings. A rumor arose among the people of a Mongol plan to kill all the princes of the principality of Vladimir on the day of the feast of the Dormition of the Mother of God, make Chol-khan the new ruler of Tver and force the people to convert to Islam, although the verity of the rumor is disputed. The people of Tver turned to Aleksandr to address the issue, but he urged them to "endure."

== Events ==
Despite Aleksandr's advice, conflict broke out on August 15, 1327, when Chol-khan's men attempted to confiscate a mare from a local deacon named Dudko and the people gathered to protect him. Hastily assembled a town assembly, Tver people resolved to rise again the Mongols. They assaulted Mongol forces throughout the city. Chol-khan attempted to protect himself inside the palace from the insurgents, but when the building was lit on fire, he perished. Tartars throughout Tver were slaughtered, including the "Bessermen," Tartar merchants. Some chronicles and modern historians believe that Aleksandr instigated the uprising, but this is unlikely considering the consequences that such a violent rebellion would have. However, he did not take any measures to suppress the insurrection.

The prince of Moscow, Ivan Kalita, a long time rival of the princes of Tver, hastened to take advantage of the uprising in order to assert his supremacy. Upon hearing the news of the massacres of Tatars, Ivan set off to the khan with the expectation that he would be given the patent for the grand princely title. Instead, he was given a Tatar army and ordered to lead a punitive force, along with Alexander of Suzdal, to sack Tver. Ivan received 50,000 Mongol warriors under the command of five Mongol generals. The prince of Suzdal also joined the Russo-Mongol punitive expedition that came to be known as the "Army of Fedorchuk," named after the Tatar commander Fedorchuk.

In retaliation, the Russo-Mongol army took dozens of captives and burned entire villages to the ground. Aleksandr fled to Novgorod, who turned him away, and then to Pskov, where he was made the prince, to escape capture by Ivan. Novgorod managed to avoid the wrath of the army for involving themselves with the prince by paying the Mongol horde two thousand silver hryvnias and providing them with many gifts. Meanwhile, Ivan and his allies demanded the extradition of Aleksandr from Pskov, and Metropolitan Theognostus of Kiev excommunicated the prince and all the people of Pskov from the church. In order to alleviate the threat of invasion from his host city, Aleksandr fled once again to Lithuania in 1329, where he would remain for over a year.

== Aftermath ==
The uprising greatly reduced the Tver principality's power in northeastern Russia. In 1328, Özbeg divided the grand principality between Aleksandr of Suzdal and Ivan I of Moscow. Due to his failure to deliver Alexander of Tver to the khan, Ivan was not made the sole grand prince. Aleksandr of Suzdal ruled the eastern portion, including Vladimir, and was presumably granted the grand princely title, while Ivan controlled Novgorod and Kostroma. By granting the more prestigious Vladimir to the weaker of the two princes, Özbeg maintained adherence to the principle of "divide and rule," reasoning that Moscow's jealousy of Suzdal's lands would prevent them from allying to fight against the Golden Horde.

Aleksandr of Tver later returned to Pskov in 1331 or 1332 with the end goal of recovering his principality as well as possibly the grand principality. In 1334 or early 1335, he sent his son to the Horde. By 1336, Aleksander was convinced that it would be safe for him to make a trip to the Horde to be reinstated as prince. During his visit to the Horde, Aleksandr was granted a full pardon and the right to return to Tver. He returned to Tver in the autumn of 1338, in which the chronicles simply state that he was given permission to resume his activities as prince. The following year, Özbeg sent an ambassador to Tver requesting him to return to the Horde. Aleksandr and his son arrived at Sarai and were executed the following month on the order of Özbeg.

Following the execution of Aleksandr Vasilyevich, Ivan received the Vladimir grand principality and became the leading prince in northeastern Russia. Favor from the khan of the Golden Horde allowed Moscow to gain power rapidly at the expense of Tver, with Tver eventually losing all influence to Moscow. However, a new rivalry was formed between the princes of Nizhny Novgorod-Suzdal. The relative power of Moscow and their strong alliance with the Horde led to a period of relative peace in Russia that was not interrupted until the reign of Dmitry Donskoy, the first prince of Moscow to openly challenge the Horde. He would later defeat them at the Battle of Kulikovo in 1380.

== Sources ==
- Fennell, John (2023). The Emergence of Moscow, 1304–1359. University of California Press. ISBN 978-0-520-34759-5.
