= Vasily of Kostroma =

Grand Prince of Vladimir from 1272 to 1276

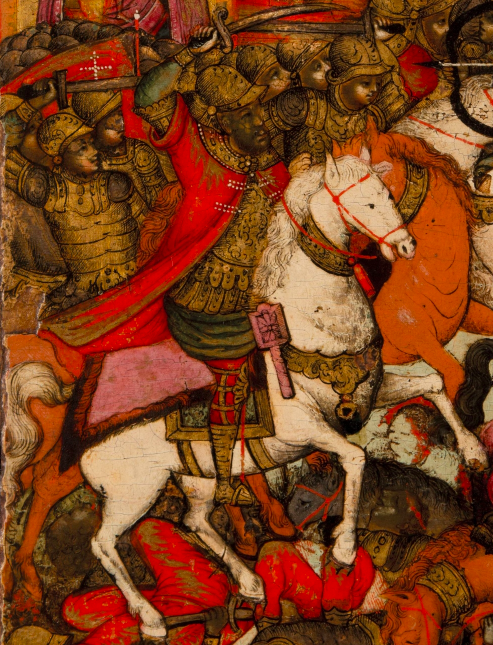
Image of Vasily from an icon from the 1680s

Vasily Yaroslavich (Russian: Василий Ярославич; 1241 – January 1276) was Grand Prince of Vladimir from 1272 to 1276. He was the youngest son of Yaroslav II.

Vasily was given Kostroma by his uncle Sviatoslav III in 1246. As the eldest surviving grandson of Vsevolod III, he succeeded to the throne of Vladimir in 1272, and to Novgorod the following year. He was one of the first princes who did not leave their own city (i.e. Kostroma) and settle in Vladimir. His descendants continued to rule Kostroma for half a century after his death in January 1276.

== See also ==
- Family tree of Russian monarchs

== Sources ==
- "Василий Ярославич, князь костромской" . Brockhaus and Efron Encyclopedic Dictionary (in Russian). 1906.

Vasily of Kostroma Rurik Born: 1241 Died: January 1276
Regnal titles
Preceded by Yaroslav of Tver	Grand Prince of Vladimir; 1272–1276	Succeeded by Dmitry of Pereslavl
