= Aleksandr of Suzdal =

Prince of Suzdal from 1309 to 1331

Aleksandr Vasilyevich
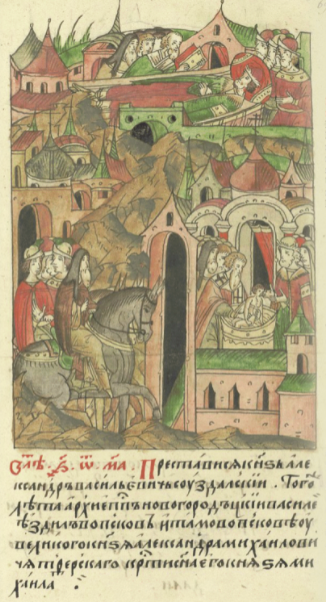
- The death of Aleksandr, miniature from the Illustrated Chronicle of Ivan the Terrible (16th century)

Prince of Suzdal
- Reign: 1309–1331
- Predecessor: Vasily
- Successor: Konstantin

Grand Prince of Vladimir
- Reign: 1328–1331
- Predecessor: Aleksandr I of Tver
- Successor: Ivan I of Moscow
- Died: 1331
- House: Rurik
- Father: Vasily of Suzdal

Aleksandr Vasilyevich (Russian: Александр Васильевич; died 1331) was Prince of Suzdal from 1309 and Grand Prince of Vladimir from 1328 until his death in 1331.

== Life ==
Aleksandr was the eldest son of Vasily of Suzdal, the sixth prince on the throne of Suzdal. Aleksandr inherited the throne after his father died in 1309.

Aleksandr is first mentioned in 1327 when he joined Ivan I of Moscow in a punitive expedition against Tver that was ordered by Özbeg Khan following a popular uprising against the Tatars. Tver was sacked and its prince, Aleksandr, had fled. For his role in the expedition, Özbeg rewarded Aleksandr with the title of grand prince in 1328. The grand principality was shared between Aleksandr and Ivan, with Vladimir and the Volga district going to Aleksandr and Novgorod and Kostroma going to Ivan. According to John I. L. Fennell, "Suzdal' seemed a suitable replacement for the house of Tver' as a counterbalance to the principality of Moscow" in the eyes of Özbeg. Aleksandr again joined the Russian princes led by Ivan in a campaign against Aleksandr in 1329, after he was granted sanctuary in Pskov.

As grand prince, Aleksandr preferred to remain in Suzdal, the center of his appanage, which is evident from the semi-legendary account of him transferring the veche bell from the Dormition Cathedral in Vladimir to Suzdal, his only independent act as grand prince:

This Prince Alexander from Vladimir took the veche bell from the Church of the Holy Mother of God to Suzdal and the bell ceased to ring as in Vladimir. And Prince Alexander thought he had been rude to the Holy Mother of God, and he ordered it taken back to Vladimir. And when the bell was brought back and installed in its place, its peal once again became acceptable to God.

— Novgorod First Chronicle

Lev Cherepnin says that "this was apparently done on the orders of the Tatar khan, who aimed to suppress the veche systems in Russian cities", while Yury Krivosheyev concludes that the bell "was meant to serve not so much the interests of the prince but the interests of the community (including princely interests)". Boris Pudalov says that these interpretations are unsupported by the sources; instead, he says that "a likely motivation for the Suzdal prince's actions was the desire to adorn and elevate his princely 'capital' and assert his authority over Vladimir, which was losing its former greatness as the capital of the grand principality".

After his death in 1331, (Note: Although the year 1332 is also given in sources, 1331 is likely correct as the article which mentions the yarlyk being shared says that Aleksandr ruled for two-and-a-half years, while Ivan went to the Horde at the end of 1331 and could not have gone in 1332.) his younger brother Konstantin inherited the principality of Suzdal, while Ivan became the sole grand prince after receiving the yarlyk (patent) from Özbeg.

== See also ==
- Family tree of Russian monarchs

== Bibliography ==
- Fennell, John (15 November 2023). The Emergence of Moscow, 1304–1359. Univ of California Press. ISBN 978-0-520-34759-5.
- Pudalov, B. M. (2004). Русские земли Среднего Поволжья (вторая треть XIII – первая треть XIV в.) [Russian lands of the Middle Volga region (second third of the 13th to first third of the 14th centuries)] (in Russian). Nizhny Novgorod: Комитет по делам архивов Нижегородской области. ISBN 5-93413-023-4.
- Tikhomirov, Mikhail N. (1959). The Towns of Ancient Rus. Foreign Languages Publishing House.
