= Family tree of Russian monarchs =

The following is a family tree of the monarchs of Russia.

== Rurik dynasty ==
Rurik dynasty (Rurikids)
Legend:

- Grand Princes of Kiev
- Grand Princes of Vladimir
- Princes of Novgorod
- Grand Princes of Moscow
- Tsars of (All) Russia

Rurik c. 830–879; Prince of Novgorod r. 862–879
Igor I d. 945; Prince of Kiev r. 914–945	Olga c. 890–969; Regent of Kiev; 945–960s
Predslava	Sviatoslav I c. 942–972; Prince of Kiev r. 945–972	Malusha
Yaropolk I c. 959–980; Prince of Kiev r. 972–980	Oleg d. 977; Prince of Drevlians	Vladimir I the Great c. 958–1015; Grand Prince of Kiev r. 980–1015
Sviatopolk I the Accursed c. 979–1019; Grand Prince of Kiev r. 1015–1019	Izyaslav; 978–1001; Prince of Polotsk	Mstislav d. 1035; Prince of Chernigov	Yaroslav I the Wise c. 978–1054; Grand Prince of Kiev r. 1019–1054	Boris; 986–1015; Prince of Rostov	Gleb; 987–1015; Prince of Murom	Sudislav d. 1063; Prince of Pskov	Maria Dobroniega of Kiev aft.1012–1087	Vysheslav c. 977–1010; Prince of Novgorod r. 988–1010
Iziaslav I 1024–1078; Grand Prince of Kiev r. 1054–1068, r. 1069–1073, r. 1076–1078	Sviatoslav II; 1027–1076; Grand Prince of Kiev r. 1073–1076	Vladimir; 1020–1052; Prince of Novgorod r. 1036–1052	Igor d. 1060; Prince of Smolensk	Vsevolod I Yaroslavich; 1030–1093; Grand Prince of Kiev r. 1078–1093	Vyacheslav d. 1059; Prince of Smolensk
Sviatopolk II; 1050–1113; Grand Prince of Kiev r. 1093–1113	Oleg I of Chernigov c. 1052 – c. 1115	Davyd d. 1123; Prince of Chernigov	Gleb; Prince of Tmutarakan and Novgorod c. 1052 – c. 1078	Roman the Handsome; Pr. of Tmutarakan c. 1052 – c. 1079	Vladimir II; Monomakh; 1053–1125; Grand Prince of Kiev r. 1113–1125	Rostislav; 1070–1093; Prince of Pereyaslavl	Eupraxia of Kiev c. 1067/1070 – c. 1109
Vsevolod II; Olgovich d. 1146; Grand Prince of Kiev r. 1139–1146	Igor II; Olgovich d. 1147; Grand Prince of Kiev r. 1146	Iziaslav III d. 1162; Grand Prince of Kiev r. 1154–1155, r. 1157–1158, 1162	Roman d. 1119; Prince of Volhynia	Andrey the Kind; 1102–1141; Prince of Volhynia	Svyatoslav c. 1080 – c. 1114; Prince of Smolensk and Pereyaslav	Euphemia of Kiev fl. 1112–1139
Sviatoslav III d. 1194; Grand Prince of Kiev r. 1177–1180, 1174, r. 1182–1194	Mstislav I 1076–1132; Grand Prince of Kiev r. 1125–1132	Yaropolk II; 1082–1139; Grand Prince of Kiev r. 1132–1139	Viacheslav; 1083–1154; Grand Prince of Kiev r. 1139–1151, 1154	Yuri I Dolgorukiy c. 1099–1157; Grand Prince of Kiev r. 1149–1151, r. 1155–1157
Vsevolod IV d. 1212; Grand Prince of Kiev r. 1203, 1206, 1207, r. 1208–1212	Iziaslav II c. 1096–1154; Grand Prince of Kiev r. 1146–1149, r. 1151–1154	Vladimir III; 1132–1173; Grand Prince of Kiev r. 1171	Rostislav I c. 1110–1167; Grand Prince of Kiev r. 1154, 1159–1167	Gleb d. 1171; Grand Prince of Kiev r. 1169, 1170–1171	Andrey I Bogolyubsky c. 1111–1174; Grand Prince of Vladimir r. 1157–1174	Mikhail of Vladimir d. 1176; Grand Prince of Vladimir; 1174, 1175–1176; Grand Prince of Kiev r. 1171	Vsevolod III the Big Nest; 1154–1173; Grand Prince of Vladimir r. 1177–1212; Grand Prince of Kiev r. 1173
Michael of Chernigov c. 1185–1246; Grand Prince of Kiev r. 1236–1240, 1240, r. 1241–1243	Mstislav II d. 1172; Grand Prince of Kiev r. 1167–1169, 1170	Yaroslav II d. 1180; Grand Prince of Kiev r. 1174–1175, 1180	Roman I d. 1180; Grand Prince of Kiev r. 1171–1173, r. 1175–1177	Rurik Rostislavich d. 1210; Grand Prince of Kiev r. 1173, 1180–1181, r. 1194–1201, 1205, r. 1206, 1207–1210	Konstantin; 1186–1218; Grand Prince of Vladimir r. 1216–1218	Yuri II; 1189–1238; Grand Prince of Vladimir r. 1212–1216, r. 1218–1238	Yaroslav II; 1191–1246; Grand Prince of Vladimir r. 1238–1246	Sviatoslav III; 1196–1252; Grand Prince of Vladimir r. 1246–1248
Rostislav Mikhailovich aft. 1210–1262; Duke of Macsó	Roman the Great c. 1152–1205; Grand Prince of Kiev; 1201/ 1204	Ingvar c. 1152–1220; Grand Prince of Kiev; 1202/ 1214	Mstislav III c. 1156–1223; Grand Prince of Kiev r. 1212–1223	Rostislav II c. 1173–1218; Grand Prince of Kiev r. 1204–1206	Vladimir IV; 1187–1239; Grand Prince of Kiev r. 1223–1235	Mikhail Khorobrit; 1229–1248; Grand Prince of Vladimir r. 1248	Vasily of Kostroma; 1241–1276; Grand Prince of Vladimir r. 1272–1276
Daniel of Galicia; 1201–1264; King of Ruthenia	Iziaslav IV; Vladimirovich; Grand Prince of Kiev r. 1235–1236	Alexander Nevsky; 1221–1263; Grand Prince of Kiev r. 1252–1263	Andrey II c. 1222–1264; Grand Prince of Vladimir r. 1249–1252	Yaroslav III; 1230–1271; Grand Prince of Vladimir r. 1264–1271
Dmitry of Pereslavl c. 1250–1294; Grand Prince of Vladimir r. 1276–1281, r. 1283–1293	Andrey III of Gorodets c. 1255–1304; Grand Prince of Vladimir r. 1293–1304	Daniel of Moscow; Grand Prince of Moscow; 1261–1303	Vasily; Prince of Suzdal d. 1309	Mikhail of Tver; 1271–1318; Grand Prince of Vladimir r. 1304–1318
Aleksandr d. 1308	Boris d. 1320; Prince of Kostroma r. 1304	Afanasy d. 1322; Prince of Novgorod r. 1314–1315, r. 1319–1322	Yury III of Moscow; 1281–1325; Grand Prince of Vladimir r. 1318–1322	Ivan I 1288–1340; Grand Prince of Moscow r. 1328–1340	Konstantin V d. 1355; Prince of Suzdal	Alexander of Suzdal d. 1331; Grand Prince of Vladimir r. 1328–1331
Daniel; 1320–1328	Andrei; 1327–1353; Prince of Serpukhov	Simeon the Proud; 1316–1353; Grand Prince of Moscow r. 1340–1353	Alexandra	Ivan II; 1326–1359; Grand Prince of Moscow r. 1353–1359	Dmitry of Suzdal; 1324–1383; Grand Prince of Vladimir r. 1359–1362	Dmitry of Tver; Fearsome Eyes; 1299–1326; Grand Prince of Vladimir r. 1322–1326	Alexander of Tver; 1301–1339; Grand Prince of Vladimir r. 1326–1327
Andrei Kobyla	Ivan; Prince of Zvenigorod c. 1356 – c. 1364	Dmitry Donskoy; 1350–1389; Grand Prince of Moscow r. 1359–1389	Eudoxia of Moscow d. 1407	Mikhail II of Tver; 1333–1375; Grand Prince of Vladimir r. 1371–1375
Simeon of Suzdal	Feodor Koshka d. 1407	Maria d. 1399	Anastasia	Simeon d. 1379	Ivan d. 1393	Andrey; 1382–1432; Prince of Mozhaysk	Pyotr; 1385–1428; Prince of Dmitrov	Anna; 1387–?	Vasiliy Kirdyapa c. 1350–1403; Prince of Suzdal
Vasily; Shuysky	Ivan; Fyodorovich; Koshkin d. 1427	Konstantin; 1389–1434; Prince of Uglich	Daniil c. 1370 – c. 1379	Sophia of Lithuania; 1371–1453	Vasily I 1371–1425; Grand Prince of Moscow r. 1389–1425	Yury of Zvenigorod; 1374–1434; Grand Prince of Moscow r. 1433–1434	Anastasia of Smolensk d. 1422	Yuri; Kirdyapin
Ivan; Shuysky	Zakhary; Ivanovich; Koshkin	Anna of Moscow; 1393–1417	Maria of Borovsk; 1418–1484	Vasily II; 1415–1462; Grand Prince of Moscow r. 1425–1433, r. 1435–1446, r. 1447–1462	Vasily Kosoy; 1421–1448; Grand Prince of Moscow r. 1434–1435	Dmitry Shemyaka d. 1453; Grand Prince of Moscow r. 1446–1447	Vasily Shuysky d. 1448?
Boris; Gorbaty-Shuysky	Yuri; Koshkin d. 1504	Maria of Tver; 1447–1467	Ivan III the Great; 1440–1505; Grand Prince of Moscow r. 1462–1505	Sophia Palaiologina c. 1440/1449 – c. 1503	Anna of Ryazan; 1451–1501	Andrey Bolshoy; 1446–1493	Mikhail; Shuysky
Alexander; Gorbaty-Shuysky	Roman Yurievich Zakharyin d. 1543	Ivan the Young; 1458–1490	Simeon; Prince of Kaluga; 1487–1518	Andrey of Staritsa; 1490–1537	Vasili III; 1479–1533; Grand Prince of Moscow r. 1505–1533	Helena of Moscow; 1476–1513	Yury Ivanovich; 1480–1536	Dmitri; 1481–1521; Prince of Uglich	Andrey; Shuysky d. 1543
Eudoxia; Gorbataya-Shuyskaya c. 1535 – c. 1581	Nikita Romanovich c. 1522 – c. 1586	Feodor Ivanovich Godunov d. c. 1569	Anastasia Romanovna; 1530–1560	Ivan IV the Terrible; 1530–1584; Grand Prince of Moscow and all Russia r. 1533–1547; Tsar of all Russia r. 1547–1584	Maria Nagaya d. c. 1608	Yuri of Uglich; 1532–1563	Ivan; Shuysky c. 1533 – c. 1573
Philaret; 1553–1633; Patriarch of Moscow	Boris Godunov c. 1551–1605; Tsar of Russia r. 1598–1605	Maria; Skuratova; Belskaya d. 1605	Irina Godunova; 1557–1603	Feodor I 1557–1598; Tsar of All Russia r. 1584–1598	Dmitry of Russia; 1552–1553	Ivan of Russia; 1554–1581	Dmitry of Uglich; 1582—1591 or 1582–1606	Vasili IV; Tsar of Russia; 1552–1612 r. 1606–1610
Michael I 1596–1645; Tsar of All Russia r. 1613–1645	Feodor II; 1589–1605; Tsar of Russia r. 1605	Xenia of Russia; 1582–1622
House of Romanov

== Romanov dynasty ==
Romanov dynasty

Maria Dolgorukova; 1601–1625	Mikhail I 1596–1645; Tsar of All Russia r. 1613–1645	Eudoxia Streshneva; 1608–1645
Irina Mikhailovna; 1627–1679	Pelagiya; 1628–1629	Anna; 1631–1676	Marfa; 1631–1632	Ivan; 1633–1639
Tatyana; 1636–1706	Sofiya; 1634–1636	Vasily; 1638/39?–1639	Yevdokiya; 1637?–1637	Maria Miloslavskaya; 1625–1669	Alexis; 1629–1676; Tsar of Russia r. 1645–1676	Natalya Naryshkina; 1651–1694
Dmitry; 1648–1649	Agafya Grushetskaya; 1663–1681	Feodor III; 1661–1682; Tsar of Russia r. 1676–1682	Marfa Apraksina; 1664–1716	Simeon; 1665–1669	Catherine; 1658–1718	Feodosia; 1662–1713	Maria; 1660–1723
Praskovia Saltykova; 1664–1723	Ivan V 1666–1696; Tsar of Russia r. 1682–1696	Marfa; 1652–1707	Alexei; 1654–1670	Sofia; 1657–1704; Regent of Russia r. 1682–1689	Yevdokia; 1650–1712
Maria; 1689–1692	Ivan Dmitriev-Mamonov; 1680–1730	Praskovya; 1694–1731	Feodosia; 1690–1691	Natalya; 1673–1716	Fyodora; 1674–1677	Eudoxia Lopukhina; 1669–1731	Peter I the Great; 1672–1725; Tsar/Emperor of Russia r. 1682–1725	Catherine I 1684–1727; Empress of Russia r. 1725–1727
Karl Leopold; 1678–1747; Duke of Mecklenburg-Schwerin	Catherine; 1691–1733	Frederick William; 1692–1711; Duke of Courland	Anna; 1693–1740; Empress of Russia r. 1730–1740	Charlotte Christine of Brunswick-Lüneburg; 1694–1715	Alexei; 1690–1718	Alexander; 1691–1692	Pavel; 1693
Anna Leopoldovna; 1718–1746; Regent of Russia r. 1740–1741	Anthony Ulrich of Brunswick; 1714–1774	Peter II; 1715–1730; Emperor of Russia r. 1727–1730	Peter; 1704	Paul; 1705	Catherine; 1706–1708	Elizabeth; 1709–1762; Empress of Russia r. 1741–1762
Ivan VI; 1740–1764; Emperor of Russia r. 1740–1741	Charles Frederick; 1700–1739; Duke of Holstein-Gottorp	Anna; 1708–1728	Maria; 1713–1715	Peter; 1715–1719	Pavel; 1717–1717	Natalia; 1718–1725
Peter III; 1728–1762; Emperor of Russia r. 1762	Catherine II the Great; 1729–1796; Empress of Russia r. 1762–1796
Natalia Alexeievna; 1755–1776	Paul I 1754–1801; Emperor of Russia r. 1796–1801	Maria Feodorovna; 1759–1828	Alexei Bobrinsky; 1762–1813	Anna; 1757–1759
Juliane; Princess of Saxe–Coburg-Saalfeld; 1781–1860	Konstantin Pavlovich; 1779–1831	Joanna Grudzińska; 1791–1831	Olga Pavlovna; 1792–1795	Alexandra Pavlovna; 1783–1801	Joseph; 1776–1847; Palatine of Hungary	Elena Pavlovna; 1784–1803	Frederick Louis; Grand Duke of Mecklenburg; 1778–1819
Elizabeth Alexeievna; 1779–1826	Alexander I 1777–1825; Emperor of Russia r. 1801–1825	Maria Pavlovna; 1786–1859	Charles Frederick of Saxe-Weimar-Eisenach; 1783–1853	Anna Pavlovna; 1795—1865	William II; 1792–1849; King of the Netherlands	Michael Pavlovich; 1798–1849	Charlotte; Princess of Württemberg; 1807–1873
Maria Alexandrovna; 1799–1800	Elizabeth Alexandrovna; 1806–1808	Nicholas I 1796–1855; Emperor of Russia r. 1825–1855	Alexandra Feodorovna; 1798–1860	William I 1781–1864; King of Württemberg	Catherine Pavlovna; 1788–1819	George; Duke of Oldenburg; 1784–1812
Frederic William of Hesse-Kassel; 1820–1884	Alexandra; 1825–1844	Konstantin Nikolayevich; 1827–1892	Alexandra of Saxe-Altenburg; 1830–1911	Olga; 1822–1892	Charles I 1823–1891; King of Württemberg	Maria; 1819–1876	Maximilian de Beauharnais; 1817–1852; Duke of Leuchtenberg	Peter; Duke of Oldenburg; 1812–1881
Olga of Baden; 1839–1891	Michael; 1832–1909	Maria; 1824–1880	Alexander II; 1818–1881; Emperor of Russia r. 1855–1881	Catherine Dolgorukova; 1847–1922	Nicholas; 1831–1891	Alexandra of Oldenburg; 1838–1900
Alexandra; 1842–1849	Nicholas Alexandrovich; 1843–1865	Maria Feodorovna; 1847–1928	Alexander III; 1845–1894; Emperor of Russia r. 1881–1894	Vladimir Alexandrovich; 1847–1909	Marie; Duchess of Mecklenburg-Schwerin; 1854–1920	Alexei; 1850–1908	Maria; 1853–1920	Alfred; 1844–1900; Duke of Saxe–Coburg and Gotha	Sergei; 1857–1905	Elisabeth of Hesse and by Rhine; 1864–1918	Paul; 1860–1919
Alexander; 1866–1933	Xenia; 1875–1960	Peter of Oldenburg; 1868–1924	Olga; 1882–1960	Nikolai Kulikovsky; 1881–1958	Nicholas II; 1868–1918; Emperor of Russia r. 1894–1917	Alexandra Feodorovna; 1872–1918	Alexander; 1869–1870	George; 1871–1899	Michael; 1878–1918	Natalia Brasova; 1880–1952
Olga; 1895–1918	Tatiana; 1897–1918	Maria; 1899–1918	Anastasia; 1901–1918	Alexei; 1904–1918

== Gallery ==
Rulers of Russia family trees

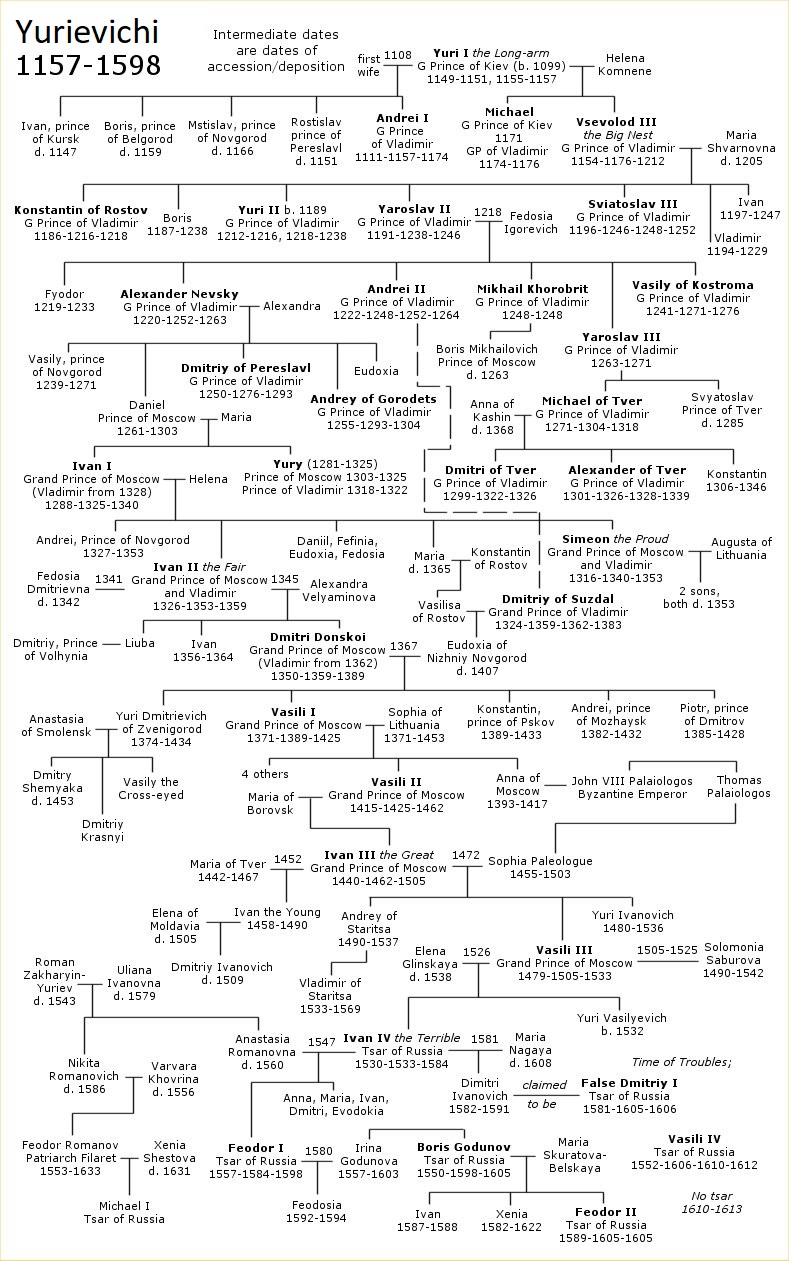

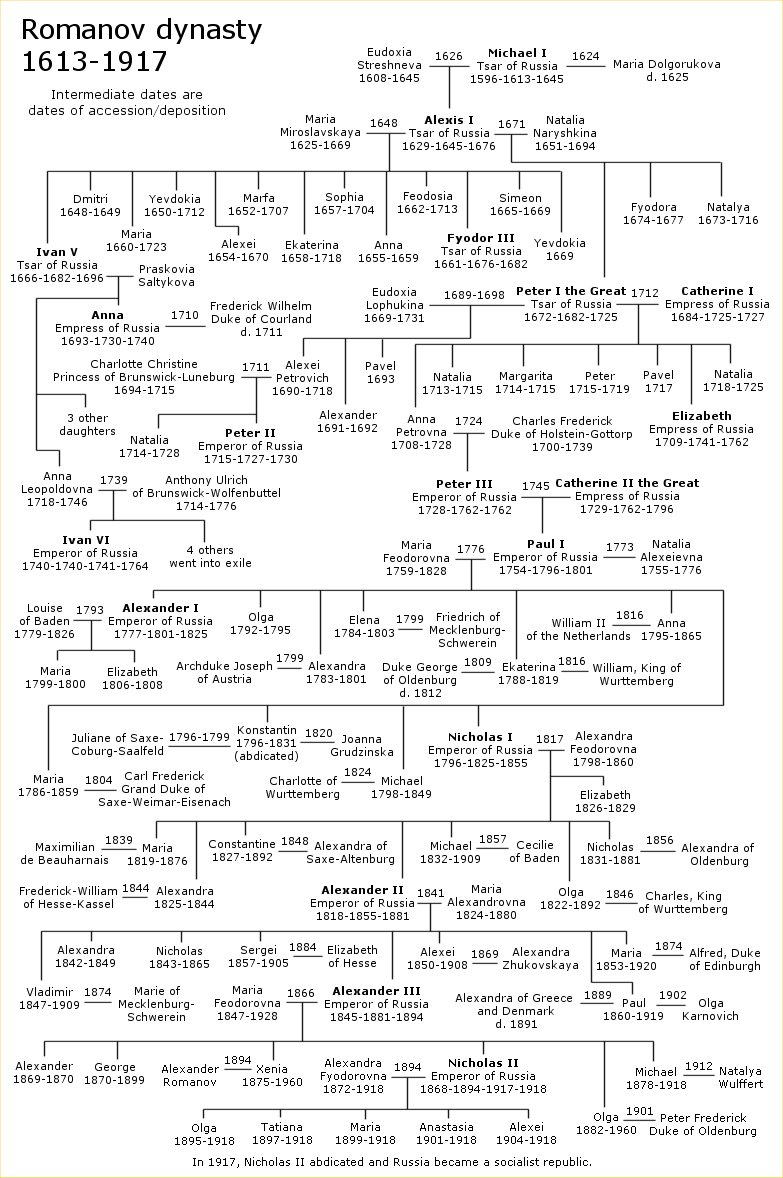

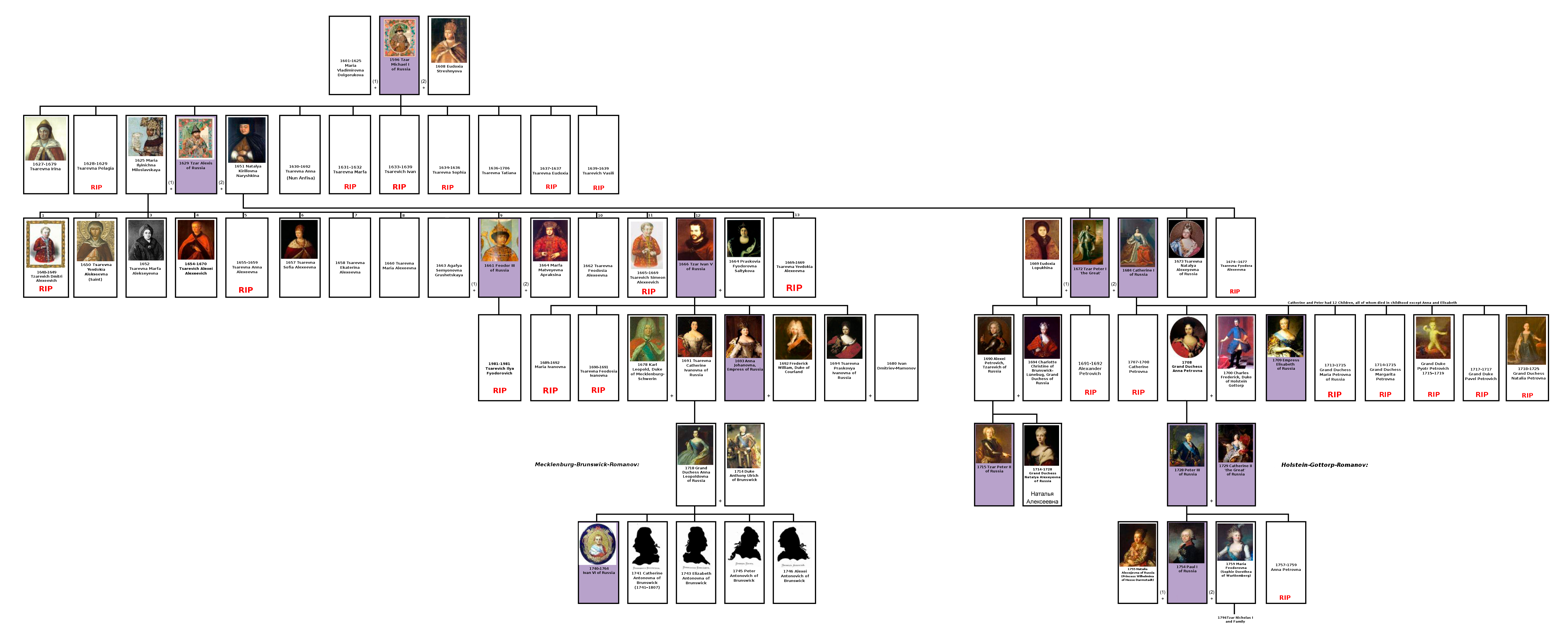

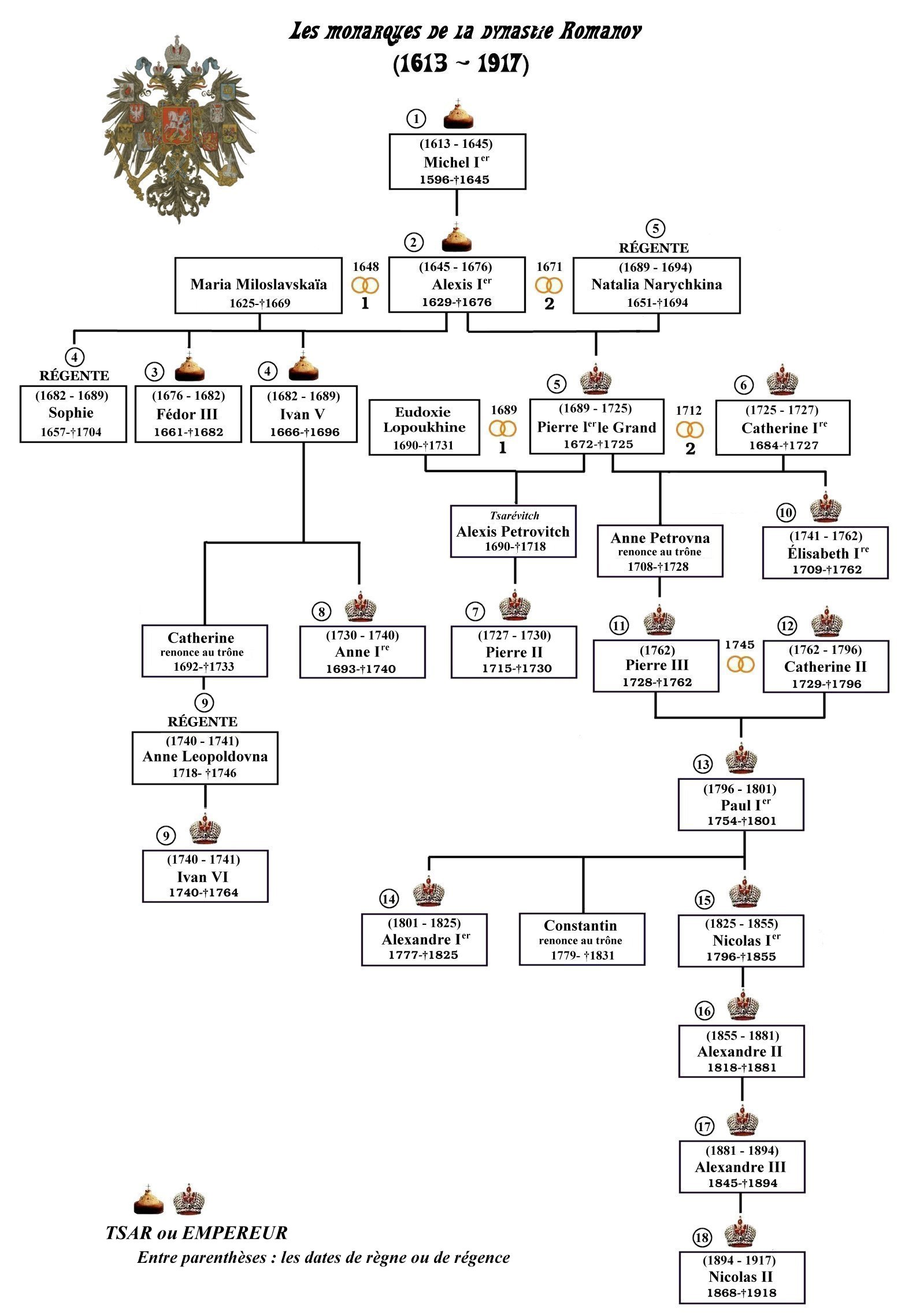

== Bibliography ==
- Войтович, Леонтій Вікторович (1992). Генеалогія Рюриковичів і Гедиміновичів. Avtor. ISBN 5-7702-0506-7.
- Коган, Владимир Михайлович (1993). История дома Рюриковичей. Издательский дом "Бельведер". ISBN 5-87461-001-4.
- Пчелов, Евгений Владимирович (2003). Монархи России. ОЛМА Медиа Групп. ISBN 5-224-04343-3.
