= Andrey II of Vladimir =

Grand Prince of Vladimir (1222–1264)

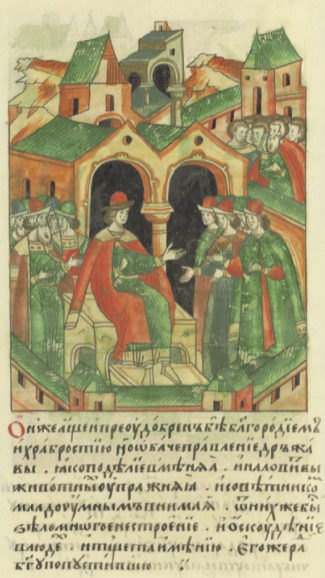
The earliest surviving image of Andrew from the Illustrated Chronicle of Ivan the Terrible (16th century)

Andrey II Yaroslavich (Russian: Андрей Ярославич; c. 1222 – 1264) was the third son of Yaroslav II who succeeded his uncle Sviatoslav III as Grand Prince of Vladimir in 1249. Three years later, he challenged the Mongols and was ousted by them.

The house of Nizhny Novgorod-Suzdal, which has been known since the 14th century as the House of Shuysky, descends from Andrey II.

== Life ==
=== Early 1240s campaigns ===
According to the Novgorod First Chronicle (NPL), the Novgorodians expelled his brother Alexander Nevsky from the city in the winter of 1240–1241, and asked their father Yaroslav II to send them another commander. Andrey was sent to the wayward republic in Alexander's stead. In 1241, Andrey joined his Suzdalian forces with Alexander's, and they jointly retook Pskov, raided the Estonian (Chud') countryside, and saw action in the Battle on the Ice.

=== Grand prince of Vladimir (c. 1248/9–1252) ===
Rus' chronicles preserve different versions of when and how Andrey became prince of Vladimir. In one version, when their father Yaroslav Vsevolodovich died in 1247, Andrey and Alexander went to Karakorum in Mongolia, where Andrey was appointed the next grand prince of Vladimir by jarlig of the great khan Güyük. On their return to Vladimir two years later (1249), they found that the capital had been seized by their young brother Mikhail Khorobrit. The latter, however, was killed in battle with the Lithuanians several months later. Another version of events has Andrey seize the throne of Vladimir from his uncle Sviatoslav Vsevolodovich (who initially laterally succeeded their father in 1247) in 1248. A year later, his uncle Sviatoslav, offended by his ousting from Vladimir, went to the Horde to secure the throne for himself; how his trip ended is unknown, but he died in February 1253 without retrieving Vladimir.

In the winter of 1250–1251, some time after taking the throne of Vladimir, Andrey married Ustynia, a daughter of Danylo of Halych, who had submitted to Batu Khan in 1245 and was well-received in Sarai, but by 1251 appears to have attempted forming an anti-Mongol coalition. Aside from his marriage alliance with Andrey of Vladimir, the recently widowed Danylo himself married the niece of Lithuanian king Mindaugas in the same year. However, when great khan Güyuk also died in 1251, and Andrey was expected to go back to Sarai and receive a renewal of his jarlig as grand prince of Vladimir from Batu in the name the new great khan Möngke, Andrey defiantly refused, even though his brother Alexander Nevsky complied. The Golden Horde interpreted his refusal as a challenge to Mongol authority, and Batu Khan's son Sartak ordered a punitive expedition against Vladimir, while another punitive campaign was sent against Danylo of Halych–Volyn. Andrey was defeated in battle (near Pereslavl') and fled via Novgorod to Sweden. With his brother Andrey exiled, Alexander Nevsky submitted to Möngke Khan, and as a reward for his loyalty to the Golden Horde, he received the throne of Vladimir from the Mongols (1252).

Modern scholars have interpreted these events described in the earliest sources as showing a rivalry between brothers Andrey and Alexander, with Andrey trying to form an anti-Mongol alliance with Danylo, while Alexander was happy to 'collaborate with the Mongols against his own people.' The later hagiographic Life of Alexander Nevsky is almost completely silent on the relations of Andrey, Alexander and Yaroslav, limiting itself to a single sentence in which the Mongols launch a punitive expedition against Andrey, who escapes:

"Later Tsar Baty became angry with Aleksandr’s younger brother, Andrey, and sent his general, Nevruy, to sack the land of Suzdal."

=== Prince of Suzdal (c. 1255/6–1264) ===
In 1255, Andrey returned from exile and travelled to Sarai to ask pardon for his former infidelity. He received Suzdal. On his return to Vladimir, he received from Alexander the easternmost lands of Vladimir, including the towns of Nizhny Novgorod and Gorodets on the Volga. After Alexander died in 1263, Andrey aspired to add Vladimir to his possessions, but was thwarted in his designs by his younger brother Yaroslav of Tver.

== Family ==
He married in 1250/51 to Ustynia, daughter of Daniel of Galicia and had issue:

- Yury of Suzdal (died 8 March 1279).
- Mikhail of Suzdal (died 1305).
- Vasily of Suzdal (died 1309). The Nikon Chronicle gives Vasily the patronymic "Mikhailovich" but that contradicts other genealogical sources.

== See also ==
- Family tree of Russian monarchs

== Bibliography ==
- Isoaho, Mari (2006). The Image of Aleksandr Nevskiy in Medieval Russia: Warrior and Saint. Leiden: Brill. p. 428. ISBN 9789047409496.
- Martin, Janet (2007). Medieval Russia: 980–1584. Second Edition. E-book. Cambridge: Cambridge University Press. ISBN 978-0-511-36800-4.
- Pudalov, B. M. (2004). Русские земли Среднего Поволжья (вторая треть XIII – первая треть XIV в.) [Russian lands of the Middle Volga region (second third of the 13th to first third of the 14th centuries)] (in Russian). Nizhny Novgorod: Комитет по делам архивов Нижегородской области. ISBN 5-93413-023-4.

Andrey II of Vladimir Yurievichi Born: 1222 Died: 1264
Regnal titles
| Preceded by Svyatoslav III | Grand Prince of Vladimir; 1249–1252 | Succeeded by Alexander Nevsky |
