= Grand Prince of Vladimir =

Ancient Russian monarchical title

The Prince of Vladimir, from the 1186 Grand Prince of Vladimir (Russian: Великий князь Владимирский), also translated as Grand Duke of Vladimir, was the title of the monarch of Vladimir-Suzdal. The title was passed to the prince of Moscow in 1389.

== Overview ==
The monarch of Vladimir-Suzdal's title, veliky knyaz or velikii kniaz (Russian: Великий Князь, romanized: velikiy knyaz' / velikii kniaz', Church Slavonic: великꙑи кнѧзь, romanized: velikȳi knęz') is variously translated into English as "grand duke" or "grand prince". Consequently, Vladimir-Suzdal has been interchangeably described as a "grand principality" or "grand duchy". Linguist Alan Timberlake (2000) found that the first time the phrase velikȳi knęz' shows up in the Suzdalian Chronicle (in the Laurentian, Radziwiłł and LPS manuscripts) is under the year 1186, where it is applied to Vsevolod Yurievich. In his early reign from 1177 to 1186, he is simply referred to as "prince Vsevolod" (knęz' (zhe) Vsevolod').

From 1157 to 1238, the principality's capital was Vladimir on the Klyazma, which had been founded in 1108. In 1151 Andrey Bogolyubsky secretly left Vyshgorod, the domain of his father in the Principality of Kiev, and migrated to Suzdal. In 1157, he inherited leadership of the principalities of Vladimir, Suzdal and Rostov. He sacked Kiev in 1169, installing his younger brother Gleb as the new Grand Prince of Kiev.

The city of Vladimir was sacked by a Mongol invasion in 1238. The second important city, Suzdal', was also destroyed by Mongols. The entire principality was then overrun in 1242 by the Mongols under Batu Khan, founder of the Golden Horde. The state of Vladimir-Suzdal (formally the grand principality of Vladimir) became dominant among the various petty northeastern Rus' principalities left after the dissolution of the Kievan Rus' state. The title of Grand Prince of Vladimir became one of the three titles (along with Kiev and Novgorod) possessed by the most important rulers among the Rus' nobility. In the forest region, Vladimir enjoyed hegemony for a time, but it too disintegrated into a series of petty states. By the 14th century, Vladimir-Suzdal had splintered into various appanage principalities including Nizhny Novgorod (Novgorod-Suzdal), Tver and Moscow (Muscovy) who all claimed the title of Grand Prince of Vladimir, and sought to gain the favour of the Tatar-Mongol khan of the Golden Horde to secure it. (Note: During the 14th century, "political history is dominated by the vicious struggle between Moscow and Tver' for supremacy in Vladimir-Suzdalia. In the drive for power, both states had to address Sarai, for the Golden Horde had the uncontested prerogative of determining succession to the symbolic throne of the grand prince of Vladimir. In this new political climate, the Mongols abandoned the now obsolete policy of respecting the traditional Russian lines of succession.") In the early 14th century, the khan awarded the title to Yury of Moscow to counterbalance the strength of Tver; and after the Tver Uprising of 1327, which the Muscovites helped put down, Özbeg Khan named Ivan "Kalita" of Moscow the new grand prince of Vladimir.

By the mid-14th century and especially during the Great Troubles (1359–1382), the khan's alliance with Moscow made the latter militarily and administratively powerful enough to economically and demographically devastate its rivals, notably Tver. The khans therefore started awarding the grand princely title to Moscow's rivals. In 1353, Konstantin Vasilyevich of Nizhny Novgorod-Suzdal unsuccessfully tried to obtain the title of grand prince of Vladimir, and in 1371 it was awarded to Mikhail II of Tver. But by that time it was too late for the Golden Horde to curb the rise of Muscovy. Tokhtamysh allowed Vasily I of Moscow to succeed his father Dmitry Donskoy as grand prince of Vladimir in 1389.

Yurievichi connection of Moscow, Novgorod-Suzdal, and Tver

Yaroslav II of Vladimir; G. P. of Vladimir (1238–1246); Grandson of Yurievichi progenitor Yuri Dolgorukiy
Alexander Nevsky; Prince of Novgorod (~1246~1259); G. P. of Vladimir (1252–1263)	Andrey II of Vladimir; Prince of Suzdal (1256–1264); G. P. of Vladimir (1249–1252)	Yaroslav of Tver; Prince of Tver (1247–1271); G. P. of Vladimir (1263–1271)
Daniel of Moscow; Prince of Moscow (1283–1303); Daniilovichi progenitor	Konstantin of Suzdal; Prince of Nizhny; Novgorod-Suzdal (1341–1355)	Mikhail of Tver; Prince of Tver (1285–1318); G. P. of Vladimir (1304–1318)

== List ==
Monarch	Regnal name	Lifespan	Relationship with predecessor(s)	Reigned from	Reigned until
Andrey Bogolyubsky	Andrey I	1110–1174	Son of Yuri Dolgorukiy	15 May 1157	28 June 1174
Mikhail of Vladimir	Mikhail I	?–1176	Brother of Andrey Bogolyubsky	1174	September 1174
Yaropolk Rostislavich	Yaropolk	?–after 1196	Grandson of Vladimir II Monomakh	1174	15 June 1175
Mikhail of Vladimir (again)	Mikhail I	?–1176	Brother of Andrei Bogolyubsky	15 June 1175	20 June 1176
Vsevolod the Big Nest first to be called "grand prince" from 1186 onwards	Vsevolod III	19 October 1154– 15 April 1212	Brother of Andrei Bogolyubsky; Brother of Mikhail of Vladimir	June 1176	15 April 1212
Yuri II of Vladimir	Yuri II	26 November 1188– 4 March 1238	Son of Vsevolod the Big Nest	1212	27 April 1216
Konstantin of Rostov	Konstantin	1186–1218	Son of Vsevolod the Big Nest	Spring 1216	2 February 1218
Yuri II of Vladimir (again)	Yuri II	1189–1238	Son of Vsevolod the Big Nest	February 1218	4 March 1238
Yaroslav II of Vladimir	Yaroslav II	1191–1238	Son of Vsevolod the Big Nest	1238	30 September 1246
Sviatoslav III of Vladimir	Sviatoslav III	1196–3 February 1252	Son of Vsevolod the Big Nest	1246	1248
Mikhail Khorobrit	Mikhail?	1229–15 January 1248	Son of Yaroslav II of Vladimir	1248	15 January 1248
Sviatoslav III of Vladimir (again)	Sviatoslav III	1196– 3 February 1252	Son of Vsevolod the Big Nest	1248	1249
Andrey II of Vladimir	Andrey II	1221–1264	Son of Yaroslav II of Vladimir	December 1249	24 July 1252
Alexander Nevsky	Alexander I	1220–1263	Son of Yaroslav II of Vladimir	1252	14 November 1263
Yaroslav of Tver	Yaroslav III	1230–1272	Son of Yaroslav II of Vladimir	1264	1271
Vasily of Kostroma	Vasily	1241–1276	Son of Yaroslav II of Vladimir	1272	January 1276
Dmitry of Pereslavl	Dmitry?	1250–1294	Son of Alexander Nevsky	1276	1281
Andrey of Gorodets	Andrey III	1255–1304	Son of Alexander Nevsky	1281	December 1283
Dmitry of Pereslavl (again)	Dmitry?	1250–1294	Son of Alexander Nevsky	December 1283	1293
Andrey of Gorodets (again)	Andrey III	1255–1304	Son of Alexander Nevsky	1293	1304
Mikhail of Tver	Mikhail?	1271–1318	Son of Yaroslav of Tver	Autumn 1304	22 November 1318
Yuri of Moscow	Yuri III	1281–1325	Grandson of Alexander Nevsky	1318	2 November 1322
Dmitry of Tver the Fearsome Eyes	Dmitry I	1299–1326	Son of Mikhail of Tver	1322	15 September 1326
Aleksandr Mikhailovich of Tver	Alexander II	1281–1339	Son of Mikhail of Tver	1326	1327
Alexander of Suzdal	Alexander III	c. 1300–1331	Grandson of Andrey II of Vladimir	1328	1331
Ivan I of Moscow Kalita	Ivan I	1288–1340	Grandson of Alexander Nevsky	1332	31 March 1340
Simeon of Moscow	Simeon	1317–1353	Son of Ivan I of Moscow	1340	1353
Ivan II of Moscow	Ivan II	1326–1359	Son of Ivan I of Moscow	1353	1359
Dmitry of Suzdal	Dmitry?	1323–1383	Great-grandson of Andrey of Gorodets	1359	1362
Dmitry Donskoy	Dmitry?	1350–1389	Son of Ivan II of Moscow	1362	1371
Mikhail II of Tver	Mikhail?	1333–1399	Son of Aleksandr Mikhailovich of Tver	1371	1375
Dmitry Donskoy (again)	Dmitry?	1350–1389	Son of Ivan II of Moscow	1375	1389

== See also ==
- Grand Prince of Kiev
- Prince of Tver

== Bibliography ==
- Halperin, Charles J. (1987). Russia and the Golden Horde: The Mongol Impact on Medieval Russian History. p. 222. ISBN 9781850430575. (e-book).
- Martin, Janet (2007). Medieval Russia: 980–1584. Second Edition. E-book. Cambridge: Cambridge University Press. ISBN 978-0-511-36800-4.
- Timberlake, Alan (2000). "Who Wrote the Laurentian Chronicle (1177–1203)?". Zeitschrift für Slavische Philologie. 59 (2). Universitätsverlag WINTER: 237–265.
