= John Lister Illingworth Fennell =

British historian (1918–1992)

John Lister Illingworth Fennell (30 May 1918 – 9 August 1992) was a British historian of medieval Russian history and of Russian literature. He was Professor of Russian at the University of Oxford from 1967 to 1985.

== Education and career ==
Fennell was educated at Radley College and Trinity College, Cambridge, where he read modern languages and completed MA (Cantab) and PhD degrees. He taught at Cambridge, Nottingham, and London universities, and from 1964 at Oxford, where he was a fellow first at University College, and later at New College. He was made a Fellow of the Royal Society of Literature in 1980, and retired in 1985. His speciality was as an historian, translator, philologist, editor, and teacher of advanced students.

== Work ==
His speciality was the reign of Ivan III (1462–1505) and 15th-century Russia. In evaluating the overall significance of Ivan III, Fennell concludes that his reign was "militarily glorious and economically sound", and especially points to his territorial annexations and his centralized control over local rulers. However, Fennell adds that his reign was also "a period of cultural depression and spiritual barrenness. Freedom was stamped out within the Russian lands. By his bigoted anti-Catholicism Ivan brought down the curtain between Russia and the west. For the sake of territorial aggrandizement he deprived his country of the fruits of Western learning and civilization."

Martin Dimnik said of Fennell, "His achievements are unrivaled in the West, and almost so in the Soviet Union and Russia".

== Bibliography ==
- — (1955). The Correspondence Between Prince A.M. Kurbsky and Tsar Ivan IV of Russia, 1564–1579. Oxford University Press.
- — (1959). Ivan the Great of Moscow. Macmillan.
- —, ed. (1965). Prince A. M. Kurbsky's History of Ivan IV. Cambridge University Press.
- — (1968). The emergence of Moscow, 1304–1359. University of California Press. ISBN 9780436152504.
- —; Unbegaun, Boris Ottokar (1968). The Ermolinskij Chronicle and the Literary Prelude to "The Tale of the Murder of Mixail of Tver". New York University Press.
- —; Stokes, Antony (1974). Early Russian literature. University of California Press. ISBN 978-0-520-02343-7.
- — (1976). Nineteenth Century Russian Literature: Studies of Ten Russian Writers. University of California Press. ISBN 978-0-520-03203-3.
- — (1981). Textology as a Key to the Study of Old Russian Literature and History. AMS Press.
- — (1983). The crisis of medieval Russia, 1200–1304. Longman. ISBN 978-0-582-48150-3.
- — (1995). A History of the Russian Church to 1448. Longman. ISBN 978-2-07-037805-0.
