= Illustrated Chronicle of Ivan the Terrible =

Compilation of historical information

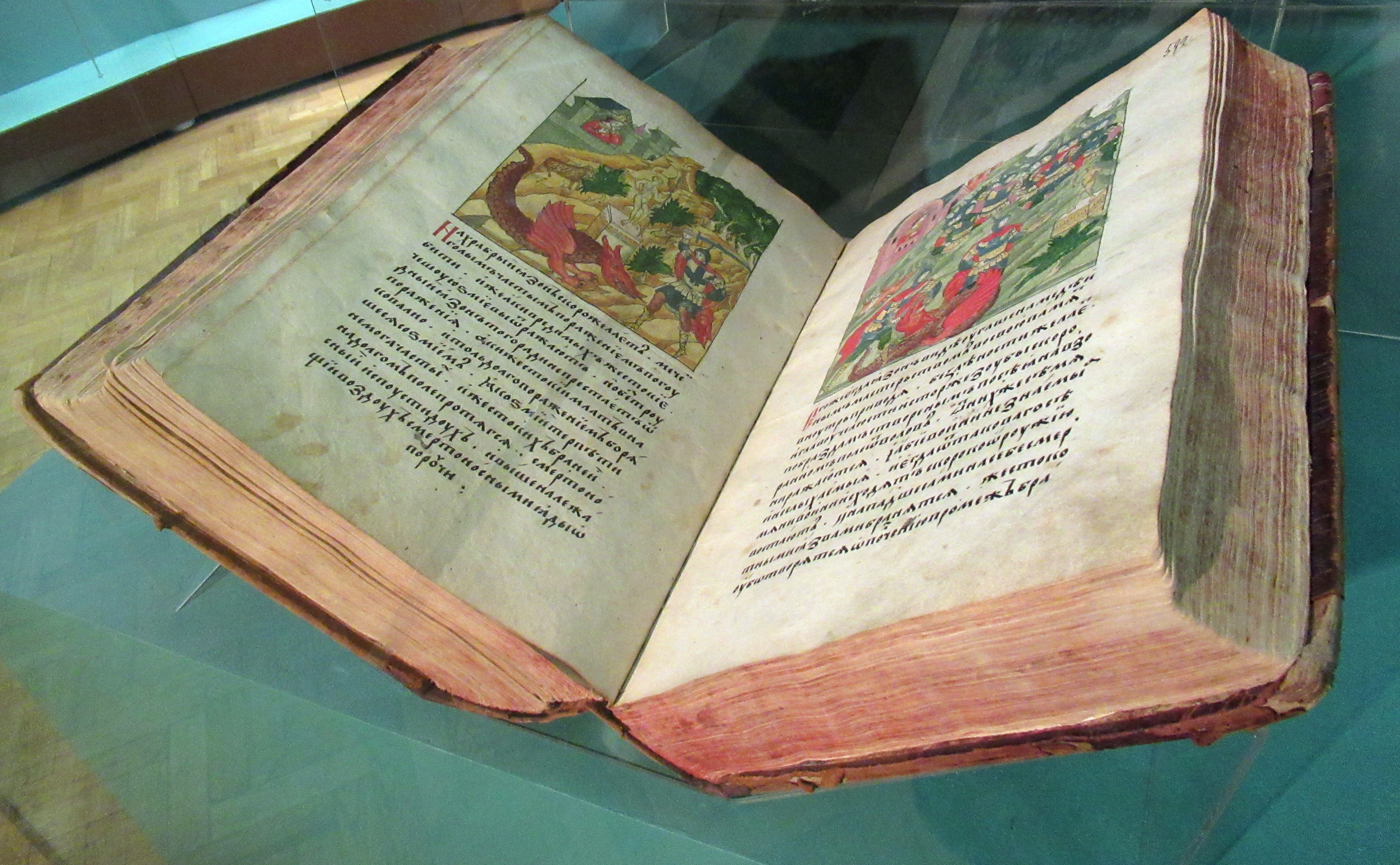

The Illustrated Chronicle of Ivan the Terrible (Russian: Лицевой летописный свод, romanized: Litsevoy letopisny svod; 1560-1570s) is the largest compilation of historical information ever assembled in medieval Russia. It is also informally known as the Tsar Book (Russian: Царь-книга, romanized: Tsar-kniga), in an analogy with the Tsar Bell and Tsar Cannon.

The literal meaning of the Russian title is "face chronicle," alluding to the numerous hand-painted miniatures. The compilation consists of 10 volumes, containing about 10 thousand sheets of rag paper, it is illustrated with more than 16 thousand miniatures. The book is the most important source for illustrating the medieval history of East Slavic lands.

The set of manuscripts was commissioned by tsar Ivan the Terrible and was made by a group of anonymous manuscript illuminators in the Tsar's palace in Alexandrovskaya Sloboda and Moscow. It was never completed, with some miniatures left uncolored.

The text of the "Tsar Book" is based on the Nikon Chronicle and covers the period from the creation of the world (including the Trojan War, Ancient Rome and Byzantium) to the year 1567.

== Volumes ==
The volumes are grouped in a relatively chronological order and include four major areas: Biblical History, History of Rome, History of Byzantium, and Russian history.

The titles and contents of the 10 volumes are:

1. Museum Miscellany (Музейский сборник, State Historical Museum) – 1,031 pages, 1,677 miniatures. Sacred Hebrew and Greek history, from the creation of the world to the destruction of Troy in the 13th century BC.
2. Chronograph Miscellany (Хронографический сборник, Library of the Russian Academy of Sciences) – 1,469 pages, 2,549 miniatures. History of the ancient East, the Hellenistic world, and ancient Rome from the 11th century BC to the 70s in the 1st century AD.
3. Face Chronograph (Лицевой хронограф, Russian National Library) – 1,217 pages, 2,191 miniature. History of the ancient Roman Empire from the 70s in the 1st century to 337 AD, and Byzantine history to the 10th century.
4. Galitzine Volume (Голицынский том, RNL) – 1,035 pages, 1,964 miniatures. Russian history from 1114 to 1247 and 1425–1472.
5. Laptev Volume (Лаптевский том, RNL, F.IV.233) – 1,005 pages, 1,951 miniatures. Russian history from 1116 to 1252.
6. Osterman Volume I (Остермановский первый том, LRAS) – 802 pages, 1,552 miniatures. Russian history from 1254 to 1378.
7. Osterman Volume II (Остермановский второй том, LRAS) – 887 pages, 1,581 miniature. Russian history from 1378 to 1424.
8. Shumilov Volume (Шумиловский том, RNL) – 986 pages, 1,893 miniatures. Russian history in 1425, and 1478–1533.
9. Synod Volume (Синодальный том, SHM) – 626 pages, 1,125 miniatures. Russian history from 1533 to 1542, and 1553–1567.
10. Regal Book (Царственная книга, SHM) – 687 pages, 1,291 miniature. Russian history from 1533 to 1553.
Examples of illustrations

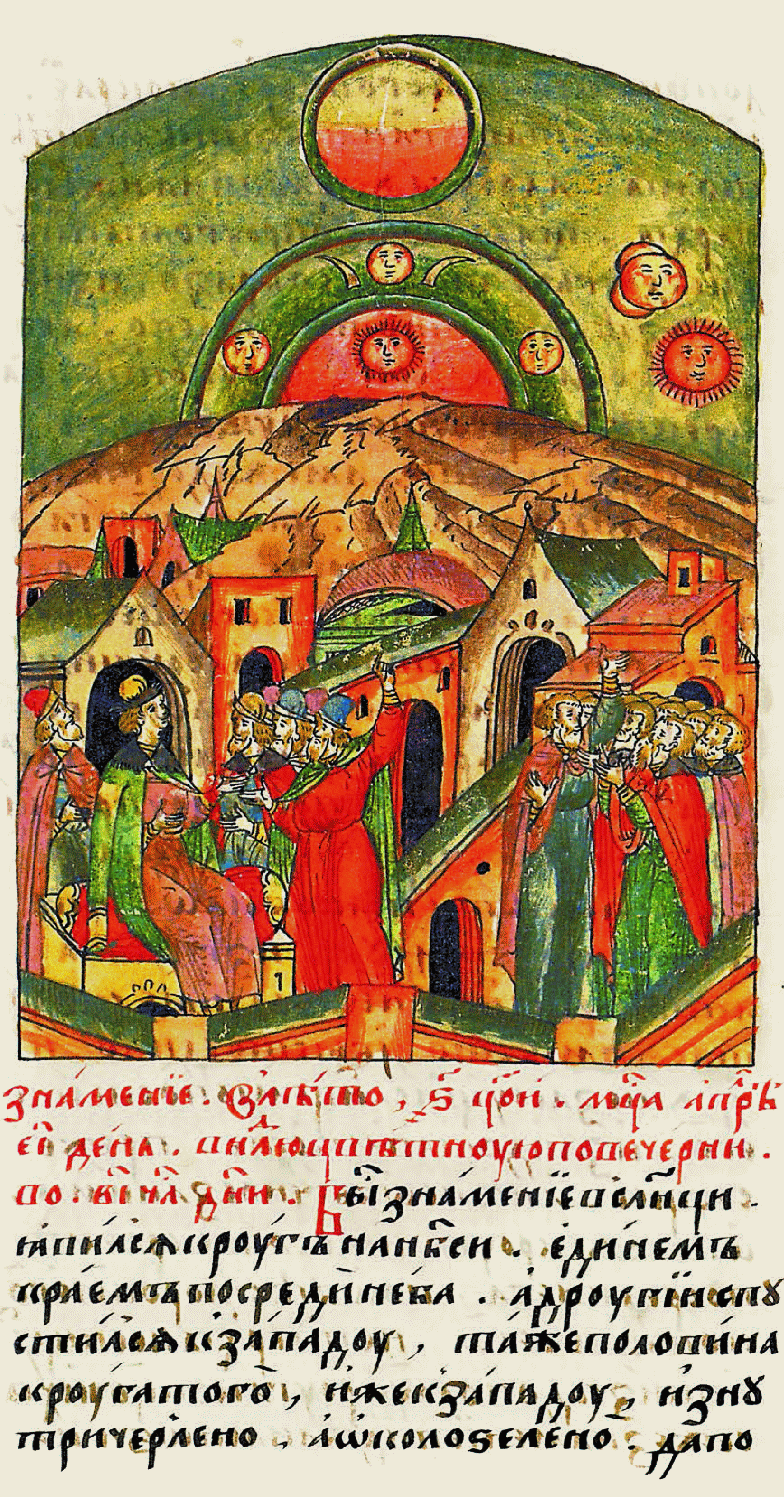
Solar eclipses in 1470

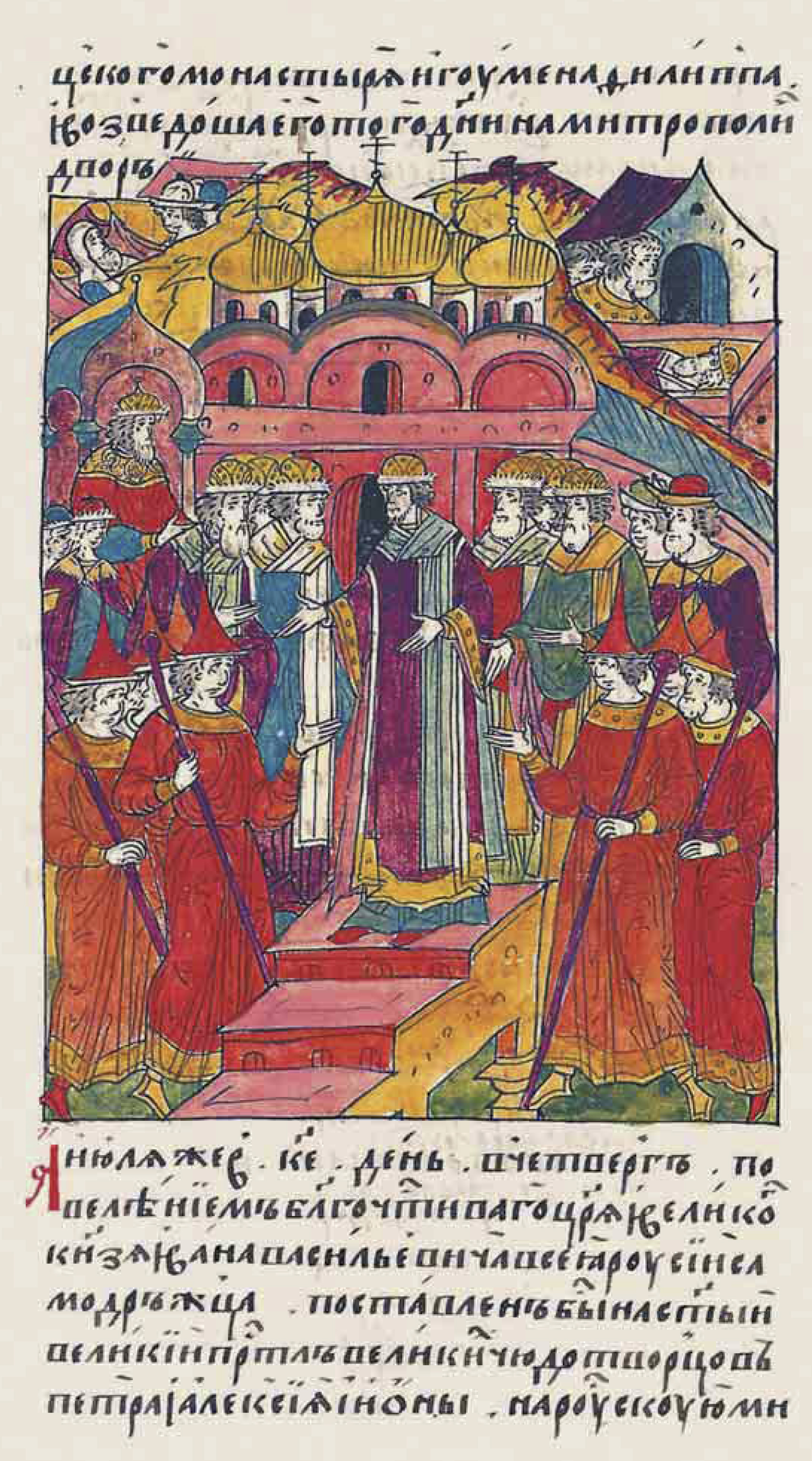
Philip II, Metropolitan of Moscow

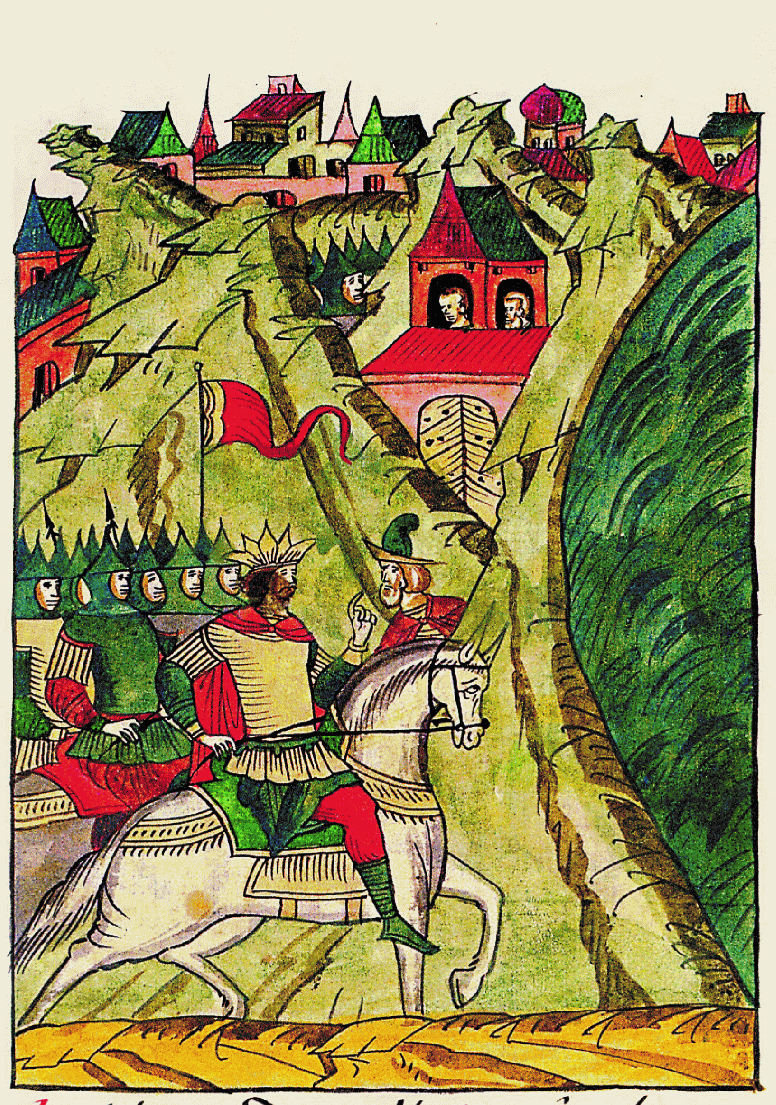
Timur

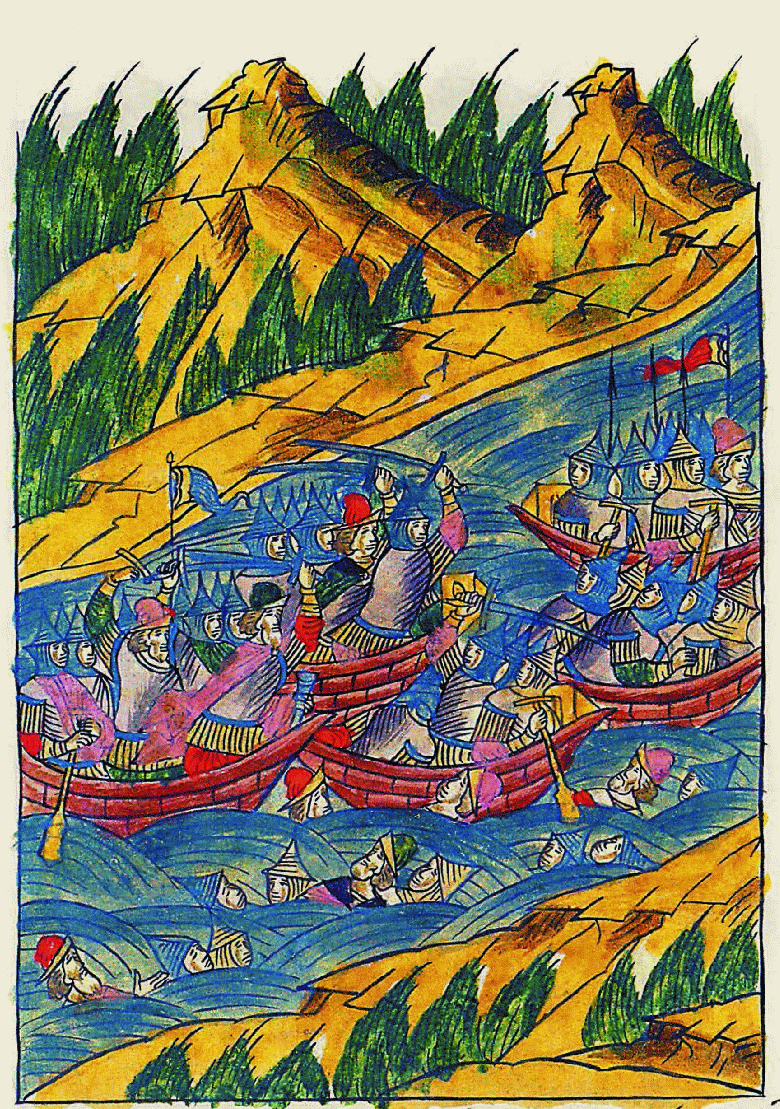
Battle with Tatars at Volga-river
