= Of Tver =

Toponymic epithet

Of Tver is a toponymic epithet associated the Principality of Tver or the city of Tver. Notable people with this epithet include:

- Aleksandr of Tver
- Boris of Tver
- Dmitry of Tver
- Konstantin of Tver
- Maria of Tver
- Mikhail of Tver
- Mikhail II of Tver
- Mikhail III of Tver
- Uliana of Tver
- Vasily of Tver
- Vsevolod of Tver
- Yaroslav of Tver

== Other ==
- Anthemius of Novgorod
- Stephen of Novgorod

== See also ==
- Prince of Tver
