= Mikhail II of Tver =

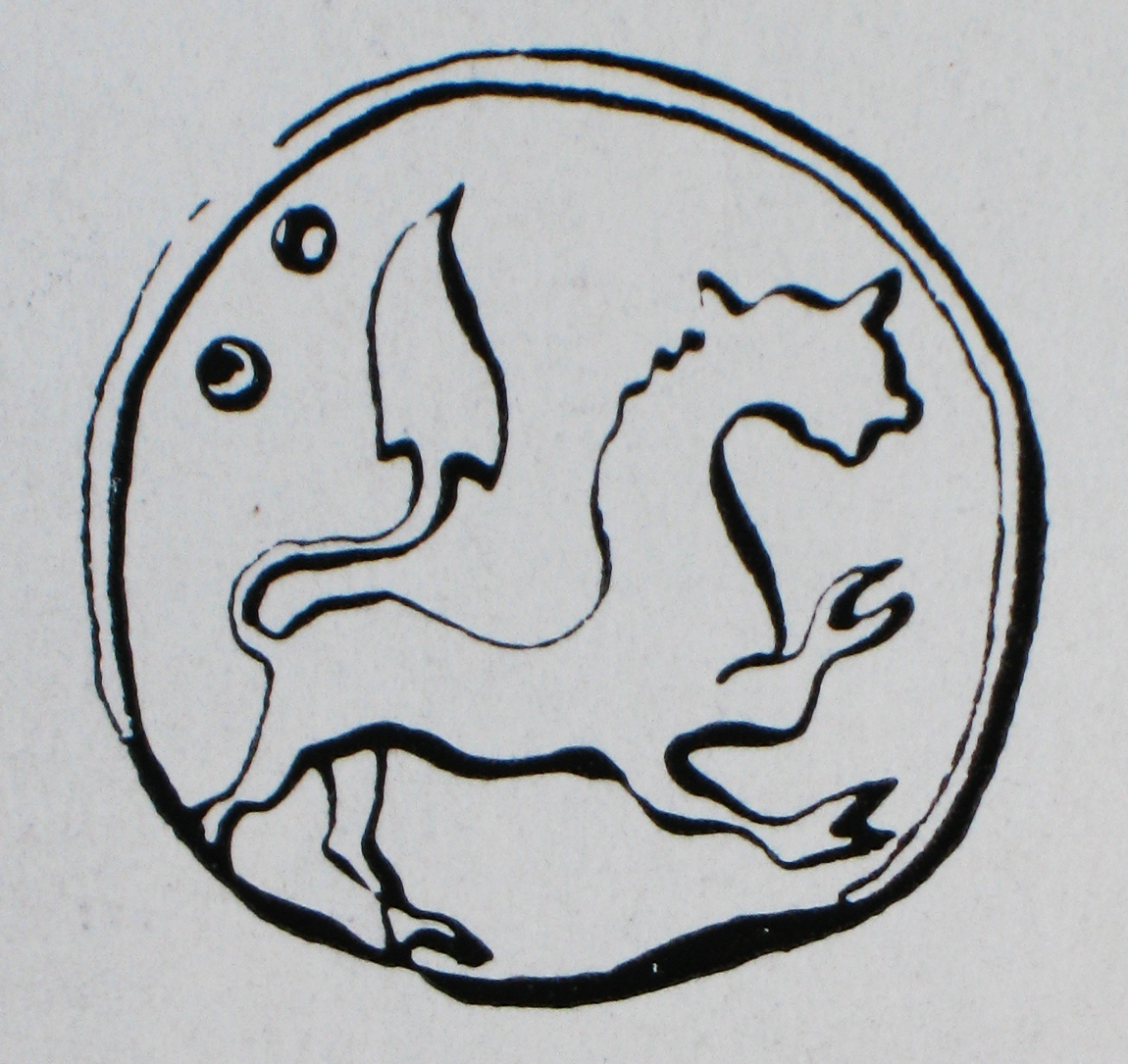

Mikhail Alexandrovich (Russian: Михаил Александрович) (1333 – August 26, 1399) was Grand Prince of Tver and briefly held the title of Grand Prince of Vladimir. He was one of only two Tver princes after 1317 (the other was his father, Aleksandr) to hold the grand princely title, which was almost the exclusive purview of the Muscovite princes.

Mikhail Alexandrovich was the third son of Aleksandr Mikhailovich of Tver. Mikhail grew up in Pskov, where his father had fled after the Tver Uprising of 1327. He was christened by the Archbishop of Novgorod, Vasily Kalika, in 1333. Five years later, he and his mother were called to Tver when Aleksandr returned to the city. In 1341, he went to Novgorod where Archbishop Vasily taught him reading and writing (which would have meant reading the Scriptures). In 1368, he became prince of Tver.

Mikhail Alexandrovich was among the last princes to seriously threaten the Grand Duchy of Moscow for possession of the office of Grand Prince of Vladimir, hoping to unseat Moscow with the aid of his brother-in-law Algirdas, Grand Duke of Lithuania. In 1371, he gained the yarlik or patent of office as Grand Prince of Vladimir from the Khan of the Golden Horde and was accepted as Prince of Novgorod, an important economic asset for any Russian prince. He seems to have lost power the following year when Algirdas concluded the Treaty of Lyubutsk with Dmitri Donskoi of Moscow, but it is not clear who was considered grand prince between 1372 and 1375, at which time Dmitri Donskoi defeated Mikhail.

== Ancestry ==
Ancestors of Mikhail II of Tver

16. Yaroslav II of Vladimir
8. Yaroslav of Tver
17. Fedosia Igorevna
4. Mikhail of Tver
18. Youri Mikhailovich (son of Michael of Chernigov)
9. Xenia of Tarusa
2. Aleksandr Mikhailovich of Tver
20. Boris Vasylkovych (son of Vasilko Konstantinovich)
10. Dmitry Borisovich
21. Maria Yaroslavna, Princess of Murom
5. Anna of Kashin
1.Mikhail II of Tver
24. Daniel of Galicia
12. Leo I of Galicia
25. Anna of Toropets
6. Yuri I of Galicia
26. Béla IV of Hungary
13. Constance of Hungary, Queen of Galicia
27. Maria Laskarina
3. Anastasia of Halych
28. Conrad I of Mazovia
14. Casimir I of Kuyavia
29. Agafia of Rus
7. Euphemia of Kuyavia
30. Casimir I of Opole
15. Euphrosyne of Opole
31. Viola, Duchess of Opole

Preceded by Dmitry Donskoy	Grand Prince of Vladimir; 1371–1375	Succeeded by Dmitry Donskoy
Preceded by Vasily of Kashin	Prince of Tver; 1368–1399	Succeeded by Ivan of Tver
