= Anna of Kashin =

Russian princess and saint

Saint Anna of Kashin
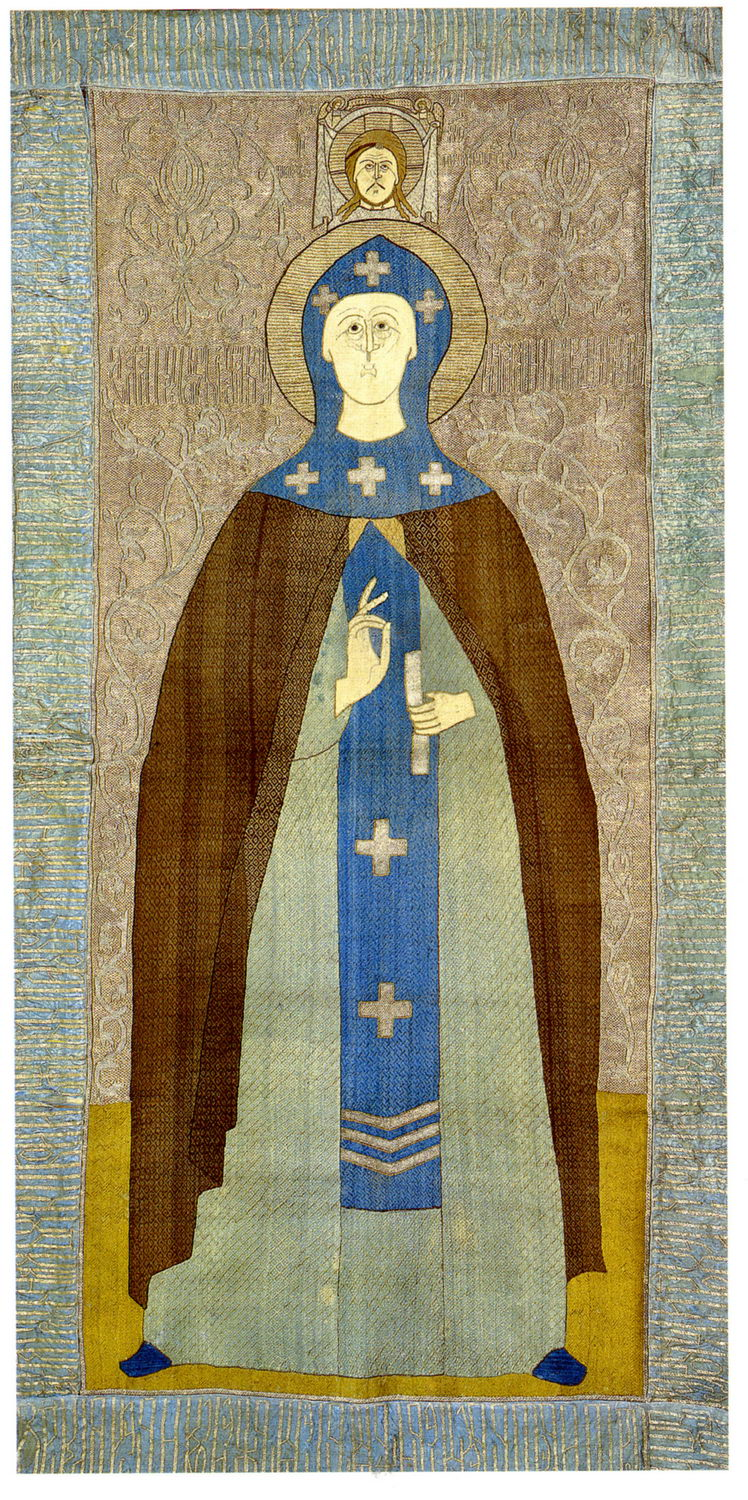
- Sewn portrait of Anne before 1645

Right-Believing and Venerable
- Born: c. 1280; Rostov
- Died: 2 October 1368 (aged 87–88); Kashin
- Venerated in: Eastern Orthodox Church
- Canonized: 1650 by Russian Orthodox Church
- Major shrine: Cathedral of Christ's Resurrection, Kashin, Russia
- Feast: 24 June (opening of her relics)
- Patronage: widows and orphans; Kashin and Tver
- Catholic cult suppressed: 1677 by Patriarch Joachim of Moscow; 12 June 1909 cultus reestablished

Anna of Kashin (Russian: Анна Кашинская; c. 1280 – 2 October 1368) was the princess consort of Mikhail of Tver. She is venerated as a saint and Right-Believing princess, patroness of Kashin and Tver.

She is known both for her dramatic lifetime fate (the death of almost all relatives during internecine strife) and for no less complicated posthumous vicissitudes: she was canonized by the Russian Orthodox Church in 1650, but the struggle of the times of the schism of the Russian Church in the 17th century led to her decanonization in 1677 — a precedent in the history of the Russian Church. However, in 1908, her sainthood was officially restored by Nicholas II. On next year, crowded celebrations in Kashin were held on the occasion of the restoration of the veneration.

== Life ==
Anna was a daughter of Prince Dmitry Borisovich of Rostov and a great-granddaughter of Prince Vasily of Rostov. From her earliest years, Anna was brought up strictly Christian. She was taught the virtues of humility and obedience. Her teacher was Ignatius, Bishop of Rostov (died 1288), who was noted for strict selflessness and pacifism. Like all royal daughters of her time, Anna learned different kinds of needlework. When the princess grew up, Princess Xenia of Tver, second wife of Grand Prince Yaroslav of Tver sent ambassadors to Rostov with a request to marry Anna to her son Mikhail. The embassy was successful, and Anna became the wife of Prince Mikhail.

Princess Anna's marriage to Prince Mikhail took place on 8 November 1294 in the Preobrazhensky cathedral of Tver. In celebration of this event, dwellers in the city of Kashin built the Saint Michael Church and the triumphal gates from the local Kremlin to the Tver road, naming the gates also "Mikhaylovsky." In the Kashin Uspensky cathedral a special feast was established and celebrated annually on 8 November.

Anna and Mikhail had five children:

1. Feodora (died in infancy)
2. Prince Dmitry of Tver (1299–1326)
3. Prince Alexander of Tver (1301–1339)
4. Prince Konstantin of Tver (1306–1346)
5. Prince Vasily of Kashin (d. after 1368)

In 1294, her father died, and in 1295 a terrible fire destroyed Tver. Soon after that, Anna and Mikhail's first-born daughter, Feodora, fell severely ill and died in infancy. In 1296, another fire destroyed their palace, and the prince and princess were barely rescued. In 1317, a war began between Yury of Moscow and Anna's husband prince Mikhail of Tver.

In 1318 the princess said goodbye to her husband forever when he was summoned to the Horde, where he was brutally tortured to death on 22 November 1318. Only in July of the following year did Anna hear about her husband's martyrdom. Learning that Mikhail's remains had been brought to Moscow, she sent an embassy there, and her husband's body was transferred into Tver and buried in Preobrazhensky cathedral.

In 1325, her eldest son, Dimitry, was tortured in the Horde. In 1327, her second son, Alexander, broke the Tartar army, which devastated the duchy. In revenge Uzbeg Khan gathered a new army and destroyed Tver; Prince Alexander was forced to hide in Pskov. For ten years, Anna did not see her son, and in 1339 Prince Alexander and his son Feodor were killed by the Horde.

After the death of Prince Mikhail, Anna carried out an old desire "in silence to work only for God." She took vows in Sofia's monastery in Tver and adopted the name Evfrosiniya. In 1365 the youngest son of the princess, Vasiliy, her only child remaining alive by that time, entreated his mother to move to his principality. The Uspensky monastery was built in Kashin, and there she accepted the schema with the name of Anna.

She died of old age on 2 October 1368, and was buried in the cathedral temple of the Blessed Virgin.

== Canonization and Veneration ==
Icon of Holy Anna of Kashin.

The name of the Princess Anna was forgotten for many centuries. It was during the 1611 siege of Kashin by Lithuanian troops that Anna appeared to Gerasim, Sexton of the Dormition Cathedral, and it is said that she prayed to the Saviour and Our Lady for the deliverance of her city from the foreigners. Her relics were reported to work miracles.

The synod of the Russian Orthodox Church convened in 1649 and declared her relics worthy of a universal homage, and the princess was glorified as a saint. Twenty-eight years later, Patriarch Joachim addressed the Moscow Synod with a suggestion to decanonize her because of the uncommon veneration and esteem for Anna among the schismatic sect of Old Believers.

It was traditionally thought the Old Believers chose Anna as their palladium because the princess was represented on icons as making the Sign of the Cross with two fingers, as the Old Believers practiced, rather than with three, as official church policy required after Patriarch Nikon in 1656. Writings used by the Old Believers say that one of the reasons they venerated her so highly was that her incorrupt body, on display, showed her hand in the two-fingered way, vindicating their stance. Despite numerous efforts of the church authorities to change the situation, her hand always went back to the same two-fingered position. In response, Patriarch Joachim removed the relics of Anna from public view.

In the Grand Synod of the Russian Orthodox Church, held in Moscow from January to February 1678, Patriarch Joachim re-affirmed the decanonization of Anna of Kashin: It was also forbidden to ask for her intercessions, and it was allowed only to pray for her.

On October 30, 1908, the Most Holy Synod sought the Emperor's consent to restore the church-wide veneration of Anna of Kashin, which was given by decree of November 7, 1908. On April 11, 1909, the Most Holy Synod designated June 12 as Anna's memorial day. On this day, crowded celebrations were held in Kashin on the occasion of the restoration of the veneration of the saint, which were attended by Grand Duchess Elizabeth Feodorovna. After that, every year on June 12, a procession with the icon of Anna of Kashin was held in Kashin throughout the town.

In 1909 a monastic community was dedicated to her in Grozny. A year later, a church was consecrated in her name in St Petersburg.

On April 18, 2023, at a regular meeting of the Tver City Duma, they considered the proposal of metropolitan Ambrose (Yermakov), to assign the name of the Holy Princess Anna to the square located in front of the new Wedding Palace in Tver and made a positive decision. There is a monument to St. Anna and her husband, the Holy Prince Michael, on the square.

== Bibliography ==
- (in Russian) S. Arkhangelov. Житие и чудеса святой благоверной княгини Анны Кашинской, St Petersburg, 1909
- (in Russian) Манухина Т. Святая благоверная княгиня Анна Кашинская. — Париж: YMCA-PRESS, 1954. — 195 с.

== Sources ==
- "Анна, святые русские" . Brockhaus and Efron Encyclopedic Dictionary (in Russian). 1906.
