= Vasily of Tver =

Prince of Tver from 1349 to 1368

Vasily Mikhailovich
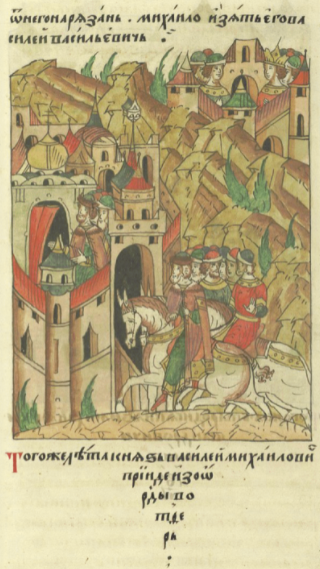
- Vasily returns from the Horde, miniature from the Illustrated Chronicle of Ivan the Terrible (16th century)

Prince of Tver
- Reign: 1349–1368
- Predecessor: Vsevolod
- Successor: Mikhail II
- Died: 24 July 1368
- House: Rurik
- Father: Mikhail of Tver
- Mother: Anna of Kashin

Vasily Mikhailovich (Russian: Василий Михайлович; died 24 July 1368) was Prince of Tver from 1349 until his death in 1368. He was the youngest son of Mikhail of Tver.

== Early life ==
Vasily was the youngest of the four sons of Mikhail of Tver by his wife Anna of Kashin. In 1319, he received Kashin from his father as an appanage.

After a popular uprising against the Tatars in 1327, Vasily fled Tver along with his brother Konstantin to Ladoga. They did not stay there for long and returned to Tver after it had been devastated, where at first "they sat in great poverty and misery, for the land of Tver was empty". Afterwards, they "bit by bit began gathering people and consoling them from great sorrow and grief". As their elder brother Aleksandr had fled and was in exile, Konstantin received the yarlyk (patent) for the principality from the khan.

Upon learning of Konstantin's death in 1346, Vasily went to the Horde to receive the yarlyk for the principality of Tver, as he considered himself to be the rightful heir. Knowing that he could not go to the khan and his entourage empty-handed, he sent his tax collectors to the appanage of his nephew, Vsevolod, to collect tribute while Vsevolod was absent. Vsevolod, who was already at the Horde, received the patent for the principality from Jani Beg, and on the way back, he intercepted Vasily at the town of Bezdezh and "robbed him", leaving him empty-handed and forcing him to return to his patrimony. The feud with Vsevolod continued, leading to internecine fighting, as evidenced by what the Nikon Chronicle says: "The Tverites suffered sorely and many of them scattered abroad because of this derangement (nestroeniyd)". It is also possible that Jani Beg once again confirmed his decision by sending Vsevolod back to Tver with the yarlyk in 1348.

The Nikon Chronicle, which is the only source of information about the feud, says that Feodor, the bishop of Tver, convinced the two parties to make peace and to amicably discuss the dynastic issue. Vasily and Vsevolod signed a treaty and the latter surrendered his throne to Vasily in 1349. Vsevolod then retired to his appanage while Vasily moved into the capital. The chronicle says: "Vasily Mikhaylovich... began to live with his nephew... in peace and great love. And people came from all around to their cities, to their districts and to the land of Tver', and the people multiplied and rejoiced with great rejoicing".

== Reign ==
The Tatars had given the arrangement their unofficial blessing, but it was not until 1352 that a Tatar posol (ambassador) arrived in Tver and gave Vasily the yarlyk for the principality. However, Vasily "began to bear a grudge against his nephew Prince Vsevolod Aleksandrovich of Kholm, recalling the robbery at Bezdezh (where Vsevolod had relieved him of the tribute in 1346)". This led to another period of civil strife as Vasily targeted Kholm again. The Nikon Chronicle says: "He began to offend the boyars and servants [of Vsevolod] with heavy taxation and there was lack of faith and hostility between them". In 1357, Vsevolod decided to bring the case to Alexius, the newly appointed head of the Russian Orthodox Church, but the metropolitan did not listen to his complaints. Ivan II of Moscow decided to resume the treaty of friendship with Kashin, and both Vasily and the bishop of Tver, Feodor, went to Vladimir to discuss matters with the metropolitan; however, these talks did not lead to anything.

Vasily went to the Horde along with Ivan and the other Russian princes after Berdi Beg became khan in 1357, while Vsevolod was not allowed to go and was stopped on his way at Pereyaslavl by Ivan's governors. Vasily returned to Tver in April 1358 with his patent renewed. Vsevolod had set off to Sarai in an attempt to contest his uncle's title, but the khan arrested him "without judgement" and he was forced to return to Tver. Vasily waited for him and had Vsevolod and his retinue ransomed for a large sum by the "black people" of Kholm. The feud led to the bishop of Tver, Feodor, to resign; however, the metropolitan was able to convince him to remain at his post.

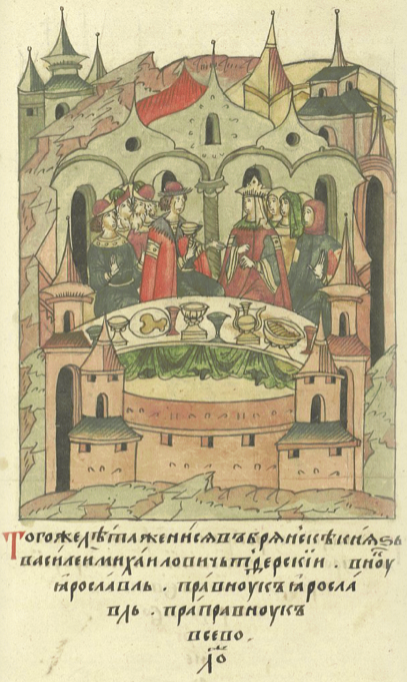
The marriage of Vasily and Elena of Bryansk, miniature from the Illustrated Chronicle of Ivan the Terrible (16th century)

After the troops of Tver and Mozhaysk recaptured Rzhev from the Lithuanians in 1358–1359, Vsevolod left for Lithuania to strengthen ties with his brother-in-law, Grand Duke Algirdas. Vasily sent two ambassadors to the khan and Berdi Beg ordered for Vsevolod to be handed over to his uncle "without trial". In 1359–1360, Vsevolod once again fled to Lithuania, and in 1360–1361, the newly appointed metropolitan of Lithuania, Roman, visited Tver and was unable to win the sympathy of Feodor. Roman was escorted to Lithuania "with honor" and Vasily was pressured to give Vsevolod a third of his patrimony. Ekkehard Klug explains this by noting that Vasily had no outside help, as when Ivan II had died in 1359, his son Dmitry was only nine years old at the time and Dmitry of Suzdal took advantage of the situation by obtaining the yarlyk for the grand principality from the khan.

At the beginning of 1362, the Lithuanians attacked Tver and the chronicle says that "Prince Mikhail Aleksandrovich made peace with Olgerd" in 1362–1363, although nothing is known about the conditions of the peace treaty. The sources do not indicate any territorial losses for Tver, and it is possible that without the support of Moscow, Vasily instead sent his nephew Mikhail Aleksandrovich, the appanage prince of Mikulin, to conclude peace with Olgerd. Following this, the chronicle says that in 1363–1364, "Prince Vasily Mikhailovich, with his army, went to Mikulin against Prince Mikhail of Tver, Aleksandrovich, his nephew, and again they reconciled and made peace". Mikhail gained popularity for concluding peace with Lithuania, making Mikhail a competitor to the sons of Vasily Mikhailovich.

As four of the six nephews of Vasily, including Vsevolod, had died during a plague epidemic from November 1365 to February 1366, Mikhail Aleksandrovich strengthened his position in the principality by securing control over territories that had belonged to his brothers; in addition, Semyon, the son of Konstantin, bequeathed his father's inheritance of Bely Gorodok not to his brother Yeremey, but to Mikhail. After Vasily's son Vasily Vasilyevich had died, his son Mikhail Vasilyevich asserted his right to the throne. Mikhail Aleksandrovich knew that the grand prince, Dmitry Ivanovich, and the Russian metropolitan, Alexius, supported his uncle, so he went to Lithuania for support in 1367. Vasily, along with Yeremey and his son Mikhail, launched a military campaign against Gorodok, where Mikhail Aleksandrovich had recently founded a fortress, but failed to take it. Mikhail Aleksandrovich returned with a Lithuanian army for a surprise attack and he captured the wives of Vasily and Yeremey, as well as many of their boyars. The two parties concluded peace and the Trinity Chronicle reports that Mikhail Aleksandrovich recognized the priority of his uncle Vasily as the legitimate grand prince of Tver. The peace was fragile, as Yeremey broke the oath he made to Mikhail Aleksandrovich and went to Moscow, and Mikhail was pressured to cede Gorodok to Yeremey. Vasily died on 24 July 1368 in Kashin while preparations for the next stage of the conflict were being made.

== Family ==
Vasily had two sons by his wife Elena of Bryansk:

1. Vasily Vasilyevich (died 1362), prince of Kashin;
2. Mikhail Vasilyevich (died 1373), prince of Kashin, married to Vasilisa of Moscow.

== See also ==
- Family tree of Russian monarchs

== Bibliography ==
- Fennell, John (15 November 2023). The Emergence of Moscow, 1304–1359. Univ of California Press. ISBN 978-0-520-34759-5.
- Klug, Ekkehard [in German] (1994). Княжество Тверское (1247–1485 гг.) [Principality of Tver (1247–1485)] (in Russian). ISBN 5-85543-004-9.
