= Canonization (disambiguation) =

Canonization is the process of declaring saints.

Canonization may also refer to:

- Canonization of scripture, introducing a Biblical canon
- A literary canon, such as the Western canon
- "The Canonization", a poem by John Donne
- Another term for canonicalization, the finding a canonical form
- Canonization (fiction), the recognition of fictional works as being part of the official canon
- Graph canonization, the computational problem of finding a canonical form of a given graph

== See also ==
- Canon (disambiguation)
- Decanonization, the exclusion of a saint's name from religious calendars
