= Alexander Mikhailovich =

Alexander Mikhailovich (Russian: Александр Михайлович) may refer to:

- Grand Prince Aleksandr Mikhailovich of Tver (1301 – 1339)
- Grand Duke Alexander Mikhailovich of Russia (1866 – 1933)
