= Vsevolod of Tver =

Prince of Tver from 1346 to 1349

Vsevolod Aleksandrovich
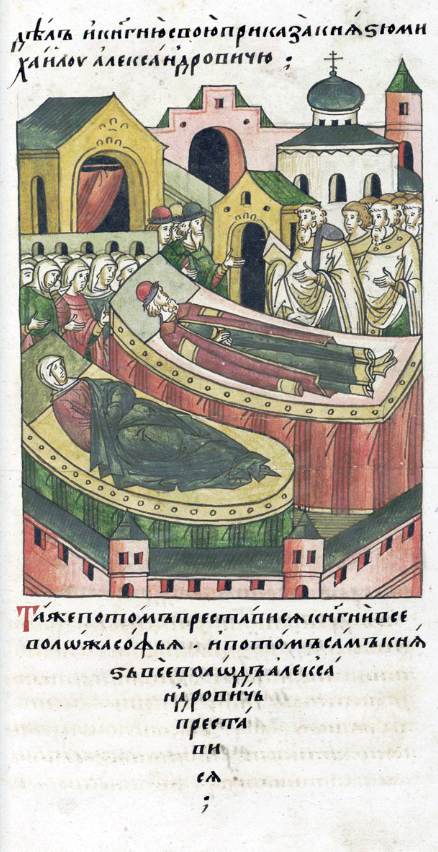
- The death of Vsevolod and Sophia, miniature from the Illustrated Chronicle of Ivan the Terrible (16th century)

Prince of Tver
- Reign: 1346–1349
- Predecessor: Konstantin
- Successor: Vasily
- Born: c. 1328
- Died: 1364
- House: Rurik
- Father: Aleksandr I of Tver

Vsevolod Aleksandrovich (Russian: Всеволод Александрович; c. 1328 – 1364) was Prince of Tver from 1346 to 1349. He was the third son of Aleksandr I of Tver.

== Early life ==
Vsevolod was the third son of Aleksandr I of Tver by his wife Anastasia. He was born in the city of Pskov around 1328, when his father was there in exile. Vsevolod was given Kholm as an appanage shortly before his father and elder brother Fyodor were executed at the Horde in 1339. His uncle Konstantin was given the patent for the principality by the khan.

Konstantin began to quarrel with Vsevolod and Anastasia towards the end of his reign. The Nikon Chronicle says: "In that year (1346) there was hostility between Prince Konstantin Mikhaylovich and Princess [A]nastasia (Aleksandr's widow) and Prince Vsevolod Aleksandrovich". Konstantin "began to take the boyars and their servants... by force", but Vsevolod was "unable to tolerate this", according to the chronicle. Konstantin's oppression was so great that Vsevolod fled to Moscow to see Simeon, and they both went to the Horde to file a complaint. Konstantin himself went to Sarai, but died before the trial could begin.

Upon learning of Konstantin's death, Vsevolod's other uncle Vasily went to the Horde to receive the patent for the principality, as he considered himself to be the rightful heir. Knowing that he could not go to the khan and his entourage empty-handed, he sent his tax collectors to his nephew's appanage in advance to collect tribute while Vsevolod was absent. Vsevolod disputed his claim and received the patent for the principality from Jani Beg, and on the way back, he intercepted Vasily at the town of Bezdezh and "robbed him", leaving him empty-handed and forcing him to return to his patrimony of Kashin. Vsevolod returned to Tver with a Tatar posol (ambassador) and likely a Tatar army.

== Reign ==
Vsevolod received the backing of Simeon, who married his sister in 1347, but Theognostus, the head of the Russian Orthodox Church, disapproved of this and initially refused to give them his blessing. The feud between Vsevolod and Vasily continued, leading to internecine fighting and civil strife, as evidenced by what the Nikon Chronicle says: "The Tverites suffered sorely and many of them scattered abroad because of this derangement (nestroeniyd)". It is also possible that Jani Beg once again confirmed his decision by sending Vsevolod back to Tver with the yarlyk (patent) in 1348.

In 1349, Vsevolod surrendered the throne. The Nikon Chronicle says that Feodor, the bishop of Tver, convinced Vsevolod and Vasily to make peace and to amicably discuss the dynastic issue. Both parties signed a treaty and the throne was given to Vasily, without any resistance from Vsevolod, who then retired to his appanage while Vasily moved into the capital. The chronicle says: "Vasily Mikhaylovich... began to live with his nephew... in peace and great love. And people came from all around to their cities, to their districts and to the land of Tver', and the people multiplied and rejoiced with great rejoicing".

The Nikon Chronicle, which is the only source of information about the feud, stresses the role of Feodor in resolving the crisis, who can be assumed to be acting in the interests of the metropolitan and the grand prince, according to John L. I. Fennell. Fennell also says that at this point, "Feognost and Semen had made up their quarrel, and Semen, to recompense Feognost for his willingness to tolerate his third marriage and for his ecclesiastical victory... was prepared to remove his support for the Aleksandrovichi as quickly as he had first given it". Ekkehard Klug disagrees with Fennell's view and says that the bishop of Tver was not simply acting in their interests, as relations between Vsevolod and Moscow had been growing increasingly close and the Muscovites had no reason to support Vasily without cause.

== Later life ==
Vsevolod was not allowed to join the other Russian princes who went to the Horde to congratulate the new khan in 1357, and he was stopped on his way at Pereyaslavl by the governors of Ivan II of Moscow. Vsevolod again went to Sarai in an attempt to contest his uncle's title, but the khan arrested him "without judgement" and he was given to Vasily when he returned to Tver, who then had Vsevolod and his retinue ransomed for a large sum by the "black people" of Kholm.

After the troops of Tver and Mozhaysk recaptured Rzhev from the Lithuanians in 1358–1359, Vsevolod left for Lithuania to strengthen ties with his brother-in-law, Grand Duke Algirdas. Vasily sent two ambassadors to the khan and Berdi Beg ordered for Vsevolod to be handed over to his uncle "without trial". In 1359–1360, Vsevolod once again fled to Lithuania, and in 1360–1361, the newly appointed metropolitan of Lithuania, Roman, visited Tver but was unable to win the sympathy of the local bishop, Feodor. Roman was escorted to Lithuania "with honor" and Vasily was pressured to give Vsevolod a third of his patrimony. Vsevolod and his wife later died during a plague epidemic that ravaged Tver.

== See also ==
- Family tree of Russian monarchs

== Bibliography ==
- Fennell, John (15 November 2023). The Emergence of Moscow, 1304–1359. Univ of California Press. ISBN 978-0-520-34759-5.
- Klug, Ekkehard [in German] (1994). Княжество Тверское (1247–1485 гг.) [Principality of Tver (1247–1485)] (in Russian). ISBN 5-85543-004-9.
