= Dmitry of Tver =

Prince of Tver from 1318 to 1326

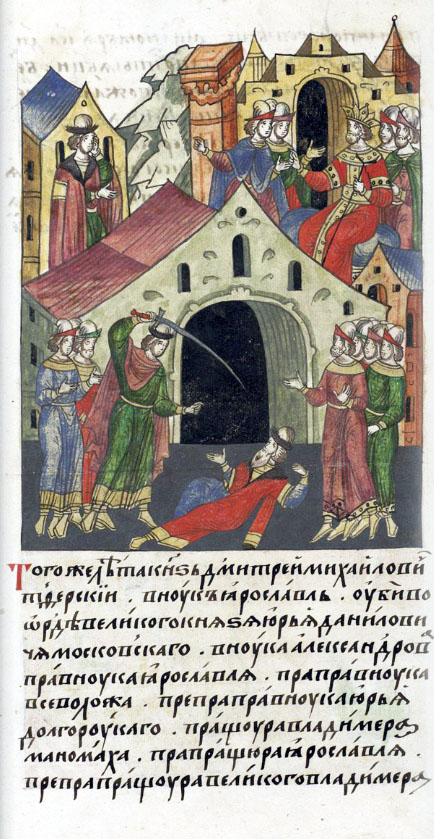
- Dmitri avenging the death of his father in the palace of Özbeg Khan by killing Yury, miniature from the Illustrated Chronicle of Ivan the Terrible (16th century)

Grand Prince of Vladimir
- Reign: 1322–1326
- Predecessor: Yury of Moscow
- Successor: Aleksandr of Tver

Prince of Tver
- Reign: 1318–1326
- Predecessor: Mikhail I
- Successor: Aleksandr I
- Born: 15 September 1298; Tver
- Died: 15 September 1326 (aged 28); Sarai
- Burial: Tver
- House: Rurik
- Father: Mikhail of Tver
- Mother: Anna of Kashin
- Religion: Russian Orthodox

Dmitry Mikhailovich (Russian: Дмитрий Михайлович; 15 September 1298 – 15 September 1326), nicknamed the Fearsome Eyes or the Terrible Eyes (Russian: Грозные Очи), was Prince of Tver from 1318 and Grand Prince of Vladimir from 1322 until his death in 1326.

Following the death of his father, Mikhail, he inherited the Principality of Tver and continued the struggle with the princes of Moscow for control of the Grand Principality of Vladimir and, by extension, supremacy within the Russian lands.

He received the grand princely title from the khan of the Golden Horde after Yury of Moscow chose to defend the borders of the Novgorod Republic instead of directly proceeding to the khan with tributary payments. Four years later, he was executed in Sarai by the Mongols for murdering Yury. The thrones of Tver and Vladimir went to his younger brother, Alexander.

== Early life ==
Dmitry Mikhailovich was born on 15 September 1298 in Tver. He was the eldest of the four sons of Mikhail of Tver by marriage to Anna of Kashin. Dmitry was tonsured as a monk in 1302, and from an early age, he participated in military campaigns. In 1311, at the age of 12, he marched on Nizhny Novgorod on his father's orders. However, the army only reached Vladimir as the metropolitan opposed the campaign and stated that if Dmitry disobeyed him, "he would not be blessed with the throne in Vladimir".

Dmitry continued his father's struggle with Yury of Moscow for the yarlik (patent) for the throne of the Grand Principality of Vladimir, which was granted by the khan of the Golden Horde. The grand princely title was much desired because it was considered the most prestigious among the Russian princes. This struggle began in 1304, following the death of Andrey of Gorodets, as the princes of Moscow and Tver sought leadership within the Russian lands.

Yury of Moscow received the grand princely title from Özbeg Khan, and following a battle between the armies of Moscow and Tver in 1318, Mikhail agreed not to reclaim the grand princely title. The decision ultimately went to Özbeg, who threw his support behind Moscow to maintain the balance of power. Mikhail's enemies also prepared a case against him, and the same year, he was sentenced to death for withholding tributary payments, resisting Özbeg's authority, and killing his sister, who was married to Yury and died in captivity.

== Reign ==
Relations between Moscow and Tver soon improved, and in the winter of 1318–1319, Yury returned to Moscow with the bodies of Mikhail and his son. A treaty was concluded on 30 June 1319 and the bodies were returned to Tver. The khan sought to weaken relations between the two principalities, and in 1321, a representative of the khan arrived in Kashin to collect overdue taxes, which caused "much distress in Kashin", according to a chronicler. Yury was instructed to march on Tver again and the two forces met on the Volga, but a battle was narrowly avoided thanks to the mediation of the bishop of Tver. Dmitry agreed not to reclaim the grand princely throne and handed over 2,000 rubles to the grand prince that were owed to the khan.

Instead of proceeding directly to the khan with the tributary payments, Yury decided to lead the defence of the borders of the Novgorod Republic in his capacity as prince of Novgorod during a war with Swedish forces. The chroniclers of Tver state: "In that winter (1321, after the treaty with Dmitry) Prince Yury, having taken the tribute money from the Mikhaylovichi [which he had received] according to the treaty, did not go to meet the khan's envoy (i.e. to hand it over), but went with the money to Novgorod." However, the chronicles of Moscow and Novgorod make no mention of Yury's refusal to meet the khan's envoy, with the latter stating that Yury was "summoned".

As Yury was preoccupied with the affairs of Novgorod, Dmitry took advantage of this situation and went to khan in Sarai in 1322, likely with details of Yury's misconduct, and was given the grand princely title. Dmitry was given a "powerful envoy" to seat him on the throne and returned in the autumn or winter of 1322. Yury responded to a summons from the khan and proceeded to Sarai with his treasury, but Dmitry's younger brother Alexander ambushed him near Rzhev and relieved him of his possessions. Yury escaped to Pskov, but was soon asked to leave by the Novgorodians as Pskov had requested Lithuanian assistance in its war with the Livonians and consequently, Novgorod and Pskov were technically in a state of war due to this violating a treaty.

Yury finally arrived at Sarai in 1325 to face the consequences; however, Dmitry waited for him there and murdered him to avenge his father. Dmitry was immediately arrested, and the following year, Özbeg Khan ordered his execution. The execution took place on 15 September 1326. It is not known why the khan waited a year for the execution, with the chronicles not providing any useful information on this. Dmitry's younger brother Alexander inherited the throne of Tver but was also granted the grand princely throne by the khan, for reasons unknown. Dmitry was suspected of Lithuanian leanings and the Nikon Chronicle mentions Özbeg's "anger with all the princes of Tver". According to the historian John I. L. Fennell: "Perhaps Uzbek's real aim was to give Aleksandr sufficient rope to hang himself, to put him in a position in which there was no alternative but to compromise himself and thus bring about the destruction of Tver".

Yury's remains were returned to Moscow and buried by the bishops of the Russian Orthodox Church headed by Metropolitan Peter. Dmitry left no descendants, although the Nikon Chronicle mentions a son named Fyodor.

== Sources ==
- "Димитрий Михайлович" . Brockhaus and Efron Encyclopedic Dictionary (in Russian). 1906.
- Boguslavsky, Vladimir V.; Kuksina, Elena I. (2001). "Дмитрий Михайлович Грозные Очи". Славянская энциклопедия. Киевская Русь — Московия. Т. 1: А–М (in Russian). Moskva: ОЛМА Медиа Групп. p. 360. ISBN 9785224022502.
- Crummey, Robert O. (6 June 2014) [1987]. The Formation of Muscovy 1300–1613. Routledge. ISBN 978-1-317-87200-9.
- Fennell, John L. I. (15 November 2023) [1968]. The Emergence of Moscow, 1304–1359. University of California Press. ISBN 978-0-520-34759-5.

Regnal titles
Preceded by Yury	Grand Prince of Vladimir; 1322–1326	Succeeded by Alexander I
Preceded by Mikhail Yaroslavich	Prince of Tver; 1318–1326	Succeeded by Alexander I
