= Xenia of Tarusa =

- Grand Princess consort of Vladimir; Princess consort of Tver
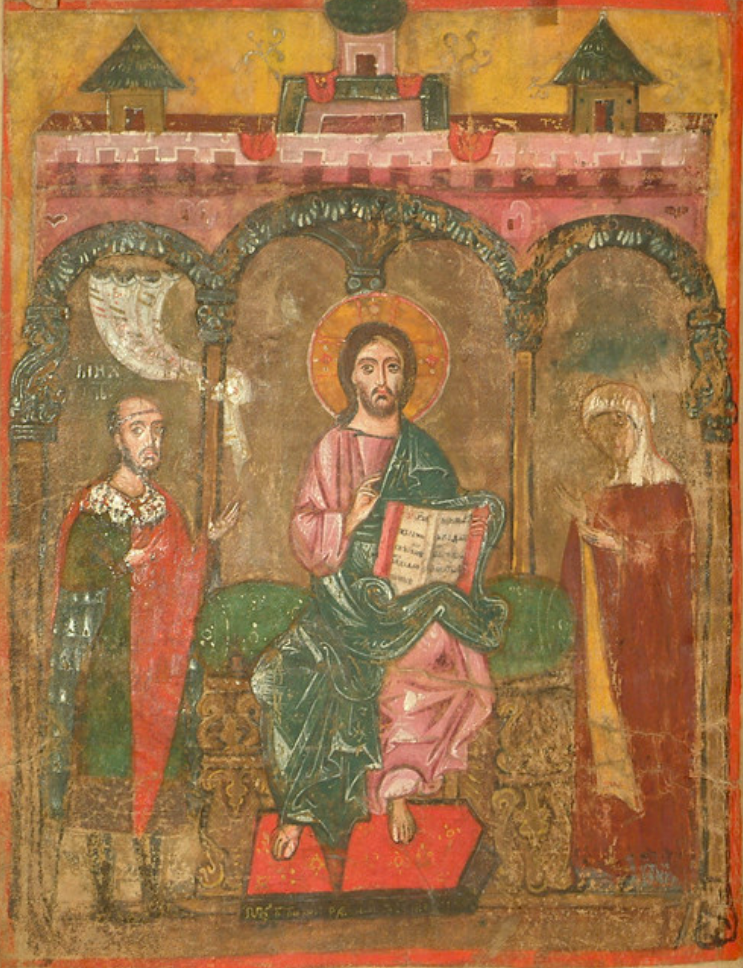
- Mikhail and his mother Xenia standing before Christ, early 14th century miniature
- Born: c. 1246
- Died: 1312 (aged 65–66)
- Spouse: Yaroslav III of Tver
- Issue: Mikhail of Tver
- Dynasty: Rurikids
- Father: Yury Mikhailovich, the prince of Tarusa

Xenia Yuryevna (also spelled Kseniya or Ksenia; Russian: Ксения Юрьевна; c. 1246 – 1312) was the princess consort of Tver and grand princess consort of Vladimir from 1265 to 1271. She is counted among the saints of the Russian Orthodox Church.

== Life ==
Xenia of Tarusa was a daughter of Yury Mikhailovich, the prince of Tarusa.

She married Yaroslav Yaroslavich of Tver in 1265. During her marriage and the reign of her husband she was unusually influential in the affairs of the state and remained so even after Yaroslav's death in 1271. Soon after she retired to the women's monastery in Novgorod, yet continued to play an influential role in the affairs of the principality. She died in 1312 as a nun and was buried in the Transfiguration Cathedral she founded.

== Canonization ==
Soon after her death she was canonized locally, and again in 1988.

She is revered in the Diocese of Tver: Her memorial day is on the first Sunday after June 29.
