= Konstantin of Tver =

Prince of Tver (r. 1327–1338; 1339–1345)

Konstantin Mikhailovich
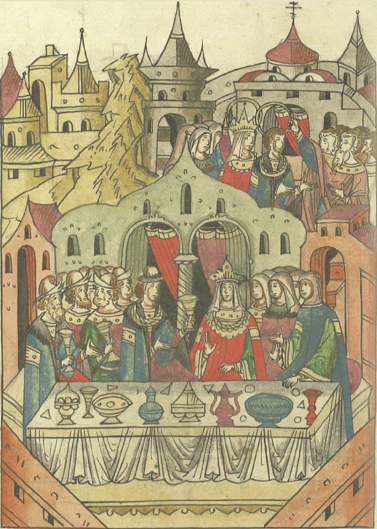
- The marriage of Konstantin, miniature from the Illustrated Chronicle of Ivan the Terrible (16th century)

Prince of Tver
- Reign: 1327–1338
- Predecessor: Aleksandr
- Successor: Aleksandr
- Reign: 1339–1346
- Predecessor: Aleksandr
- Successor: Vsevolod
- Born: 1306
- Died: 1346 (aged 39–40)
- House: Rurik
- Father: Mikhail of Tver
- Mother: Anna of Kashin

Konstantin Mikhailovich (Russian: Константин Михайлович; 1306–1346) was Prince of Tver from 1327 to 1338 and again from 1339 until his death in 1346. He was the third son of Mikhail of Tver and the founder of the branch of Rurikid princes later called Dorogobuzh.

He succeeded his brother Aleksandr as prince after a failed popular uprising against the Tatars. During his reign, Konstantin was a loyal servant of Ivan I of Moscow, the uncle of his wife Sophia.

== Life ==
Konstantin was born in 1306 and was the third son of Mikhail of Tver. After his father was executed by the Mongols in 1318, he was held captive in Sarai. He was ransomed for 2,000 rubles and in 1320, he married Sophia, the daughter of Yury of Moscow.

After a popular uprising against the Tatars in 1327, his brother Aleksandr fled. Konstantin and his younger brother Vasily went to Ladoga, but they did not stay there for long and returned to Tver after it had been devastated, where at first "they sat in great poverty and misery, for the land of Tver was empty". Afterwards, they "bit by bit began gathering people and consoling them from great sorrow and grief". In 1328, Konstantin went to Sarai and received the yarlyk for the principality from the khan.

During his reign, both Konstantin and his brother Vasily were loyal servants of Ivan I of Moscow. He quietly ruled his principality under the close supervision of Ivan. Konstantin also accompanied Ivan on his trips to the Horde and helped him with his military campaigns. His passivity went beyond simple submission, as when the Russian princes led by Ivan urged Aleksandr to go the Horde while he sought sanctuary in Pskov, Konstantin joined them.

Aleksandr was later reinstated as prince and returned to Tver in 1338, but was executed the following year. After his death, Konstantin continued to rule the principality even after Ivan transferred the bell from the Transfiguration Cathedral to Moscow. After Ivan died in 1340, Konstantin accompanied Ivan's son Simeon when he went to the Horde to receive the yarlyk for the grand principality, and the khan formalized this dependency by placing Konstantin and other princes "under his hand".

Towards the end of Konstantin's reign, there was hostility with Anastasia and Vsevolod, the widow and the son of his brother Aleksandr. Konstantin "began to take their boyars and their servants... by force", but Vsevolod was "unable to tolerate this", according to the chronicle. Vsevolod fled to Moscow to see Simeon, and they then went to the Horde with a complaint. Konstantin went there for the trial but died before it could begin, in 1346. Following his death, the throne went to Vsevolod.

== Family ==
Konstantin married twice: Sophia, the daughter of Yury of Moscow, and Yevdokiya, whose origin is unknown. He had two sons, likely from his second marriage:

- Yeremey (died 1372), prince of Dorogobuzh;
- Semyon (died 1364), prince of Dorogobuzh.

== See also ==
- Family tree of Russian monarchs

== Bibliography ==
- Fennell, John (15 November 2023). The Emergence of Moscow, 1304–1359. Univ of California Press. ISBN 978-0-520-34759-5.
- Klug, Ekkehard [in German] (1994). Княжество Тверское (1247–1485 гг.) [Principality of Tver (1247–1485)] (in Russian). ISBN 5-85543-004-9.
