= Prince of Tver =

Monarch during a period of Russian history

The Prince of Tver (Russian: Князь тверской) was the ruler of the Principality of Tver. The princes of Tver descended from the first prince, Yaroslav Yaroslavich (r. 1247–1271). They are also known as the "Iaroslavichi" or "Yaroslavichi of Tver", or the "Mikhailovichi of Tver". In 1485, Tver was formally annexed by Moscow and became an appanage.

== History ==
Following the Mongol invasions, Tver became an independent principality in 1247 with Yaroslav Yaroslavich, the son of Yaroslav II of Vladimir, becoming the first prince of Tver. During the 14th century, Tver competed with Moscow for dominance until it declined and was finally annexed by Moscow in 1485 under Ivan III. Tver was given to his son Ivan the Young as an appanage.

== List of princes ==
Name	Lifespan	Reign start	Reign end	Notes	Family	Image
Yaroslav Yaroslavich: Ярослав Ярославич	1230–1272	1247	16 September 1272	Son of Yaroslav II of Vladimir. Grand Prince of Vladimir since 1264	Rurik	
Svyatoslav Yaroslavich: Святослав Ярославич	?–1285	1272	1282/1285	Son of Yaroslav Yaroslavich	Rurik	
Saint Mikhail I Yaroslavich: Михаил Ярославич	1272–1318	1286	1318	Son of Yaroslav Yaroslavich, younger brother of Svyatoslav. Grand Prince of Vladimir since 1305. Executed by Mongols	Rurik	
Dmitry Mikhailovich: the Fearsome Eyes; Дмитрий Михайлович Грозные Очи	1299–1326	1318	1326	Son of Mikhail I. Grand Prince of Vladimir since 1322. Executed by Mongols in response to the murder of Yury of Moscow	Rurik	
Alexander I Mikhailovich: Александр Михайлович	1301–1339	1326	1327	Son of Mikhail I, younger brother of Dmitry. Also Grand Prince of Vladimir. Forced into exile in Pskov after anti-Mongol uprising in Tver	Rurik	
Konstantin Mikhailovich: Константин Михайлович	1306–1345	1327	1338	Son of Mikhail I, younger brother of Dmitry and Alexander I	Rurik	
Alexander I Mikhailovich: Александр Михайлович	1301–1339	1338	1339	Restored. Executed by Mongols	Rurik	
Konstantin Mikhailovich: Константин Михайлович	1306–1345	1339	1345	Restored	Rurik	
Vsevolod Alexandrovich: Всеволод Александрович	~1328–1364	1346	1349	Son of Alexander I. Prince of Kholm; Abdicated	Rurik	
Vasily Mikhailovich: Василий Михайлович	~1304–1368	1349	1368	Son of Mikhail I, younger brother of Dmitry, Alexander I and Konstantin; Prince of Kashin	Rurik	
Mikhail II Alexandrovich: Михаил Александрович	1333–1399	1368	1399	Son of Alexander I Grand Prince since 1382	Rurik	
Ivan Mikhailovich: Иван Михайлович	1357–1425	1399	1425	Son of Mikhail II; Died of plague	Rurik	
Alexander II Ivanovich: Александр Иванович	~1379–1425	22 May 1425	25 October 1425	Son of Ivan; Died of plague	Rurik	
Yuri Alexandrovich: Юрий Александрович	~1400–1425	25 October 1425	26 November 1425	Son of Alexander II; Died of plague	Rurik	
Boris Alexandrovich: Борис Александрович	~1399–1461	26 November 1425	10 February 1461	Son of Alexander II, younger brother of Yuri	Rurik	
Mikhail III Borisovich: Михаил Борисович	1453–1505	1461	1485	Son of Boris; Forced into exile after brief war with Ivan III of Moscow whose goal was to reunite Russian principalities under a single authority.	Rurik	

In 1485, Ivan III conquered Tver, and until 1490, his son Ivan the Young governed the duchy.

== See also ==
- List of Russian monarchs

== See also ==
- Of Tver

== Bibliography ==
- Fennell, John (23 September 2022). The Emergence of Moscow, 1304-1359. University of California Press. p. 352. ISBN 978-0-520-37358-7.
- Isoaho, Mari (2006). The Image of Aleksandr Nevskiy in Medieval Russia: Warrior and Saint. Leiden: Brill. p. 417. ISBN 9789047409496.
- Martin, Janet (2007). Medieval Russia: 980–1584. Second Edition. E-book. Cambridge: Cambridge University Press. ISBN 978-0-511-36800-4.
- Raffensperger, Christian; Ostrowski, Donald (2023). The Ruling Families of Rus: Clan, Family and Kingdom. London: Reaktion Books. p. 309. ISBN 978-1-78914-745-2. (e-book)
