= Decanonization =

Exclusion of a saint's name from religious calendars

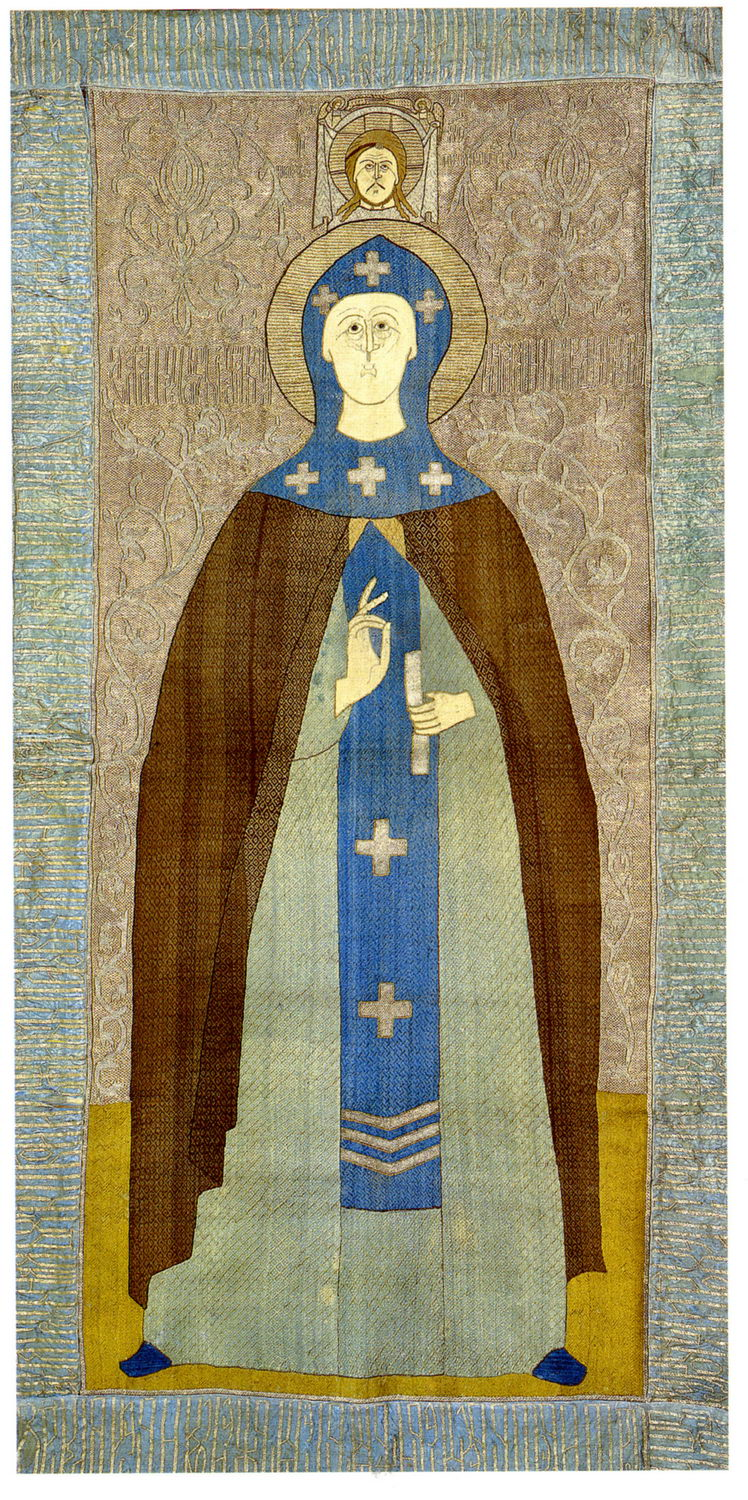
Icon of Anna of Kashin (mid-17th century), decanonized in 1677–1678 and re-canonized in 1909

Decanonization or de-canonization (prefix de- ← Latin: de preposition: down, from, away + Latin: canonizatio ← Greek: κανών – list, catalog) is the exclusion of a person's name from a list or catalog of saints; it is the opposite of canonization. Decanonization, the exclusion of a saint's name from the church calendar, was carried out in the Russian Orthodox Church, in the Catholic Church and in the Anglican Church.

== Orthodox Church ==
In the Russian Orthodox Church, the most famous case is the decanonization of the Right-Believing princess Anna of Kashin at the Great Moscow Synod in 1677–1678. The reason for the decanonization was the religious policy of the forcible introduction in Russia of the three fingers sign of the cross, instead of the older two fingers variant. The reforms that began under Alexis Mikhailovich and continued under Peter I and his followers demanded a political and ecclesiastical separation from the previous tradition and national culture, which included the decanonization of persons whose literary or hagiographic works contradicted the new religious policy. The veneration of the famous ecclesiastical writer and translator Maximus the Greek was suspended. Memorial days associated with 21 Russian saints were removed from the Typikon of 1682. During the reign of Peter I, the veneration of the martyrs Anthony, John, and Eustathius, who wore beards and suffered under a clean-shaven pagan knyaz, was stopped. After 1721 the number of new canonizations sharply decreased (only 2 new saints were canonized). In the 18th century there was a decanonization of a number of locally revered saints. However, in the 19th century, church veneration of many locally venerated saints was restored. Hegumen Andronik (Trubachev) believes that the most pernicious were not specific decanonizations, but the very admission of decanonization into church life as a possible norm, a rule implemented due to a change in church policy.

In the 20th century, some of the names of previously decanonized saints were returned to the church calendar. The re-canonization of Anna of Kashin took place in the Russian Orthodox Church in 1909. However, most of the ancient Russian ascetics, whose veneration was terminated during the "struggle against Raskol", remained forgotten.

In 2013, 36 saints, New Martyrs who suffered from repression during the Soviet era, were decanonized. Their names were removed from the 2013 Russian Orthodox Church calendar without explanation.

== Catholic Church ==
There are several examples of decanonization in the Catholic Church throughout the centuries. Among the saints decanonized were Kakwykylla, Wilgefortis, Werner, Liban and a host of others deemed to be legendary figures with no historical veracity. The official position of the church is that persons may still maintain private devotions to these saints, however they are forbidden from public veneration as there is no sufficient evidence for their existence.

On February 14, 1969, Pope Paul VI, through the apostolic letter Mysterii Paschalis, removed the names of a number of saints from the General Roman Calendar, based on a lack of documentary evidence of their lives. These included popes Telesphorus, Hyginus, Lucius I, Anicetus, Soter, Caius, Cletus, Eleutherius, Felix I, Victor I and Zephyrinus, as well as saints Dorothy, Maris, Martha, Abachum and Audifax, Faustinus and Jovita, Basilides, Cyrinus, Nabor and Nazarius, Tryphon, Respicius, and Nympha, Sergius and Bacchus, Apuleius, Placid and Companions, Eustace and Companions, Cyprian and Justina, Boniface of Tarsus, Marcellus, Alexius, Symphorosa, the Forty Martyrs of Sebaste, the Seven Holy Brothers, Margaret of Antioch, Catherine of Alexandria, Barbara, and Ursula.

Pope Paul VI also removed Simon of Trent from the Roman Martyrology in 1965.

== Anglican Church ==
On 16 November 1538 Henry VIII issued a proclamation declaring that all images and pictures of Thomas Becket were to be "put down," and all mention of him in calendar and service book to be erased.

In 1966, the Anglican Church excluded Little Saint Hugh of Lincoln from the books of locally revered saints.

In 1859 after Parliament passed the Anniversary Days Observance Act, the commemoration of Charles I (known in the calendar as "Charles, King and Martyr, 1649") was removed, effectively decanonizing Charles.

== Challenging the possibility of decanonization ==
There are members of the clergy and other people in both the Orthodox and Catholic Churches who consider the term "decanonization" to be incorrect. They reject the very possibility of decanonization, regarding canonization as an infallible act that cannot be corrected. They believe that all canonized saints existed, went to Heaven, and remain in Heaven.
