= Mikhail of Tver =

Prince of Tver from 1285 to 1318

Mikhail Yaroslavich of Tver
- Grand Prince of Vladimir; Prince of Tver
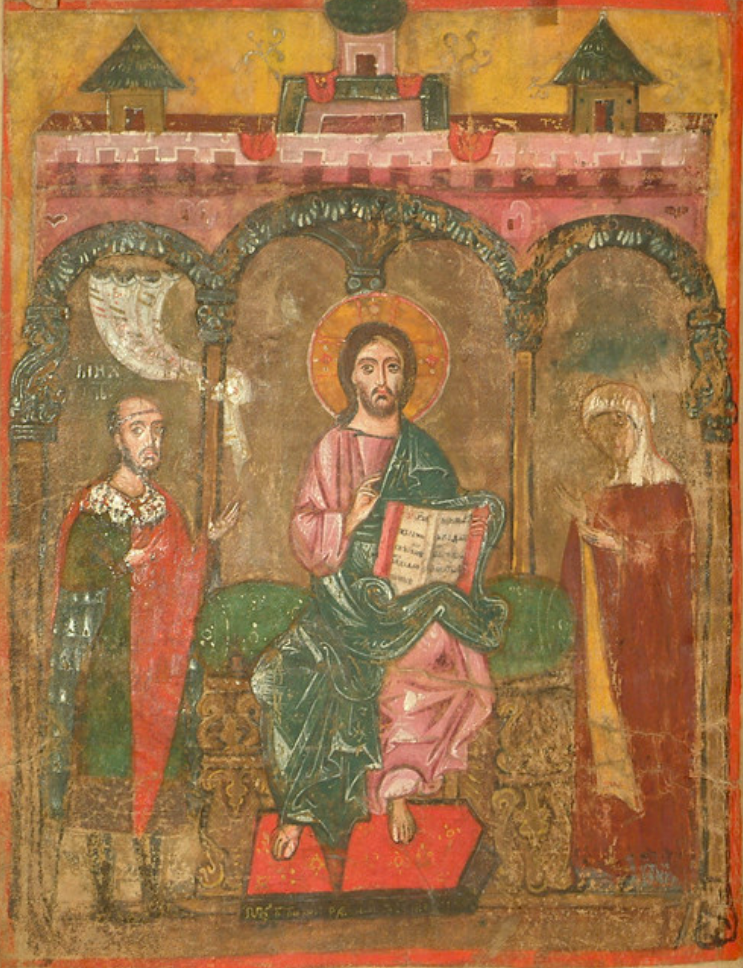
- Mikhail and his mother Xenia standing before Christ, early 14th century miniature
- Born: 1271
- Died: 22 November 1318 (aged 46–47); Sarai
- Spouse: Anna of Kashin
- Issue more...: Dmitry of Tver; Alexander of Tver; Konstantin of Tver; Vasily of Kashin
- House: Rurik
- Father: Yaroslav III
- Mother: Xenia of Tarusa

Mikhail (Note: Also anglicized as Michael.) Yaroslavich (Russian: Михаил Ярославич; 1271 – 22 November 1318) was Prince of Tver from 1285 and Grand Prince of Vladimir from 1304 to 1314 and again from 1315 until his death in 1318. He was canonized and counted among the saints of the Russian Orthodox Church.

Mikhail Yaroslavich was the second son of Yaroslav III Yaroslavich of Tver, the younger brother of Aleksandr Nevsky; he succeeded his elder brother Yaroslav as the prince of Tver in 1285. His mother Xenia was the second spouse to Yaroslav III and is known as the saint Xenia of Tarusa. Upon the death of Andrei Aleksandrovich, Aleksandr Nevsky's son and Yaroslav's nephew, Mikhail became the grand prince of Vladimir in 1304, as was consistent with traditional succession practices. He was confirmed in office by Tokhta, the khan of the Golden Horde.

== Reign ==
=== Troubles as grand prince and rivalry with Moscow ===
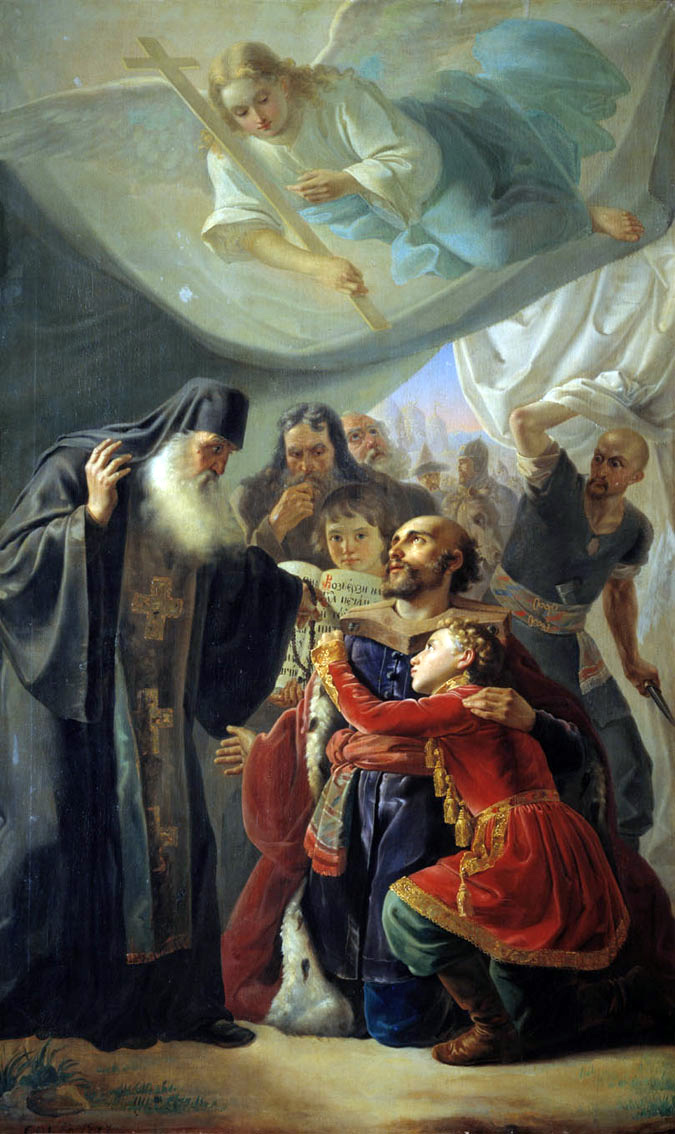
Parting words of Grand Prince Mikhail by Pimen Orlov (1847)

While he seemed secure in the throne, being the legitimate heir and having been confirmed by the khan in Sarai, Grand Prince Mikhail suffered a series of setbacks as grand prince which led to him losing the grand princely office for both himself and, in some ways, ultimately for his descendants. He was, like most Grand Princes of Vladimir, accepted as Prince of Novgorod the Great in 1309, but fought with Novgorod, going so far as to withdraw his lieutenants (namestniki) and cut off grain shipments into the city in 1312.

While he was on decent terms with Tokhta Khan, and initially with his successor, Uzbeg Khan (Mikhail paid homage on Uzbeg's accession to the throne in 1313 and remained in Sarai until 1315), he eventually lost influence to Yury of Moscow, who gained influence in Novgorod while the grand prince was away in Sarai. Mikhail did manage to finally take control of the city in 1316 with Mongol aid, but the following year Uzbeg Khan gave the yarlik or patent of office of the Grand Prince of Vladimir to Yury, who also married Uzbeg's sister.

After granting Yury the iarlyk or patent of office, the Khan sent his army under the Mongol general Kavgadii to help Yuri in his struggle with Mikhail Yaroslavich. On 22 December 1317 Mikhail defeated Yuri at a village called Bortenevo 40 kilometres (25 mi) from Tver. Mikhail captured Yuri's wife, who was the Khan's sister. When she died in Mikhail's custody, he was blamed for her death, although it seems unlikely that he would have killed her knowing how much it would hurt him politically for such little gain. He released Kavgadii, who returned to Sarai and accused Mikhail of murdering the Khan's sister, withholding tribute, and warring against his Mongol overlord. As a result, Mikhail was summoned to the Horde by the Khan and executed on 22 November 1318.

=== Relations with the Church ===
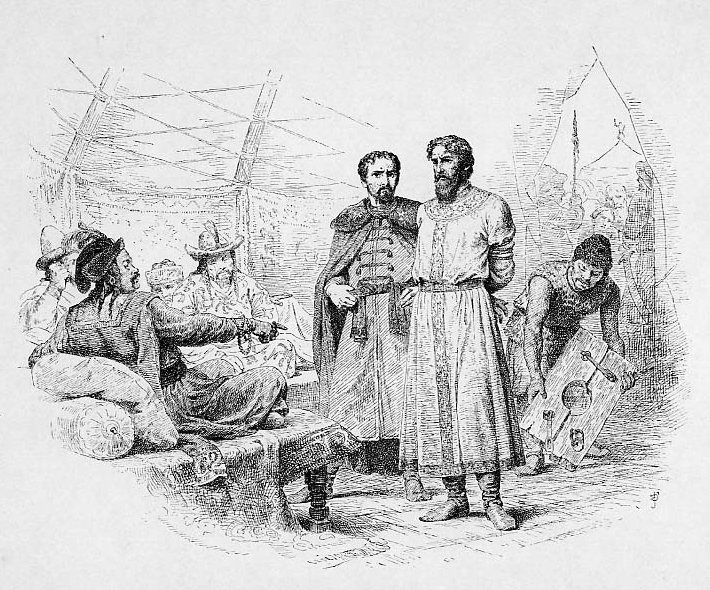
Mikhail Yaroslavich before the Mongol khan by Vasili Vereshchagin (1896)

Mikhail also alienated the Church, particularly Metropolitan Petr (ruled 1308–1326). When Metropolitan Maksim died in 1305, Mikhail nominated another candidate, but Petr was consecrated by the Patriarch of Constantinople. Petr sided with Moscow and opposed Mikhail on several occasions. In 1309, he appointed David as Archbishop of Novgorod and David was instrumental in the argument that led Mikhail to withdraw his lieutenants and cut the grain supplies to the city. In 1314, Novgorod called on Yury to be named grand prince and for Mikhail to be deposed. Thus the support of the Church aided Yury to Mikhail's detriment. Despite his having been unfavored by the Russian Orthodox Church during his lifetime, the Church later declared Mikhail a saint because of his piousness during his summons by the Khan which he knew was to certain death and because his relics, when transported to his hometown, were discovered to be incorrupt.

== Family and children ==
In 1294 Mikhail married Princess Anna of Rostov, daughter of Dimitry of Rostov. They had five children:

1. Prince Dmitry of Tver (1299–1326);
2. Prince Alexander of Tver (1301–1339);
3. Prince Konstantin of Tver (1306–1346);
4. Prince Vasily of Kashin (d. after 1368);
5. Feodora of Tver.

Mikhail's sons and successors Dmitry the Terrible Eyes and Alexander were both also loved in the Horde, as was Alexander's elder son, Mikhail. Both Aleksandr Mikhailovich, and Mikhail Aleksandrovich briefly held the Grand Princely office (in 1326–1327 and 1371–1372 respectively) but Mikhail's failure to defeat Yury of Moscow, followed by Aleksandr's role (real or perceived) in the Tver Uprising of 1327, led the Tver branch to lose the favor of the Khans, and the Danilovich - the Muscovite princes, held the title for all but two years after 1317.

Mikhail's wife took the veil in Kashin's nunnery and died there on 2 October 1368. She is commemorated as Anna of Kashin by the Russian Orthodox Church and was canonized in 1677.

Yurievichi connection of Moscow, Novgorod-Suzdal, and Tver

Yaroslav II of Vladimir; G. P. of Vladimir (1238–1246); Grandson of Yurievichi progenitor Yuri Dolgorukiy
Alexander Nevsky; Prince of Novgorod (~1246~1259); G. P. of Vladimir (1252–1263)	Andrey II of Vladimir; Prince of Suzdal (1256–1264); G. P. of Vladimir (1249–1252)	Yaroslav of Tver; Prince of Tver (1247–1271); G. P. of Vladimir (1263–1271)
Daniel of Moscow; Prince of Moscow (1283–1303); Daniilovichi progenitor	Konstantin of Suzdal; Prince of Nizhny; Novgorod-Suzdal (1341–1355)	Mikhail of Tver; Prince of Tver (1285–1318); G. P. of Vladimir (1304–1318)

== See also ==
- Family tree of Russian monarchs

== Notes ==
Regnal titles
Preceded by Andrey	Grand Prince of Vladimir; 1304–1318	Succeeded by Yury of Moscow
Preceded by Svyatoslav	Prince of Tver; 1285–1318	Succeeded by Dmitry
