= Aleksandr of Tver =

Prince of Tver (r. 1326–1327; 1338–1339)

Aleksandr Mikhailovich
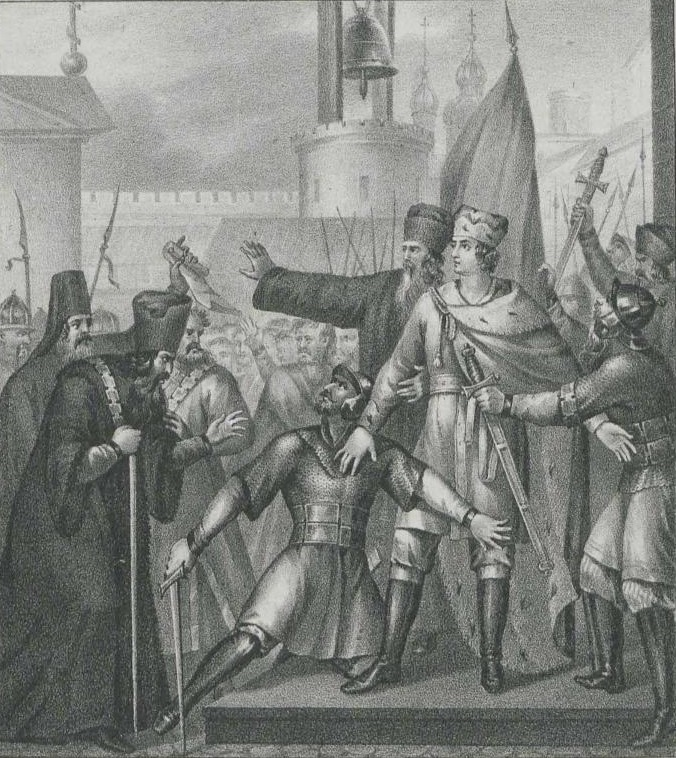
- Prince Aleksandr of Tver in Pskov, engraving by Boris Chorikov (1836)

Prince of Tver
- Reign: 1326–1327
- Predecessor: Dmitry
- Successor: Konstantin

Grand Prince of Vladimir
- Reign: 1326–1327
- Predecessor: Dmitry of Tver
- Successor: Aleksandr of Suzdal

Grand Prince of Tver
- Reign: 1338–1339
- Predecessor: Konstantin
- Successor: Konstantin
- Born: 7 October 1301; Tver
- Died: 29 October 1339; Sarai
- Spouse: Anastasia
- Issue more...: Mikhail II of Tver; Uliana of Tver
- House: Rurik
- Father: Mikhail of Tver
- Mother: Anna of Kashin

Aleksandr (Note: Also anglicized as Alexander.) Mikhailovich (Russian: Александр Михайлович; 7 October 1301 – 28 October 1339) was Prince of Tver and Grand Prince of Vladimir from 1326 to 1327 and Grand Prince of Tver from 1338 until his death in 1339.

His reign was marked by a failed popular uprising against the Tatars, which led to him losing the grand princely throne. After a period of exile, he was reinstated as the prince of Tver before he was executed in Sarai by the Mongols, together with his son Fyodor. His death marked the end of a 35-year-long struggle with the princes of Moscow for the Grand Principality of Vladimir and, by extension, supremacy within the Russian lands.

== Early life ==
Aleksandr was born in 1301. He was the second son of Mikhail of Tver by his wife, Anna of Kashin.

He is first mentioned in 1319, when he went with the boyars (nobles) of Tver to the city of Vladimir to see Yury of Moscow, who was the grand prince of Vladimir at the time. Since Mikhail first became grand prince in 1304, the princes of Moscow and Tver competed for leadership within the Russian lands. Aleksandr went there to conclude peace with Yury and to retrieve the body of his father, who had been executed by the Mongols in 1318. A treaty was signed on 29 June 1319 and Aleksandr and his brother were allowed to return to Tver with the body of their father.

In 1322, he helped his brother Dmitry obtain the yarlyk (patent) for the grand princely throne. Aleksandr had filed a complaint to Özbeg Khan after Yury did not deliver all of the tribute from Tver to the khan. According to the Tverite chronicle: "In that winter (1321, after the treaty with Dmitry) Prince Yury, having taken the tribute money from the Mikhaylovichi [which he had received] according to the treaty, did not go to meet the khan's envoy (i.e. to hand it over), but went with the money to Novgorod". Yury went to the Horde after Özbeg summoned him, but Aleksandr attacked him on his way, taking his possessions and forcing him to flee to Pskov.

Four years later, Aleksandr succeeded his childless brother Dmitry who had been executed at the behest of Özbeg after Dmitry avenged his father's death by murdering Yury. Özbeg appointed Aleksandr as the grand prince. According to John L. I. Fennell, in spite of what the compiler of the Nikon Chronicle calls Özbeg's "anger with all the princes of Tver'", it is possible that Aleksandr was given "sufficient rope to hang himself, to put him in a position in which there was no alternative but to compromise himself and thus bring about the destruction of Tver'".

== Reign ==
=== Tver uprising ===
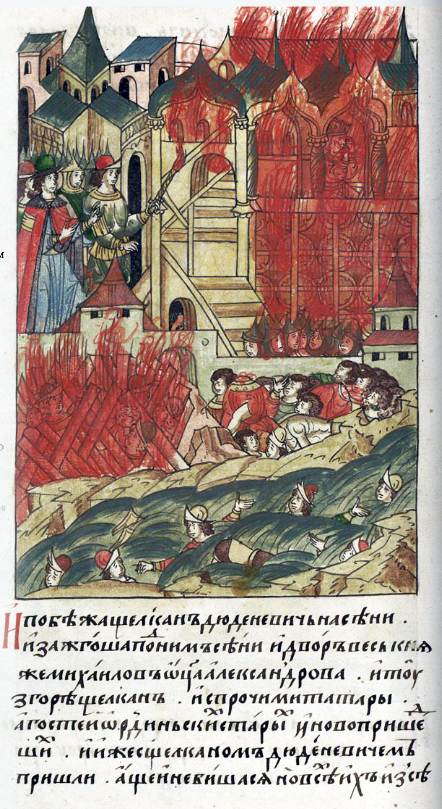
A mob in Tver burning the Khan's cousin Shevkal alive in 1327, miniature from the Illustrated Chronicle of Ivan the Terrible (16th century)

In 1327, a Tatar official and cousin of Özbeg, the baskak Shevkal, arrived in Tver from the Horde, with a large retinue. They took up residence at Aleksandr's palace and, according to chronicle reports, started terrorizing the city, randomly robbing and killing. Rumors spread that Shevkal wanted to kill the prince, occupy the throne for himself and introduce Islam to the city. When, on 15 August 1327, the Tatars tried to take a horse from a deacon named Dyudko, he cried for help and a mob of furious people rushed on the Tatars and killed them all. Shevkal and his remaining guards were burnt alive in one of the houses where they had attempted to hide.

The massacre inevitably led to Tatar reprisals. Indeed, the whole incident may have been a provocation by the Tatars to destroy Aleksandr and the princes of Tver. Özbeg dispatched a punitive force led by Ivan I of Moscow, the brother of Yury, to sack the city. Ivan was given 50,000 Tatar troops and was joined by Aleksandr Vasilyevich of Suzdal. After Novgorod refused to offer him asylum, Aleksandr fled to Pskov. For his role in leading the punitive expedition, Özbeg rewarded Ivan with the title of grand prince and shared the principality between him and Aleksandr of Suzdal. Novgorod and Kostroma went to Ivan, while Vladimir and the Volga district went to Aleksandr of Suzdal.

=== Exile ===
Pskov not only granted Aleksandr sanctuary, but also appointed him to be their prince. Pskov signed an agreement with Aleksandr in which they swore "not to hand him over to the Russian princes". Afterwards, a joint Muscovite–Novgorodian delegation was sent to urge him to go to the Horde, as the ambassadors said that his refusal would lead to the destruction of Pskov by the Horde. Aleksandr initially agreed to go to the Horde and sacrifice himself "for all the Christian people", but he was persuaded by the Pskovites to not leave. According to John L. I. Fennell, it is "hard to conceive of any possible motive behind the Pskovites' show of bravado except the assurance of Lithuanian support".

Ivan moved his troops to the town of Opochka, situated about 100 miles (160 km) from Pskov, but decided against a direct attack on the city. Instead, Theognostos, the metropolitan of the Russian Orthodox Church, excommunicated Aleksandr and the city at the behest of Ivan. Aleksandr is alleged to have said: "O my brothers and friends, let not this curse and excommunication be upon you because of me. I shall leave your city, and your oath to me and my oath to you shall no longer be valid". After receiving assurances from Pskov that his wife would be cared for, Aleksandr left Pskov for Lithuania.

=== Return to Tver ===
Aleksandr returned to Pskov from Lithuania in 1331 or 1332 with the ultimate aim of recovering his principality and the grand principality. In 1334 or early 1335, he sent his son Fyodor to the Horde, who returned to Tver in 1335 with a Tatar official. Aleksandr visited Tver in the winter of 1336, and the chronicles simply state that he brought his son back to Pskov; however, historians have suggested that he may have gone to Tver to make peace with his brother Konstantin or find out the attitude of the population.

Aleksandr prepared a trip to the Horde to discuss his reinstatement as prince, after being persuaded by Ivan that it was safe to do so. Aleksandr made contact with Theognostus and sent his boyars to the metropolitan "for the sake of his blessing and his prayers", as the chronicle says, though it is likely that he sought protection from the Russian Orthodox Church. Although the archbishop of Novgorod had warned him during his visit to not visit Sarai, Aleksandr "refused judgement" and the archbishop left the city "having anathematized Pskov", according to the Novgorodian chronicle.

At Sarai, Aleksandr was granted a full pardon and the right to return to Tver. Some historians have explained Aleksandr's reinstatement as an attempt to set up Tver against Moscow again. However, Fennell says that "the situation closely resembled that of 1326", in which Aleksandr "was permitted to return to Tver' in order that he might discredit himself in the eyes of the Tverites–and indeed of any other Russians who might witness his predicament–and thus ultimately bring about his own destruction". He also says that an immediate execution of Aleksandr would have antagonized Novgorod, Pskov and Lithuania. In the autumn of 1338, Aleksandr returned to Tver and he called for his spouse and children to return from Pskov. Aleksandr was also granted the title of grand prince by Özbeg, although the grand prince of Vladimir continued to be recognized as the senior leader, or the "grand prince over the grand princes".

=== Execution ===
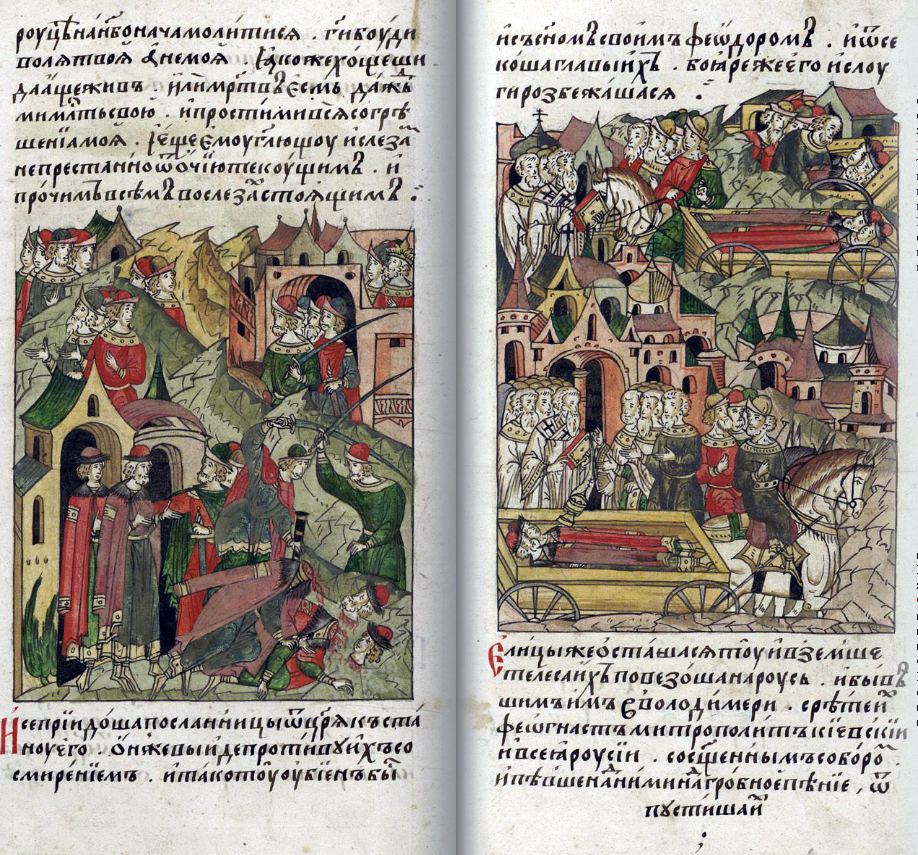
Death and body of Alexander Mikhailovich of Tver, miniature from the Illustrated Chronicle of Ivan the Terrible (16th century)

Aleksandr sent his son Fyodor to Sarai as an envoy, and at the same time, Ivan went to the khan. As a result of accusations made by "lawless people" inspired by "that all-cunning wicked counsellor the devil", according to the chronicle, Özbeg sent an ambassador to Tver, who informed him that Özbeg would allow him to bring back his son. Aleksandr arrived at the Horde at the end of September, and both he and his son were executed on 28 October 1339, by the orders of Özbeg.

The execution of Aleksandr marked the end of a 35-year-long struggle between Moscow and Tver for supremacy and the start of the fragmentation of Tver into appanage principalities (udely). According to Fennell, "If Uzbek had not succeeded in bringing back Pskov into the orbit of the grand prince of Vladimir, he had at least removed from the political scene the most powerful ally of Gedimin in north-east Russia".

== Family ==
Aleksandr was married to Anastasia. He had eight children:

- Fyodor (died 1339);
- Lev (born 1321, date of death unknown);
- Mikhail (1333–1399), prince of Mikulin, married to Evdokia of Suzdal;
- Vsevolod (died 1364), prince of Kholm, married to Sophia of Ryazan;
- Andrey (died 1364);
- Vladimir (died 1364);
- Maria (died 1399), married to Simeon of Moscow;
- Uliana (c. 1325 – 1392), married to Algirdas of Lithuania.

== See also ==
- Family tree of Russian monarchs

== Bibliography ==
- "Александр Михайлович, князь тверской" . Brockhaus and Efron Encyclopedic Dictionary (in Russian). 1906.
- Crummey, Robert O. (6 June 2014) [1987]. The Formation of Muscovy 1300–1613. Routledge. ISBN 978-1-317-87200-9.
- Fennell, John L. I. (15 November 2023) [1968]. The Emergence of Moscow, 1304–1359. University of California Press. ISBN 978-0-520-34759-5.
- Gorsky, Anton A. (2016). Русские земли в XIII-XIV веках: пути политического развития [The Russian lands in the 13th–14th centuries] (in Russian). Наука. ISBN 978-5-02-039659-3.

Regnal titles
Preceded by Dmitry	Grand Prince of Vladimir; 1326–1327	Succeeded by Ivan I of Moscow
Preceded by Dmitry	Prince of Tver; 1326–1327	Succeeded by Konstantin
Preceded by Konstantin	Grand Prince of Tver; 1338–1339	Succeeded by Konstantin
