= Diocese of Tver =

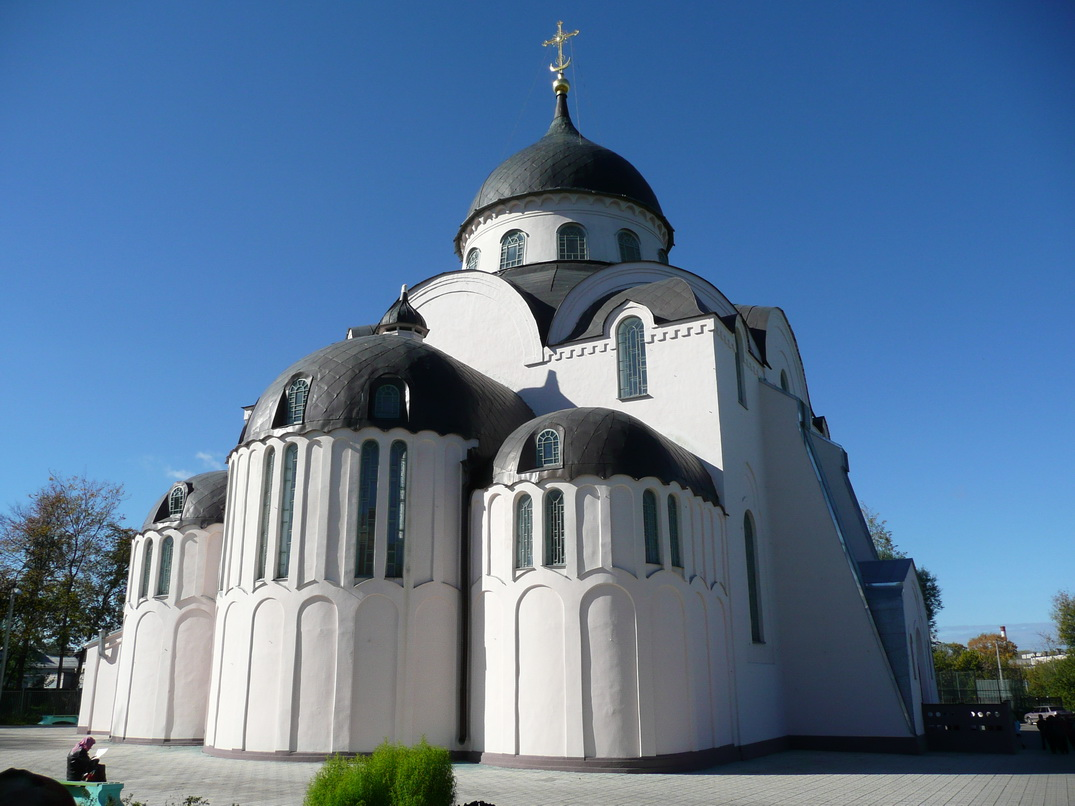
- Resurrection Cathedral in Tver, September 2010

Location
- Deaneries: 14
- Headquarters: Tver

Statistics
- Churches: 252

Information
- Denomination: Eastern Orthodox
- Sui iuris church: Russian Orthodox Church
- Established: 1271
- Cathedral: Resurrection Cathedral
- Language: Church Slavonic

Current leadership
- Governance: Eparchy
- Bishop: Ambrose (Yermakov) since 25 August 2020

Website
- tvereparhia.ru

The Diocese of Tver (Russian: Тверская епархия) is an eparchy of the Russian Orthodox Church in Tver Oblast and is one of the oldest dioceses of the Russian Orthodox Church.

== History ==
The Tver diocese separated from the Polotsk diocese at the Grand Prince Yaroslav Yaroslavich no later than 1271. In 1589, it installed an Archdiocese.

Until 1928, it was called the Diocese of Tver and Kashin. From 1928 to 1943 and from 1950 to 1990, it was the Kalinin and Kashin diocese. From 1943 to 1944 - it was the Diocese of Smolensk and Kalinin. From 1944 to 1950 it was Kalinin and Velikiye Luki Diocese, and then the Diocese of Tver and Kashin again since 1990. On December 28, 2011, Dioceses of Bezhetsk and Rzhev were separated from Tver and Kashin, and three all formed a new Metropoly of Tver, covering all Orthodox parishes in Tver Oblast.

=== Former titles ===
- Tver (1271)
- Tver and Kashin (since 1289)
- Tver and Staritsa (from 1589)
- Kalinin and Kashin (since 1928)
- Kalinin and Staritsa (since 1931)
- Kalinin and Velikiye Luki (since 1935)
- Kalinin and Kashin (since 1950)
- Tver and Kashin (since 1990)
- Tver (since 2011)

== Bishops ==
- Simeon (1272 - February 3, 1289)
- Andrew (Gerdenev) (1289 - March 28, 1316)
- Barsanuphius I (1316-1328)
- Theodore I (1330-1342)
- Theodore II the Kind (1344-1360)
- Basil (1361-1372)
- Euthymius I (Vislen) (9 March 1374 - July 1390)
- Arsenius (July 24, 1390 - March 2, 1409)
- Anthony (February 2, 1411 – 1434)
- Elijah (1435 - mentioned. 1451)
- Moses (28 January 1453 – 1461)
- Gennadius (Kozhin) (25 March 1461 - April 1477)
- Bassian (Strigin-Obolensky) (December 6, 1477 - May 23, 1508)
- Nilus (August 24, 1509 - April 3, 1521)
- Acacius (30 March 1522 - 14 January 1567)
- Barsanuphius II (1567-1570)
- Sabbas (1570 - mentioned. 1572)
- Theodoret (1573-1578)
- Zacharias (20 December 1578 – 1602)
- Theoktistus (1603-1609)
- Arsenius of Elassona (1613-1615)
- Paphnutius (17 February 1620 – 1628)
- Euthymius II (26 October 1628 – 1642)
- Jonah (24 December 1642 - 26 July 1654)
- Lawrence (April 16, 1654 - July 26, 1657)
- Joasaph (August 1657 – 1676)
- Simeon II (April 16, 1676 - mentioned. July 1681)
- Barsanuphius (Yeropkin) (6 September - December 1681)
- Sergius (Veltahov) (5 February 1682 – 1702)
- Callistus (Poborsky) (February 21, 1703 - June 23, 1711)
- Alexis (Titov) (November 9, 1712 - January 21, 1714)
- Barlaam (Kossovskiy) (January 21, 1714 - March 3, 1720)
- Sylvester (Holmsky) (March 3, 1720 - February 3, 1723)
- Theophylact (Lopatinsky) (February 1723 - 13 December 1738)
- Mitrophan (Slotvinsky) (early 1739 - December 7, 1752)
- Benjamin (Putsek-Grigorovich) (28 February 1753 - 2 April 1758)
- Athanasius (Volkhovsky) (April 23, 1758 - May 26, 1763)
- Innocent (Nechayev) (May 28 - October 4, 1763)
- Gabriel (Petrov) (December 6, 1763 - September 22, 1770)
- Platon (Levshin) (October 10, 1770 - January 25, 1775)
- Arsenius (Vereshchagin) (1 April 1775 - 22 September 1783)
- Joasaph (Zabolotsky) (22 September 1783 - 13 February 1788)
- Tikhon (Malinin) (6 May 1788 - 18 May 1792)
- Irenaeus (Klementevsky) (6 June 1792 - 17 October 1798)
- Paul (Ponomaryov) (26 October 1798 - 26 December 1799)
- Paul (Zernov) (15 January 1800 - 18 December 1803)
- Methodius (Smirnov) (December 31, 1803 - August 30, 1814)
- Seraphim (Glagolevsky) (August 30, 1814 - March 15, 1819)
- Philaret (Drozdov) (March 15, 1819 - September 26, 1820)
- Simeon (Krylov-Platonov) (September 26, 1820 - July 3, 1821)
- Jonah (Pavinsky) (July 21, 1821 - November 6, 1826)
- Ambrose (Protasov) (November 6, 1826 - July 1, 1831)
- Gregory (Postnikov) (July 25, 1831 - March 1, 1848)
- Gabriel (Rozanov) (1 March 1848 - 15 February 1857)
- Philotheus (Uspensky) (February 15, 1857 - May 5, 1876)
- Alexis (Rzhanitsyn) (September 9, 1876 - June 9, 1877)
- Eusebius (Ilinskiy) (December 8, 1877 - March 12, 1879)
- Sabbas (Tikhomirov) (April 23, 1879 - September 18, 1896)
- Demetrius (Sambikin) (November 2, 1896 - March 26, 1905)
- Nicholas (Ziorov) (March 26 - April 8, 1905)
- Nicholas (Nalimov) (April 8 - July 1, 1905)
- Alexis (Opotsky) (1 July 1905 - 29 January 1910)
- Anthony (Karzhavin) (January 29, 1910 - March 16, 1914)
- Seraphim (Chichagov) (March 20, 1914 - 17 September 1918)
  - Arsenius (Smolenets) (1917 - 17 September 1917) acting
- Seraphim (Alexandrov) (September 1918 - 15 June 1928)
  - Peter (Zverev) (1922) acting
  - Paul (Pavlovsky) (1926) acting
- Thaddeus (Uspensky) (1928 - October 18, 1936)
- Nicephorus (Nikolskiy) (7 December 1936 – 1937) in prison
- Palladius (Sherstennikov) (1937 - arrested in August 1939)
- Basil (Ratmirov) (August 1941 - September 1944)
- Raphael (Berezin) (October 29, 1944 - May 15, 1945)
- Arsenius (Krylov) (26 August 1945 - 17 March 1950)
- Alexis (Sergeyev) (17 March 1950 - 29 July 1954)
- Barsanuphius (Grinevich) (29 July 1954 - 13 March 1958)
  - Macarius (Dayev) (March 1958 - June 22, 1958) acting, bishop of Mozhaysk
- Theodosius (Pogorsky) (June 22, 1958 - March 22, 1960)
  - Alexis (Konoplyov) (March - November 1960) acting, bishop of Luga
- Innocent (Leoferov) (November 23, 1960 - September 6, 1971)
  - Philaret (Vakhromeev) (6 September 1971 - August 1972) acting, bishop of Dmitrov
- Hermogenes (Orekhov) (August 25, 1972 - April 19, 1978)
- Alexis (Konoplyov) (April 19, 1978 - October 7, 1988)
- Victor (Oleynik) (December 4, 1988 - July 14, 2018)
- Sabbas (Mikheyev) (July 14, 2018 - August 25, 2020)
- Ambrose (Yermakov) (since 25 August 2020)
