= Yaroslav of Tver =

Yaroslav III Yaroslavich
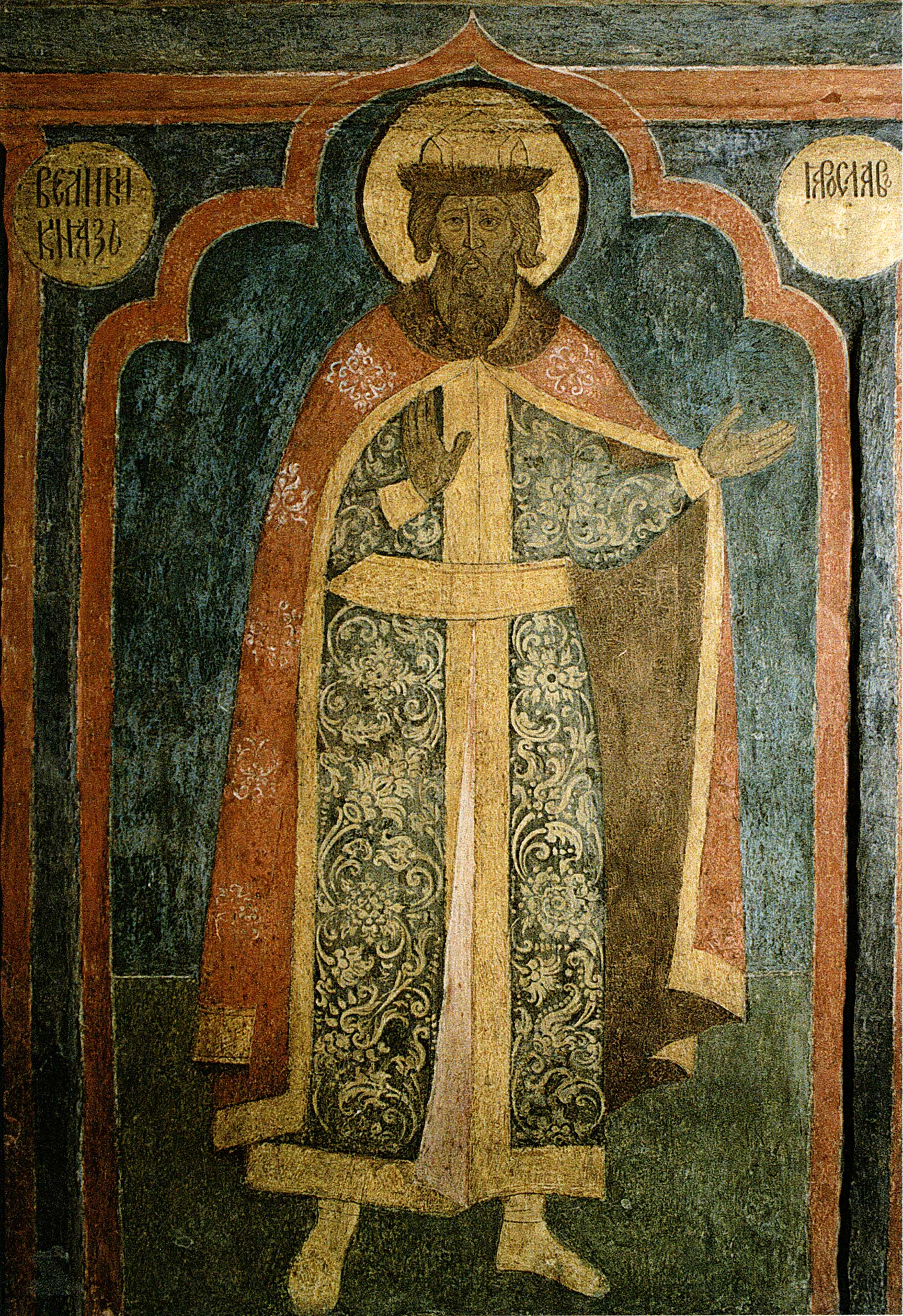
- Yaroslav in the Cathedral of the Archangel in Moscow

Grand Prince of Vladimir
- Reign: 1263–1271
- Predecessor: Alexander Nevsky
- Successor: Vasily of Kostroma

Prince of Tver
- Reign: 1247–1271
- Predecessor: Monarchy established
- Successor: Svyatoslav Yaroslavich

Prince of Novgorod
- Reign: 1255–1256
- Predecessor: Vasily Alexandrovich
- Successor: Vasily Alexandrovich
- Reign: 1266–1267
- Predecessor: Dmitry of Pereslavl
- Successor: Yuri Andreyevich
- Born: 1230
- Died: 9 September 1271 (aged 40/41)
- Spouse: Xenia of Tarusa
- Issue: Mikhail of Tver
- House: Rurik
- Father: Yaroslav II of Vladimir
- Mother: Fedosia Igorevna

Yaroslav III Yaroslavich (Russian: Ярослав Ярославич; 1230 – 9 September 1271) was the first Prince of Tver from 1247, and Grand Prince of Vladimir from 1263 until his death in 1271. All the later princes of Tver descended from him.

Yaroslav and his son Mikhail presided over Tver's transformation into one of the greatest centres of power in medieval Russia which would compete with Moscow.

== Life ==
Yaroslav was born in 1230. He was a son of Yaroslav II and a younger brother of Alexander Nevsky. In 1247, he received from his uncle the town of Tver.

In 1252, Yaroslav and his brother Andrey seized Alexander's capital, Pereslavl-Zalessky. Reinforced by Tatar units, Alexander presently fought it back, taking prisoner Yaroslav's children and leaving his wife as a casualty on the field of battle.

Yaroslav fled to Ladoga, and in 1255, he became the prince of Novgorod after Alexander's son Vasily was expelled; Alexander returned to the city to dismiss the posadnik and by the next year, Vasily was sent back to reign. In 1258, he visited the khan's capital in Sarai, and two years later led the Novgorod army against the Teutonic Knights.

Upon Alexander's death in 1263, Yaroslav quarrelled with Andrey as to who should become grand prince next. They went to the Golden Horde for arbitration, which was in favour of Yaroslav. The latter, however, settled in Novgorod and married a daughter of one local boyar. Various Novgorodian factions still conspired against him and sought to place his brother Vasily of Kostroma or Alexander's son Dmitri of Pereslavl on the throne.

In 1270, the armies of three princes stood for a week near the town of Staraya Russa, ready for battle. The metropolitan, however, managed to reconcile them. Yaroslav, on surrendering Novgorod to his nephew, accompanied him to Sarai. He died on his way back to Tver on 9 September 1271 and was succeeded in Tver by his eldest son Svyatoslav and then by Mikhail.

== See also ==
- Family tree of Russian monarchs

== Bibliography ==
- Fennell, John (23 September 2022). The Emergence of Moscow, 1304-1359. University of California Press. p. 352. ISBN 978-0-520-37358-7.
- Isoaho, Mari (2006). The Image of Aleksandr Nevskiy in Medieval Russia: Warrior and Saint. Leiden: Brill. p. 417. ISBN 9789047409496.
- Martin, Janet (2007). Medieval Russia: 980–1584. Second Edition. E-book. Cambridge: Cambridge University Press. ISBN 978-0-511-36800-4.

Yaroslav of Tver Rurik Born: 1230 Died: 1271
Regnal titles
Preceded by Alexander Nevsky	Grand Prince of Vladimir; 1263–1271	Succeeded by Vasily of Kostroma
Preceded by Vasily Alexandrovich	Prince of Novgorod; 1255–1256	Succeeded by Vasily Alexandrovich
Preceded by Dmitry of Pereslavl	Prince of Novgorod; 1266–1267	Succeeded by Yuri Andreyevich
New division	Prince of Tver; 1247–1271	Succeeded by Sviatoslav Svyatoslavich
Preceded by Alexander Nevsky	Grand Prince of Kiev (titular); 1263–1271	Succeeded by Leo I
