= Jarlig =

Historical Mongol government edict

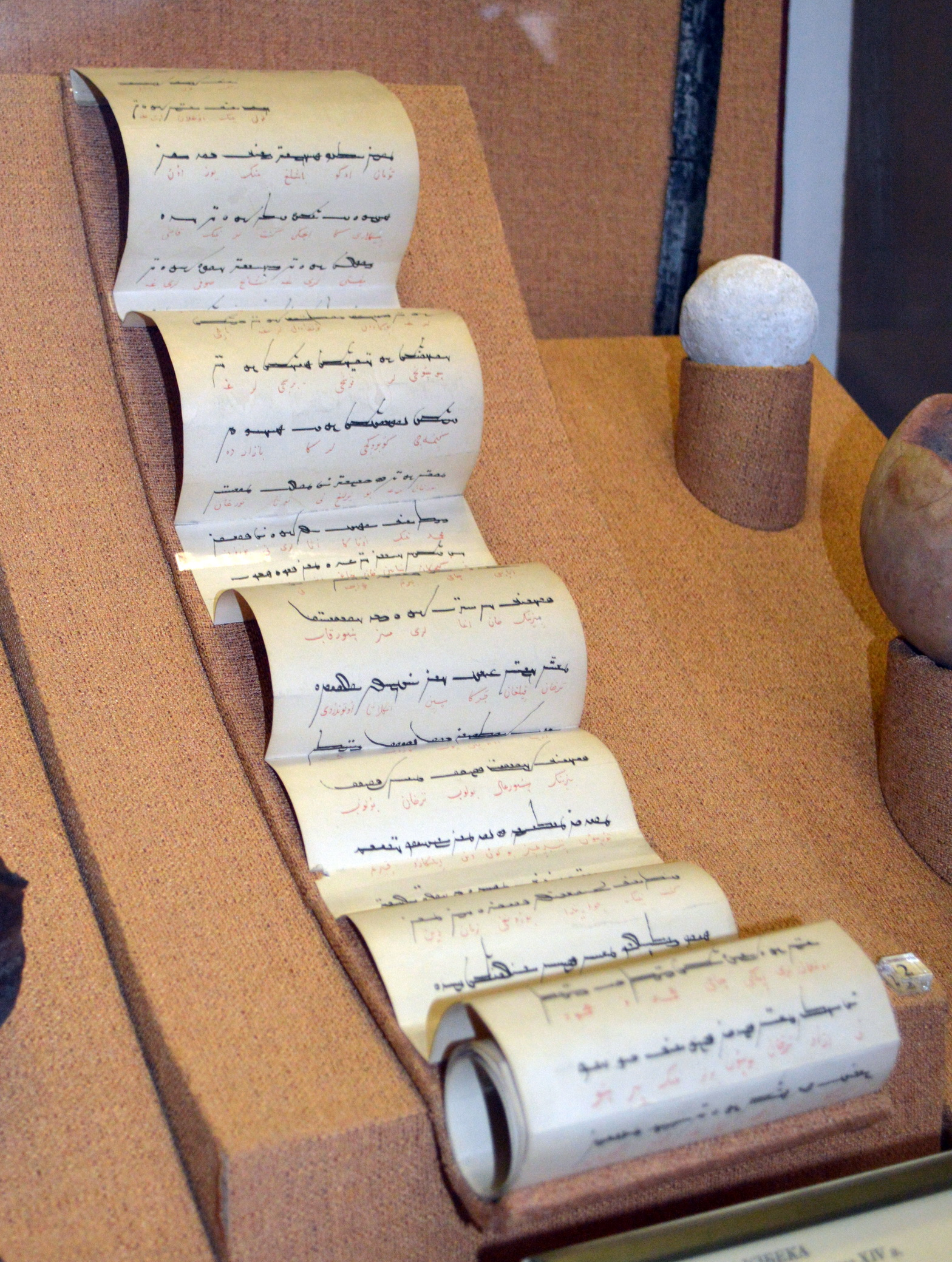
Jarlig of Temür Qutlugh khan (copy), 1397.

A jarlig, also written yarlyk (from Russian: ярлы́к and Ukrainian: ярлик), is an edict, permission, license, or written commandant of Mongol and Chinggisid rulers' "formal diplomas." It was one of three non-fundamental law pronouncements that had the effect of regulation or ordinance, the other two being debter (a record of precedence cases for administration and judicial decisions) and billing (maxims or sayings attributed to Genghis Khan). The jarlig provides important information about the running of the Mongol Empire.

Ögedei Khagan prohibited the nobility from issuing gergees (tablet that gave the bearer authority to demand goods and services from civilian populations) and jarligs in the 1230s.

From the mid-13th to mid-15th centuries, all princes of Northeastern Rus received jarligs authorizing their rule. The issuing of jarligs on governing of Rus finalized the establishment of the title of Grand Duke of Vladimir (Grand Prince). Initially, those jarligs came from the qaghan in Karakorum, but after Batu established the khanate of the Golden Horde (c. 1227), they came from Sarai. None of these jarligs, however, is extant. In the mid-15th century, Grand Duke Basil II of Moscow began forbidding other Rus princes from receiving the jarlig from Mongol khans, thus establishing the right of the Moscow grand prince to authorize local princely rule. Mongol leaders gave the jarlig to emissaries, travelers, monks, and merchants to give them free passage, exemptions from taxes and imposts and security.

Kublai Khan began the practice of having the four great aristocrats in his kheshig sign all jarligs (decrees), a practice that spread to all other Mongol khanates in 1280.

Ghazan reformed the issuance of jarligs (edicts), creating set forms and graded seals, ordering that all jarligs be kept on file at court in Persia. Jarligs older than 30 years were to be canceled, along with old paizas (Mongol seals of authority).

Even after 1260, the Yuan Dynasty in China still considered jarlig must be issued by only Qa'an/Khagan (Emperor) but linkji by khans (princes) of three western khanates. However, some high-ranking officials continued to issue jarligs under the name of a khan or Emperor in Central Asia.

The Rus' metropolitan archive preserves six jarligs, constituting the so-called Short Collection, which are considered to be translations into Russian of authentic patents issued from the Qipchaq Khanate:

1. from Khan Tiuliak (Tulunbek) of Mamai's Horde to Metropolitan Mikhail (Mitia) (1379)
2. from Khatun Taydula to the Rus' princes (1347)
3. from Khan Mengu-Timur to Metropolitan Peter (1308)
4. from Khatun Taydula to Metropolitan Feognost (1343)
5. from Khan Berdibeg to Metropolitan Alexius (Alexei) (1357)
6. from Khatun Taydula to Metropolitan Alexius (1354)

A seventh jarlig, which purports to be from Khan Özbeg to Metropolitan Peter, found in the so-called full collection, has been determined to be a sixteenth-century forgery. The jarlig to the metropolitans affirm the freedom of the Church from taxes and tributes, and declare that the Church's property should be protected from expropriation or damage as long as Rus' churchmen pray for the well-being of the khan and his family.

== Contemporary use ==
In modern Mongolian, the term (Mongolian: зарлиг, romanized: zarlig) is used to refer to official edicts.

In Russian culture, the word is used to refer to a label, or, rarely, a price tag. It may also refer to an icon shortcut in modern graphical user interfaces.

As an example of a reborrowing, the word also re-entered the Mongolian language with the Russian meaning and pronunciation.

== See also ==
- Firman

== Bibliography ==
- Kołodziejczyk, Dariusz (2011). The Crimean Khanate and Poland-Lithuania: International Diplomacy on the European Periphery (15th-18th Century). A Study of Peace Treaties Followed by Annotated Documents. Leiden: Brill. ISBN 9789004191907. Archived from the original on 2017-06-30.
