= Grand Principality of Moscow =

Russian principality (1263–1547)

Principality of Moscow (1263–1389) Московское княжество Grand Principality of Moscow (1389–1547) Великое княжество Московское
- 1263–1478/1547 (Note: Some historians date the transformation of the grand principality into a centralized Russian state to the reign of Ivan III (r. 1462–1505), particularly the formal annexation of Novgorod in 1478, after which he assumed the title of sovereign and grand prince of all Russia, although the title of tsar would not be officially adopted until 1547.)
- Double-headed eagle on the seal of Ivan III

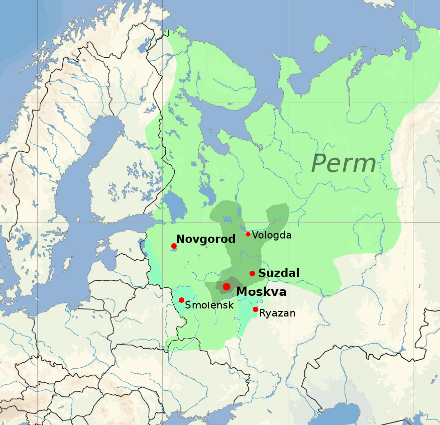
- Principality in 1300 Grand principality in 1389 Grand principality in 1505 Grand principality in 1533
- Capital: Moscow
- Common languages: Russian; Church Slavonic^{1}
- Religion: Russian Orthodoxy
- Demonym: Muscovite
- Government: Feudal monarchy
- Monarch
  - 1263–1303: Daniel (first)
  - 1533–1547: Ivan IV (last)
- Legislature: Boyar Duma
- Historical era: Late Middle Ages
  - Established: 1263
  - Elevated to grand principality: 1389
  - Elevated to tsardom: 1547

Area
- 1425: 430,000 km^{2} (170,000 sq mi)
- 1474: 520,000 km^{2} (200,000 sq mi)
- 1478: 1,240,000 km^{2} (480,000 sq mi)
- 1487: 1,570,000 km^{2} (610,000 sq mi)
- 1505: 2,500,000 km^{2} (970,000 sq mi)
- Currency: Ruble
Preceded by	Succeeded by
Vladimir-Suzdal	Tsardom of Russia
- 1: Liturgical and literary language

The Grand Principality of Moscow, (Note: Russian: Великое княжество Московское, romanized: Velikoye knyazhestvo Moskovskoye. Alternatively translated as the Grand Duchy of Moscow.) before 1389 the Principality of Moscow, (Note: Russian: Московское княжество, romanized: Moskovskoye knyazhestvo. Also translated as the Duchy of Moscow.) also known by the exonym Muscovy, (Note: Latin: Moscovia.) was a late medieval Russian monarchy. Its capital was the city of Moscow. Originally established as an appanage principality in the 13th century, Moscow became the leading Russian principality and was transformed into a centralized Russian state in the late 15th century, laying the groundwork for Tsarist Russia.

Moscow became a separate principality when Daniel (r. 1263–1303), the youngest son of Alexander Nevsky, received the city and surrounding area as an appanage. By the end of the 13th century, Moscow had become one of the leading principalities within the Grand Principality of Vladimir, alongside Tver. A struggle between the princes of Moscow and Tver began after Mikhail of Tver became grand prince in 1304. Yury (r. 1303–1325) contested the title and was later made grand prince in 1318 by the khan of the Golden Horde, who held suzerainty over the princes. However, Yury would lose the title four years later.

Ivan I (r. 1325–1340) regained the title of grand prince and was able to collect tribute for the khan from other Russian princes, which increased Moscow's wealth. The seat of the Russian Orthodox Church was also moved from Vladimir to Moscow, establishing it as the spiritual center of Russian Orthodoxy. Ivan I defeated Tver and secured the grand princely title for his sons, Simeon (r. 1340–1353) and Ivan II (r. 1353–1359). After Ivan II's death, the title was temporarily lost until it was regained by Dmitry (r. 1359–1389), who permanently united the thrones of Vladimir and Moscow by the end of his reign. He also inflicted a milestone defeat on the Tatars in 1380, which greatly increased Moscow's prestige.

As the Golden Horde declined, its hegemony was increasingly challenged. Vasily I (r. 1389–1425) greatly expanded the size of his domain, but was ultimately forced to resume paying tribute due to Tatar raids. Vasily II (r. 1425–1462) consolidated his control of Moscow after a civil war and his reign saw the Russian Church declare autocephaly in 1448. The fall of Constantinople in 1453 confirmed the nascent independence of the Russian Church. Ivan III (r. 1462–1505) absorbed nearly all of the Russian states and laid the foundations for a centralized state. The formal annexation of Novgorod in 1478 led him to eventually adopt the title of sovereign of all Russia. The reign of Ivan III marks the end of the appanage period and the beginning of a new period in Russian history known as Muscovite Russia. His defeat of the Tatars in 1480 also traditionally marks the end of Tatar suzerainty. Vasily III (r. 1505–1533) completed the annexation of the remaining appanages. His son, Ivan IV (r. 1533–1584), was crowned as the first Russian tsar in 1547, thereby formally establishing the Tsardom of Russia.

== Name ==
The English names Moscow and Muscovy, for the city, the principality, and the river, are derived from post-classical Latin Moscovia, Muscovia, and ultimately from the Old Russian fully vocalized accusative form Московь, Moskov'. Moscow is first mentioned under the year 1147 in the locative case (na Moskvě). The modern Russian form, Moskva, first appears in the 14th century.

The oldest endonyms used in documents were Rus (Russian: Русь) and Russkaya zemlya (Russian: Русская земля, lit. 'Russian land'). The 14th-century Zadonshchina, which belongs to the Kulikovo cycle of works, stresses the unity of the Russian princes and describes the principalities of Moscow, Novgorod, and others as being part of the "Russian land". A new form of the name became common by the 15th century; the vernacular Rus was transformed into Ros(s)iya or Rus(s)iya, and borrowed from Greek: Ρωσία, romanized: Rosía, or Latin: Russia. (Note: The old form is preserved in what has been designated as ethnically Russian. In addition, both forms are sometimes used in certain grammatical formations e.g. velikorossy ('Great Russians') and velikorusskaya when referring to language.) Following the fall of the Byzantine Empire in 1453, the name Rosiya (Росия), derived from the Byzantine term and initially used in ecclesiastical circles, began appearing in the official titles of secular rulers. In the 1480s, the scribes Ivan Cherny and Mikhail Medovartsev referred to Russia as Rosia (Росиа). Medovartsev also mentioned the scepter "of Russian lordship" (Росийскаго господства, Rosiyskago gospodstva).

The title of knyaz (prince) was originally used in Kievan Rus', and as other principalities emerged, the senior ruler later became known as the veliky knyaz (grand prince). (Note: Although knyaz is usually translated as 'prince' and veliky knyaz as 'grand prince' or 'grand duke', neither 'prince' nor 'duke' is strictly correct as knyaz actually comes from *kuningaz, the same origin as the word 'king'.) In the 14th century, the grand princes of Moscow began to style themselves as the rulers of all Russia. The title of grand prince also grew from little more than a literary embellishment to one with clear legal overtones, especially as the ruler of Moscow pursued a policy of centralization. During his consolidation of territories, Ivan III adopted the title of sovereign (gosudar) of all Russia. After rejecting Mongol suzerainty, he also styled himself as autocrat (samoderzhets). In his foreign correspondence, he adopted the title of tsar and rejected the offer of kingship by the Holy Roman Emperor; however, it would not be until 1547 that the title of tsar became official with the coronation of his grandson, Ivan IV. Ivan III also laid claim to the legacy of Kievan Rus', which led to conflicts with the Grand Duchy of Lithuania. From the 16th century, the Russian state was also known in Western Europe as Muscovy (Note: Latin: Moscovia; French: Moscovie.) as a result of Polish–Lithuanian influence; (Note: The term Muscovite state appears in the 1480s in the works of Polish chronicler Jan Długosz. Later, it was used in the Grand Duchy of Lithuania, the Kingdom of Poland, and then the Polish–Lithuanian Commonwealth to refer to the entirety of the Russian state. The term Muscovite state was also occasionally used in Russian sources from the late 16th century, alongside Russian tsardom, likely as a consequence of the Polish–Lithuanian tradition, but corresponding to the previous concept of the Muscovite principality. The concept of the Russian tsardom as a conglomerate of several states that had replaced the Russian principalities became dominant in the 17th and 18th centuries.) the use of both names persisted until the early 18th century.

Other formal names used in historiography for the grand principality following its merger with Vladimir include the Grand Principality of All Russia, the Grand Principality of Great Russia, the Grand Principality of Moscow, Vladimir and All Rus, and the Grand Principality of Vladimir-Moscow or the Grand Principality of Moscow-Vladimir.

== History ==
=== Origins ===
Moscow is first mentioned in chronicles under the year 1147, as part of the principality of Rostov-Suzdal. (Note: Moscow is mentioned as a meeting place of Prince Yuri Dolgorukiy: "Прииди ко мне, брате, в Москов [Come to me, brother, to Moscow]".) The importance of Moscow greatly increased during the second half of the 12th century, and it was converted into a fortified gorod (stronghold) in the 1150s. On the death of Vsevolod III in 1212, Moscow appears to have been passed to his son Yury, who succeeded his father as the grand prince of Vladimir. During the Mongol invasions of 1237–1238, Moscow was sacked following the destruction of Ryazan. The city is not mentioned again until the late 13th century.

The first prince of Moscow was Daniel (r. 1263–1303), the youngest son of Aleksandr Nevsky, and he was given Moscow as an otchina, where he established a local branch of Rurikid princes. (Note: Two chronicles refer to Mikhail Khorobrit as "Mikhail of Moscow", but Daniel is usually considered to be the first prince of Moscow. On Mikhail's death in 1248, if it is assumed that an appanage principality was created, Moscow reverted as an escheat to the grand prince.) Until 1271, the principality was ruled by the governors of Daniel's uncle Yaroslav. Daniel himself is first mentioned under the year 1282 as taking part in a feudal war between his two older brothers. The 16th-century Book of Royal Degrees says that Daniel was given Moscow on his father's death in 1263. The size of the original territory of the Moscow principality is not known, but it likely encompassed the basin of the upper Moskva River, stretching approximately between the eastern influx of the Gzhelka and the western influx of the Ruza. The northeast of the territory consisted of the basin of the upper Klyazma.

By the turn of the century, Moscow was one of the leading principalities within the Grand Principality of Vladimir. However, relations between the Russian princes remained tense after Andrey of Gorodets became the grand prince in 1293. As a result, Toqta, the khan of the Golden Horde, convened a congress of the princes in Pereyaslavl in 1297, at which the traditional succession principle of lestvitsa was reaffirmed. Daniel defeated Ryazan in 1301, after which Kolomna and Serpukhov were incorporated into the Moscow principality. Pereyaslavl was also temporarily annexed to Moscow, and after Daniel's death, his sons seized Mozhaysk in 1304. At this point, the territory of the principality had increased almost three-fold and included the entire Moskva River along with its tributaries, allowing Moscow to become self-sufficient. Its southern border included a large stretch of the Oka, from Serpukhov to the east of Kolomna, which gave it some protection from Tatar incursions. To the east, there was a dense forest zone which functioned as a natural barrier. Moscow also had access to the northern areas of Ryazan and direct access to Vladimir. It was also provided with an extensive river network that facilitated trade.

=== Yury ===
Yury (r. 1303–1325) began his reign with a struggle against Tver for succession to the grand principality. According to traditional succession practices, the throne was to be passed to Andrey's eldest cousin, Mikhail of Tver. As Daniel had died before he could become grand prince, his descendants were barred from the title. (Note: According to John Fennell: "Had Daniil survived Andrey he would have been next in the line of succession. But in accordance with the laws of seniority a nephew was automatically debarred from the title if his father predeceased the ruling grand prince. Unwritten laws and tradition, however, were not sufficient to guarantee the legitimate heir his throne".) Yury decided to contest Mikhail's claim to the title, but ultimately the decision went to Toqta, who held suzerainty over the principalities and later confirmed Mikhail as the grand prince in 1305. In 1306, Yury established his authority over Ryazan with support from the khan as part of the Tatars' strategy to adjust the balance of power in the conflict between Moscow and Tver. Mikhail of Tver attempted to consolidate his power, and was confirmed as the prince of Novgorod in 1307, but Yury retained control of Pereyaslavl and was able to gain control of Nizhny Novgorod. Mikhail marched against Moscow in 1308, but the Muscovites were able to stand their ground. Mikhail also failed to win the support of the Russian Church, and when he launched an expedition to Nizhny Novgorod, his army was stopped by Metropolitan Peter in Vladimir.

After Toqta died in 1312, Mikhail visited Sarai to renew his patent and pay respects to the new khan, Özbeg, staying there for two years. In his absence, the Novgorodians launched a revolt against Mikhail's governors and sent an appeal to Yury, who was confirmed as their prince in 1315. (Note: The chronicle entry says: "In that year (1314) the men of Novgorod summoned a veche because they hated the namestniki of Prince Mikhail Yaroslavich of Tver', for they had suffered much offence and injury at their hands and they desired to expel them".) However, Mikhail was able to convince the khan to summon Yury and remove him from the political scene. Mikhail was able to establish his authority in Novgorod once again, but in 1317, Yury returned with a patent for the grand princely title, a Tatar army, and a Tatar wife, who was the sister of the khan. Kavgady, the chief representative of the khan, sent his ambassadors to Tver to scare Mikhail into submission, but Mikhail's army proceeded to defeat Yury's army in December 1317. In early 1318, the two parties met on the Volga for another battle, but they reached an agreement. Kavgady and Yury laid their accusations against Mikhail and a formal trial took place at the end of the year. Mikhail was executed at the Horde and Yury was made the grand prince.

Little is known about Yury's reign as grand prince, but relations between Moscow and Tver soon improved and a treaty was concluded in 1319 between Yury and Dmitry of Tver. However, in 1321, a representative of the khan instructed Yury to march on Tver. The two forces met on the Volga and a battle was narrowly avoided. In the treaty, Dmitry agreed to refrain from making himself the grand prince and he paid the tribute owed to the Tatars. Yury was then summoned to Novgorod, and instead of proceeding to Sarai with the tribute, he led the defense of the republic against Swedish forces. As a result, Dmitry went to Sarai and received the patent for the grand princely title in 1322. Yury was then summoned by Özbeg, and on his way to Sarai, Dmitry's brother Aleksandr robbed him in the Rzhev area and forced him to flee to Pskov. Yury finally visited Sarai in 1325 to face the consequences, but Dmitry of Tver murdered him as revenge for the death of his father. The following year, the khan ordered his execution.

=== Ivan I ===
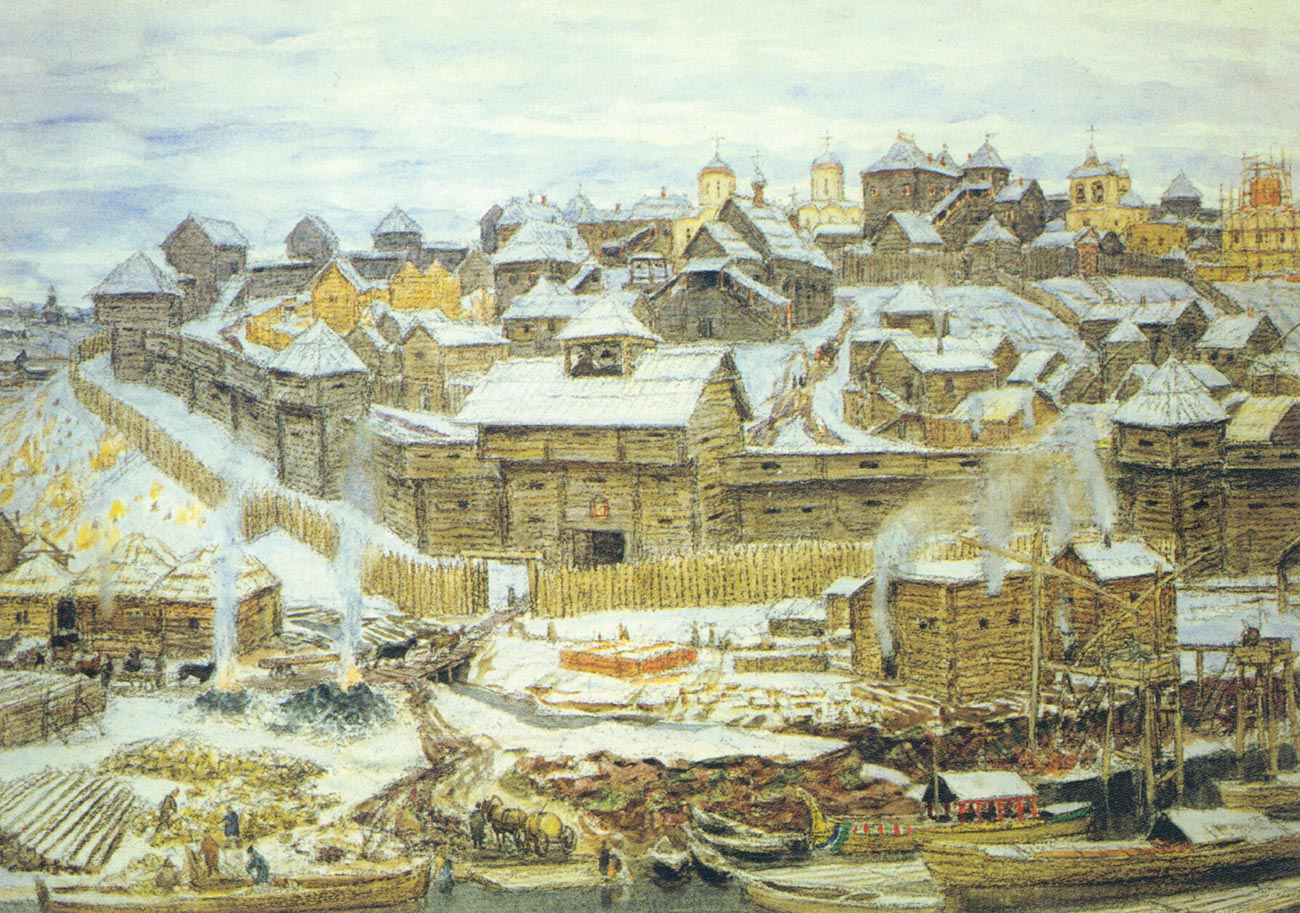
The Moscow Kremlin under Ivan Kalita, painting by Apollinary Vasnetsov, 1921

Ivan I (r. 1325–1340) became prince following the murder of Yury, while the title of grand prince went to Aleksandr of Tver. After the residents of Tver launched a revolt against Tatar rule in 1327, Özbeg Khan dispatched a punitive force led by Ivan and Aleksandr of Suzdal, causing Aleksandr of Tver to flee to Lithuania. Afterwards, Ivan presented himself before Özbeg and was given the title of grand prince. Özbeg divided the principalities of Vladimir and Novgorod between Aleksandr of Suzdal and Ivan, and upon Aleksandr's death in 1331, Ivan became the sole grand prince. Aleksandr of Tver eventually returned to Tver and was given a full pardon and reinstated as prince by the khan. However, Aleksandr was soon recalled to Sarai in 1339, where he was executed due to accusations made against him. The death of Aleksandr marked the end of the struggle between Moscow and Tver, and Ivan's nephew-in-law, Konstantin, continued to rule Tver as a loyal servant.

To secure his position, Ivan began absorbing surrounding principalities. In particular, Ivan was credited by his grandson Dmitry Donskoy in his will with purchasing the principalities of Beloozero, Galich and Uglich. (Note: Some historians have suggested that the principalities were bought by Ivan and attached to the grand princely domain rather than the land of Moscow, while the princes of those districts were given certain proprietary rights. Others have suggested that those princes sold their land on the condition that they would be allowed to stay there with certain rights.) Ivan also developed Moscow to attract people and produce the resources needed to maintain his position, a policy reflected in his sobriquet, Kalita (lit. 'moneybag'). As grand prince, Ivan collected tribute from not only his own possessions but also from other Russian princes that were dependent on him. The khan at the start of Ivan's reign was content with allowing the Muscovite prince to enjoy undisputed supremacy. As a result, Ivan was able to use the funds he acquired to develop Moscow. He also had access to Novgorod's wealth, which helped him to pay the tribute; however, relations with Novgorod worsened following the election of a new archbishop in 1330, which paved the way for a pro-Lithuanian faction in the city.

At the beginning of Ivan's reign, the Russian metropolitan, Peter, moved his residence to Moscow in 1325. This was crucial for Moscow's rise as the Russian Orthodox Church helped inspire unity among the divided Russian principalities. During Peter's tenure in Moscow, Ivan laid the foundation for the Dormition Cathedral, which was built using stone. Peter had intended to make Moscow his burial place, and therefore the religious center of the country, and he died in 1326. Peter was succeeded by Theognostus, who, like his predecessor, pursued policies that supported the rise of Moscow. During the first four years of his tenure, the Dormition Cathedral was completed and an additional four stone churches were constructed. Theognostus also proceeded with the canonization of Peter in 1339, which helped to increase Moscow's prestige. The princes of Moscow functioned as the primary protectors of the Russian Church and Moscow became a pilgrimage center. Ivan even acquired an aura of sanctity in the eyes of future generations.

=== Simeon ===
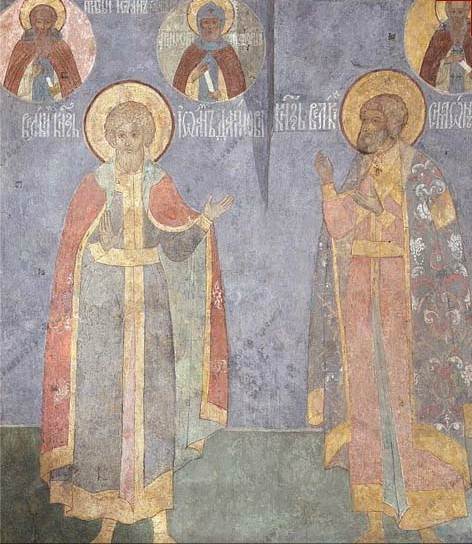
Ivan I and Simeon, frescoes of the Archangel Cathedral, 1652–1666

Simeon (r. 1340–1353) succeeded his father as prince upon the latter's death. Although Simeon had to contend with three rival princes for the grand princely title, Özbeg had approved his father's will in 1339, indicating that he supported Simeon's succession to the grand princely throne. Simeon received the patent a few months later. As a result, the princes of Moscow continued to hold the title almost uninterruptedly. At the start of Simeon's reign, the principality of Bryansk returned to Moscow's sphere of influence after the pro-Muscovite Dmitry Romanovich was once again installed as prince. (Note: It would not be until 1356–1357 that the Lithuanians would regain control of Bryansk, after which it would remain under Lithuanian control for the next century and a half.) As a demonstration of his political sympathies, Dmitry had his daughter married to Simeon's younger brother Ivan. In 1352, Simeon marched into the neighboring principality of Smolensk, located to the west of Moscow, and was able to extend his authority there with the removal of the pro-Lithuanian prince, who was likely replaced with either Dmitry Romanovich's son or nephew. As a result, Simeon was able to temporarily halt the eastward expansion of Lithuania. He was also able to sign a treaty with Novgorod, in which the city recognized Simeon as its prince and agreed to grant him additional tax revenues.

Although the khan, Jani Beg, was prepared to support Simeon in his conflict with Lithuania, he was unwilling to provide unlimited support to Moscow, for fear that it would become too strong. He permitted the grand prince to enjoy the traditional rights of the throne and to maintain his nominal authority over other princes, but he interfered in Moscow's relations with Suzdal, supported anti-Muscovite elements in Ryazan, and contributed to Tver's fragmentation. When Jani Beg first occupied the throne, Simeon's cousin Konstantin of Suzdal took advantage of the power struggle in Sarai and gained control of Nizhny Novgorod and Gorodets. (Note: The Rogozh Chronicle says that Konstantin Vasilyevich "sat in Nizhny Novgorod [and] Gorodets upon the grand-princely throne", which indicates that he obtained the right to the title from the khan.) Simeon attempted to dislodge his cousin, and in 1343, he convinced the boyars of Nizhny Novgorod and Gorodets to switch allegiance, but Jani Beg returned the boyars to Konstantin and confirmed him as prince.

In 1352–1353, the Black Death reached Russia, which killed Simeon, his brother Andrey, along with his sons. In addition, the plague killed Metropolitan Theognostus. The ruling family of Moscow remained small as a result of the Black Death, and a new vertical pattern of princely succession from father to son was defined. The plague also killed perhaps a quarter of the entire Russian population, which in turn led to labor shortages and a reduction in the amount of tribute that could be collected. At the same time, the Golden Horde experienced an economic downfall that would contribute to its disintegration.

=== Ivan II ===
Ivan II (r. 1353–1359) went to Sarai following the death of his older brother, where he presented himself to the khan as a candidate for the patent for the grand princely title. His main opponent was Konstantin of Nizhny Novgorod-Suzdal, who had greater support than the rival princes before him. Novgorod sent a delegation to the khan requesting him to give the patent to Konstantin, due to Ivan's previous refusal to aid the Novgorodian army in besieging the Swedish-held fortress of Orekhov in 1348. Despite this, Jani Beg gave the patent to Ivan due to Konstantin's dynastic links with Lithuania. In 1355, Konstantin signed a treaty of friendship with Moscow and at the same time, the city of Novgorod "made peace with Prince Ivan". Following Konstantin's death the same year, his eldest son Andrey succeeded him and drew a treaty with Ivan the next year. In exchange for gifts, Andrey recognized the prince of Moscow as his "elder brother", or feudal superior.

During the first four years of Ivan's reign, there are no signs of any antagonism between Ivan and Grand Duke Algirdas of Lithuania. Ivan did not strengthen control of his brother's gains and was disinterested in his former father-in-law's principality of Bryansk. In 1356, Algirdas captured Bryansk and Smolensk; however, Ivan did not provide military assistance, leading to Vasily of Smolensk to turn to the khan instead. Although no formal treaty was drawn, Ivan had one of his daughters married to the son of Karijotas, the fifth eldest son of Gediminas. Ivan continued his reversal of Simeon's policies by allying himself with the princes of Suzdal. In addition, he supported the sons of Aleksandr of Tver and not the pro-Muscovite house of Kashin in Tver. Khvost, a friend of Ivan amongst the boyars, was murdered by the senior boyars, who had been staunch supporters of Simeon. As a result, Ivan significantly changed his policy in 1357, first by signing a treaty with Vasily of Kashin. In 1358, a joint expedition with Mozhaysk and Tver drove the Lithuanians out of Rzhev. The following year, Algirdas launched an attack, regaining control of Smolensk and Rzhev while taking control of Mstislavl in the Smolensk principality.

=== Dmitry ===
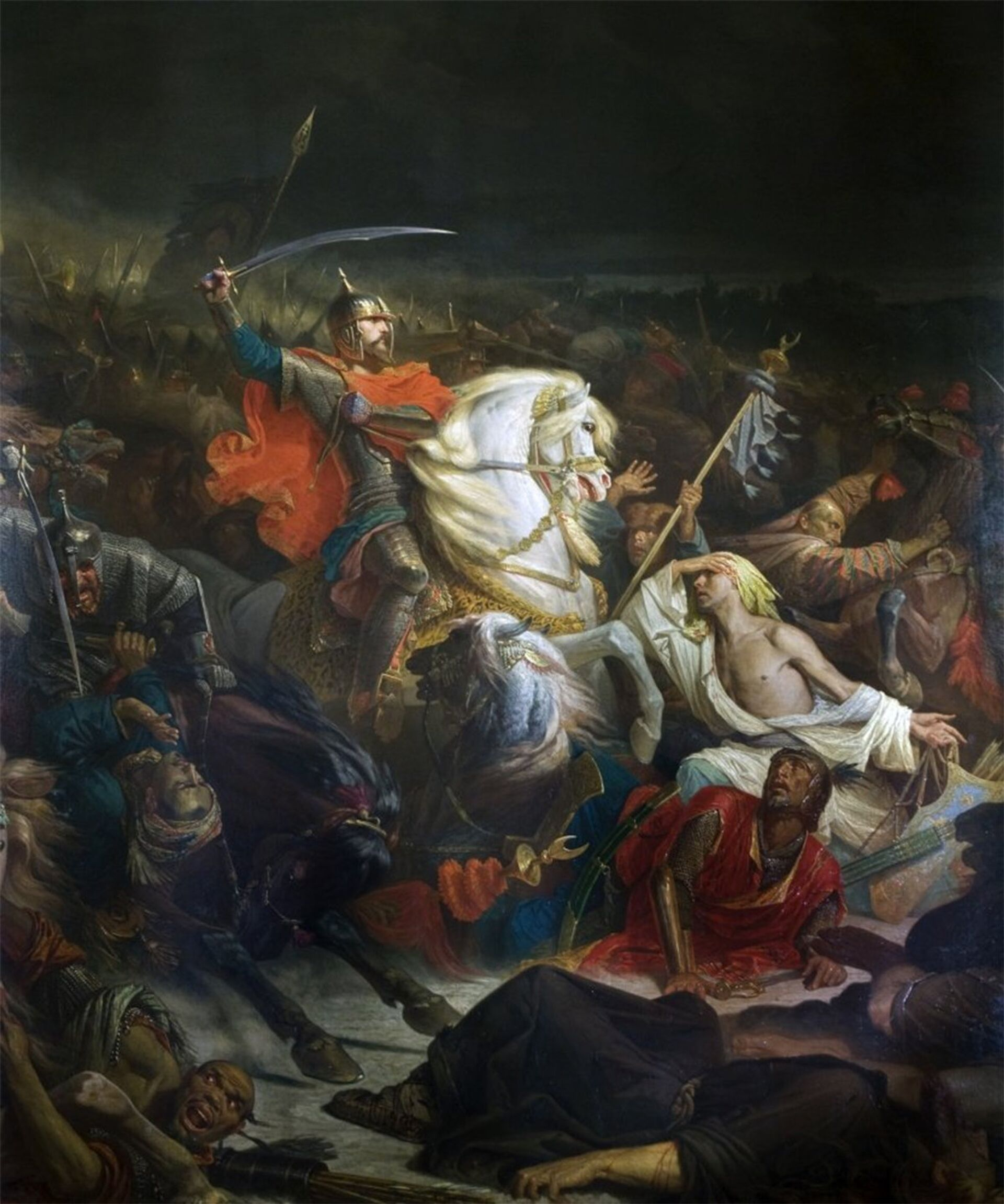
Dmitry Donskoy in the Battle of Kulikovo, painting by Adolphe Yvon, 1849

Dmitry (r. 1359–1389) became prince at the age of nine following his father's death. Metropolitan Alexius effectively became the ruler of Moscow, and he equated the interests of the Russian Church with those of the Moscow principality. The murder of Berdi Beg in 1359 led to great turmoil within the Golden Horde, with repeated coups. The warlord Mamai established his own ulus, exercising his authority with khans that he controlled. Dmitry of Nizhny Novgorod-Suzdal renewed the claim to the grand princely title, but after a period of negotiations, the khan Murad recognized Dmitry of Moscow as grand prince in 1362. Alexius also approached Mamai's protégé Abdallāh and received his approval as well in order to strengthen Dmitry's claim. However, Murad withdrew his recognition in response and instead recognized Dmitry of Suzdal as grand prince. After the Muscovite army made a show of force, Dmitry of Suzdal abandoned his claim to the title and in 1364, he signed a treaty of friendship with Moscow. Two years later, he arranged for his daughter to marry Dmitry of Moscow.

After taking the throne, Mikhail II of Tver mounted a direct challenge to Moscow's pre-eminence with Lithuanian support. Alexius continued to support the appanage princes of Tver against Mikhail, and by 1368, the conflict had escalated when the Muscovite army invaded Tver. The Lithuanian army came to Mikhail's aid, but the new stone walls of Moscow were able to withstand the siege. Dmitry launched another invasion in 1370, taking advantage of Lithuanian involvement in other conflicts. Mikhail visited Mamai's court and received the patent, but was unable to enforce his claim without Lithuanian assistance. Mikhail received another patent the following year, but Dmitry convinced the khan to restore him the title, while Alexius negotiated a peace treaty with Lithuania and had Dmitry's cousin Vladimir of Serpukhov married to one of the daughters of Algirdas. Mikhail once again received the patent in 1375, but Dmitry retained the loyalty of the other princes, and the combined forces defeated Mikhail's army. Mikhail made peace and acknowledged Dmitry as his "elder brother".

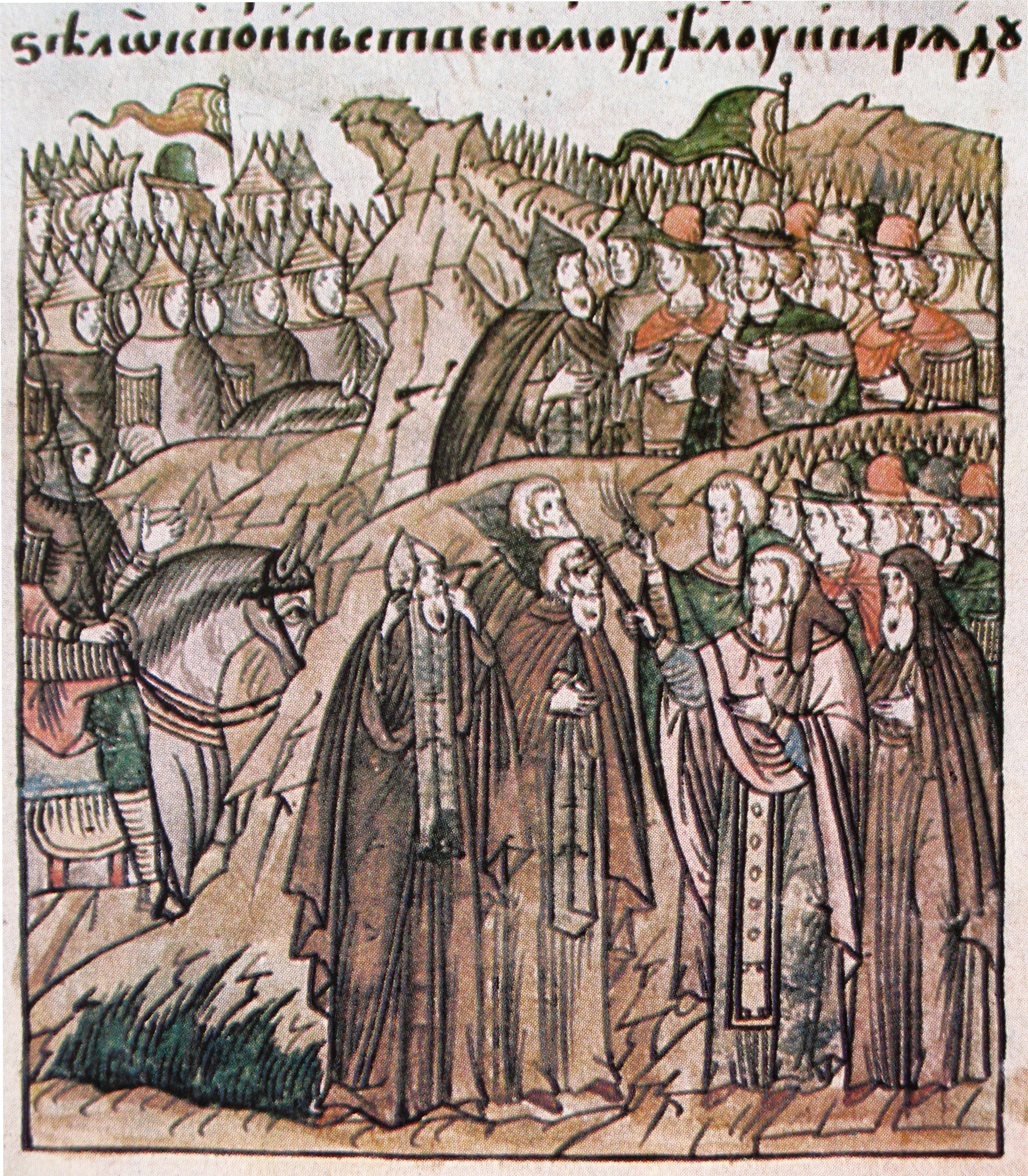
Sergius of Radonezh blessing Alexander Peresvet before the Battle of Kulikovo, miniature from the Illustrated Chronicle of Ivan the Terrible

Dmitry expanded his domain by incorporating the principalities of Beloozero, Galich and Uglich, those that he credited his grandfather Ivan I with purchasing. As Moscow grew, the warlord Timur built his own empire in Central Asia and recruited Tokhtamysh into his ranks. Tokhtamysh took control of Sarai and united the Horde under his rule. After a period of relative stability, the rise of Tokhtamysh threatened the position of Mamai, who opted to reduce the Russian principalities into submission. In 1378, Dmitry mobilized his forces against him and won a victory in the Battle of the Vozha River. Afterwards, Mamai mobilized a large army and made an alliance with Lithuania. He also recruited Oleg II of Ryazan, whose domain had been exposed to constant attack from the steppe. Dmitry gathered troops from all the territories he controlled, although no forces were sent from Novgorod, Nizhny Novgorod or Tver. He was joined by Andrei of Polotsk and Dmitry of Bryansk, members of the Lithuanian ruling house who were enemies of their half-brother Jogaila. Before the Lithuanian army could join Mamai's forces, the Russian troops defeated them in the 1380 Battle of Kulikovo and Mamai fled south.

Although later generations saw the Russian victory as a triumph, the principalities remained under Mongol suzerainty and Tokhtamysh launched a punitive expedition, sacking Moscow in 1382. Despite this, Moscow greatly increased its prestige and Dmitry made Oleg of Ryazan recognize him as his feudal superior again. After Moscow was sacked, Dmitry accepted Mongol suzerainty and he was confirmed as the grand prince. The khan forced him to collect an exceptionally large amount of tribute and held his son Vasily as hostage. The wealthiest center in Russia, Novgorod, objected to paying a special tax, leading to Dmitry to launch an expedition in 1386 to force the city to pay.

In the last years of his reign, Dmitry focused on strengthening his authority among the Russian princes, particularly those of Tver and Ryazan. Dmitry made the first deliberate move towards primogeniture and he guaranteed his eldest son, Vasily, that he would succeed him. In his testament, he bequeathed the grand principality to Vasily. Dmitry for the first time managed inseparably to identify the grand principality with Moscow by gaining recognition from the Tatars that the title of grand prince, along with the territories dependent on Vladimir, was a family possession.

=== Vasily I ===
Vasily I (r. 1389–1425) continued to expand the grand principality by taking advantage of political strife in the Golden Horde. In 1392, Tokhtamysh's forces were defeated by Timur, and during a visit to the weakened khan's court, Vasily was given permission to take the throne of Nizhny Novgorod. In 1395, Timur led a large army and destroyed Tokhtamysh's forces in the North Caucasus. Timur then set about devastating Tokhtamysh's domains and turned his army towards Moscow. Vasily gathered an army, while Metropolitan Cyprian brought the Our Lady of Vladimir icon, but Timur stopped his advance and withdrew from Russian territory. Edigu drove Tokhtamysh into exile and came to dominate the steppe, but paid little attention to Moscow, instead focusing on Lithuania. As a result, Vasily stopped paying tribute and did not recognize the suzerainty of successive khans. However, in 1408, Edigu launched a devastating invasion and laid siege to Moscow, but the city managed to survive the attack. Edigu agreed to withdraw his forces on the condition that he would be paid a large indemnity. In 1410, Tatar raids led to the sacking of the old capital, Vladimir, and in 1412, Vasily went to the khan to renew his patent for the grand princely title. In Edigei's last years, the Horde was weakened by internal divisions, and by 1420, it would soon be replaced by successive khanates.

At the start of his reign, Vasily posed no threat to the ambitions of Vytautas and assumed the role of junior partner. Vasily married his daughter Sophia in 1391 and was able to enjoy his protection. When Vytautas captured the Smolensk principality in 1395, Vasily offered no resistance and accepted the Lithuanian annexation the following year. Vytautas allied himself with Tokhtamysh, but in 1399, their forces were defeated by Edigu in the Battle of the Vorskla River. In 1401, the people of Smolensk launched a revolt against Lithuanian rule and recalled their former prince, but Vasily stayed neutral and Vytautas reasserted his control three years later. However, Vytautas attempted to bring Pskov and Novgorod into the Lithuanian sphere of influence, and in 1406, Vytautas attacked Pskov. Vasily came to the aid of Pskov, leading to a border war between Lithuania and Moscow that lasted until Edigu's invasion two years later. In 1410, Vytautas joined Jogaila of Poland in defeating the Teutonic Knights in the Battle of Grunwald, and relations between Lithuania and Moscow resumed a more peaceful course, although the two continued to wrestle for influence in Pskov and Novgorod.

=== Vasily II ===
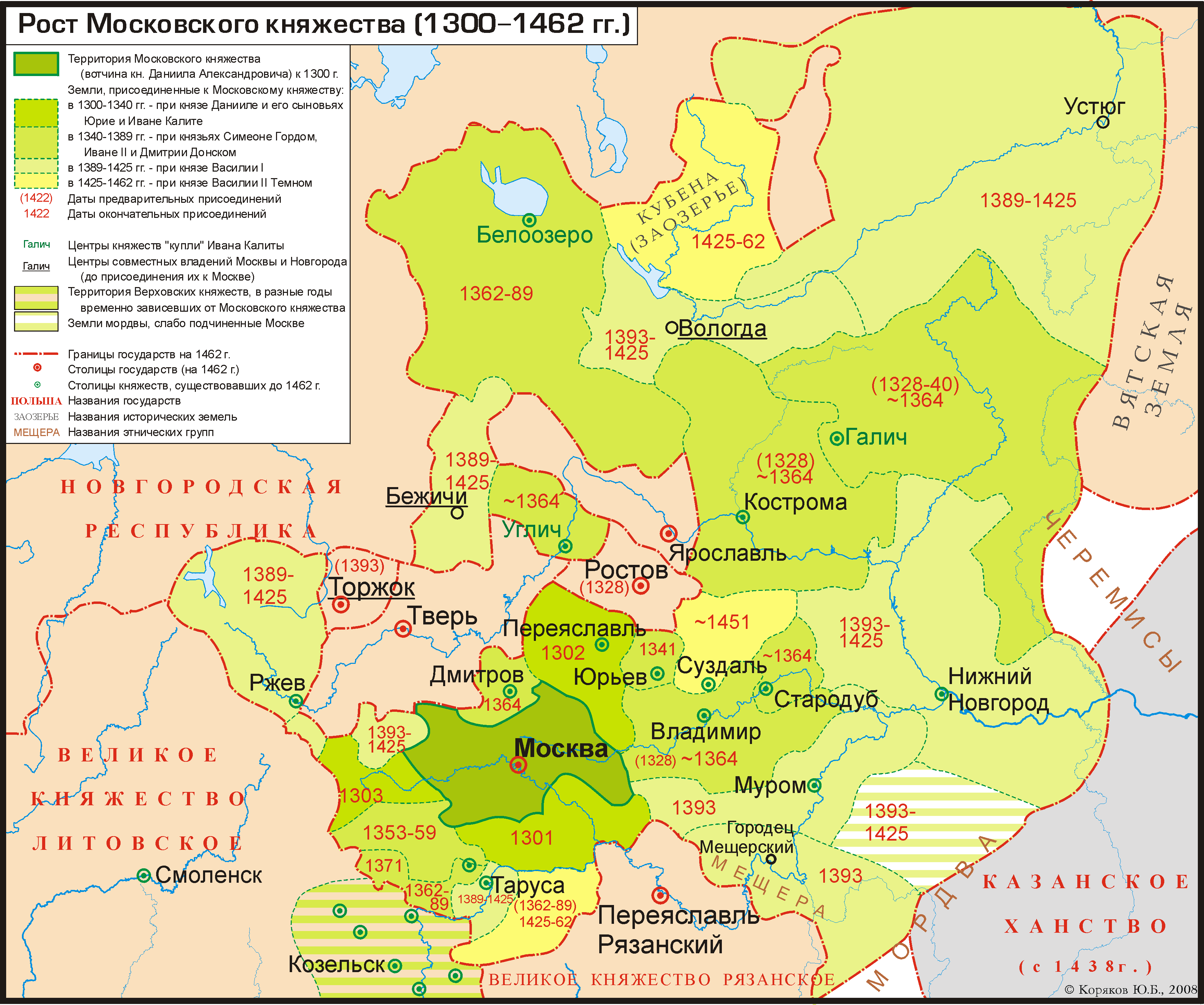
Growth of the Moscow principality from 1300 to 1462

Vasily II (r. 1425–1462) succeeded his father at the age of ten, and in the early years of his reign, tensions within Moscow led to a civil war. Yury of Galich showed signs of ambition during the reign of his older brother, Vasily I. He consolidated his control of his share of the family inheritance, building up a solid base in the prosperous region of Galich and creating a new capital, Zvenigorod. As soon as his brother died, Yury challenged the succession of his nephew. (Note: Yury based his claim on customary law. According to traditional succession practices, primacy passed not from father to son, but from the eldest brother to the second eldest brother and so on, before moving onto the next generation. For more than a century, though, the throne had passed from father to son. Yury also based his claim on Dmitry Donskoy's stipulation that the throne should pass to Yury on his death, who was writing at the time he had no son.) Yury gathered an army, but Metropolitan Photius intervened, urging him to submit. Yury refused, but the people of Galich pressured him after the metropolitan withheld his blessing of Yury's subjects. Yury recognized Vasily as the grand prince in 1428, but following the death of Vasily's key allies, Photius and Vytautas, Yury claimed the throne again in 1431 with the support of the population of Galich and other areas in the north, including Vyatka. Vasily sent his representatives to the khan, Ulugh Muhammad, and was able to receive the patent for the grand princely throne. However, in 1433, Yury seized Moscow and Vasily was forced to recognize him as the grand prince and accept Kolomna as an appanage.

Many nobles refused to recognize Yury as grand prince, and with his support dwindling, he left Moscow. Yury once again seized Moscow in 1434 and was able to secure recognition from powerful figures such as the prince of Mozhaysk, but he died soon after and the princes of Galich could no longer claim the throne on legal grounds. Vasily Kosoy, Yury's eldest son, attempted to remain on the throne of Moscow, but his younger brothers rejected his claim and made peace with Vasily II. He left Moscow, but continued to fight a war of attrition from his base. Vasily II captured him in 1436 and had him blinded, bringing the first phase of the civil war to an end and allowing Vasily to address a crisis in the church. The metropolitan seat had remained vacant following the death of Photius, and a council of Russian bishops nominated a local bishop, Jonah, to succeed him, but when he was finally able to go to Constantinople, the patriarch had already appointed the Greek bishop Isidore. Shortly after arriving in Moscow, Isidore left for the Council of Florence. Isidore returned in 1441 and brought news of the union, but Vasily ordered his arrest for having it signed. The seat remained vacant, and as no replacement had been sent from Constantinople, a council of Russian bishops finally chose Jonah as metropolitan in 1448, which amounted to a declaration of autocephaly by the Russian Orthodox Church.

The pressure of his rivals forced Ulugh Muhammad to take refuge in Belyov. Vasily attempted to drive him out, but failed, and the khan was free to raid the southern frontiers of Moscow for several years. In 1444, he moved to either Gorodets or Nizhny Novgorod, and launched raids on the southeastern territories of Moscow. Vasily mobilized against him, but slowly due to Lithuanian attacks, and in 1445, Vasily was taken prisoner by Ulugh Muhammad. He was later released and forced to pay a large ransom. Upon Vasily's return to Moscow, a number of nobles joined a plot in installing Yury's son Dmitry Shemyaka on the throne, and after Vasily left for a pilgrimage, Shemyaka's forces seized Moscow in 1446. As resistance to Shemyaka grew, especially from the clergy, Vasily moved to Tver and received the support of its prince, Boris, on the agreement that Vasily's son Ivan would be married to his daughter, Maria of Tver. Vasily's army entered Moscow the same year unopposed with the support of most court nobles and the ecclesiastical hierarchy, in addition to the prince of Tver. Shemyaka abandoned Moscow but still offered resistance until Galich was captured by Vasily in 1450.

=== Ivan III ===
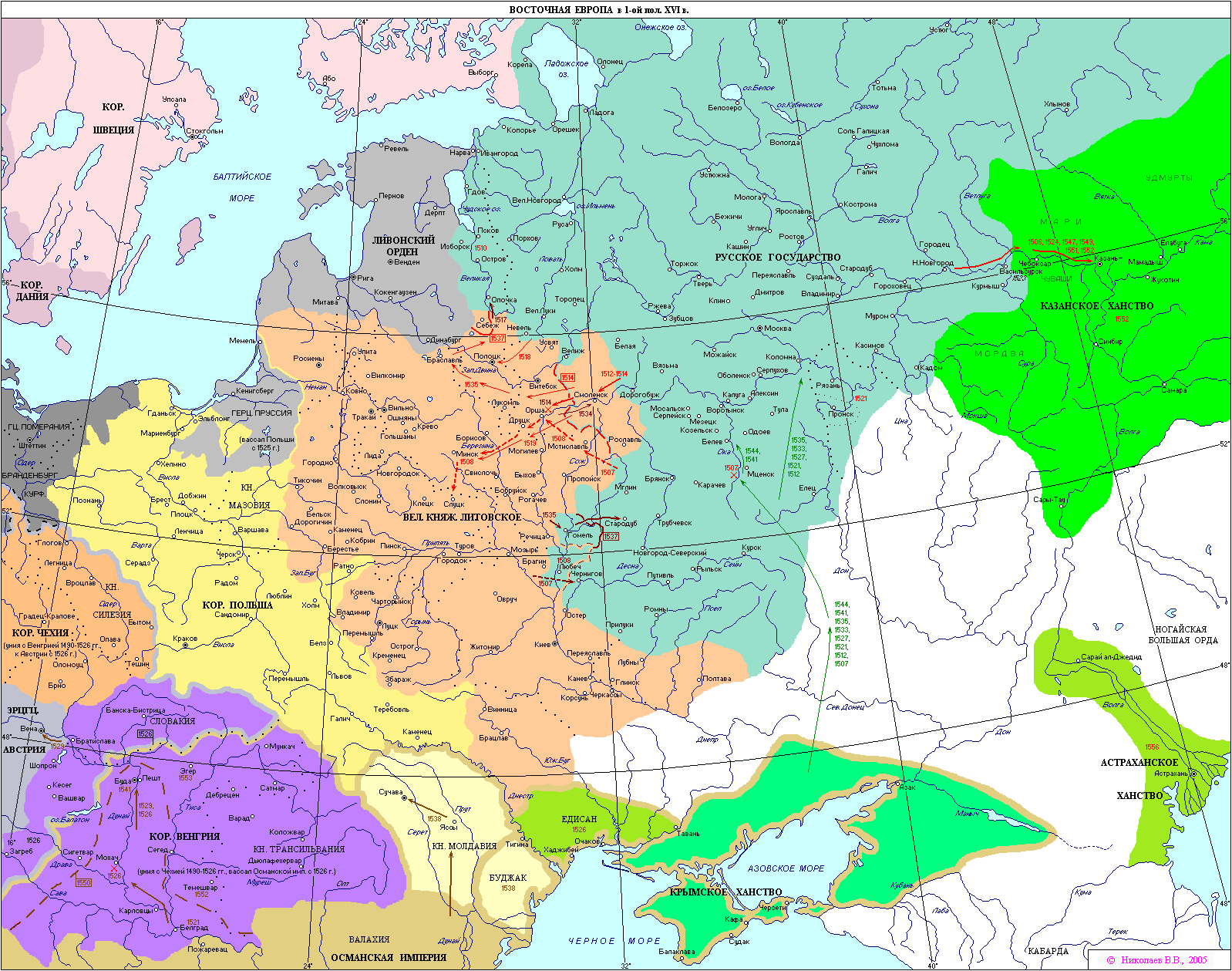
Eastern Europe at the time of Ivan III's death in 1505

Ivan III (r. 1462–1505) succeeded his father and his reign has been considered to mark the end of the appanage period and the beginning of a new period in Russian history known as Muscovite Russia. At the start of Ivan's reign, Moscow was already the political and religious center of Russia, but Ivan vastly expanded the domain of the grand prince with the gathering of the Russian lands. After Novgorod's boyar class turned to Lithuania for support, Ivan's army defeated the Novgorodian army in 1471, after which Ivan took an oath of allegiance from Novgorod, but left its system of government in place. After the Novgorodian authorities attempted to turn to Lithuania again, Ivan's army marched against the city in 1478 and the city surrendered. Ivan imposed his direct rule on the city and abolished its system of government. Tver offered even less resistance, and when Ivan launched a new campaign against Tver in 1485, its prince fled to Lithuania. Ivan incorporated other appanages into the grand principality, while other princes acknowledged him as their overlord. As a result, Ivan began to rule Russia as a unified monarchy.

Having consolidated the core of Russia under his rule, Ivan III became the first Muscovite ruler to use the title of tsar in his correspondence. He also adopted the title of sovereign of all Russia and competed with his powerful rival, the Grand Duchy of Lithuania, for control over the Upper Oka Principalities. Through the defections of some princes, border skirmishes, and the long inconclusive Russo-Lithuanian Wars that ended only in 1503, Ivan III was able to push westward, and the Moscow state tripled in size under his rule.

Ivan III also conducted a series of military campaigns against the principalities of Yugra, pushing eastward. Following the second campaign in 1483, Yugra was included in the title of the grand prince and the princes of Yugra swore allegiance to Ivan.

=== Vasily III ===
Vasily III (1479-1533), (r. 1505–1533) continued his father's policy of adding the remaining Russian territories. He annexed Pskov and Ryazan in 1510 and 1521, respectively. Smolensk, the last ethnographically Russian territory, remained under the control of Lithuania until a war with Lithuania led to Vasily capturing Smolensk in 1514. A peace treaty in 1522 confirmed Moscow's gains. For the next century, the border with Poland–Lithuania remained stable. Vasily also advanced the Russian border in the east and supported the pro-Russian party in the Khanate of Kazan. He was Grand Prince of Novgorod and Pskov and later the co-ruler of Ivan III; after his death he took the throne. He was known as the "last collector of the Russian land" for his annexation of Pskov (1510), Volotsk (1513), Ryazan (1521), and Novgorod-Seversk (1522).

Vasily married Solomonia Saburova but produced no children, leading him to marry Elena Glinskaya from the Glinsky family in 1526. She gave birth to Ivan in 1530, but Vasily's untimely death in 1533 led to Elena becoming regent and ruling with a handful of prominent boyars. Powerful boyar clans, including the Belskys, Glinskys, Obolenskys and Shuyskys, competed against each other for influence. Following Elena's death in 1538, the young Ivan married Anastasia Romanovna in 1547 and was crowned as not only the grand prince, but also the tsar of all Russia. He was buried in the Cathedral of the Archangel in the Moscow Kremlin.

== Government and politics ==
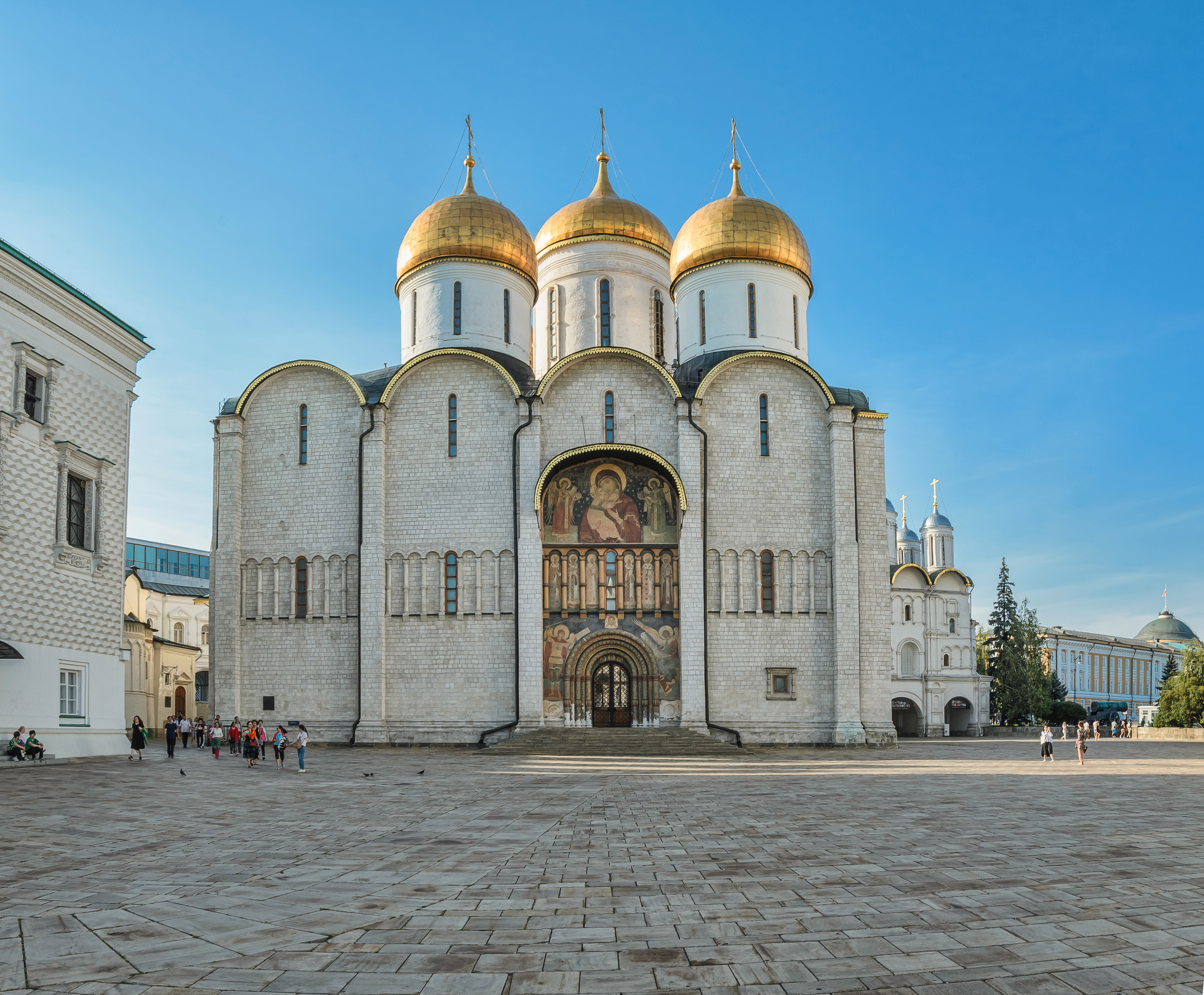
The Dormition Cathedral in the Moscow Kremlin

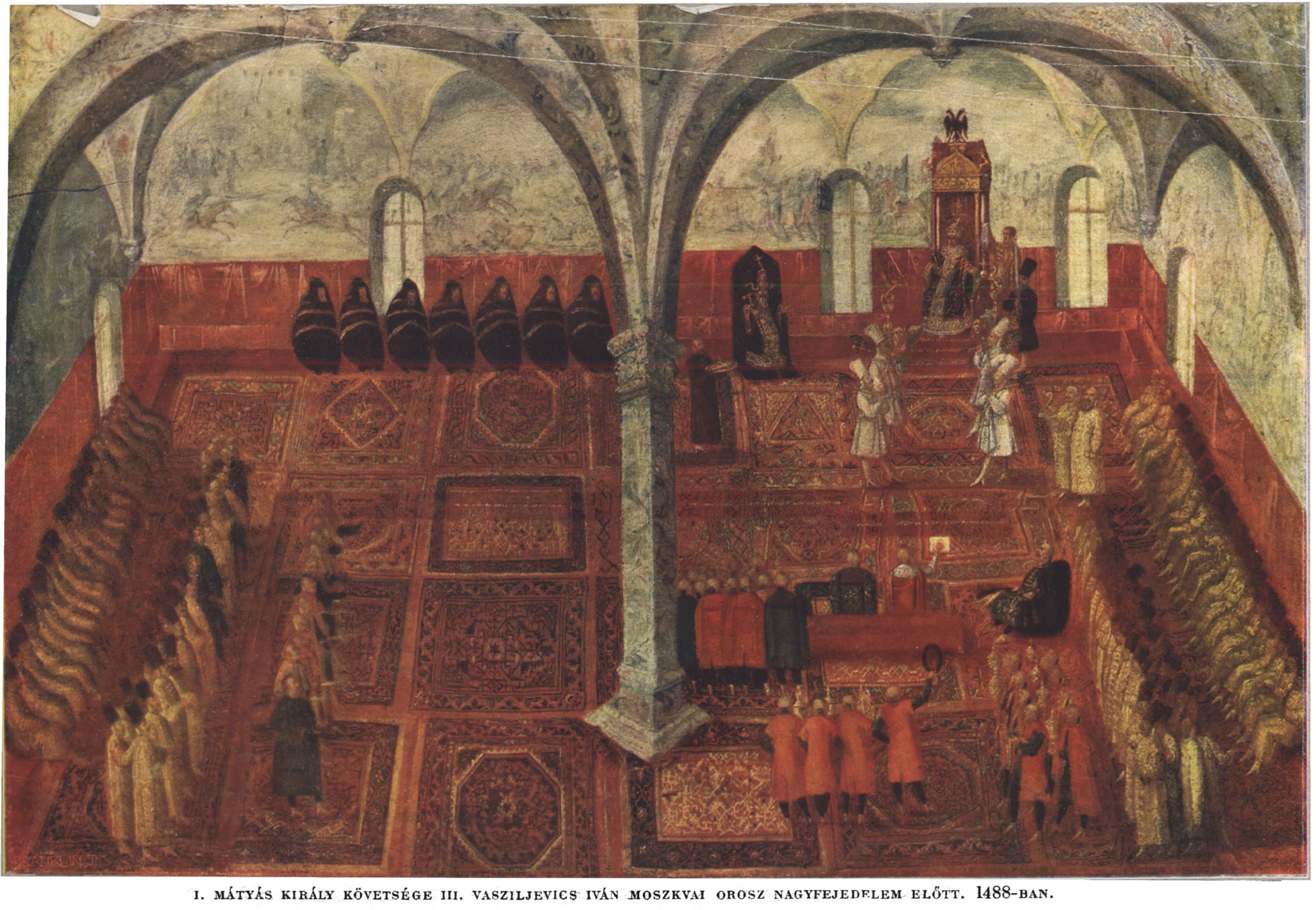
The 1488 Hungarian legation in the court of Ivan III, early 16th century

=== Political system ===
The unification of Russia gave rise to a new political system characterized by the dominance of the grand prince, who viewed the country as his personal patrimony. The historian Sergey Platonov wrote: "The authority of the Moscow princes took on the character of the authority of a lord of the manor over its land and people... The prince was not only the ruler of the country; he was also its owner". During the appanage period, princes and their retinues played a major administrative and social role in their principalities; however, with the rise of the grand principality of Moscow, the role of those princes were subordinated to the grand prince and the emerging state apparatus. Traditional institutions like the veche were abolished, and appanage princes were incorporated into the boyar class. As a result, they became increasingly part of the service class. Some historians have argued that a ruling class, which included the grand prince and leading boyars, governed the country by consultation and consensus-building. Nancy Shields Kollmann in particular called it the "façade of autocracy" and applied the term to later Muscovite history.

The boyar duma functioned as a body that consisted of the grand prince's chief advisors, diplomats, and administrators. The grand prince, at his discretion, solicited the opinion of the duma, or consulted with a group of advisors known as the blizhnaya duma ('close duma'). Unlike the regular duma, membership in the blizhnaya duma was not a matter of prestige. The boyar duma ultimately was dependent on the grand prince. The Sudebnik of 1497, officially the work of the grand prince, introduced uniform law and had the purpose of eliminating regional differences. The fiscal and legal base became more dependent on the monarch.

=== System of administration ===
The absorption of large amounts of territory led both Ivan III (r. 1462–1505) and Vasily III (r. 1505–1533) to strengthen the system of administration. Previously, the household of the grand prince managed what would be considered the affairs of the state, as well as the private and family business of the grand prince. To meet increasing demands, a small bureaucracy was established with state secretaries known as dyaki. The process of separating state affairs was slow, with most of the dyaki under Vasily III working in the management of the royal estates. The dyaki were also chosen based on skill; the historian Aleksandr Zimin identified more than 200 during the reigns of Ivan III and Vasily III. While provincial administrations managed their limited resources efficiently, domestic tariffs divided regions and local tradition was strong in many areas. For example, some continued to use their own systems for measuring land. The city of Novgorod also maintained its own distinct currency, while local political life continued the traditions of the republic in many ways.

Like previous rulers, both Ivan III and Vasily III chose nobles from their court to serve as governors in other towns or regions. These namestniki and volosteli had to maintain order and were tasked with organizing the defense of the territory. Ivan III and Vasily III often chose courtiers to serve as governors, but in times of civil strife, they sometimes sent a member of their inner circle to serve as governor, especially if the town or region was of strategic importance. Governors usually served for a maximum of one or two years before returning to Moscow. As the state's needs grew more complex, the office of gorodovoy prikazchik was established during the reign of Vasily III to handle some of the functions of the governor, such as tax collection and maintaining order. As the central government's authority was filtered through other institutions and jurisdictions, the royal administration had only limited control over large regions. Ivan IV tried different methods to increase his effective control over all regions, but it was not until the 17th century that this was resolved.

=== Taxation ===
The taxation system encompassed levies on land ownership and personal property, industrial and commercial production, service obligations, and judicial fees. Landowners were required to pay a tribute (dan), a "recension squirrel" (pischaya belka), and sometimes an additional "supplement" (primet). In urban areas, the dan was levied on taxable households. Other taxes included levies on specific goods, such as saddles (sedelnoye delo) and clothes (portnoye). Marriage was also taxed. Although most peasants remained free until the 16th century, those who married outside their community had to pay a "tax of foreign marriage" (vyvodnaya kunitsa), while those marrying within paid a "marriage tax" (ubrusnoye). The two primary commercial duties were forms of tolls: the myt, which dates to the Kievan period, and the tamga, a customs duty introduced under Mongol rule. The wealthiest merchants paid the tamga individually, while other merchants were assessed collectively through trade associations. Commoners were obligated to assist with the transport of goods (povozy) by providing horses and carts. They were also required to contribute directly to the postal service (yam) or to pay a special tax known as "postal money" (yamskiye dengi). War messengers held the right to food (kormy emliti), lodging (nochevati), and guides (prododniki) while traveling. In addition, the prince could send his fishing and game supervisors (lovchiye), falconers (sokolnichiye), and equerries (koniukhi) to oversee hunting grounds, rivers and lakes, with the right to enlist the local population.

In legal documents, there was no formal distinction between state property and the personal holdings and revenues of the prince. A privileged domain was called "whitened" (obelyonny) and exempt from regular taxation, while the "black lands" (chyornyye zemli) remained subject to standard fiscal obligations. A grant of privilege was issued in the form of a charter (zhalovannaya gramota), which could give either temporary (lgotnaya) or complete (tarkhannaya) fiscal exemption, and often also included judicial immunity (nesudimaya). These charters often contained special clauses maintaining the dues of the Russian Church. In the last quarter of the 15th century, Muscovite administrators began compiling detailed registers of landed property known as pistsovye knigi with information on the cadastre, population density, and weight of taxation. Land was measured not only by its size but also its quality. The privileges given to monasteries were greatly reduced under Ivan III, while under Vasily III, some of them received new lands and recovered certain privileges.

=== Appanages ===
Ivan I (r. 1325–1340) stressed the unity of the ruling house of Moscow and its lands, and as a result, he ensured that the family's lands remained the collective property of all members while giving each one of his heirs a share of the inheritance. Simeon (r. 1340–1353) made a treaty with his brothers, in which the younger members of the house recognized Simeon as their leader and were obligated to follow him in his military campaigns in exchange for Simeon consulting his brothers on important state affairs. As a result, each brother had inviolable possession of his appanage, which he could administer autonomously and pass on to his direct heir.

Due to the increasing fragmentation of Moscow, the ruling house under Dmitry Donskoy (r. 1359–1389) distinguished between patrimonial possessions of the entire family, which could be divided into appanages held as a temporary trust, and patrimonial possessions known as votchiny that belonged to individual members or branches. In the treaties between Dmitry and his cousin Vladimir of Serpukhov, the former recognized the latter's right to hold the lands inherited from his father. At this point, the Moscow principality consisted of two autonomous subdivisions with two capitals, while the principality remained a single unit of which Dmitry was the head.

In Vasily II's final years (r. 1425–1462), only the appanage principality of Vereya remained. In his will, Vasily II created four more appanages for his younger sons. Ivan III (r. 1462–1505) sought to consolidate the lands of his younger brothers into his domain whenever possible. He insisted that any appanage prince who died would have his appanage reverted to the crown in its entirety. In Ivan III's final years, only one of the original five appanage principalities remained. In his will, he created four new appanages for all of his younger sons, and as a result, his eldest son Vasily III (r. 1505–1533) faced five appanage princes, one of whom was his cousin, given Volok Lamsky. Vasily III prevented his younger brothers from marrying until he had sons of his own, and so by the time of his death, only one appanage principality remained.

In the 16th century, appanage princes held significant power over their subjects, including the right to collect taxes and administer low justice. They also inherited a tradition of family solidarity, meaning the grand prince was expected to consult them on matters of war and peace. When an appanage prince died, the survivors were typically entitled to inherit a share of the deceased's lands. Although some historians have viewed them as opponents to the power of the grand prince, the appanages were created by him, and by the late 15th century, many of these appanage principalities reverted to the crown upon the prince's death, despite being theoretically held in hereditary tenure. Appanage princes also had their own courts and commanded their own armies, and as such, were expected to contribute to the defense of the country. However, the court and the army of the grand prince was significantly larger.

== Foreign relations ==
=== Golden Horde ===
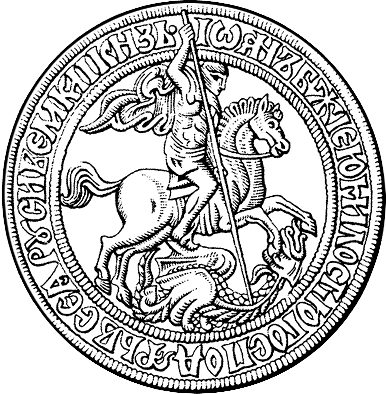
Obverse of Ivan III's seal, later identified as Saint George slaying the dragon, 1497.

The Mongols introduced a strict system of taxation. Following the Mongol conquest, the khan of the Golden Horde regularly sent tax collectors known as darughachi. The Russian Church was granted a full exemption in 1267 as part of the Mongol policy of religious tolerance. Mengu-Timur also determined that Russian peasants would obey the nobles and religious leaders, and thus he used the tarkhan system to co-opt the nobility and win their support. These grants were translated from Mongol to Old Russian from the late 14th or early 15th century. By the late 13th or early 14th century, collection of the tribute was delegated to the princes themselves under the supervision of the grand prince of Vladimir, a title that was obtained by Ivan I and kept by his successors.

Relations between Moscow and the Golden Horde varied at times. In the last two decades of the 13th century, Moscow gained the support of one of the rivaling Mongol statesmen, Nogai, against the principalities that were oriented towards the khan. After the restoration of unity in the Golden Horde in the early 14th century, Moscow generally enjoyed the favor of the khan until 1317 and 1322–1327. For the following three decades, when relations between the two parties improved, Moscow was able to achieve sufficient economic and political potential. Further attempts to deprive its rulers of the status of grand prince were unsuccessful after the Horde sank into internecine war and proved to be fruitless during the reign of a relatively powerful khan such as Mamai, whereas Tokhtamysh had no other choice but to recognize the supremacy of Moscow over the Russian principalities. The traditional divide and conquer strategy of the Mongols failed, and the following period is characterized by a lack of support from the Horde.

Although Moscow recognized the khan as its suzerain in the early years of the "Tatar yoke", despite certain acts of resistance and disobedience, it refused to acknowledge the khan's suzerainty in 1374–1380, 1396–1411, 1414–1416 and 1417–1419, even despite the growing power of the Golden Horde. The power of the Horde over Moscow was greatly limited during the reign of Dmitry Donskoy, who gained recognition of the grand principality of Vladimir as a hereditary possession of the princes of Moscow; while the Horde continued to collect tribute, it could no longer have a serious impact on the internal structure of Russia. During the reigns of Vasily II and Ivan III, the Moscow grand principality adopted the ideology of an Orthodox tsardom after the fall of Constantinople, which was incompatible with the recognition of suzerainty of the khan, and as a result, the grand prince began to declare the independence of Moscow in diplomatic relations with other countries. This process was complete during the reign of Ivan III.

== Religion ==
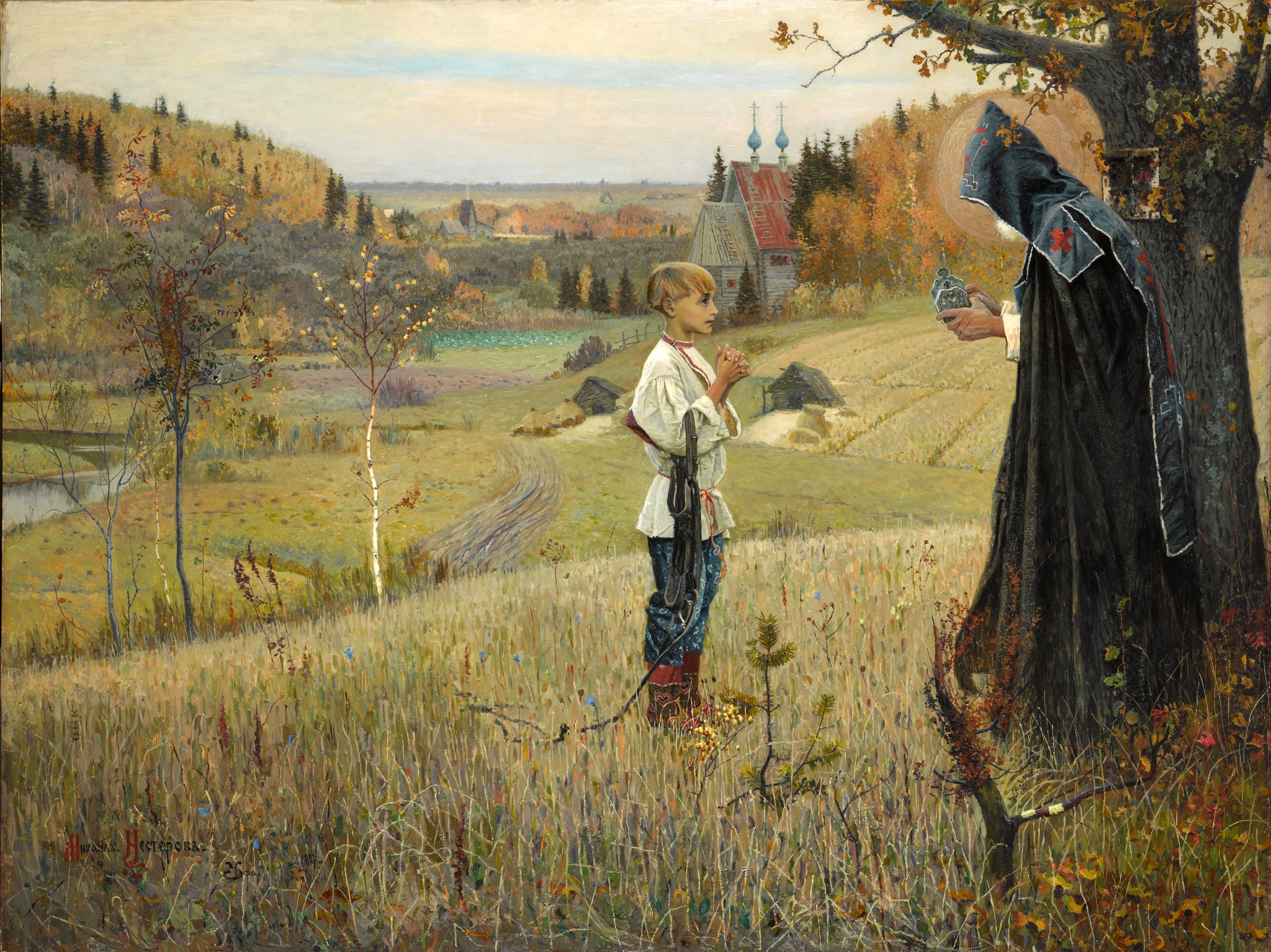
The Vision to the Youth Bartholomew, painting by Mikhail Nesterov, 1889–1890

In the centuries following the Mongol conquest, there was a revival and flourishing of monasticism, which became the most significant development in the life of the Russian Church. Between the 14th and 16th centuries, monasticism spread in an unprecedented manner. One estimate suggests around 250 cenobitic monasteries and convents were founded during this period, many in remote corners of the Muscovite realm. Sergius of Radonezh was both the driving force and the embodiment of the monastic revival. Around 1354, he adopted a monastic rule that turned his followers into a fully communal, cenobitic organization, later known as the Trinity Lavra of St. Sergius. The teachings of Sergius inspired many of his followers to found their own communities. The Andronikov, Simonov and Chudov Monasteries were founded in Moscow and its environs, while others were founded in remote areas of the Russian North, such as the Kirillo-Belozersky Monastery near Beloozero and the Solovetsky Monastery on the island of Solovetsky in the White Sea.

This monastic revival inspired the church to renew its missionary work and continue converting all peoples, whether Slavic or not, to Orthodox Christianity. Towards the end of the 14th century, Stephen of Perm moved into the territory of the Komi peoples in the northeastern corner of European Russia, where his teachings and acts of charity won him many converts. He invented the Permic script and began translating scriptures and other writings; his efforts have helped the Komi remain Orthodox to this day. Following the death of Sergius, the Trinity Lavra acquired huge estates and became extremely influential. By the end of the 16th century, it owned a total of 240,000 hectares (590,000 acres) of arable land. The Muscovite government gradually transformed the monasteries into fortresses. Even those far from the frontiers were heavily fortified, such as the Trinity Lavra, as they were intended to serve as places of refuge and military garrisons. The monastic communities came to socially dominate entire regions of the country, with only larger towns rivaling them as centers of social activity.

Although Russian heretics were few in number, their intelligence made them disproportionately influential. At the time of Moscow's annexation of Novgorod, a new movement emerged and was given the pejorative label of Judaizers. According to Joseph Volotsky, in 1471, a Jew arrived in Novgorod and began converting some of the locals to Judaism. Most modern scholars have rejected this version of events, but it is known that there was a struggle between Archbishop Gennady of Novgorod and some of the local priests and their followers. This heresy later spread to the court of Ivan III (r. 1462–1505) in the mid-1480s after diplomat Fyodor Kuritsyn returned from Hungary. Like the strigolniki before them, the Judaizers rejected the authority of the hierarchy and embraced iconoclasm. Ivan refused to crush them until 1504, when a church council condemned the remaining Judaizers as heretics and Ivan sent them to the stake.

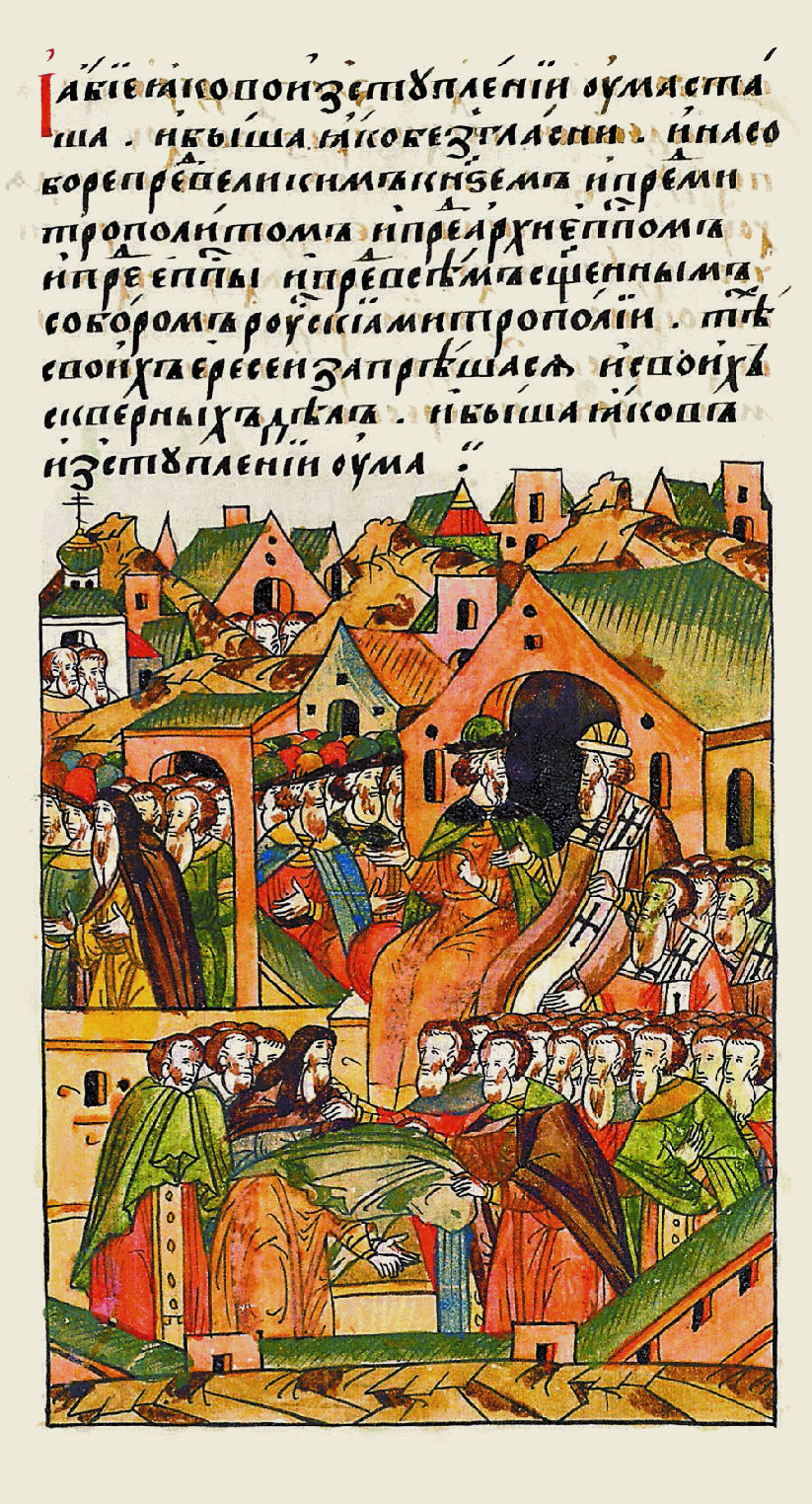
The sobor (church council) of 1490, miniature from the Illustrated Chronicle of Ivan the Terrible

During the reign of Ivan III, two factions within the Russian Church contended for influence. Joseph Volotsky led the faction that supported the right of monasteries to own land, while the non-possessors, led by Nil Sorsky, opposed monastic landholding. Ivan viewed the pomestye system as an ideal way to provide for the noble cavalrymen who served in the army, but the vast landholdings of the church prevented him from extending this system to the rest of his realm. As a result, the non-possessors were natural allies of Ivan. In the sobor (church council) of 1503, which was called to deal with the issues of church discipline, a compromise was reached whereby church lands would not be systematically confiscated; however, some scholars have argued that there is a lack of concrete evidence that this sobor discussed monastic landholding. Given that the government held significant amounts of crown land in the central regions, the government felt little pressure to confiscate monastic lands.

The fall of Constantinople in 1453 was viewed by the Russians as divine punishment for apostasy, with subsequent writings referring to Vasily II (r. 1425–1462) as "the God-chosen... God-crowned tsar of Orthodoxy and of all Russia". The unilateral decision of Vasily II and the Russian bishops to install Jonah as metropolitan in 1448 was later justified by arguing that the fall of the Byzantine Empire had left the Orthodox world without an emperor, while the patriarch was incapacitated. This decision allowed for the creation of a separate metropolitanate in Lithuania during the reign of Casimir IV Jagiellon, with Jonah being unable to assert his authority there. Ivan III often presented himself as the Orthodox emperor, or tsar, in his diplomatic correspondence, and so the campaign to gain recognition as equals from the Habsburg emperors was a high priority. In the year 1492 (AM 7000), Metropolitan Zosimus speculated on Russia's role in the world and was thus the first to call Moscow an imperial city. Archbishop Gennady of Novgorod commissioned a complete Slavonic translation of the Bible, known as Gennady's Bible, which led to the creation of a byproduct: a composition known as The Legend of the White Cowl, which elaborated on the doctrine of the transfer of empire.

== Society ==
The vast majority of the population were peasants. The peasants' primary allegiance was to the commune. Although little information exists on the structure of peasant communes before the 16th century, historians believe that, by that time, the commune already had a very long history and deep roots. The peasants of either a district, village or several hamlets chose elders who would represent them through the commune. In the 15th and 16th centuries, the Muscovite government viewed the commune as a useful tool in governing the realm. For instance, the commune's members were collectively responsible for paying taxes, and therefore if one household failed to pay its share, then the others had to pay what was owed. Therefore, administrative ordinances recognized the traditional functions of the commune and used them to suit the needs of officials.

Over the centuries, peasant land increasingly passed into the hands of nobles and monasteries. Although the peasants continued to farm the land, they were now required to pay dues to the lord. These dues sometimes included the peasants giving their lord a small amount of money and specified amounts of rye, oats, butter, and other products. In other cases, peasants were obligated to provide a range of services, such as cultivating the fields of monks or baking their bread. By the end of the 15th century, monetary payments had become a regular part of these obligations. Throughout the 16th century, these demands appear to have risen. The peasants retained considerable leverage, such as the ability to leave their lord's manor. From the mid-15th century, Muscovite law also specified that peasants could legally move during the two weeks surrounding George's Day in Autumn, provided that they had fulfilled their obligations and settled any debt. By the end of the 15th century, the government had imposed a wide range of demands, including paying taxes, fees, and the provision of goods and services.

The other main class was the nobility. Their primary role was to serve as warriors, and as a result, nobles made up the retinue of ruling princes and armies. At the beginning of the 14th century, like other ruling princes, the prince of Moscow had his own force of military retainers. The grand prince of Vladimir was the suzerain of all the princes, and so in emergencies, he could summon the princes and their warriors to defend the country. In practice, the prince could choose whether to participate in such campaigns. As the Muscovite prince annexed other principalities, he brought the nobles there into his service. Some came to Moscow to serve in his court, while others were allowed to serve from their ancestral homeland. By the end of the 15th century, as the grand prince of Moscow became the undisputed leader of the nation, he forbade the right of departure and expected warriors to appear when summoned. Despite most nobles owning land in absolute tenure, known as votchiny, the grand prince had no qualms about confiscating them for acts of disloyalty.

During the reign of Ivan III (r. 1462–1505), the basic structure of the warrior nobility became more defined. At the top were the boyars as they commanded the armies and served as advisors. Below them was an equally small group of families whose members served as governors of various provinces and in other roles, including in battle. Beneath them were lesser members of the entourage, who guarded the grand prince and formed the core of his army. The majority of the warrior nobility lived on their estates and would appear when summoned, alongside the other nobles from their region. At the same time, the Muscovite army became a highly effective fighting force, drawing on centuries of experience battling mounted warriors from the steppe. As a result, Russian warriors prioritized speed and mobility, opting for light chain mail and primarily using bows and swords.

== Economy ==
In the 15th century, following the disintegration of the Golden Horde, Muscovite merchants began trading directly with Crimea, including with the Genoese in Caffa. A distinct merchant group known as the gosti-surozhane emerged, likely composed of native Russians, who specialized in trading with Crimea. Merchants from abroad, including Armenians and Genoese, came to Moscow via Crimea. Around the same time, the city of Kazan replaced Bolghar as the focal point of trade on the river. The annual fair in Kazan attracted many merchants from abroad, including Russians. The Nogai Horde also played an important role in the Muscovite economy by supplying the army with horses. By the 16th century, 20,000 horses were driven to markets in Moscow each year.

Since early times, the city of Novgorod served as the intermediary between other Russian cities and northwestern Europe. Furs were the main commodity for export and Novgorod worked to control the supply of the highest quality furs. By the 15th century, the commercial power of the Hanseatic League had waned, and in 1494, Ivan III ordered the closure of the Hanseatic kontor in Novgorod, known as the Peterhof. Ivan sought to open as many outlets for foreign trade as possible, which included his fortress of Ivangorod in the Baltic. Although the kontor in Novgorod was briefly re-opened in 1514, the Hanseatic League never regained its former monopoly, while Russia's Baltic trade continued with increased flexibility.

Early in their history, Russian towns often served as the capital of an independent principality. During the period of centralization, these towns became regional centers of the royal administration. Other towns close to the frontiers primarily served as military outposts. Many townsmen were artisans who worked with metal, wood, leather and other materials to produce a variety of goods. These were often made for local consumption as Russian artisans had little contact with wider markets. During times of war, some specialized in producing chain mail, cannons or handguns. The main products in long-range internal trade were regional specialties from the countryside, such as fish and salt.

== Culture ==
Muscovite Russia was culturally influenced by Slavic and Byzantine cultural elements. In Muscovite Russia, supernaturalism was a fundamental part of daily life.

=== Art and architecture ===
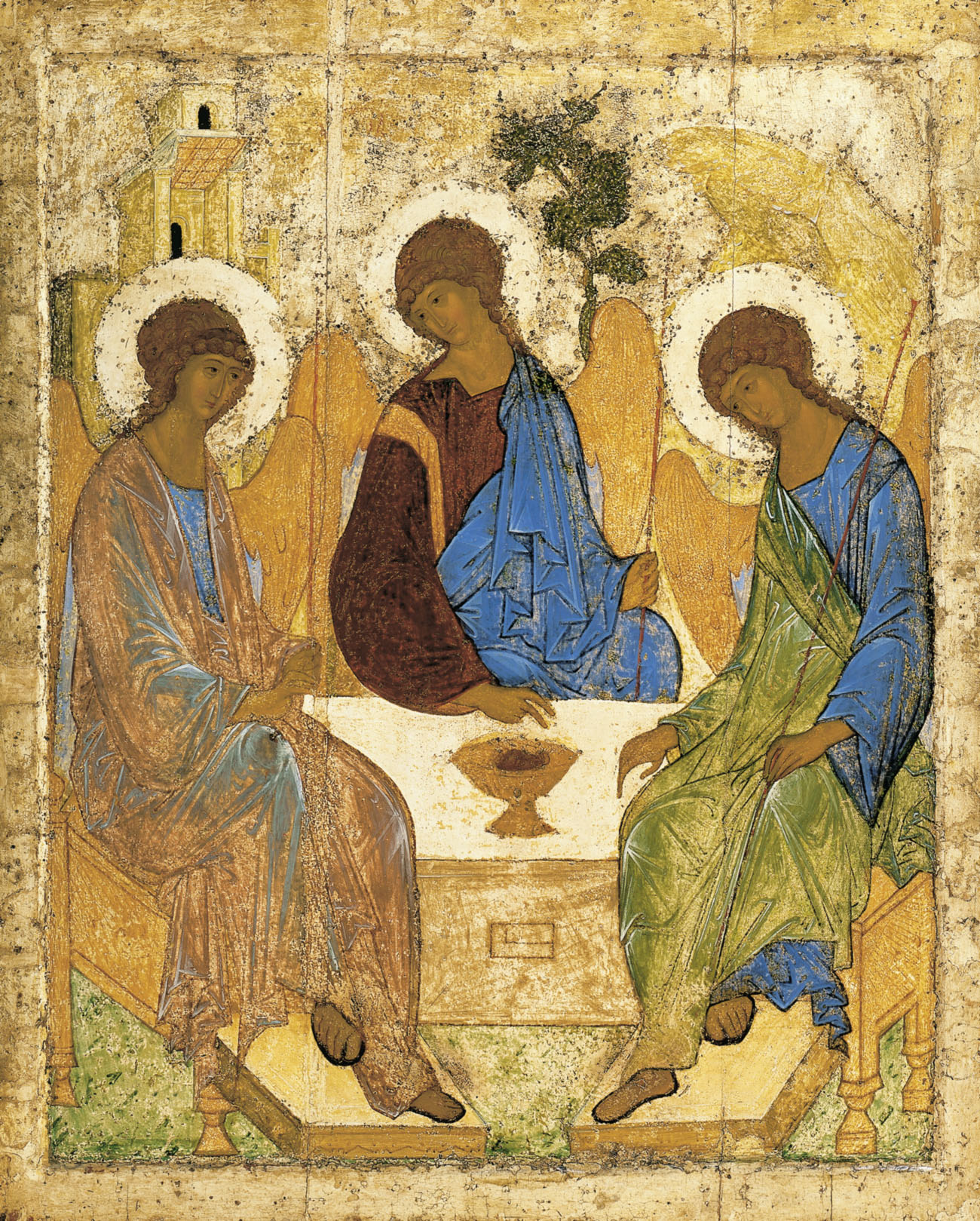
The Trinity, icon by Andrei Rublev, early 15th century

A distinct school of icon painting was formed in Moscow in the second half of the 14th century, and would be led by Andrei Rublev, one of the most celebrated Russian icon painters. Among his most notable works is The Trinity, which dates to the early 15th century. The first original Russian school, the Suzdal school, was merged with the Moscow school in the early 15th century. Igor Grabar said it could be distinguished by "a general tone, which is always cool, silvery, in contrast to Novgorodian painting which inevitably tends towards the warm, the yellowish, the golden". Dionisius continued the traditions of Andrei Rublev and the Moscow school at the turn of the 16th century. The art of the miniature in illuminated manuscripts also continued to develop in Moscow, with manuscripts like the Khitrovo Gospels containing rich illustrations.

The Moscow architectural school, which extended to the smaller principalities that were incorporated, evolved steadily throughout the 15th century. In smaller towns, a more distinct type of church emerged, one that returned to the Vladimir school. A group of cathedrals built at the end of the 14th century and the beginning of the 15th century exemplifies the "early Moscow style" that preceded the arrival of Renaissance craftsmen. These include the Cathedral of the Dormition in Zvenigorod (1396–1398), the Cathedral of the Nativity of the Virgin in the Savvino-Storozhevsky Monastery (1405–1408), and the Cathedral of the Trinity in the Trinity Lavra of St. Sergius (c. 1422). Scholars of Moscow's architectural history have emphasized that the traditions of a number of Russian principalities were integrated into a unified system in the early 15th century. The Cathedral of the Savior in the Andronikov Monastery (1425–1427) is often cited as the main example of this.

The late 15th century marked a significant period for masonry architecture, with many new masonry buildings appearing in the Moscow Kremlin and in other parts of Moscow. Eight new churches were built within the Kremlin itself. Brick began to replace the previously used limestone ("white stone"), likely under the influence of brick architecture in northern Germany's coastal towns, with which Novgorod had trade connections. It is believed that a group of Novgorodian masters worked in Moscow and introduced new techniques. Following the end of Mongol suzerainty, Ivan III transformed Russian architectural style after contacts with Italian cities were restored, introducing new features that were preserved throughout the following centuries. Italian Renaissance masters worked in Russia from 1475 to 1539. The career of Aristotele Fioravanti is considered to be evidence that Moscow attracted leading Italian masters. The Dormition Cathedral in the Kremlin (1475–1479) reflects the spirit of early Vladimir and Fioravanti used the Dormition Cathedral in Vladimir, a symbol of the center of the Russian Church, as his model while introducing new influences at the same time.

=== Literature ===
In the 14th century, South Slavic clerks revised the Church Slavonic texts in scriptures and liturgies to align them more closely to the original Greek texts; this variation of Church Slavonic became the literary language of Muscovite Russia. Although Church Slavonic was used as the literary language, princely administrative offices used a more vernacularized form of writing. In the 15th century, Bulgarian and Serbian clerics who came to Russia following the Ottoman conquests of their countries brought with them a new style of writing. This new style was chiefly expressed in hagiography, characterized by a disregard for concrete detail and a preference for generalization of the subject. The Life of St. Stephen of Perm by Epiphanius the Wise became the type of such writings for the following centuries. Due to South Slavic influence, a more formal and rigid standard of Church Slavonic replaced the strongly vernacularized language of the 13th and 14th centuries.

Metropolitan Cyprian (d. 1406) played a significant role in influencing the rise of Moscow as the new center of Russian culture. He actively contributed to promoting the spread of hesychast theology in Russia by translating texts that supported its teachings. He also worked to align Russian liturgical practices more closely with those of Byzantine tradition. In the years leading up to his death, Cyprian contributed to the creation of the first comprehensive Moscow chronicle, which was completed in 1408. As a writer, his notable works include two versions of the Life of Metropolitan Peter. These versions were based on an earlier account commissioned by Ivan I of Moscow in 1327 to commemorate Metropolitan Peter's relocation of the seat of the church from Vladimir to Moscow. The expanded version is widely considered to be the first example in old Russian hagiography of a new hagiographical style.

After the defeat of the Tatars in the Battle of Kulikovo, heroic accounts of the battle were written with considerable artistry, including The Tale of the Battle with Mamai and Zadonshchina. The latter crafted a proto-national myth about the need for unification against foreign enemies: "Let us lay down our lives for the Russian land and the Christian faith". In the Muscovite period, there was a local tradition of historical narratives focused on isolated military events, one example being The Story of the Taking of Pskov (1510), which D. S. Mirsky referred to as "one of the most beautiful 'short stories' of Old Russia".

The fall of Constantinople in 1453 and the independence of the Russian Church led to the development of the idea that the grand princes of Moscow, or tsars, were the legitimate heirs of the Byzantine Empire, as expressed in several pseudo-historical works from the reigns of Ivan III and Vasily III. The Tale on the Taking of Tsargrad by Nestor Iskander was one of the most popular, with its final part mentioning a Greek legend of a "fair people" (rusy rod), which was later interpreted to mean the Russians (russky rod), being destined to free Constantinople. A related idea is expressed in the Epistle on the Crown of Monomakh and The Tale of the Princes of Vladimir, which trace the genealogy of the grand princes back to the Roman emperor Augustus. After Ivan IV was crowned as tsar in 1547, official literature became marked by an encyclopedic approach, reflecting the political centralization and unification of the country.

== See also ==
- List of wars involving the Principality of Moscow

== Bibliography ==
- Arakcheev, V. (1 September 2022). "Instruments for Consolidation of the Russian State in the Second Half of the Fifteenth Century: Ficus, Service, and the Court". Herald of the Russian Academy of Sciences. 92 (5): S395–S406. doi:10.1134/S101933162211003X. ISSN 1555-6492.
- Boguslavsky, Vladimir V.; Kuksina, Elena I. (2001). "Московское великое княжество" [Grand Principality of Moscow]. Славянская энциклопедия. Киевская Русь — Московия. Т. 1: А–М (in Russian). Vol. 1. Moskva: ОЛМА Медиа Групп. pp. 761–762. ISBN 9785224022502.
- Bushkovitch, Paul (5 December 2011). A Concise History of Russia. Cambridge University Press. ISBN 978-1-139-50444-7.
- Bushkovitch, Paul (18 March 2021). Succession to the Throne in Early Modern Russia: The Transfer of Power 1450–1725. Cambridge University Press. ISBN 978-1-108-47934-9.
- Channon, John; Hudson, Robert (1995). The Penguin Historical Atlas of Russia. Penguin. ISBN 978-0-14-051326-4.
- Crummey, Robert O. (6 June 2014) [1987]. The Formation of Muscovy 1300–1613. Routledge. ISBN 978-1-317-87200-9.
- de Madariaga, Isabel (1997). "Tsar into Emperor: the title of Peter the Great". In Oresko, R.; Gibbs, G. C.; Scott, H. M. (eds.). Royal and Republican Sovereignty in Early Modern Europe: Essays in Memory of Ragnhild Hatton. Cambridge: Cambridge University Press. ISBN 9780521419109.
- Dukes, Paul (1998). A History of Russia: Medieval, Modern, Contemporary, C. 882–1996. Duke University Press. ISBN 978-0-8223-2096-8.
- Favereau, Marie (20 April 2021). The Horde: How the Mongols Changed the World. Harvard University Press. ISBN 978-0-674-24421-4.
- Favereau, Marie; Pochekaev, Roman Yu. (2023). "The Golden Horde, c. 1260–1502". The Cambridge History of the Mongol Empire. Cambridge University Press. pp. 243–318. ISBN 978-1-107-11648-1.
- Feldbrugge, Ferdinand J. M. (2 October 2017). A History of Russian Law: From Ancient Times to the Council Code (Ulozhenie) of Tsar Aleksei Mikhailovich of 1649. BRILL. ISBN 978-90-04-35214-8.
- Fennell, John L. I. (14 January 2014) [1995]. A History of the Russian Church to 1488. Routledge. ISBN 978-1-317-89720-0.
- Fennell, John L. I. (15 November 2023) [1968]. The Emergence of Moscow, 1304–1359. University of California Press. ISBN 978-0-520-34759-5.
- Galeotti, Mark (5 November 2024). Forged in War: A Military History of Russia from Its Beginnings to Today. Bloomsbury USA. ISBN 978-1-4728-6251-8.
- Gavrilkin, Konstantin (3 February 2014). McGuckin, John Anthony (ed.). The Concise Encyclopedia of Orthodox Christianity. John Wiley & Sons. pp. 401–411. ISBN 978-1-118-75933-2.
- Glaser, Marina; Krivushin, Ivan (30 April 2021). Moscow's Evolution as a Political Space: From Yuri Dolgorukiy to Sergei Sobyanin. Palgrave Macmillan. doi:10.1007/978-3-030-68673-4. ISBN 978-3-030-68673-4.
- Gonneau, Pierre (30 November 2022). "Russia from the Mongol invasion to the death of Ivan the Terrible (1242–1584)". In Menjot, Denis; Caesar, Mathieu; Garnier, Florent; Pijuan, Pere Verdés (eds.). The Routledge Handbook of Public Taxation in Medieval Europe. Taylor & Francis. pp. 372–388. doi:10.4324/9781003023838-19. ISBN 978-1-000-73636-6.
- Gorsky, Anton A. (2000). Москва и Орда [Moscow and the Horde] (in Russian). Moskva: Nauka. ISBN 978-5-02-010202-6. Archived from the original on 16 July 2019.
- Gorsky, Anton A. (2025). "Куликовская битва в контексте отношений Руси и Орды во второй половине XIV в. к 645-летию битвы на Куликовом поле" [The battle of Kulikovo in the context of relations between Rus' and the Horde in the second half of the 14th century on the 645th anniversary of the battle on Kulikovo field]. Herald of the Russian Academy of Sciences (in Russian). 95 (8): 82–87. doi:10.7868/S3034520025080084. ISSN 3034-5200. 305411.
- Halperin, Charles J. (1987). Russia and the Golden Horde: The Mongol Impact on Medieval Russian History. Indiana University. ISBN 9781850430575. (e-book).
- Martin, Janet (2007). Medieval Russia: 980–1584. Second Edition. E-book. Cambridge: Cambridge University Press. ISBN 978-0-511-36800-4.
- Hellberg-Hirn, Elena (4 January 2019). Soil and Soul: The Symbolic World of Russianness. Routledge. ISBN 978-0-429-64041-4.
- Khoroshkevich, A. L. (1976). "Россия и Московия: Из истории политико-географической терминологии" [Russia and Muscovy: from the history of politico-geographic terminology]. Acta Baltico-Slavica (in Russian). X: 47–57.
- Khoroshkevich, A. L. (2003). Россия в системе международных отношений середины XVI века [Russia in the system of international relations of the mid-16th century] (in Russian). Moscow: Древлехранилище. ISBN 5-93646-053-3.
- Khoroshkevich, A. L. (2005). "Россия или Московия?" [Russia or Muscovy?]. Rodina. No. 11. pp. 53–57.
- Kloss, Boris (2012). О происхождении названия "Россия" [About the origin of the name "Russia"] (in Russian). Moskva: ИД ЯСК. ISBN 978-5-9551-0527-7.
- Kristof, Ladis K. D. (20 May 2016). "The Russian Image of Russia: An Applied Study in Geopolitical Methodology". In Fisher, Charles A. (ed.). Essays in Political Geography (Routledge Library Editions: Political Geography). Routledge. ISBN 978-1-317-60528-7.
- Krom, Mikhail M. (2004). "Ivan III". In Millar, James R. (ed.). Encyclopedia of Russian History. Macmillan Reference USA. pp. 687–689. ISBN 978-0-02-865693-9.
- Kuchkin, Vladimir A. (1995). "Первый московский князь Даниил Александрович" [The first prince of Moscow, Daniil Aleksandrovich]. Отечественная история (in Russian) (1): 93–107. ISSN 0869-5687.
- Kuchkin, Vladimir A. (2013). "Московское великое княжество" [Grand Principality of Moscow]. In Kravets, S. L. (ed.). Большая российская энциклопедия. Том 21: Монголы — Наноматериалы (in Russian). Большая российская энциклопедия. pp. 308–310. ISBN 978-5-85270-355-2. Archived from the original on 20 May 2026.
- Martin, Russell (12 June 2019). "Anticipatory Association of the Heir in Early Modern Russia: Primogeniture and Succession in Russia's Ruling Dynasties". In Woodacre, Elena (ed.). The Routledge History of Monarchy. Routledge. pp. 420–442. ISBN 978-1-351-78730-7.
- Meyendorff, John (24 June 2010). Byzantium and the Rise of Russia: A Study of Byzantino-Russian Relations in the Fourteenth Century. Cambridge University Press. ISBN 978-0-521-13533-7.
- Mirsky, D. S. (1999). A History of Russian Literature from Its Beginnings to 1900. Northwestern University Press. ISBN 978-0-8101-1679-5.
- Moser, Charles (30 April 1992). The Cambridge History of Russian Literature. Cambridge University Press. ISBN 978-0-521-42567-4.
- Moss, Walter G. (1 July 2003). A History of Russia Volume 1: To 1917. Anthem Press. ISBN 978-1-84331-023-5.
- Mukherjee, Rila (23 August 2025). Europe in the World from 1350 to 1650. Springer Nature. doi:10.1007/978-981-96-8540-0. ISBN 978-981-96-8540-0.
- Nazarova, Evgeniya L. (30 August 2006). "Russia (Rus')". In Alan V., Alan V. (ed.). The Crusades: An Encyclopedia [4 Volumes]. Bloomsbury Academic. pp. 1052–1055. ISBN 978-1-57607-862-4.
- Obolensky, Dimitri (1971). "Commentary on the ninth chapter of Constantine Porphyrogenitus' De Administrando lmperio". Byzantium and the Slavs: Collected Studies. Variorum Reprints. ISBN 978-0-902089-14-3.
- Pape, Carsten (2016). "Титул Ивана III по датским источникам позднего Средневековья" [The title of Ivan III according to late-medieval Danish sources]. Studia Slavica et Balcanica Petropolitana (in Russian). 20 (2). St. Petersburg: 65–75. doi:10.21638/11701/spbu19.2016.205. Archived from the original on 2023-05-29.
- Parppei, Kati M. J. (5 January 2017). The Battle of Kulikovo Refought: "The First National Feat". BRILL. ISBN 978-90-04-33794-7.
- Presnyakov, Aleksandr E. (1970). Rieber, Alfred J. (ed.). The Formation of the Great Russian State: A Study of Russian History in the Thirteenth to Fifteenth Centuries. Translated by Moorhouse, A.E. Quadrangle Books. ISBN 9781131812656.
- Raba, Joel (1976). "The Authority of the Muscovite Ruler at the Dawn of the Modern Era". Jahrbücher für Geschichte Osteuropas. 24 (3): 321–344. ISSN 0021-4019. JSTOR 41045311.
- Riasanovsky, Nicholas V. (27 October 2005). Russian Identities: A Historical Survey. Oxford University Press. ISBN 978-0-19-986823-0.
- Riasanovsky, Nicholas V.; Steinberg, Mark D. (2019). A History of Russia (9th ed.). New York: Oxford University Press. ISBN 978-0190645588.
- Rock, Stella (17 August 2006). "Russian piety and Orthodox culture 1380–1589". In Angold, Michael (ed.). The Cambridge History of Christianity: Volume 5, Eastern Christianity. Cambridge University Press. pp. 253–275. ISBN 978-0-521-81113-2.
- Rogozhin, N. M. (1 September 2020). "Statehood of Russia in the 16th‒17th Centuries: Power and Society". Herald of the Russian Academy of Sciences. 90 (5): 504–509. doi:10.1134/S1019331620050056. ISSN 1555-6492.
- Sashalmi, Endre (25 October 2022). Russian Notions of Power and State in a European Perspective, 1462–1725: Assessing the Significance of Peter's Reign. Academic Studies Press. ISBN 978-1-64469-419-0.
- Shaikhutdinov, Marat (2021). Between East and West: The Formation of the Moscow State. Academic Studies Press. doi:10.2307/j.ctv249sgn2. ISBN 978-1-64469-713-9.
- Shevzov, Vera (21 August 2012). "The Russian Tradition". In Augustine, Augustine (ed.). The Orthodox Christian World. Routledge. pp. 15–40. ISBN 978-1-136-31484-1.
- Shmidt, S. O. (2013). История Москвы и проблемы москвоведения. Том 1 [The history of Moscow and problems with Moscow studies, vol. 1] (in Russian). Moscow: Русский путь. ISBN 978-5-85887-437-9.
- Shvidkovsky, Dmitry Olegovich (1 January 2007). Russian Architecture and the West. Yale University Press. ISBN 978-0-300-10912-2.
- Solovyov, A. V. (1957). "Византийское имя России" [The Byzantine name of Russia]. Византийский Временник (in Russian). 12. Академия наук СССР: 134–155. ISSN 0132-3776.
- Taagepera, Rein (September 1997). "Expansion and Contraction Patterns of Large Polities: Context for Russia" (PDF). International Studies Quarterly. 41 (3): 475–504. doi:10.1111/0020-8833.00053. JSTOR 2600793. Archived (PDF) from the original on 2020-07-07.
- Trepanier, Lee (2010). "Muscovite Russia (ca. 1240 – ca. 1505)". Political Symbols in Russian History: Church, State, and the Quest for Order and Justice. Lanham, Maryland: Lexington Books. ISBN 9780739117897.
- Vodoff, Vladimir (2000a). "Ivan III (1440–1505)". In Vauchez, Andre (ed.). Encyclopedia of the Middle Ages. Vol. 2. Fitzroy Dearborn Publishers. p. 747. ISBN 978-1-57958-282-1.
- Vodoff, Vladimir (2000b). "Moscow". In Vauchez, Andre (ed.). Encyclopedia of the Middle Ages. Vol. 2. James Clarke & Co. p. 989. ISBN 978-0-227-67931-9.
- Vodoff, Vladimir (2000c). "Russia, North-East". In Vauchez, Andre (ed.). Encyclopedia of the Middle Ages. Vol. 2. Fitzroy Dearborn Publishers. p. 1268. ISBN 978-1-57958-282-1.
- Ward, Christopher J.; Thompson, John M. (20 July 2021). "The Rise of Moscow, 1328–1533". Russia: A Historical Introduction from Kievan Rus' to the Present (9th ed.). Routledge. pp. 35–50. doi:10.4324/9781003015512-3. ISBN 978-1-000-41539-1.
- Wickham, Chris (1 January 2016). Medieval Europe. Yale University Press. ISBN 978-0-300-20834-4.
- Wigzell, Faith (2010). Kivelson, Valerie A.; Greene, Robert H. (eds.). "Orthodox Russia: Belief and Practice under the Tsars". Folklorica. 9 (2): 169–171. doi:10.17161/folklorica.v9i2.3754. ISSN 1920-0242.
- Wortman, Richard S. (31 October 2013). Scenarios of Power: Myth and Ceremony in Russian Monarchy from Peter the Great to the Abdication of Nicholas II - New Abridged One-Volume Edition. Princeton University Press. ISBN 978-1-4008-4969-7.
- Wren, Melvin C.; Stults, Taylor (8 January 2009). The Course of Russian History (5th ed.). Wipf and Stock Publishers. ISBN 978-1-60608-371-0.
- Wright, Thomas Edmund Farnsworth (2015). A Dictionary of World History. Oxford University Press. ISBN 978-0-19-968569-1.
- Zenkovsky, Serge A. (1963). Medieval Russia's Epics, Chronicles, and Tales. New York: Penguin Books. OCLC 263633935.
- Ziegler, Charles E. (13 October 2009). The History of Russia (2nd ed.). Bloomsbury Publishing USA. ISBN 978-0-313-36308-5.
