= Agrypina =

14th-century Lithuanian noblewoman

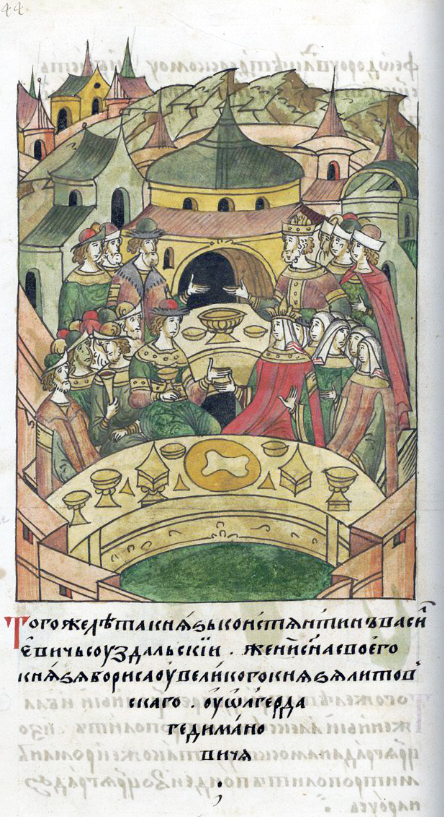
- The wedding of Boris of Suzdal and Agrypina, miniature from the Illustrated Chronicle of Ivan the Terrible (16th century)
- Spouse: Boris of Suzdal
- Issue: Ivan Borisovich Tugoy Luk; Daniil Borisovich
- Father: Algirdas
- Mother: Maria of Vitebsk

Agrypina or Agrafena (Russian: Агриппина, romanized: Agrippina; fl. 14th century) was a Lithuanian noblewoman from the Gediminid dynasty. She was a daughter of Grand Duke Algirdas by his first wife Maria of Vitebsk. In 1354, she married the Russian prince Boris of Suzdal and became the princess of Nizhny Novgorod-Suzdal.

== Life ==
She was a daughter of Grand Duke Algirdas by his first wife Maria of Vitebsk.

In 1354, she married Boris of Suzdal, son of Konstantin and brother of Dmitry. This is only mentioned in the Suprasl Chronicle, a transcription of the first Lithuanian Chronicle. One Russian chronicle, the Voskresensky Chronicle, confirms the marriage, but does not record the bride's name. That is the only reliable information available about Agrypina. Her husband attempted to take control over the throne of Nizhny Novgorod-Suzdal following the death of Andrey of Suzdal, but failed when he was opposed by Grand Prince Dmitry of Moscow.

== Sources ==
- Boguslavsky, Vladimir V.; Kuksina, Elena I. (2001). "Борис Константинович". Славянская энциклопедия. Киевская Русь — Московия. Т. 1: А–М (in Russian). Moskva: ОЛМА Медиа Групп. p. 101–102. ISBN 9785224022502.
- Fennell, John (15 November 2023). The Emergence of Moscow, 1304-1359. Univ of California Press. ISBN 978-0-520-34759-5.
- Rowell, S. C. (6 March 2014). Lithuania Ascending. Cambridge University Press. ISBN 978-1-107-65876-9.
