= Boris of Suzdal =

Prince of Suzdal from 1383 to 1392

Boris Konstantinovich
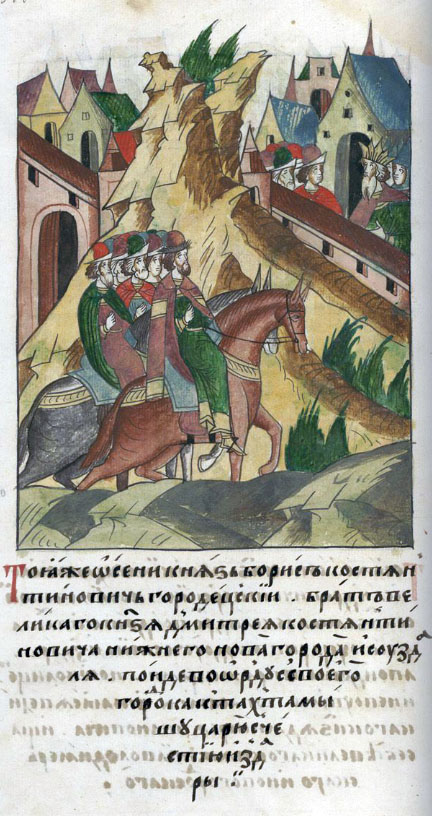
- Miniature from the Illustrated Chronicle of Ivan the Terrible (16th century)

Grand Prince of Nizhny Novgorod-Suzdal
- Reign: 1365
- Predecessor: Andrey
- Successor: Dmitry
- Reign: 1383–1392
- Predecessor: Dmitry
- Successor: Monarchy abolished
- Died: 1394
- House: Rurik
- Father: Konstantin of Suzdal

Boris Konstantinovich (Russian: Борис Константинович; died 1394) was Grand Prince of Nizhny Novgorod-Suzdal in 1365 and from 1383 to 1392. He was the third son of Konstantin of Suzdal.

== Reign ==
Andrey was born around 1335. He was the third of the four sons of Konstantin of Suzdal. After his father's death in 1355, he received Gorodets. After his elder brother Andrey died childless in 1365, Boris sought to occupy the grand princely throne. His elder brother Dmitry, who was supposed to inherit the throne according to traditional succession practices, requested assistance from Grand Prince Dmitry of Moscow, who sent Sergius of Radonezh to persuade Boris to reconcile with his brother. However, Boris refused, which led to Dmitry of Moscow sending Muscovite forces to the aid of Dmitry.

Following the death of his brother Dmitry in 1383, Boris received the patent for the throne of Nizhny Novgorod-Suzdal. In 1391, Boris returned to his principality after receiving the patent for the throne from the khan; however, Vasily I of Moscow was able to purchase the charter for the entire principality from Tokhtamysh and the boyars of Nizhny Novgorod betrayed Boris by opening the city's gates to Muscovite forces in 1392, after which Nizhny Novgorod lost its independence. Boris may have retained his former title in 1393–1394 as a service prince. He died in 1394.

== Family ==
According to Russian chronicles, Boris married a daughter of Algirdas in 1354. She is named Agrypina in one chronicle.

== Sources ==
- "Борис Константинович" . Brockhaus and Efron Encyclopedic Dictionary (in Russian). 1906.
- Boguslavsky, Vladimir V.; Kuksina, Elena I. (2001). "Борис Константинович". Славянская энциклопедия. Киевская Русь — Московия. Т. 1: А–М (in Russian). Moskva: ОЛМА Медиа Групп. p. 101–102. ISBN 9785224022502.
- Feldbrugge, Ferdinand J. M. (2 October 2017). A History of Russian Law: From Ancient Times to the Council Code (Ulozhenie) of Tsar Aleksei Mikhailovich of 1649. BRILL. ISBN 978-90-04-35214-8.
- Fennell, John (15 November 2023). The Emergence of Moscow, 1304-1359. Univ of California Press. ISBN 978-0-520-34759-5.
- Nazarov, V. D. (2013). "Нижегородское княжество" [Principality of Nizhny Novgorod]. In Kravets, S. L. (ed.). Большая Российская энциклопедия. Том 22: Нанонаука — Николай Кавасила (in Russian). Большая Российская энциклопедия. pp. 669–671. ISBN 978-5-85270-358-3.
