= Principality of Nizhny Novgorod-Suzdal =

Russian principality (1341–1392)

Principality of Nizhny Novgorod-Suzdal Нижегородско-Суздальское княжество
- 1341–1392/1446
- Coat of arms

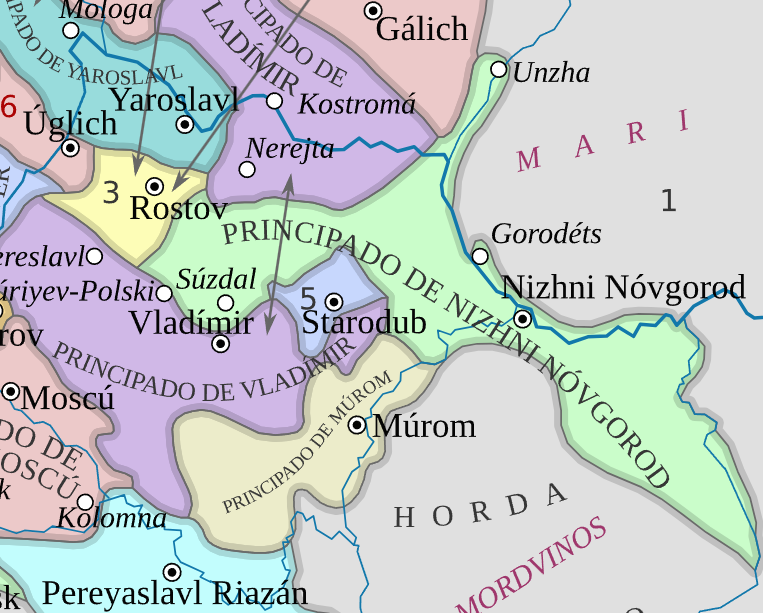
- Principality of Nizhny Novgorod c. 1350
- Capital: Suzdal (1341–1350); Nizhny Novgorod (1350–1392)
- Common languages: Russian
- Religion: Russian Orthodoxy
- Government: Feudal monarchy
- Prince
  - 1341–1355: Konstantin (first)
  - 1383–1392: Boris (last)
- History
  - Established: 1341
  - Disestablished: 1392/1446
- Currency: Ruble, denga
Preceded by	Succeeded by
Vladimir-Suzdal	Grand Principality of Moscow

The Principality of Nizhny Novgorod-Suzdal, (Note: Russian: Нижегородско-Суздальское княжество, romanized: Nizhegorodsko-Suzdalskoye knyazhestvo.) also known as the Grand Principality of Nizhny Novgorod-Suzdal, (Note: Russian: Нижегородско-Суздальское великое княжество, romanized: Nizhegorodsko-Suzdalskoye velikoye knyazhestvo.) was a Russian principality.

It was established in 1341, when Konstantin of Suzdal gained control of Gorodets and Nizhny Novgorod. In 1350, he transferred his seat from Suzdal to the latter and assumed the title of grand prince.

In the mid-14th century, Nizhny Novgorod-Suzdal replaced Tver as a potential rival to Moscow. From 1360 to 1362, Dmitry of Suzdal occupied the throne of the Grand Principality of Vladimir and was able to briefly break the line of Muscovite princes. However, in 1392, the principality was annexed by Moscow, although it was not until the mid-15th century that all its territories were permanently incorporated.

== History ==
Nizhny Novgorod was the center of an appanage principality but reverted to the grand prince of Vladimir as an escheat in 1320. In 1341, Özbeg Khan died and Konstantin of Suzdal took advantage of the situation by occupying Nizhny Novgorod and Gorodets. He may have received the right from the khan of the Golden Horde, possibly Jani Beg, to the title of grand prince of Nizhny Novgorod and Gorodets. The Rogozh Chronicle is the only source to mention this, and it says he "sat in Nizhny Novgorod [and] Gorodets upon the grand-princely throne". This may explain why Simeon of Moscow did not use military force to reverse Konstantin's gains. After Jani Beg established himself as khan in 1342, Simeon was able to persuade the boyars of Nizhny Novgorod and Gorodets to transfer their allegiance to him; however, Jani Beg confirmed Konstantin's ownership of the eastern Volga district.

In 1347, the principality received its own bishop. Metropolitan Theognostus appointed Nafanail as the bishop of Suzdal, and presumably Gorodets and Nizhny Novgorod as well. The Rogozh Chronicle also mentions Konstantin establishing new buildings. According to the historian John L. I. Fennell, Jani Beg likely altered his policy from that of his father due to the weakened state of the Grand Duchy of Lithuania following the death of Gediminas. Simeon of Moscow was able to restore Muscovite dominance in Novgorod, and as a result, Jani Beg was unwilling to strengthen Moscow through the re-acquisition of the eastern Volga district.

By 1353, Moscow had been weakened by the deaths of Simeon and his sons, his brother Andrey, as well as the metropolitan, all from the Black Death. Simeon was succeeded by his brother Ivan, who lost control of Novgorod and faced increasing opposition. Konstantin of Suzdal enjoyed the backing of Novgorod, which sent ambassadors "requesting that the grand principality be given to Prince Konstantin of Suzdal'". However, Jani Beg granted the patent for the throne of the Grand Principality of Vladimir to Ivan due to Konstantin's dynastic ties to Lithuania. Despite this, in 1355, Konstantin drew up a treaty of friendship with Moscow; he died the same year, "having honourably defended his patrimony against princes stronger than himself". Konstantin's son Andrey also drew up a treaty with Ivan the following year and recognized him as his "elder brother", or feudal superior.

Following the death of Ivan in 1359, Dmitry of Suzdal renewed Nizhny Novgorod's claim to the grand princely title, but after a period of negotiations, Khan Murad recognized Dmitry of Moscow as grand prince in 1362. Metropolitan Alexius also sought the approval of Mamai's protégé, Abdallāh, to further strengthen Dmitry of Moscow's claim. In response, Murad withdrew his recognition of Dmitry of Moscow and instead recognized Dmitry of Suzdal as grand prince. After the Muscovite army demonstrated a show of force, Dmitry of Suzdal abandoned his claim to the title, and in 1364, he signed a treaty of friendship with Moscow. Two years later, he arranged for his daughter to marry Dmitry of Moscow.

The settlement of Kurmysh was founded in 1372 when its establishment on the Sura River was ordered. It was the easternmost Russian settlement for almost two centuries and it helped to consolidate Russian influence in the Volga region. As a result, it bore the brunt of attacks from the east. The princes of Nizhny Novgorod were able to achieve a series of victories over individual detachments of the Golden Horde in the 1370s, but they suffered a crushing defeat in 1377 at the battle on Pyana River. The Russian troops were crushed by Arab Shah, leading to Nizhny Novgorod being plundered and occupied until 1378.

Following the death of Dmitry in 1383, Boris ascended to the throne of Nizhny Novgorod, while Dmitry's son Semyon received Suzdal and his brother Vasily was granted Gorodets. In 1388, they besieged Nizhny Novgorod with the support of Muscovite forces due to dissatisfaction with the distribution of territories. A peace treaty was concluded five days later. According to one interpretation of the terms, Vasily became the grand prince of Nizhny Novgorod while Boris received Gorodets. According to another interpretation, Boris continued to occupy the grand princely throne but ceded almost the entirety of Nizhny Novgorod volost to his nephews. In 1391, Boris returned to his principality after receiving the patent for the throne from the khan; however, Vasily I of Moscow was able to purchase the charter for the entire principality from Tokhtamysh and the boyars of Nizhny Novgorod betrayed Boris by opening the city's gates to Muscovite forces in 1392, after which Nizhny Novgorod lost its independence.

Despite the annexation, the territories of the principality were not fully incorporated into the Moscow grand principality until the mid-15th century. Vasily I re-incorporated Nizhny Novgorod into the grand principality and restored direct ecclesiastical control to the metropolitan. From 1393 to 1394, Boris may have retained his former title, but instead became a service prince. Throughout the first half of the 15th century, there were several attempts by representatives of the Suzdal branch of Rurikids to restore the independence of Nizhny Novgorod. During Edigu's raid in 1408, independence was briefly re-established and Boris's son Daniil sat on the throne from 1409 until 1415, when Muscovite forces regained control over Nizhny Novgorod and expelled Daniil. The independence of Nizhny Novgorod was restored one final time in 1445 by Ulugh Muhammad during the Muscovite Civil War. However, the following year, Dmitry Shemyaka brought it to an end.

== List of princes ==
- Konstantin (1341–1355)
- Andrey (1355–1365)
- Dmitry (1365–1383)
- Boris (1383–1392)

== See also ==
- Bibliography of Russian history

== Sources ==
- Crummey, Robert O. (6 June 2014) [1987]. The Formation of Muscovy, 1300–1613. Routledge. ISBN 978-1-317-87200-9.
- Favereau, Marie; Pochekaev, Roman Yu. (2023). "The Golden Horde, c. 1260–1502". The Cambridge History of the Mongol Empire. Cambridge University Press. pp. 243–318. ISBN 978-1-107-11648-1.
- Feldbrugge, Ferdinand J. M. (2 October 2017). A History of Russian Law: From Ancient Times to the Council Code (Ulozhenie) of Tsar Aleksei Mikhailovich of 1649. BRILL. ISBN 978-90-04-35214-8.
- Fennell, John L. I. (15 November 2023) [1968]. The Emergence of Moscow, 1304–1359. Univ of California Press. ISBN 978-0-520-34759-5.
- Gorsky, Anton A. (2016). Русские земли в XIII-XIV веках: пути политического развития [The Russian lands in the 13th–14th centuries] (in Russian). Наука. ISBN 978-5-02-039659-3.
- Kiryanov, Igor A. (1961). Старинные крепости Нижегородского Поволжья: очерк о старинных русских дерево-крепостях в Н. Новгороде (Горьком): Городце, селе Городищи (Борского района), Лыскове, Курмыше, Василосурске, Балахне, Б. Мурашкине, Арзамасе (in Russian). Горьковское книжное изд-во.
- Shaikhutdinov, Marat (2021). Between East and West: The Formation of the Moscow State. Academic Studies Press. doi:10.2307/j.ctv249sgn2. ISBN 978-1-64469-713-9.
- Nazarov, V. D. (2013). "Нижегородское княжество" [Principality of Nizhny Novgorod]. In Kravets, S. L. (ed.). Большая Российская энциклопедия. Том 22: Нанонаука — Николай Кавасила (in Russian). Большая Российская энциклопедия. pp. 669–671. ISBN 978-5-85270-358-3.
