= Herald of the Russian Academy of Sciences =

- Discipline: Multidisciplinary
- Language: English
- Edited by: Alexey Khokhlov

Publication details
- Former name: Herald of the Academy of Sciences of the USSR
- History: 1931–present
- Publisher: MAIK Nauka/Interperiodica and Springer Science+Business Media (Russia)
- Frequency: Monthly
- Open access: Hybrid
- Impact factor: 0.560 (2020)

Standard abbreviations
- ISO 4: Her. Russ. Acad. Sci.

Indexing
- CODEN: HRUSEG
- ISSN: 1019-3316 (print); 1555-6492 (web)
- LCCN: 92641708
- OCLC no.: 70220376

Links
- Journal homepage; Online access; Journal page at MAIK Nauka/Interperiodica website

Established in 1931, the Herald of the Russian Academy of Sciences (Vestnik Rossiiskoi Akademii Nauk) is a monthly peer-reviewed academic journal published by MAIK Nauka/Interperiodica and Springer Science+Business Media. It covers major contributions, speeches, and presentations to the Russian Academy of Sciences from both Russian and foreign academics. Subjects encompass natural, technical, and social sciences, as well as education, the environment, the value of scientific knowledge, and researchers' relationship to society. Since April 2018, the editor-in-chief is Alexey Khokhlov (one of the vice-presidents of the Russian Academy of Sciences).

== Editors-in-chief ==
Herald of the Academy of Sciences of the USSR:

- acad. V.P. Volgin (1931—1935, 1945–1951)
- acad. N.P. Gorbunov (1936—1937)
- acad. V. L. Komarov (1937—1945)
- acad. S. I. Vavilov (1945, acting)
- acad. A. N. Nesmeyanov (1951—1953)
- acad. K. V. Ostrovityanov (1953—1963)
- acad. V. A. Kirillin (1963—1965)
- acad. N. M. Sissakian (1965—1966)
- acad. M. D. Millionshchikov (1966—1973)
- acad. P. N. Fedoseev (1973-1974, acting)
- acad. V. A. Kotelnikov (1974—1987)
- acad. I. M. Makarov (1988—1991)

Herald of the Russian Academy of Sciences:

- acad. I. M. Makarov (1992—1997)
- acad. N. A. Plate (1997—2002)
- acad. Yu. S. Osipov (2002—2013)
- acad. V. E. Fortov (2014—2018)
- acad. A. R. Khokhlov (since 2018)

== Abstracting and indexing ==
The journal is abstracted and indexed in:

- Current Contents/Physical, Chemical and Earth Sciences
- Science Citation Index Expanded
- Scopus
- Chemical Abstracts Service
- CSA Illumina

According to the Journal Citation Reports, the journal has a 2020 impact factor of 0.560.
