= Andrey of Suzdal =

Prince of Suzdal from 1355 to 1365

Andrey Konstantinovich
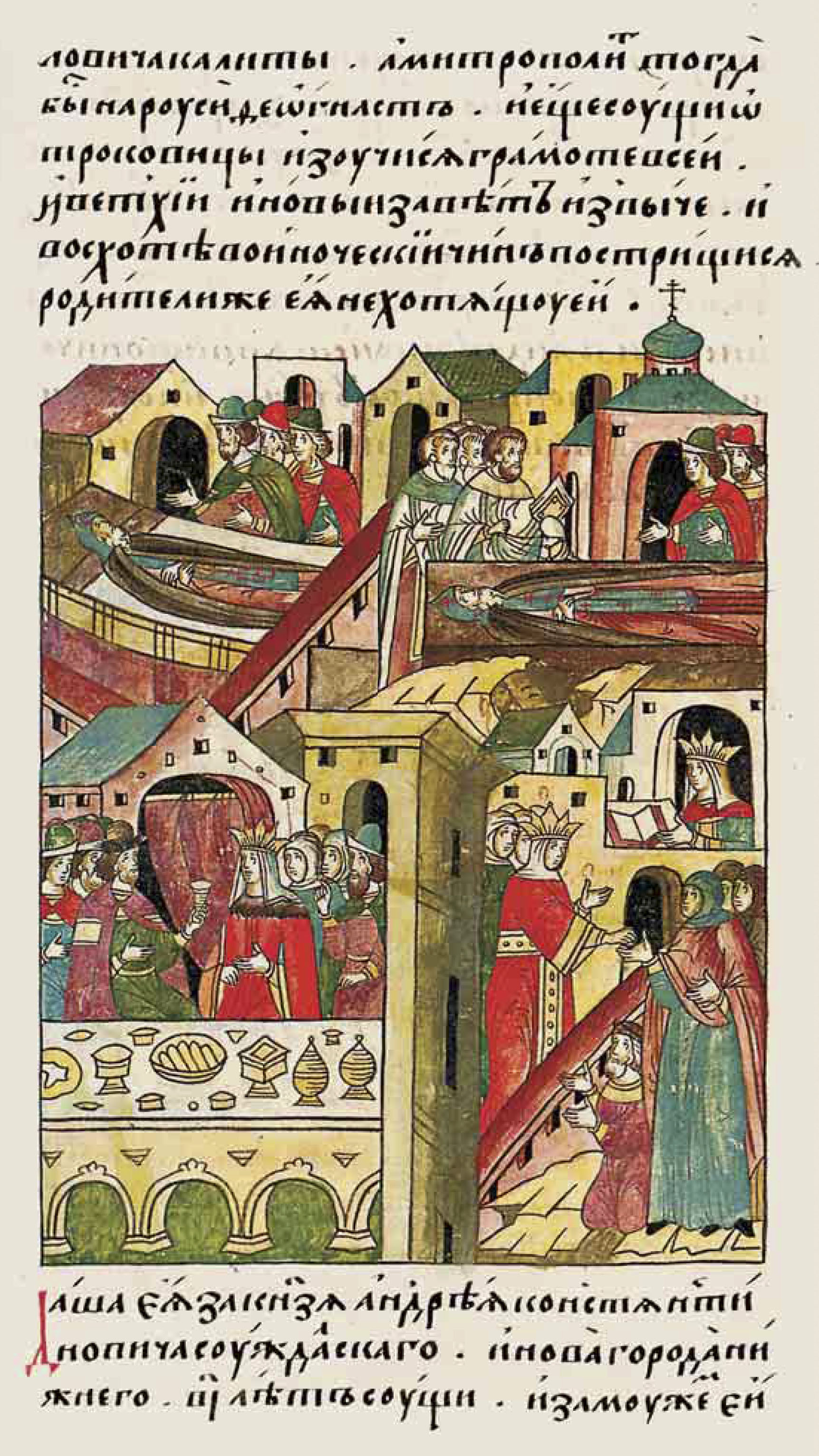
- The wedding and death of Andrey, miniature from the Illustrated Chronicle of Ivan the Terrible (16th century)

Grand Prince of Nizhny Novgorod-Suzdal
- Reign: 1355–1365
- Predecessor: Konstantin
- Successor: Dmitry
- Died: 2 June 1365
- House: Rurik
- Father: Konstantin of Suzdal

Andrey Konstantinovich (Russian: Андрей Константинович; c. 1320 – 2 June 1365) was Grand Prince of Nizhny Novgorod-Suzdal from 1355 until his death in 1365. He was the eldest son of Konstantin of Suzdal. He is venerated as a saint in the Russian Orthodox Church.

== Reign ==
Andrey was born around 1320, no later than 1323. He was the eldest of the four sons of Konstantin of Suzdal. After his father's death in 1355, Andrey received the patent for the throne of Nizhny Novgorod-Suzdal from the khan of the Golden Horde.

The following year, he went to Pereslavl-Zalessky for a conference with Grand Prince Ivan II of Moscow. There, Andrey did not contest Moscow's claim to the Grand Principality of Vladimir. In 1360, following the death of Ivan, Andrey refused to accept the patent for the grand principality. Instead, the patent was given to his younger brother Dmitry. Andrey's apoliticality led to his younger brother Boris taking over governance by 1363.

Russian chronicles say that Andrey, like his wife Vassa (Vasilisa), was "very spiritual and full of virtue". He took monastic vows in 1364 and died on 2 June 1365. He was buried in Nizhny Novgorod. He left no children.

== Sources ==
- "Андрей Константинович" . Brockhaus and Efron Encyclopedic Dictionary (in Russian). 1906.
- Nazarenko, A. V. (2001). "Андрей Константинович". Православная энциклопедия —Т. II: Алексий, человек Божий — Анфим Анхиальский. Moscow: Православная энциклопедия. pp. 367–368. ISBN 5-89572-007-2.
- Boguslavsky, Vladimir V.; Kuksina, Elena I. (2001). "Андрей Константинович". Славянская энциклопедия. Киевская Русь — Московия. Т. 1: А–М (in Russian). Moskva: ОЛМА Медиа Групп. p. 32. ISBN 9785224022502.
- Feldbrugge, Ferdinand J. M. (2 October 2017). A History of Russian Law: From Ancient Times to the Council Code (Ulozhenie) of Tsar Aleksei Mikhailovich of 1649. BRILL. ISBN 978-90-04-35214-8.
- Fennell, John (2023) [1968]. The Emergence of Moscow, 1304–1359. University of California Press. ISBN 978-0-520-34759-5.
