= Black Death in Russia =

Disease in Russia between 1352 and 1353

Spread of the Black Death. It spread from Pskov in 1352 and finally reached Moscow in 1353.

The Black Death was present in Russia between 1352 and 1353. The plague epidemic is described in contemporary Russian chronicles, but without confirmed dates.

The Black Death entered Europe from the Golden Horde in Central Asia in 1347, but it did not reach Russia from Central Asia in the southeast. Due to religious reasons, the border between Christian Russia and the Muslim Golden Horde was closed, which may have helped prevent the plague from spreading to Russia through this route. Instead, it reached Russia from the northwest after spreading across the rest of Europe.

The Black Death finally reached Russia from the Baltics in the west. Its first documented outbreak in Russia occurred in the city of Pskov in the spring of 1352. From there, it reached Novgorod and continued to travel south, eventually affecting the rest of Russia.

== Background ==
At this point in time, most of what is now southern Russia was dominated by the Golden Horde. To the north, the Russian principalities paid tribute to the Tatars. The Moscow principality was one of the leading principalities, and would eventually serve as the core of the future Russian state. In northwestern Russia, the merchant republics of Novgorod and Pskov were in close proximity to the Baltic Sea. The Black Death reached northern Russia in 1352, beginning with the towns close to the Baltic.

== Plague migration ==
The Black Death reached the Golden Horde in 1346, when the Tatars attacked the Genoese in Crimea during the siege of Caffa. George Vernadsky estimated that 85,000 people died in Crimea. In 1346–1347, it appeared in its capital, Sarai, as well as in Astrakhan and in port cities on the coast of the Black Sea. As the Black Death appeared in Central Asia and Crimea, the Russian chroniclers wrote that it was "punishment from God on the people in the Eastern lands". As it swept into southern Russia, the destruction it caused was likened by chroniclers to the Plagues of Egypt. (Note: In entries sub anno 6854 [1346] in the Nikon Chronicle and the Muscovite Grand Princely Codex at the End of the 15th Century.)

The Nikon Chronicle has an entry under 1351 in which the chronicler states that God brought a plague as punishment and warns against sin. The Black Death reached the city of Pskov in 1352, killing many people of the city, before moving into the countryside. According to Ole Jørgen Benedictow, it likely spread to Pskov from the area of present-day Latvia. Those who coughed blood died within three days. Many fled to the monasteries as a result, awaiting their deaths after taking holy orders, while others gave away their property to the church or the poor in order to cleanse their souls.

The Black Death soon reached Novgorod the same year and chronicles describe a similarly high death toll. From Novgorod, the plague appeared in "all the Russian land". It moved southward along well-traveled routes, reaching the city of Moscow in 1353. The precise path of the plague is not known, but it traveled along well-established commercial and trade routes. Historians have questioned why the Black Death did not reach Russia from the south, given that there was increased commercial contact with Crimea and the Golden Horde; Russian chronicles also recorded a second wave of plague in 1364–1365 that came from the Volga region. As most of the population of 14th-century Russia consisted of peasants who lived in rural communities, the high level of devastation suggests that pneumonic plague was to blame.

According to Vernadsky, the Russian steppe was sparsely inhabited and therefore functioned as a buffer zone between the principalities and the Golden Horde. Langer questioned Vernadsky's explanation because he found it "still quite possible that the path of the Black Death along the Dnepr river may have originated in the Crimea or possibly from Lithuania". A 2017 paper by Cesana, Benedictow and Bianucci showed a map with an approximate border between the Golden Horde and the principalities.

== Consequences ==
Vasily Kalika, the archbishop of Novgorod, led processions in Pskov but soon died from the plague in 1352 while returning to Novgorod. In 1353, within a week of it reaching Moscow, Grand Prince Simeon had died from the plague along with his brother and two sons. The head of the Russian Orthodox Church, based in Moscow, may have also died from the plague. The aristocracy of Moscow was also heavily affected, which weakened the ascendancy of the principality for some time. The ruling family of Moscow remained small as a result of the Black Death, and a new vertical pattern of princely succession from father to son was defined.

The lack of hearth counts or tax rolls makes it difficult to estimate the number of people who died in Russia as a result of the Black Death. Russian chronicles describe the same disease that had affected Western Europe earlier, but use imprecise terms like "very severe" and "many died". The level of mortality was likely similar to that of Western Europe in the first outbreak, with descriptions suggesting a similar effect on Russian towns, and the cycles of plague in Russia being roughly equivalent. The chronicles of Novgorod and Pskov say that hundreds died every day, while the remote town of Beloozero was so greatly affected that it had to be relocated. As Russia did not have a Jewish population, unlike in Western Europe, popular opinion sometimes blamed the Tatars.

== Sources ==
- Alexander, John T. (2003). Bubonic Plague in Early Modern Russia: Public Health and Urban Disaster. Oxford University Press. ISBN 978-0-19-515818-2.
- Belich, James (19 July 2022). The World the Plague Made: The Black Death and the Rise of Europe. Princeton University Press. ISBN 978-0-691-21566-2.
- Cesana, D.; Benedictow, O.J.; Bianucci, R. (2017). "The origin and early spread of the Black Death in Italy: first evidence of plague victims from 14th-century Liguria (northern Italy)". Anthropological Science. 125 (1): 15–24. doi:10.1537/ase.161011. ISSN 0918-7960. Archived from the original on 15 January 2025.
- Benedictow, Ole Jørgen (2004). The Black Death, 1346-1353: The Complete History. Boydell & Brewer. ISBN 978-0-85115-943-0.
- Byrne, Joseph P. (16 January 2012). Encyclopedia of the Black Death. Bloomsbury Publishing USA. ISBN 979-8-216-15485-3.
- Fennell, John (23 September 2022). The Emergence of Moscow, 1304-1359. Univ of California Press. ISBN 978-0-520-34758-8.
- Langer, Lawrence N. (1975). "The Black Death in Russia: Its Effects Upon Urban Labor". Russian History. 2 (1): 53–67. doi:10.1163/187633175X00045. ISSN 0094-288X. JSTOR 24649670.
