= Konstantin of Suzdal =

Prince of Suzdal from 1331 to 1355

Konstantin Vasilyevich
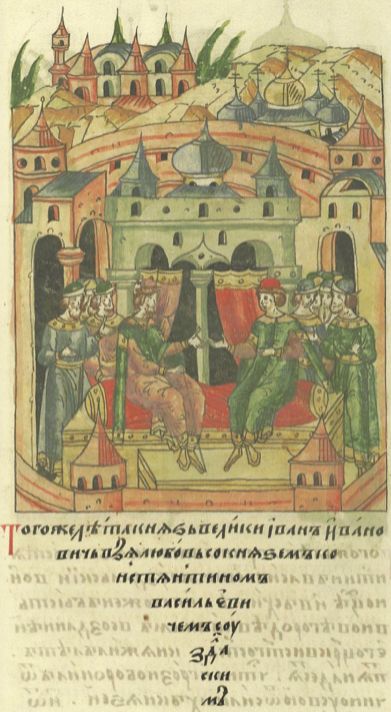
- Miniature from the Illustrated Chronicle of Ivan the Terrible (16th century)

Prince of Suzdal
- Reign: 1331–1355
- Predecessor: Aleksandr
- Successor: Andrey

Grand Prince of Nizhny Novgorod-Suzdal
- Reign: 1341–1355
- Successor: Andrey
- Died: 1355
- Issue more...: Andrey of Suzdal; Dmitry of Suzdal; Boris of Suzdal
- House: Rurik
- Father: Vasily of Suzdal

Konstantin Vasilyevich (Russian: Константин Васильевич; died 1355) was Prince of Suzdal from 1331 and Grand Prince of Nizhny Novgorod-Suzdal from 1350 until his death in 1355. He was the second son of Vasily of Suzdal.

== Reign ==
Konstantin was the younger of the two sons of Vasily of Suzdal. His older brother Aleksandr died in 1331. Konstantin is first mentioned in Russian chronicles in 1340. He took advantage of the power struggle in Sarai, the capital of the Golden Horde, and gained control of Nizhny Novgorod and Gorodets. The Rogozh Chronicle says that Konstantin "sat in Nizhny Novgorod [and] Gorodets upon the grand-princely throne", which indicates that he obtained the right to the title from the khan. In 1350, he moved his seat from Suzdal to Nizhny Novgorod. He took control of the territories inhabited by the Mordvins and sent Russian colonists there.

Following the death of Simeon of Moscow in 1353, Konstantin challenged the right of Simeon's younger brother Ivan to claim the grand princely throne and he had the support of Novgorod. Despite this, the khan of the Golden Horde gave the patent for the throne to Ivan.

In 1355, Konstantin signed a treaty of friendship with Moscow and at the same time, the city of Novgorod "made peace with Prince Ivan". Following Konstantin's death the same year, his eldest son Andrey succeeded him and drew a treaty with Ivan the next year. In exchange for gifts, Andrey recognized the prince of Moscow as his "elder brother", or his feudal superior.

== Issue ==
He had six children:

- Andrey (died 1365), grand prince of Nizhny Novgorod-Suzdal;
- Dmitry (died 1383), grand prince of Nizhny Novgorod-Suzdal and grand prince of Vladimir;
- Evdokia, married Mikhail of Mikulin;
- Boris (died 1394), grand prince of Nizhny Novgorod-Suzdal;
- Dmitry the Younger;
- Antonida, married Andrey Fyodorovich of Rostov.

== Bibliography ==
- Boguslavsky, Vladimir V.; Kuksina, Elena I. (2001). "Константин Васильевич". Славянская энциклопедия. Киевская Русь — Московия. Т. 1: А–М (in Russian). Moskva: ОЛМА Медиа Групп. p. 592. ISBN 9785224022502.
- Feldbrugge, Ferdinand J. M. (2 October 2017). A History of Russian Law: From Ancient Times to the Council Code (Ulozhenie) of Tsar Aleksei Mikhailovich of 1649. BRILL. ISBN 978-90-04-35214-8.
- Fennell, John (2023) [1968]. The Emergence of Moscow, 1304–1359. University of California Press. ISBN 978-0-520-34759-5.
