= Dmitry of Suzdal =

Prince of Suzdal and Nizhny Novgorod

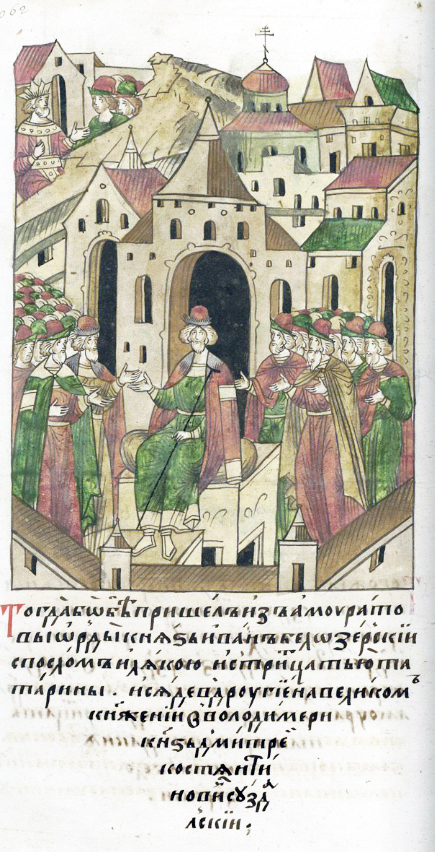
Dmitry in the Illustrated Chronicle of Ivan the Terrible

Dmitry Konstantinovich (Russian: Дмитрий Константинович; 1323–1383) was Prince of Suzdal and Grand Prince of Nizhny Novgorod-Suzdal from 1365. He took the title of Grand Prince of Vladimir from his son-in-law, Dmitry Donskoy, from 1360 to 1363. The famous Shuisky family descends from his eldest son, Vasily Kirdyapa.

== Biography ==
A son of Konstantin of Suzdal, he was a senior descendant of Vsevolod the Big Nest and also of Yaroslav II of Vladimir (Dmitry was great-grandson of Yaroslav II's third son Andrey II of Vladimir), inheriting Suzdal in 1359 and Nizhny Novgorod in 1365. His policy towards Tatars was conciliatory for the most part, as his eastern lands were continuously exposed to their attacks. After some rivalry with Dmitry of Moscow, he was installed by the Khan of the Golden Horde as the Grand Duke of Vladimir in 1360. During his reign, he repeatedly quarreled with the Novgorod Republic over the raids of Novgorodian pirates who looted his own capital and Tatar markets along the Volga River.

Three years later he was dethroned and had to make peace with Dmitry by marrying him to his daughter, Eudoxia. Joining his army with Dmitry's, he led an allied assault on Volga Bulgars and Mordovia. In 1377, the allied armies were defeated by the Tatars at the Battle on Pyana River, because (as the chronicler put it) they were too drunk to fight. However, in 1382, Dmitry Konstantinovich took the side of Khan Tokhtamysh in taking over Moscow and sent his sons to serve in the Tatar army.

== Family ==
He had issue:

- Vasiliy Kirdyapa c. 1350–1403, prince of Suzdal. An agnatic descendant of 6th generation is Vasili IV Shuisky, tsar of Russia.
- Ivan Dmitriyevich (died 2 August 1377 in the Battle on Pyana River).
- Simeon died 1402, prince of Suzdal. A descendant of 6th generation is Patriarch Filaret of Moscow, father of Michael I Romanov, tsar of Russia.
- Eudoxia died 1407, married to Dmitry Donskoy grand prince of Moscow.

Regnal titles
| Preceded by Ivan II | Grand Prince of Vladimir; 1359–1362 | Succeeded by Dmitry Donskoy |
