= Of Beloozero =

Toponymic epithet

Of Beloozero is a toponymic epithet associated the Principality of Beloozero or the city Beloozero. Notable people with this epithet include:

- Cyril of Beloozero
- Fyodor I of Beloozero
- Fyodor II of Beloozero
- Gleb of Beloozero
- Mikhail of Beloozero
- Roman of Beloozero
- Yury of Beloozero

== See also ==
- Prince of Beloozero
