= Belosselsky-Belozersky =

Belosselsky-Belozersky may refer to:

- Belosselsky-Belozersky family
- Sergei Belosselsky-Belozersky
- Constantine Esperovich Beloselsky-Belozersky
- Prince Belozersky
- Beloselsky-Belozersky Palace
