= Dmitry Borisovich =

Prince of Rostov (1278–1286; 1288–1294)

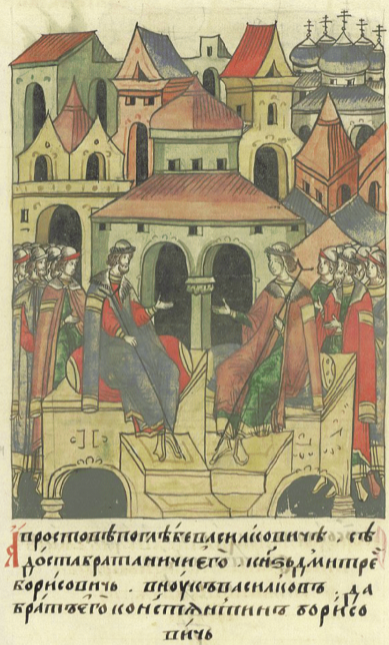
- Dmitry and Konstantin, after the death of Gleb Vasilkovich, sit down in the Rostov land. Miniature from the Illustrated Chronicle of Ivan the Terrible (16th century)

Prince of Rostov
- Reign: 1278–1286
- Predecessor: Gleb
- Successor: Konstantin
- Reign: 1288–1294
- Predecessor: Konstantin
- Successor: Konstantin

Prince of Uglich
- Reign: 1285–1288
- Predecessor: Roman
- Successor: Konstantin

Prince of Beloozero
- Reign: 1279–1286
- Predecessor: Mikhail
- Successor: Mikhail
- Born: 11 September 1253; Rostov
- Died: 1294 (aged 40–41); Rostov
- Issue more...: Anna of Kashin
- House: Rurik
- Father: Boris of Rostov
- Mother: Maria Yaroslavna of Murom

Dmitry Borisovich (Russian: Дмитрий Борисович; 11 September 1253 – 1294) was Prince of Rostov from 1278 to 1286 and again from 1288 to 1294. He was also Prince of Uglich from 1285 to 1288.

== Life ==
Dmitry Borisovich was born in 1253. He was the eldest of the three sons of Boris of Rostov from his marriage to Maria Yaroslavna of Murom.

In 1277, Dmitry and his mother brought back the body of his father from the Golden Horde. He occupied the throne of Rostov along with his younger brother Konstantin following the death of Gleb of Beloozero in 1278. Dmitry was not satisfied with this arrangement, and in 1279, he took the throne of Beloozero from his cousin Mikhail Glebovich and then forced his brother Konstantin to leave Rostov in 1281. Grand Prince Dmitry Aleksandrovich and the bishop of Rostov allowed him to reconcile with his brother. However, Konstantin took part in Andrey Aleksandrovich's campaign against Dmitry Aleksandrovich in 1285, which led to the devastation of Rostov.

In 1285, Dmitry's cousin Roman Vladimirovich died without an heir, which allowed him to take the throne of Uglich. The following year, Tode Mongke had apparently ordered him to give the throne of Rostov to his brother, although it was returned to Dmitry by the khan in 1288, while Konstantin moved to Uglich.

In 1286, he allied with Dmitry Aleksandrovich, whose son Ivan was married to his daughter. The following year, Dmitry, alongside Dmitry of Pereslavl, Andrey of Gorodets, Daniel of Moscow, and the Novgorodians, marched on Tver in the campaign against Mikhail of Tver. In 1293, he followed Andrey of Gorodets to the Golden Horde and participated in Dyuden's campaign, which caused devastation to numerous Russian towns. However, the following year, Dmitry died and was succeeded by his younger brother Konstantin.

== Family ==
He married one of the daughters of Dmitry of Pereslavl. They had one son, Aleksandr, and three daughters, including Anna of Kashin, a Russian saint who married Mikhail of Tver.

== Sources ==
- Boguslavsky, Vladimir V.; Kuksina, Elena I. (2001). "Дмитрий Борисович". Славянская энциклопедия. Киевская Русь — Московия. Т. 1: А–М (in Russian). Moskva: ОЛМА Медиа Групп. p. 352. ISBN 9785224022502.
- Fennell, John (13 October 2014). The Crisis of Medieval Russia 1200-1304. Routledge. ISBN 978-1-317-87314-3.
