= Of Uglich =

Toponymic epithet

Of Tver is a toponymic epithet associated the Principality of Uglich or the city of Uglich. Notable people with this epithet include:

- Andrey of Uglich
- Dmitry of Uglich
- Roman of Uglich
- Vladimir of Uglich
- Yuri of Uglich

== See also ==
- Prince of Uglich
