= Of Rostov =

Toponymic epithet

Of Rostov is a toponymic epithet associated the Principality of Rostov or the cities of Rostov Veliky and Rostov. Notable people with this epithet include:

- Abraham of Rostov
- Boris of Rostov
- Demetrius of Rostov (Saint Dmitry of Rostov)
- Irenarch of Rostov
- Isaiah of Rostov
- John the Merciful of Rostov
- Konstantin of Rostov
- Vasily of Rostov

== See also ==
- Prince of Rostov
