= Vladimir of Uglich =

Prince of Uglich from 1261 to 1285

Vladimir Konstantinovich
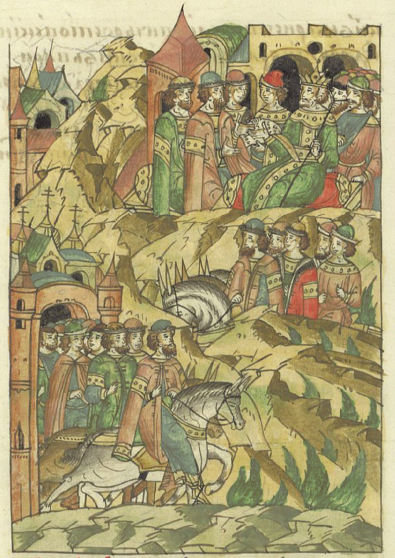
- Vladimir of Uglich, Boris of Rostov and Vasily of Yaroslavl visit Batu Khan to receive the charter for their thrones, miniature from the Illustrated Chronicle of Ivan the Terrible (16th century)

Prince of Uglich
- Reign: 1218–1249
- Predecessor: Monarchy established
- Successor: Andrey
- Died: 27 December 1249
- Issue: Andrey of Uglich; Roman of Uglich
- House: Rurik

Vladimir Konstantinovich (Russian: Владимир Константинович; 1214 – 27 December 1249) was Prince of Uglich from 1218 until his death in 1249.

== Reign ==
Vladimir Konstantinovich was born in 1214. He was the youngest of the three sons of Konstantin Vsevolodovich, the grand prince of Vladimir and prince of Rostov. In 1218, just before his death, Konstantin divided his patrimony between his sons: Vasilko received Rostov and likely Beloozero, while Vsevolod received Yaroslavl. Vladimir, who was four, later received Uglich.

In 1218, he attended the consecration of the Sts. Boris and Gleb Church in Rostov. In 1228, he attended the ordination of Mitrofan as bishop in Vladimir. The same year, he participated in the campaign against the Mordvins. In 1231, he attended the consecration of the Assumption Cathedral in Rostov.

In 1238, he participated in the battle of the Sit River during the Mongol conquest; he survived, and in 1244, he visited Batu Khan and was confirmed as prince of Uglich. On 27 December 1249, he died in Vladimir. His body was taken to Uglich with the presence of his cousin Alexander Nevsky. As he predeceased Sviatoslav, his children were barred from the grand princely title, according to traditional succession practices.

== Family ==
In 1232, he married Nadezhda Ingvarevna (d. 1278), a princess of Ryazan. They had two sons: Andrey and Roman, princes of Uglich.

== Sources ==
- "Владимир-Димитрий Константинович" . Brockhaus and Efron Encyclopedic Dictionary (in Russian). 1906.
- Boguslavsky, Vladimir V.; Kuksina, Elena I. (2001). "Владимир Константинович". Славянская энциклопедия. Киевская Русь — Московия. Т. 1: А–М (in Russian). Moskva: ОЛМА Медиа Групп. p. 192. ISBN 9785224022502.
- Feldbrugge, Ferdinand J. M. (2 October 2017). A History of Russian Law: From Ancient Times to the Council Code (Ulozhenie) of Tsar Aleksei Mikhailovich of 1649. BRILL. ISBN 978-90-04-35214-8.
- Fennell, John L. I. (13 October 2014) [1983]. The Crisis of Medieval Russia 1200-1304. Routledge. ISBN 978-1-317-87314-3.
- Fennell, John L. I. (15 November 2023) [1968]. The Emergence of Moscow, 1304–1359. University of California Press. ISBN 978-0-520-34759-5.
