= Maria of Chernigov =

Maria Mikhailovna (Russian: Мария Михайловна; c. 1212 – 1271) was the princess consort of Rostov from 1228 to 1238 during her marriage to Vasilko Konstantinovich. Following the death of her husband, she was the regent of Rostov during the minority of her son, Boris. She was also a historian.

== Life ==
Her husband, Vasilko Konstantinovich, prince of Rostov, was killed at the Battle of Sit River in 1238 during the Mongol conquest. In the late 1240s, her father, Michael of Chernigov, was executed by order of Batu Khan. Although she was expected, according to custom, to retire to a convent, she decided instead to become regent during the minority of her son Boris.

She is best known for her work as an author and historian. She participated in various literary projects, such as the compilation of a chronicle with the support of the bishop of Rostov. Her son witnessed the trial and torture of her father and later recounted these events to her, leading her to write accounts that were incorporated into a hagiography known as the Life of St. Michael of Chernigov and into the chronicles of Rostov. Compared with other Russian writings, her works are far more emotional and personal, depicting the suffering of an entire nation through the prism of a single individual. Her chronicles reflect ideas of patriotism and a desire for the liberation of the country.

== Death ==
Maria founded the Savior-Pesotsky Convent in memory of her husband. Following her death in 1271, she was buried beneath the convent's wooden church. Her youngest son, Gleb, prince of Rostov and Beloozero, was also buried there in 1278.

== Sources ==
- Brumfield, William (22 May 2020). "Rostov's Church of the Savior-on-the-Sand: beauty abandoned and restored". Russia Beyond.
- Pushkareva, Natalia (16 September 2016) [1997]. Women in Russian History: From the Tenth to the Twentieth Century. Routledge. ISBN 978-1-315-48043-5.
- Riha, Thomas (15 February 2009) [1969]. Readings in Russian Civilization Volume I: Russia before Peter the Great, 900-1700. University of Chicago Press. ISBN 978-0-226-71843-9.
