= Battle of Khankala (1222) =

1222 military conflict in the Kingdom of Alania

- Part of the Mongol invasion of Alania
Date	1222
Location	Khankala gorge, Kingdom of Alania
Result	Mongol victory

Belligerents
North Caucasians: Kingdom of Alania; Durdzuk confederation; Circassians; Lekia; Kipchak Turks: Cuman Khanate; Volga Bulgars; Khazars	Mongol Empire

Commanders and leaders
Yuri (WIA); Daniel	Subutai; Jebe

Strength
~50,000	<30,000

Casualties and losses
Heavy (almost the entire army)	Moderate

During a raid on the Caucasus conducted by the Mongol army led by Subutai and Jebe in 1222, its army clashed with a united force of North Caucasians and Kipchak Turks. The battle ended in a victory for the Mongols and the complete annihilation of the united army of North Caucasians and Kipchaks. Following their victory, the Mongols ravaged the North Caucasus, before continuing their campaign northwards.

== Background ==
In 1220, Genghis Khan sent his commanders Subutai and Jebe on a campaign, ordering them to reach "eleven countries and peoples", among whom were the "Kibchaut" (Kipchak Turks), "Orusut" (Rus'), "Machjarat" (inhabitants of the city Majar), "Asut" (Alania), "Sessut" (Durdzuks, ancestors of the Chechens and Ingush), "Serkessut" (Circassians) and others.

With an army numbering 20,000 men, each Tumen (10,000) being commanded by Subutai and Jebe respectively, the Mongols invaded and ravaged the Khwarazmian Empire, causing its disintegration. Its ruler, Muhammad II of Khwarazm, succumbed to disease on an island in the Caspian Sea, leaving his son, Jalal al-Din Mangburni landless.

Ravaging through Persia, the Mongol army arrived in modern-day Azerbaijan, where it sacked several cities, until it travelled to the Mughan plain, where they rested and also got reinforced by Kurdish and Turcoman freebooters, who offered their services to the Mongols.

At the beginning of 1221, the Mongols launched a campaign into Georgia but were driven back by the 10,000 strong Georgian army, forcing them to retreat. A month later, the army travelled to Azerbaijan, besieged Maragheh, besieged and eventually captured the city.

At the end of 1221, the Mongols advanced into Georgia once again. The reinforced Mongol army counted around 30,000 and destroyed the Georgian army, resulting in its retreat and the devastation of southern Georgia by the Mongols.

== Prelude ==
On the way to the North Caucasus, the Mongol army plundered Shemakha, the capital of Shirvanshah. Continuing their advance, the Mongols reached Derbent - the inhabitants of which did not let the army pass.

Being unable to conquer the city, the Mongols turned to the ruler of Derbent with a proposal to make peace and send several people for this purpose. Having believed the newcomers, the Lezgins sent 10 people from the honorary elders to them. But the Mongol leaders immediately killed one of them, and forced the rest under the threat of death to show them a bypass road to enter the Ciscaucasian plain. The threat, however, had the opposite effect. The fact is that the guides led the Mongol-Tatars into the mountain gorges of inner Dagestan and Chechnya, unknown to them, where the conquerors found themselves in a trap. Ibn al-Asir, Juvaini, and Kirakos Gandzaketsi report that the Mongol detachment did not pass through Derbent, but through the rugged Caucasian mountains. The passage through the Caucasian mountains was costly for the nomads, who lost hundreds of men to the cold and had to abandon their siege engines.

Based on these reports, also analyzing toponymy and local legends, historians have established that the Mongols went up the gorge of the Gilgerychay River along the route: Kasumkent - Khiv - Kumukh - Chokh - Khunzakh - Botlikh - Andiysky pass - Chechnya. According to Ibn al-Asirai, along the way, "they robbed and killed many Lezgins, who were partly Muslims and partly infidels." Soon after, the Mongols arrived in mountainous Chechnya.

== Battle ==
=== Early stages ===
In order to reach the Chechen plains from Dagestan, the Mongols had to follow the route: Kharachoy - Vedeno - the gorge of the Khulkhulau River - Shali - modern-day Grozny.

Moving through the North Caucasus, the Mongols instilled fear in the locals with "massacre, robbery and devastation." "These (Mongols)," reports Ibn al Asir, "did not take pity on anyone, but beat women, men, babies, ripped open the wombs of pregnant women and killed the fetuses." According to legends, the ancestors of the Chechens on their territory used traditional methods of defense when the enemy moved along the gorge: blockages, notches, rockfalls, forest battles, luring the enemy deep into their territory and massive pursuit, exhausting forces and demoralizing the advancing by continuous sorties, and only after that - a decisive battle. This gave the North Caucasians enough time to gather a large force and prepare for the coming major battle.

The Durdzuks allied with the Alans, the Lezgins and the Circassians. They were then joined by the Cumans, who also convinced the Khazars and Volga Bulgars to join. Combined, the army numbered around 50,000 men. The Cuman Khan, Köten placed the army under the control of his brother, Yuri and his son, Daniel.

=== Main battle ===
The battle took place in the Khankala gorge, Southwest of modern-day Grozny. The battle was divided into three parts: in the first one, although being unable to achieve a decisive victory, the coalition managed to force the Mongols back. During the first battle, both sides had suffered heavy casualties. The Mongol commanders embarked on a trick: before the start of the second battle, the Mongols sent ambassadors to the feudal Lords of the Kipchak Turks. "We and you are of the same kind, and these Alans are not from yours," they said, "so you have nothing to help them; our faith is not like their faith, and we promise you that we will attack them, and we will bring you money and clothes as much as you want; leave us with them." By promising them the treasures of the Caucasian tribes and reminding them of their shared steppe heritage, the Mongols convinced the Turkic feudal Lords and, having received the promised treasures, they left the battlefield. Yuri, who was wounded, left the battlefield through a nearby forest.

After the betrayal of the Kipchak Turkic khans, the balance of power changed in favor of the Mongols, and the North Caucasians alone had to courageously accept a second battle with a numerically superior enemy.

Soon after, the Mongols attacked the weak army, surrounded and destroyed it before executing all prisoners of war. The Durdzuks avoided complete defeat by breaking out of enemy lines and leaving the battlefield.

=== Hunt for the Kipchak Turks ===
Here, on the expanses of the steppe, the Genghisides deployed their cavalry, suddenly attacked the Kipchak Turks, killed whom they found, and "took away from them twice as much as they themselves brought." Crashing into the middle of the Turkic nomad camps of Ciscaucasia, they scattered them in different directions. Part of them rushed to the Caspian Sea, captured Derbent and broke into the Transcaucasus. The other part went to the shores of the Black and Azov Seas and turned to the Russian princes for help. "The rest fled to the swamps and to the tops of the mountains, leaving their land."
Russian chronicles also directly mention the destruction of the Circassian army.

== Aftermath ==
After meeting with an army led by Jochi, the reinforced Mongol army advanced towards Crimea, devastating the North Caucasus while doing so. Having arrived there, they plundered the city Sudak in the spring of 1223. Further advances and campaigns led to the Battle of the Kalka River, in which the Kipchak Turks which had previously fled the battlefield allied with the Russians. The joint army was defeated however. Travelling North, the Mongols eventually received a devastating defeat by the Volga Bulgars, leading to the end of the whole campaign and the return of the army to the Mongol Empire in 1224.

Although the battle ended in a victory for the Mongols, it did not allow them to gain a foothold in the region.

== See also ==
- Mongol invasions of Durdzuketi
- Battle of the Kalka River
- Mongol invasions of Georgia

== Sources ==
- Gabriel, Richard A. (2006). Genghis Khan's Greatest General: Subotai the Valiant. University of Oklahoma Press. pp. 1–164. ISBN 9780806137346.
- de Hartog, Leo (2004). Genghis Khan: Conqueror of the World. Bloomsbury Academic. pp. 1–230. ISBN 9781860649721.
- Хизриев, Х.А. ЧЕЧНЯ В ПЕРИОД ИНОЗЕМНЫХ НАШЕСТВИЙ (XIII-XV вв.) (in Russian). Грозный.
- Ангуни, Амин (2013). ГОСУДАРСТВЕННОСТЬ НАРОДА НОХЧИЙ (in Russian). Грозный: Бяццара Кхиэташуо (БК). pp. 1–96.
- Козин, С.А. (1941). Сокровенное сказание Юань Чао Би Ши (in Russian). Издательство Академии наук СССР. pp. 1–619.
