= Yury of Beloozero =

Prince of Beloozero from 1380 to 1389

Yury Vasilyevich

Prince of Beloozero
- Reign: 1380–1389
- Predecessor: Fyodor
- Successor: Dmitry
- Died: 1389
- House: Rurik

Yury Vasilyevich (Russian: Юрий Васильевич; died 1389) was Prince of Beloozero from 1380 until his death in 1389. He was the last appanage prince of Beloozero before it was passed to the Grand Principality of Moscow during the reign of Dmitry Donskoy.

== Reign ==
He was the son of Vasily Romanovich, prince of Sugorsk, and the grandson Roman of Beloozero. Following the childless death of Yury's uncle, Fyodor Romanovich, in 1380, the throne passed to him. He died in 1389, after which Beloozero was passed to the Grand Principality of Moscow under Dmitry Donskoy. Afterward, the principality was divided into several smaller appanage principalities. Dmitry gave Beloozero to his son Andrey, who in turn gave it to his son Dmitry. Following the latter's death, and with agreement, it was permanently incorporated into the Muscovite state during the reign of Ivan III.

== Sources ==
- Ryzhov, Konstantin (1999). "Юрий Васильевич". Все монархи мира. Россия: 600 кратких жизнеописаний (in Russian). Вече. pp. 534–535. ISBN 978-5-7838-0268-3.
- Feldbrugge, Ferdinand J. M. (2 October 2017). A History of Russian Law: From Ancient Times to the Council Code (Ulozhenie) of Tsar Aleksei Mikhailovich of 1649. BRILL. ISBN 978-90-04-35214-8.
- Vinogradov, A. (1918). "Ростовские и Белозерские удельные князья". Русский биографический словарь. Т. 17: Романова — Рясовский. Русский биографический словарь. pp. 182–211.
