= Konstantin Borisovich =

Prince of Rostov (1278–1288; 1294–1307)

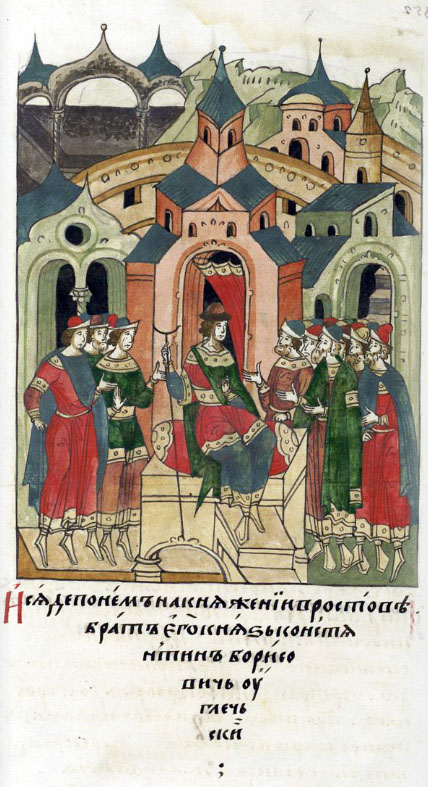
- Konstantin enthroned, miniature from the Illustrated Chronicle of Ivan the Terrible (16th century)

Prince of Rostov
- Reign: 1278–1288
- Predecessor: Dmitry
- Successor: Dmitry
- Reign: 1294–1307
- Predecessor: Dmitry
- Successor: Vasily

Prince of Uglich
- Reign: 1288–1294
- Predecessor: Dmitry
- Successor: Aleksandr
- Born: 1255
- Died: 1307 (aged 51–52)
- Issue more...: Vasily of Rostov
- House: Rurik
- Father: Boris of Rostov

Konstantin Borisovich (Russian: Константин Борисович; 1255–1307) was Prince of Rostov from 1278 to 1288 and again from 1294 until his death in 1307. He was also Prince of Uglich from 1288 to 1294. He was one of the three sons of Boris Vasilkovich.

== Reign ==
Konstantin Borisovich was born in 1255. He was one of the three sons of Boris Vasilkovich. In 1277, he accompanied his mother and his elder brother Dmitry during a visit to the Golden Horde. Dmitry carried the body of their father back home, while Konstantin took part in the Mongol campaign against the Alans along with Mengu-Timur.

Following the death of Gleb of Beloozero in 1278, Dmitry and Konstantin became the joint rulers of Rostov. However, Dmitry was not satisfied with this arrangement, which led to conflict between the two brothers. Dmitry had control of Rostov, but in 1285, his cousin Roman Vladimirovich died without heirs. As a result, Dmitry received Uglich and was forced by Tode Mongke to give Rostov to Konstantin. In 1288, Dmitry drove Konstantin out of Rostov with the support of Grand Prince Dmitry Aleksandrovich and exiled him to Uglich.

In 1294, his elder brother Dmitry died without an heir, and Konstantin again became the prince of Rostov. He remained the prince of Rostov until his death in 1307.

== Family ==
In 1302, Konstantin married a Tatar princess. From his first marriage he had two sons: Aleksandr and Vasily, prince of Rostov. From his second marriage he had a daughter.

== Sources ==
- Boguslavsky, Vladimir V.; Kuksina, Elena I. (2001). "Константин Борисович". Славянская энциклопедия. Киевская Русь — Московия. Т. 1: А–М (in Russian). Moskva: ОЛМА Медиа Групп. pp. 591–592. ISBN 9785224022502.
- Feldbrugge, Ferdinand J. M. (2 October 2017). A History of Russian Law: From Ancient Times to the Council Code (Ulozhenie) of Tsar Aleksei Mikhailovich of 1649. BRILL. ISBN 978-90-04-35214-8.
- Fennell, John (13 October 2014) [1983]. The Crisis of Medieval Russia 1200-1304. Routledge. ISBN 978-1-317-87314-3.
