= Constantine Esperovich Beloselsky-Belozersky =

Russian general, landowner and horse breeder (1843–1920)

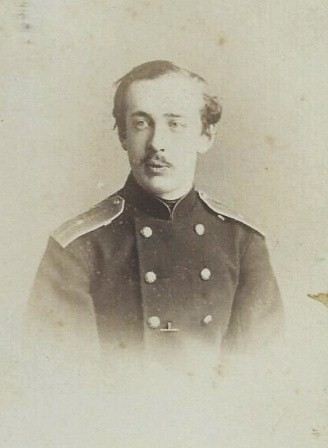
- Photograph of Constantine Esperovich Beloselsky-Belozersky by Sergey Lvovich Levitsky
- Born: Prince Constantine Esperovich Beloselsky-Belozersky; 28 June [O.S. 16 June] 1843; Paris, France
- Died: 26 May 1920; Neuilly-sur-Seine, France
- Noble family: Belosselsky-Belozersky
- Spouse: Nadezhda Dmitrievna Skobeleva
- Issue: Sergei; Elena; Esper; Olga
- Father: Prince Esper Alexandrovitch Beloselsky-Belozersky
- Mother: Elena Pavlovna Bibikova

Prince Constantine Esperovich Beloselsky-Belozersky (28 June [O.S. 16 June] 1843 – 26 May 1920, Neuilly-sur-Seine) was a Russian general, landowner and horse breeder.

== Biography ==
He was born on 16 June 1843 to Prince Esper Alexandrovitch Beloselsky-Belozersky and Elena Pavlovna Bibikova (1812–1888). He received education at home and entered into service in the Chevalier Guard Regiment on 9 December 1861. Beloselsky-Belozersky held the ranks of Lt. Col. Army (1882), Colonel (1884), Major-General (1894), Lieutenant-General (1906) and Adjutant General (1906).

From 1866 to 1868, he served as adjutant chief of police. In 1868 Beloselsky-Belozersky retired, but in 1877 he returned to service. He served as ADC to the Chief of Staff of the Guards Corps (1877-1881).

Beloselsky-Belozersky participated in the Russo-Turkish War of 1877-1878. In 1881 he was for a short time adjutant to the Tsarevich, the future Emperor Alexander III.

In 1895 he went to the reserve, and in 1896 returned to service in the rank of major general on enrolling in a retinue of His Imperial Majesty. He was a member of the Board of the Main Directorate of horse breeding.

According to the newspaper "Vedomosti Exchange", in 1908 the Prince converted from Orthodoxy to Catholicism.

Beloselsky-Belozersky retired from service on 16 April 1917 due to illness.

After the Revolution he emigrated to France.

Beloselsky-Belozersky died on 26 May 1920 in Neuilly-sur-Seine.

== Family ==
He was married to Nadezhda Dmitrievna Skobeleva (1847-1920), sister of Gen. Mikhail Skobelev. Their children were: Sergei Belosselsky-Belozersky (1867-1951), Elena (1869-1944), Esper Konstantinovich Belosselsky-Belozersky (1871-1921), and Olga (1874-1923), who married Prince Vladimir Nikolayevich Orlov.

== Awards ==
- Order of St. Stanislas 3rd degree. (1867)
- Order of St. Anne's 3rd degree. (1879)
- Order of St. Anne's 2nd degree. (1887)
- Order of St. Vladimir 3rd century. (1890)
- Order of St. Stanislaus of the 1st degree. (1899)
- Order of St. Anne 1st degree. (1903)
- Order of St. Vladimir of the 2nd degree. (1907)
- Order of White Eagle (1912)
- Order of St. Alexander Nevsky (12/06/1914)
- Knight Grand Cross of the Royal Victorian Order (United Kingdom)
- Grand Officer of the Legion of Honor (France)
