= Boris of Rostov =

Prince of Rostov from 1238 to 1277

Boris Vasilkovich
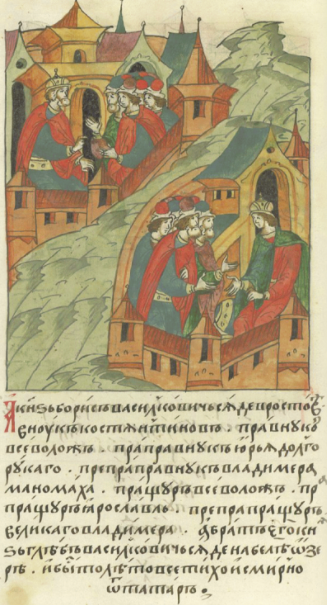
- Boris and Gleb sit in their estates, miniature from the Illustrated Chronicle of Ivan the Terrible (16th century)

Prince of Rostov
- Reign: 1238–1277
- Predecessor: Vasilko
- Successor: Gleb
- Died: 1277
- Issue more...: Dmitry of Rostov; Konstantin of Rostov
- House: Rurik
- Father: Vasilko of Rostov
- Mother: Maria of Chernigov

Boris Vasilkovich (Russian: Борис Василькович; 1231–1277) was Prince of Rostov from 1238 until his death in 1277. He was the elder of the two sons of Vasilko Konstantinovich.

== Reign ==
Boris was born in 1231. He was the elder of the two sons of Vasilko Konstantinovich and his wife Maria of Chernigov. His father was killed at the battle of Sit River in 1238, and Boris ascended the throne of Rostov along with his younger brother Gleb. In 1244, Boris received the charter for the throne from Batu Khan.

Boris visited Sartak Khan twice, in 1245 and 1250, and bestowed gifts upon Ulaghchi in 1256 and 1257. Following his trip to the Golden Horde in 1258, he accompanied the Mongol census-takers to Novgorod. In 1277, at the request of the khan Mengu-Timur, Boris took part in the Mongol campaign against the Alans; however, he fell ill and died on 16 September. He was buried in the Assumption Cathedral in Rostov. His younger brother Gleb, who had received Beloozero as an appanage, succeeded him in Rostov; however, he died a year later, and Boris's two eldest sons, Dmitry and Konstantin, became joint rulers.

== Family ==
In 1248, Boris married Maria Yaroslavna of Murom. They had three sons: Dmitry, Konstantin, and Vasily.

== Sources ==
- "Борис Василькович" . Brockhaus and Efron Encyclopedic Dictionary (in Russian). 1906.
- Boguslavsky, Vladimir V.; Kuksina, Elena I. (2001). "Борис Василькович". Славянская энциклопедия. Киевская Русь — Московия. Т. 1: А–М (in Russian). Moskva: ОЛМА Медиа Групп. p. 101. ISBN 9785224022502.
- Feldbrugge, Ferdinand J. M. (2 October 2017). A History of Russian Law: From Ancient Times to the Council Code (Ulozhenie) of Tsar Aleksei Mikhailovich of 1649. BRILL. ISBN 978-90-04-35214-8.
- Fennell, John (13 October 2014) [1983]. The Crisis of Medieval Russia 1200-1304. Routledge. ISBN 978-1-317-87314-3.
