= Fyodor I of Beloozero =

Prince of Beloozero from 1339 to 1380

Fyodor Mikhailovich

Prince of Beloozero
- Reign: 1293–1314
- Predecessor: Mikhail
- Successor: Roman
- Died: 1314
- House: Rurik
- Father: Mikhail of Beloozero

Fyodor Mikhailovich (Russian: Фёдор Михайлович; died 1314) was Prince of Beloozero from 1293 until his death in 1314.

== Reign ==
He was the son of Mikhail Glebovich from his marriage to a daughter of Fyodor Rostislavich. In 1293, following the death of his father, he assumed the throne of Beloozero. He likely died childless.

== Family ==
In 1302, he married a daughter of Velblasmysh of the Golden Horde. In 1314, he married a daughter of Dmitry Zhidimirich, a boyar (noble) of Novgorod.

== Sources ==
- Ryzhov, Konstantin (1999). "Фёдор Михайлович". Все монархи мира. Россия: 600 кратких жизнеописаний (in Russian). Вече. p. 528. ISBN 978-5-7838-0268-3.
- Feldbrugge, Ferdinand J. M. (2 October 2017). A History of Russian Law: From Ancient Times to the Council Code (Ulozhenie) of Tsar Aleksei Mikhailovich of 1649. BRILL. ISBN 978-90-04-35214-8.
- Fennell, John (13 October 2014) [1983]. The Crisis of Medieval Russia 1200-1304. Routledge. ISBN 978-1-317-87314-3.
- Vinogradov, A. (1918). "Ростовские и Белозерские удельные князья". Русский биографический словарь. Т. 17: Романова — Рясовский. Русский биографический словарь. pp. 182–211.
