= Daniel of Moscow =

Prince of Moscow (1261–1303)

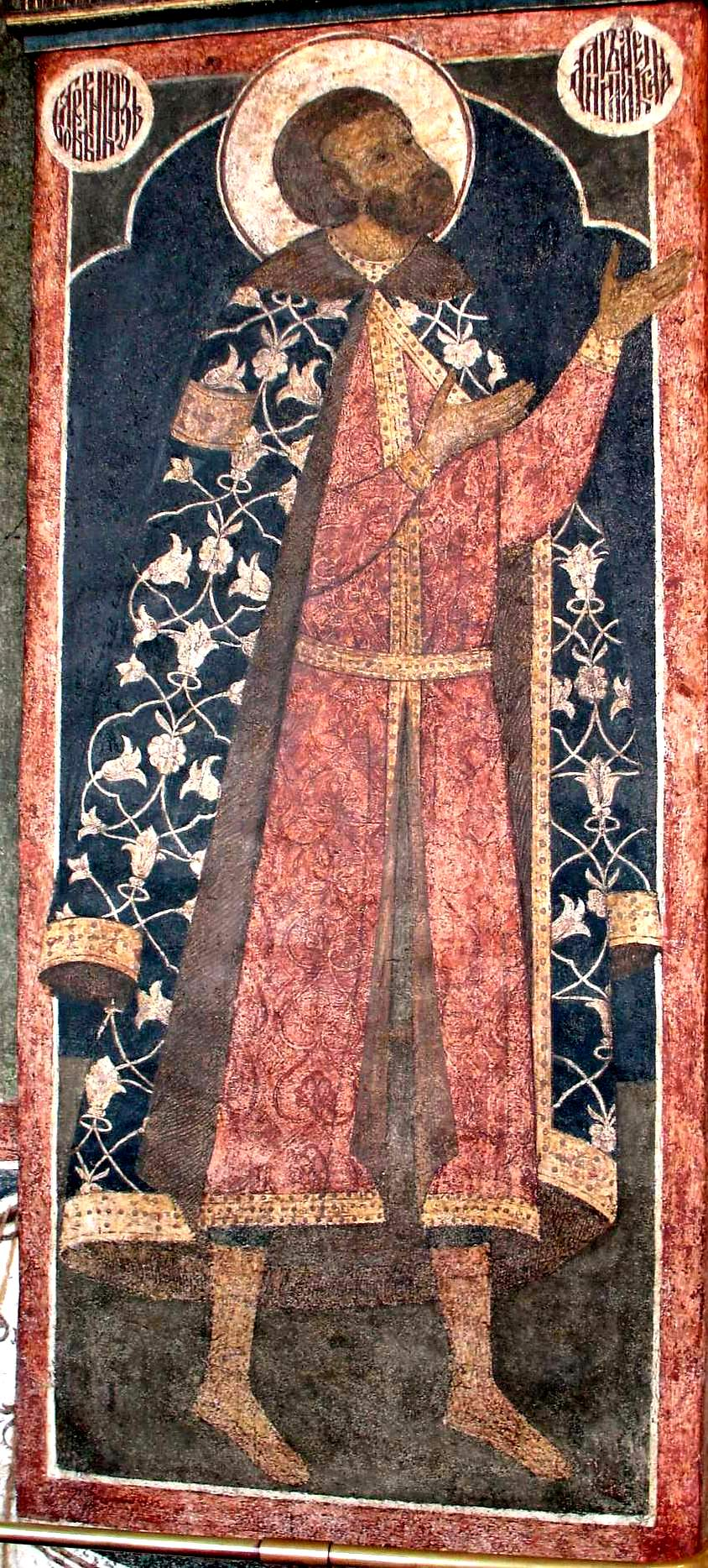
- Depiction of Daniel from 1551

Prince of Moscow
- Reign: 1282 – 5 March 1303
- Successor: Yuri I
- Born: late 1261; Vladimir, Vladimir-Suzdal principality
- Died: 4 March 1303 (aged 41); Moscow, Grand Duchy of Moscow
- Burial: Cathedral of the Archangel
- Consort: Maria Glebovna Belozerskaya
- Issue: Yury of Moscow; Aleksandr; Boris of Kostroma; Afanasy of Novgorod; Fedora; Ivan I of Moscow
- House: Rurikids (main dynasty name); Yurievichi (sub-name); Daniilovichi (founder)
- Father: Alexander Nevsky
- Mother: Alexandra Bryachislavna of Polotsk
- Religion: Russian Orthodox Church

Saint Daniel of Moscow
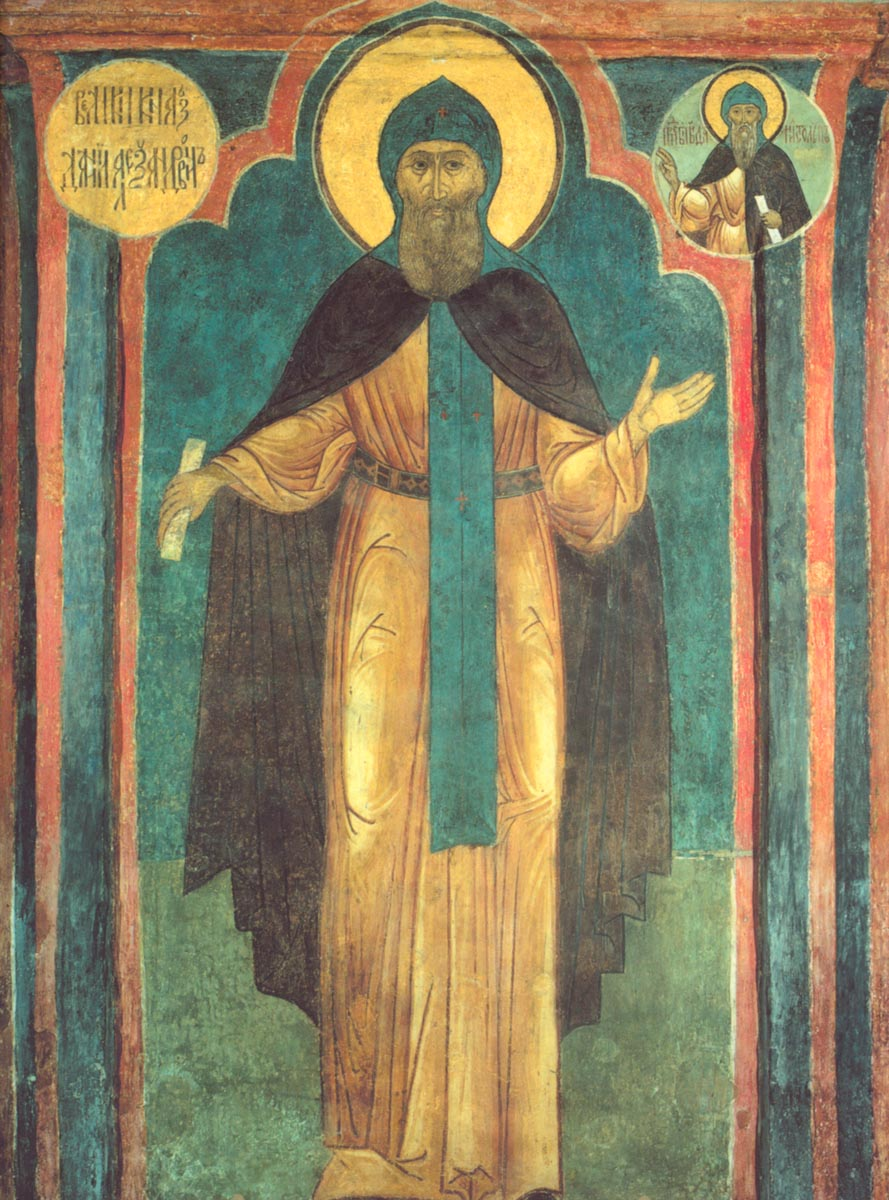
- Fresco in the Cathedral of the Archangel, Moscow

Holy and right-believing Prince
- Born: 1261; Vladimir
- Died: 4 March 1303
- Venerated in: Russian Orthodox Church
- Canonized: 1791 by Russian Orthodox Church
- Major shrine
- Burial place: Cemetery of Danilov (Russian: Даниловское кладбище)
- Feast: 17 March; 12 September
- Patronage: Russian Engineer Troops

Daniil Aleksandrovich (Russian: Даниил Александрович; 1261 – 5 March 1303), also known as Daniil of Moscow, was the youngest son of Alexander Nevsky and forefather of all Princes of Moscow. His descendants are known as the Daniilovichi. He has been locally approved for veneration in the Russian Orthodox Church, with feast days on 17 March and 12 September.

== Early life ==
Daniil was born in late 1261, at Vladimir on the Klyazma, capital of Vladimir-Suzdal. He was the fourth and youngest son of Alexander Nevsky and his second wife, Princess Vassa. He was named after Daniel the Stylite.

His father Alexander died on 14 November 1263, when Daniil was only two years old. Of his father's patrimonies, he received the least valuable, Moscow, and reigned under the regency by his paternal uncle, Prince Yaroslav of Tver. Yaroslav died in 1271, but Daniil does not appear to have become an independent ruler until 1282.

== Government ==
Daniil has been credited with founding the first Moscow monasteries, namely the Epiphany Monastery and the Danilov Monastery (Saint Daniel Monastery) situated on the right bank of the Moskva River, at a distance of 5 miles from the Moscow Kremlin, as the first monastery wooden church no later than 1282. He also built the first stone church in the Moscow Kremlin in the 1280s, dedicated to the Demetrius of Thessaloniki.

=== Struggle for Vladimir ===
Daniil took part in his brothers' — Dmitri of Pereslavl (Pereslavl-Zalessky) and Andrey of Gorodets — struggle for the right to govern Vladimir-Suzdal and Nizhny Novgorod, respectively.

The Mongol warlords Nogai Khan and Tokhta grew in power in the late 1280s, and in 1291 they jointly conquered Sarai, capital of the Golden Horde. However, in 1293 Nogai and Tokhta got into war with each other, and were appealing to the Rus' princes (who were themselves in conflict over the title of Grand Prince of Vladimir) to join their side against the other. Prince Andrey of Gorodets and Kostroma, prince Theodore the Black (Fedor/Fyodor) of Yaroslavl, and the Rostov princes made the journey to Sarai in order to pay homage to Tokhta, and receive confirmation of their yarliks (patents). Prince Dmitry of Pereslavl (who in the early 1280s had ousted Andrey from Vladimir and Nizhny Novgorod with the support of the army of Nogai, becoming his vassal) and his supporters prince Mikhail of Tver and prince Daniil of Moscow refused to travel to Sarai and recognise Tokhta. In response, Tokhta and his Rus' allies Andrey and Theodore conducted a punitive expedition against the Rus' allies of Nogai, attacking the cities of Vladimir, Moscow and Tver, and devastating the countryside. Dmitry fled once again, but it was not until he died in 1294 that the Vladimir throne dispute was resolved in favour of Andrey.

=== Struggle for Pereslavl-Zalessky ===
After Dmitry's death in 1294, Daniil made an alliance with Mikhail of Tver and Ivan of Pereslavl-Zalessky (Dmitry's son) against Andrey of Gorodets of Novgorod, who was allied with the new khan Tokhta. The main conflict in the following years would be over the question whether Andrey had the right to reign over Pereslavl-Zalessky as Grand Prince of Vladimir, or whether it was an appanage which was inherited from father (Dmitry) to son (Ivan Dmitrevich). In the assembly of 1296 (or congress of 1297), the Rus' princes as well as Tokhta's representative Nevrui (or Ivrui) and the bishop of Sarai deliberated on the issue. Ivan Dmitrevich won the argument with the support of Mikhail of Tver and Daniil of Moscow, against Andrey, supported by Theodore (Feodor) of Yaroslavl and Konstantin of Ryazan. Later in 1296, and again in 1298, Andrey unsuccessfully tried to seize Pereslavl-Zalessky by force anyway, but was repelled both times with the support of the Tverians and Muscovites. It was the last time Moscow and Tver found themselves on the same side in a conflict. The 14th century would be dominated by a fierce struggle for control of Vladimir-Suzdalia between the Muscovite Daniilovichi and the Tverian Yaroslavichi.

Konstantin, the prince of Ryazan, tried to capture the Moscow lands with the help of a Mongol force. Prince Daniil defeated it near Pereslavl.

=== Final years ===
In 1301, he went to Ryazan with an army and imprisoned the ruler of the Ryazan Principality "by some ruse", as the chronicle says, and destroyed a multitude of Tatars. To secure his release, the prisoner ceded to Daniil his fortress of Kolomna. It was an important acquisition, as now Daniil controlled all the length of the Moskva River.

In 1302 his childless nephew and ally, Ivan of Pereslavl, bequeathed to Daniil all his lands, including Pereslavl-Zalessky.

== Death ==
At the age of 42 on 5 March 1303 Daniil died. He never became grand prince of Vladimir, which meant that according to traditional Rus' succession practices, his son and successor Yury of Moscow had no legitimate claim to the throne of Vladimir. This is why Khan Tokhta granted Mikhail of Tver the Vladimirian grand princely title when Andrey of Gorodets died the next year (27 July 1304).

== Canonisation ==
Before his death he became a monk and, according to his will, was buried in the cemetery of the Saint Daniel Monastery. This was a common cemetery and by being buried there he was demonstrating humility. He was canonized by the Russian Orthodox Church in 1791 but only for local veneration.

In the year 1330, the monastery was moved to the Kremlin and the monastery was turned into a common parish. The cemetery became open to the public and his grave was lost. On 30 August 1652, many relics from Daniil of Moscow were found and were placed in a tomb in the Danilov Monastery in his honor.

== Marriage and children ==
His wife was named Maria Glebovna Belozerskaya, a daughter of Gleb of Beloozero and direct descendant of Genghis Khan and also the Rurikids. They had at least six children:

- Yury of Moscow (1281 – 21 September 1325);
- Aleksandr Daniilovich (died Autumn 1308);
- Boris Daniilovich, Prince of Kostroma (died 1320);
- Afanasy Daniilovich, Prince of Novgorod (died 1322);
- Fedora Daniilovna. Married Yaroslav Romanovich, Prince of Ryazan (died 1299);
- Ivan I of Moscow (1288 – 31 March 1340).

Yurievichi connection of Moscow, Novgorod-Suzdal, and Tver

Yaroslav II of Vladimir; G. P. of Vladimir (1238–1246); Grandson of Yurievichi progenitor Yuri Dolgorukiy
Alexander Nevsky; Prince of Novgorod (~1246~1259); G. P. of Vladimir (1252–1263)	Andrey II of Vladimir; Prince of Suzdal (1256–1264); G. P. of Vladimir (1249–1252)	Yaroslav of Tver; Prince of Tver (1247–1271); G. P. of Vladimir (1263–1271)
Daniel of Moscow; Prince of Moscow (1283–1303); Daniilovichi progenitor	Konstantin of Suzdal; Prince of Nizhny; Novgorod-Suzdal (1341–1355)	Mikhail of Tver; Prince of Tver (1285–1318); G. P. of Vladimir (1304–1318)

== See also ==
- Family tree of Russian monarchs

== Bibliography ==
- Halperin, Charles J. (1987). Russia and the Golden Horde: The Mongol Impact on Medieval Russian History. E-book. Indiana University. p. 222. ISBN 9781850430575.
- Martin, Janet (2007). Medieval Russia: 980–1584. Second Edition. E-book. Cambridge: Cambridge University Press. ISBN 978-0-511-36800-4.

Regnal titles
Preceded by Boris Mikhailovich (?)	Prince of Moscow; 1282 – 1303	Succeeded by Yury
