= Vasily of Rostov =

Prince of Rostov from 1307 to 1316

Vasily Konstantinovich

Prince of Rostov
- Reign: 1307–1316
- Predecessor: Konstantin
- Born: 1291
- Died: 1316 (aged 24–25)
- House: Rurik
- Father: Konstantin of Rostov

Vasily Konstantinovich (Russian: Василий Константинович; 1291–1316) was Prince of Rostov from 1307 until his death in 1316. He was the younger of the two sons of Konstantin Borisovich.

== Reign ==
Vasily Konstantinovich was born in 1291. He was the younger of the two sons of Konstantin Borisovich. His father died in 1307. In 1316, he was mentioned by a Russian chronicler as having returned with the Tatar ambassadors Kazanchy and Sabanchy, who "did much evil to Rostov". Vasily died the same year.

Information about Rostov is scarce during this period, but it appears to have been connected to the struggle between Mikhail of Tver and Yury of Moscow for the throne of the Grand Principality of Vladimir.

== Family ==
He had two sons: Fyodor and Konstantin. According to later genealogical books, Vasily's two sons divided the principality into two halves in 1328 following Konstantin's marriage to Maria, a daughter of Ivan I of Moscow.

== Sources ==
- "Василий Константинович, князь ростовский, сын Константина Борисовича" . Brockhaus and Efron Encyclopedic Dictionary (in Russian). 1906.
- Boguslavsky, Vladimir V.; Kuksina, Elena I. (2001). "Василий Константинович". Славянская энциклопедия. Киевская Русь — Московия. Т. 1: А–М (in Russian). Moskva: ОЛМА Медиа Групп. p. 149. ISBN 9785224022502.
- Feldbrugge, Ferdinand J. M. (2 October 2017). A History of Russian Law: From Ancient Times to the Council Code (Ulozhenie) of Tsar Aleksei Mikhailovich of 1649. BRILL. ISBN 978-90-04-35214-8.
- Fennell, John L. I. (15 November 2023) [1968]. The Emergence of Moscow, 1304–1359. University of California Press. ISBN 978-0-520-34759-5.
