= Mongol invasion of Circassia =

Mongol conquest of Northern Caucasia

- Part of the Mongol invasions and conquests
Date	1237
Location	Circassia
Territorial changes	Circassian and Alan plains fell to the Mongols; Coastal and mountainous Circassia remained independent

Belligerents
Mongol Empire	Zichia (Circassia); Kingdom of Alania

Commanders and leaders
Ögedei Khan	Tuqar †; Tuqbash †; Khour I

Strength
200,000	Unknown

The Mongol invasion of Circassia and Alania was the invasion of Zichia (Circassia) and Alania by the Mongol Empire in 1237. William of Rubruck, who travelled to the Caucasus in 1253, wrote that the Circassians had never "bowed to Mongol rule", despite the fact that a whole fifth of the Mongol armies were at that time devoted to the task of crushing the Alano-Circassian resistance. Circassians and Alans made use of both the forests and the mountains, and waged a successful guerrilla war, maintaining their freedom to some extent.

== Prelude ==
During what was the late Middle Ages of Western Europe, the Caucasus was invaded by Mongols and their Turkic vassals. The first appearance of Mongol troops in the Caucasus was an arrival of scouts between 1220 and 1222. Kypchak Turkic peoples – some of which became future affiliates of Genghis Khan – had been invading and settling areas further and further South and West (a process that had continued since the fall of the Khazars), including the fertile river valleys of the Terek and the Kuban. In the 1230s, the Mongols gained rule over the Kypchaks, and turned them into vassals. The Circassians dominated the north and south of the Kuban river before the Mongol arrival.

== Mongol Invasion ==
In 1237, the assault on the North Caucasus began. Mongols launched the first attacks: against the Circassians and the Alans. The king of the Circassians, Tuqar, was killed in battle against the Mongols.

The people of the Caucasus proved no match for the arrows and flames of the Mongols, and their villages were totally destroyed. The Northern Caucasus was mostly invaded, but its resistant people survived up in the mountains. Those remaining joined their mountainous brethren in the highlands (lowland Circassians and Alans fled to the Circassian and Alan highlands of Caucasus), fleeing out of lack of an alternative. They regrouped in the mountains and reorganized themselves, planning a counterattack on the Turkic and Mongol invaders. Their goal was to survive both biologically and culturally.

They had both the forests and the mountains on their side, and waged a successful guerrilla war.

William of Rubruck, the emissary of the Kingdom of France to Sartaq Khan (son of Batu) travelled to the Caucasus in 1253. He wrote that the Circassians had never "bowed to Mongol rule", despite the fact that whole fifth of the Mongol armies were at that time devoted to the task of crushing their resistance.

== Long-term effects of the Mongol invasions ==
=== Cultural effects ===
The concept of mythical beast known as the "almasti", an evil forest creature with enchanted hair, also dates to Mongol influence with the word almasti being a loan from Mongolian where it originally meant "forest-man"; Jaimoukha also proposes that the Mongol name may have become used in the place of a native name during the sojourn of the Golden Horde over Simsim.

== See also ==
- Mongol invasion of Alania
- Mongol invasions of Durdzuketi
- Mongol invasions of Georgia
