= Fyodor II of Beloozero =

Prince of Beloozero from 1339 to 1380

Fyodor Romanovich

Prince of Beloozero
- Reign: 1339–1380
- Predecessor: Roman
- Successor: Yury
- Died: 1380
- House: Rurik
- Father: Roman of Beloozero

Fyodor Romanovich (Russian: Фёдор Романович; died 1380) was Prince of Beloozero from around 1339 until his death in 1380. He was the elder of the two sons of Roman Mikhailovich.

== Reign ==
Fyodor Romanovich was the elder of the two sons of Roman Mikhailovich. Russian chronicles only mention him twice, in 1375, when he and his detachment marched with the army of Dmitry Donskoy against Tver, and in 1380, when he died at the Battle of Kulikovo, along with his only son, Ivan. After his death, Beloozero was passed to his nephew Yury Vasilyevich, the last appanage prince of Beloozero before it was passed to the Grand Principality of Moscow.

== Family ==
He was married to Feodosia, a daughter of Ivan I of Moscow. They had one son, Ivan. The wedding has been dated to 1339–1340 and some historians have argued that a compact was drawn up between Fyodor and Ivan: "The marriage of the grand prince's daughter to the prince of a weak udel meant the still greater submission of the latter. The udel was subjected to Moscow [...] This was probably what was half a century later called 'the purchase' of Ivan Kalita."

== Sources ==
- Boguslavsky, Vladimir V.; Kuksina, Elena I. (2001). "Фёдор Романович". Славянская энциклопедия. Киевская Русь — Московия. Т. 2: Н—Я (in Russian). Moskva: ОЛМА Медиа Групп. p. 584. ISBN 978-5-224-02251-9.
- Feldbrugge, Ferdinand J. M. (2 October 2017). A History of Russian Law: From Ancient Times to the Council Code (Ulozhenie) of Tsar Aleksei Mikhailovich of 1649. BRILL. ISBN 978-90-04-35214-8.
- Fennell, John L. I. (15 November 2023) [1968]. The Emergence of Moscow, 1304–1359. University of California Press. ISBN 978-0-520-34759-5.
- Vinogradov, A. (1918). "Ростовские и Белозерские удельные князья". Русский биографический словарь. Т. 17: Романова — Рясовский. Русский биографический словарь. pp. 182–211.
