= Mikhail of Beloozero =

Prince of Beloozero (r. 1278–1279; 1283–1293)

Mikhail Glebovich
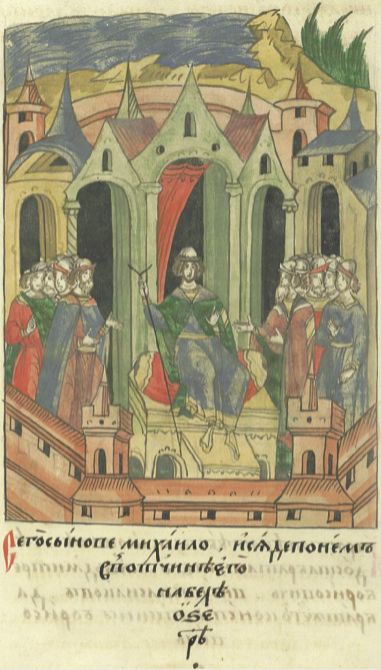
- Mikhail enthroned, miniature from the Illustrated Chronicle of Ivan the Terrible (16th century)

Prince of Beloozero
- Reign: 1278–1279
- Predecessor: Gleb
- Successor: Dmitry
- Reign: 1286–1293
- Predecessor: Dmitry
- Successor: Fyodor
- Born: 1263
- Died: 1293 (aged 29–30)
- Issue more...: Fyodor I of Beloozero; Roman of Beloozero
- House: Rurik
- Father: Gleb of Beloozero

Mikhail Glebovich (Russian: Михаил Глебович; 1263–1293) was Prince of Beloozero from 1278 to 1279 and again from 1283 until his death in 1293. He was the second son of Gleb Vasilkovich.

== Reign ==
Mikhail Glebovich was born in 1263. He was the second son of Gleb Vasilkovich.

In 1277, together with his father and other Russian princes, he took part in the Mongol campaign against the Alans. He also assisted the Mongols in crushing an uprising in Bulgaria. Following his father's death in 1278, he received Beloozero; however, it was seized by Dmitry Borisovich the following year. In 1286, the principality was returned to him. In 1290, Mikhail joined Andrey Aleksandrovich's campaign against the latter's brother Dmitry for the throne of the Grand Principality of Vladimir. He accompanied the other princes during a visit to the Golden Horde in 1293 but died there.

== Family ==
He married a daughter of Fyodor Rostislavich. They had two sons: Fyodor and Roman, princes of Beloozero.

== Sources ==
- Boguslavsky, Vladimir V.; Kuksina, Elena I. (2001). "Михаил Глебович". Славянская энциклопедия. Киевская Русь — Московия. Т. 1: А–М (in Russian). Moskva: ОЛМА Медиа Групп. p. 729. ISBN 9785224022502.
- Feldbrugge, Ferdinand J. M. (2 October 2017). A History of Russian Law: From Ancient Times to the Council Code (Ulozhenie) of Tsar Aleksei Mikhailovich of 1649. BRILL. ISBN 978-90-04-35214-8.
- Fennell, John (13 October 2014) [1983]. The Crisis of Medieval Russia 1200-1304. Routledge. ISBN 978-1-317-87314-3.
