= Boris Mikhailovich =

13th-century Russian nobleman

Boris Mikhailovich (Russian: Борис Михайлович) was a Russian nobleman. As the son of Mikhail Khorobrit, he is, controversially, considered by some to have been the prince of Moscow from 1248 to 1263, preceding Daniel of Moscow, who is usually considered to have been the first prince of Moscow.

== Life ==
Boris was the son of Mikhail Yaroslavich Khorobrit, who was the younger brother of Aleksandr Nevsky, and would thus have been Daniel's uncle. Boris' father was briefly the grand prince of Vladimir in 1248, but Boris never seems to have held that title. Following Boris' death, Daniel received Moscow and his first activity as prince of Moscow is mentioned under the year 1283.

== See also ==
- Bibliography of Russian history (1223–1613)
- Family tree of Russian monarchs

Preceded by Mikhail Khorobrit (?)	Prince of Moscow	Succeeded by Daniel of Moscow
