= Sergei Belosselsky-Belozersky =

Russian aristocrat and general (1867–1951)

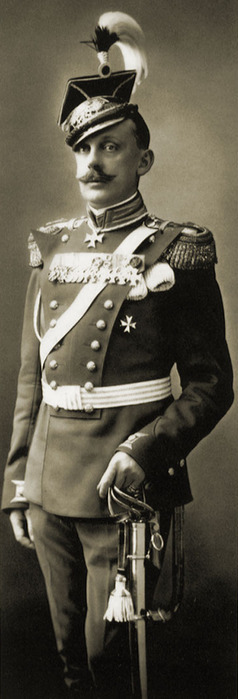
- Sergei Belosselsky-Belozersky
- Born: 25 July 1867; Russian Empire
- Died: 20 April 1951 (aged 83) Tonbridge, England
- Allegiance: Russia
- Branch: Imperial Russian Army
- Service years: 1887–1918
- Rank: Lieutenant General
- Conflicts: World War I; Russian Civil War
- Awards: Order of St. Anna; Order of Saint Stanislaus; Order of Saint Vladimir

Prince Sergei Konstantinovich Belosselsky-Belozersky (Russian: Сергей Константинович Белосельский-Белозерский; 25 July 1867 – 20 April 1951) was a Russian aristocrat, general and member of the International Olympic Committee.

== Early life ==
Prince Sergei was a member of the Belosselsky-Belozersky family and was in 1916 one of the largest landowners in Russia. He was the son of general Constantine Esperovich Beloselsky-Belozersky (Konstantin Esperovich Belosselsky-Belozersky; 1843–1920) and the former Nadezhna Dmitrovna Skobeleva (1847–1920), sister of general Mikhail Skobelev.

== Career ==
Sergei graduated from the Imperial Cadet Corps in 1887 and was gazetted as a cornet in the Life Guards. He was attached to the Russian embassies in Berlin and Paris. He left military service in 1894 but returned in 1895. Between 1896 and 1905, he served as aide-de-camp to Grand Duke Vladimir Alexandrovich of Russia.

From 1908, he commanded the 3rd Novorossiysk dragoon regiment and from 1913, the Uhlans (Lancers) of the Imperial Guard. He owned an estate on Krestovsky Island, where, in 1908, Nicolai, brother of Felix Yusupov, was killed in a duel with a jealous husband.

During World War I, he commanded the 2nd Guards Cavalry Division and the 3rd Don Cavalry Division. From 1915, he served on the Caucasus front under General Nikolai Baratov.

In 1917, he joined the white movement and served on the staff of White Finnish leader, Carl Gustaf Emil Mannerheim during the Russian Civil War. He was subsequently a staff officer in the North Western Army of General Yudenich. After the end of the Civil War Prince Sergei settled in England and died in Tonbridge, where he befriended Denton Welch, in 1951. His open coffin lay in state in Tonbridge Parish Church the night before the funeral, in accordance with Russian Orthodox tradition, permission having been granted by canon Russell White.

Prince Sergei was a keen sportsman. He was one of the founders of the St Petersburg Sports Club and was Russian representative on the International Olympic Committee between 1900 and 1908.

== Personal life ==
In 1894, Prince Sergei married Susan Tucker Whittier (1874–1934), daughter of Charles A. Whittier of Boston. Together, Sergei and Susan were the parents of two children:

- Sergei "Serge" Sergeivich Belosselsky-Belozersky (1895–1978), who married in November 1943 Florence Crane Robinson (1890–1969), the former wife of William Albert Robinson, navigator and philanthropist, and daughter of Richard T. Crane Jr.
- Andrei "Andre" Sergeivich Belosselsky-Belozersky (1909–1961), a bachelor who was head of the "incoming news section" of the BBC.

Belosselsky-Belozersky died on April 20, 1951, in Tonbridge, Kent, England.
