= Prince of Beloozero =

Monarch during a period of Russian history

The Prince of Beloozero (Russian: князь белоозерский) was the title of the ruler of the Principality of Beloozero.

== History ==
Before 1238, it formed part of the Principality of Rostov, which also included the lands around Yaroslavl, Uglich and Ustyug. It was detachted from Rostov in 1238 when, following the death of Vasilko Konstantinovich, the prince of Rostov, his younger son Gleb Vasilkovich took Beloozero while his older son Boris Vasilkovich became his successor at Rostov.

The princedom gave rise to the princely noble surname of Belozersky (Russian: Белозерский). Subsequently, the only surviving branch of this Russian princely family (meaning direct male descendants) are the princes Belosselsky-Belozersky. Emperor Paul I gave this honor to Alexander Mikhailovich Belosselsky-Belozersky and his descendants.

== List of princes ==
- Gleb Vasilkovich, 1238–1278

Between death of Gleb and 1302, under rule of Dmitry Borisovich, Prince of Rostov

- Mikhail Glebovich, 1278–1293
- Fyodor Mikhaylovich, 1293–1314
- Roman Mikhaylovich, 1314–1339
- Ivan Kalita, 1328–1338, who had purchased the principality.
- Fyodor Romanovich, 1339–1380 (died at Kulikovo)
- Yury Vasilyevich (grandson of Roman), after 1380

Came into the hands of the ruler of Moscow, the Grand Prince of Vladimir Dmitry Donskoi, whose son Andrei, and his son Mikhail, remained nominal princes until its final annexation into the Muscovite state in 1485.

== Bibliography ==
- Martin, Janet, Medieval Russia, 980-1584, (Cambridge, 1995)
