= Andrey of Uglich =

Prince of Uglich from 1249 to 1261

Andrey Vladimirovich

Prince of Uglich
- Reign: 1249–1261
- Predecessor: Vladimir
- Successor: Roman
- Died: 1261
- House: Rurik
- Father: Vladimir of Uglich

Andrey Vladimirovich (Russian: Андрей Владимирович; died 1261) was Prince of Uglich from 1249 until his death in 1261.

== Family ==
He was the eldest son of Vladimir Konstantinovich, the first appanage prince of Uglich, from his marriage to Nadezhda Ingvarevna, a princess of Ryazan. Vladimir died in 1249; as he predeceased Sviatoslav, his children were barred from the title of grand prince of Vladimir, according to traditional succession practices.

== Sources ==
- Feldbrugge, Ferdinand J. M. (2 October 2017). A History of Russian Law: From Ancient Times to the Council Code (Ulozhenie) of Tsar Aleksei Mikhailovich of 1649. BRILL. ISBN 978-90-04-35214-8.
- Fennell, John L. I. (13 October 2014) [1983]. The Crisis of Medieval Russia 1200-1304. Routledge. ISBN 978-1-317-87314-3.
- Ryzhov, Konstantin (1999). "Андрей Владимирович". Все монархи мира. Россия: 600 кратких жизнеописаний (in Russian). Вече. pp. 90–91. ISBN 978-5-7838-0268-3.
