= Yury of Moscow =

Prince of Moscow (1303–1325)

Yury I
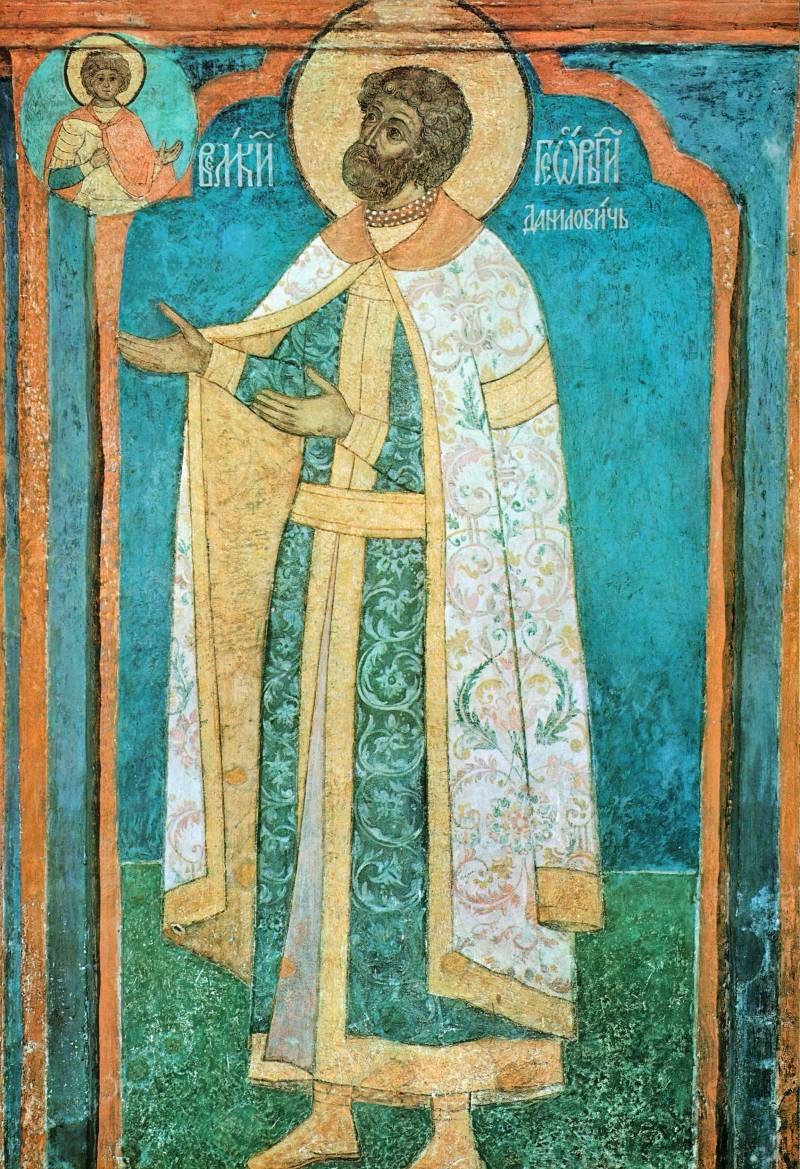
- Portrait from the Cathedral of the Archangel (17th century)

Prince of Moscow
- Reign: 1303–1325
- Predecessor: Daniel of Moscow
- Successor: Ivan I

Grand Prince of Vladimir
- Reign: 1318–1322
- Predecessor: Mikhail Yaroslavich
- Successor: Dmitry of Tver
- Born: 1281; Moscow, Principality of Moscow, Vladimir-Suzdal
- Died: November 21, 1325 (aged 44–45)
- Spouse: Konchaka
- Dynasty: Rurik
- Father: Daniel of Moscow
- Religion: Russian Orthodox

Yury (Georgy) Danilovich (Note: Also spelled Yuri Daniilovich) (Russian: Юрий (Георгий) Данилович; 1281 – 21 November 1325) was Prince of Moscow from 1303 to 1325 and Grand Prince of Vladimir from 1318 to 1322. He contested the title of Grand Prince of Vladimir with his uncle Mikhail of Tver. As Yury's father had never held the title, he had no legitimate claim. Despite two failed campaigns by Mikhail to subdue Yury, the latter allied with the Golden Horde and married the khan's sister Konchaka. However, he never had any children with her and was made grand prince after Mikhail's execution in 1318.

Yury III faced resistance and difficulties in collecting tribute for the Horde, prompting several punitive expeditions. In 1322, Mikhail's son Dmitry of Tver accused him of embezzlement and obtained the grand princely title. Dmitry also succeeded in killing Yury. Before his death, Yury led a campaign against the Swedes and founded a fort at the Neva River.

== Biography ==
=== Early life ===
Yury was the oldest son of Daniel of Moscow, the first prince of Moscow and progenitor of the Daniilovichi. His first military action was to defend Pereslavl-Zalessky against the grand prince of Vladimir, Andrey of Gorodets.

=== Conflict with Mikhail of Tver ===
After his father Daniel died in 1303, Yury became prince of Moscow, and contended over the title of grand prince of Vladimir (the supreme position among princes in the northeast) with his uncle Mikhail of Tver. Because Daniel had never been grand prince of Vladimir, his descendants, including his son Yury, had no legitimate claim to the throne of Vladimir according to traditional succession practices. This is why the Golden Horde's khan, Tokhta, granted Mikhail of Tver the grand princely title when Andrey of Gorodets died the next year on 27 July 1304. Mikhail went to the Golden Horde's capital city Sarai, where the khan elevated him grand prince. His nephew Yury rebelled against this appointment, but two military campaigns by Mikhail of Tver against Moscow in 1305 and 1308 forced Yury to comply with the khan's decision. The Tverian army besieged Pereslavl and Moscow itself.

In the meantime, Yury arranged the murder of Prince Konstantin of Ryazan. This unlucky ruler had been captured by Yury's father back in 1302 and had been incarcerated in Moscow since then. While Ryazan was shocked by such a barbarity, Yury annexed the key Ryazanian fortress of Kolomna to Moscow. He also captured Mozhaisk, which formerly belonged to the princes of Smolensk. By 1314, Yury secured backing from the Metropolitan Peter and formed a military alliance with Novgorod against Tver. Now, he felt strong enough to challenge Mikhail of Tver in the Horde.

In 1315, Yury went to the Golden Horde and, after spending two years there, constructed an alliance with Uzbeg Khan. Yury married the khan's sister Konchaka, a Tatar princess who converted to Russian Orthodox Christianity for her marriage to Yury, and adopted "Agafiia" as her baptismal name. Uzbeg Khan deposed Mikhail and nominated Yury as the Grand Prince of Vladimir. Back in Moscow with a large force of Tatars, Yury approached Tver. However, Yuri's army was defeated and his brother Boris and his wife were taken prisoners. Thereupon he fled to Novgorod and sued for peace. At that time his wife, still held in Tver as a hostage, died unexpectedly. Yury availed himself of the confusion that followed and announced to the khan that she had been poisoned on Mikhail's order. Uzbeg Khan summoned both princes to Sarai and, after a trial, had Mikhail executed on 22 November 1318. Yury, who both depended on and benefited from Uzbeg Khan's favour, was allowed to be the grand prince of Vladimir for the next four years (1318–1322).

=== Last years ===
Yury returned to Suzdalia in 1319, spending much time in Novgorod. He was fiercely resisted by other princes and populace alike, as his appointment to grand prince was considered illegitimate. Now entrusted with the task of gathering tribute to the Horde, Yury faced much opposition; Uzbeg sent no fewer than four punitive expeditions to the northeastern principalities of Rus' during Yury's last two years as grand prince (1320–1322) in order to enforce their joint authority. In particular, Mikhail's son and successor, Dmitry "the Terrible Eyes" of Tver, still opposed him. In 1322, Dmitry, seeking revenge for his father's murder, went to Sarai and persuaded the khan that Yury had appropriated a large portion of the tribute due to the Horde. Uzbek granted Dmitry the patent for grand prince of Vladimir. Yury was summoned to the Horde for a trial but, before any formal investigation, was killed by Dmitry. Eight months later, Dmitry was also executed in the Horde. In early 1326, Yury's remains were returned to Moscow and buried by the bishops of the Russian Orthodox Church headed by Metropolitan Peter.

Shortly before his death, Yury led the army of Novgorod to fight the Swedes and founded a fort in the mouth of the Neva River. Upon signing the Treaty of Orekhovo in 1323, Yury continued eastward and conquered Velikiy Ustyug the same year.

== Bibliography ==
- Halperin, Charles J. (1987). Russia and the Golden Horde: The Mongol Impact on Medieval Russian History. Indiana University. p. 222. ISBN 9781850430575. (e-book).
- Martin, Janet (2004). Medieval Russia: 980–1584. Cambridge: Cambridge University Press. ISBN 9780521368322. Archived from the original on 23 April 2023.
- Martin, Janet (2007). Medieval Russia: 980–1584. Second Edition. E-book. Cambridge: Cambridge University Press. ISBN 978-0-511-36800-4.

Regnal titles
Preceded by Daniel	Prince of Moscow; 1303–1325	Succeeded by Ivan I
Preceded by Mikhail of Tver	Grand Prince of Vladimir; 1318–1322	Succeeded by Dmitry of Tver
