= Roman of Beloozero =

Prince of Beloozero from 1314 to 1339

Roman Mikhailovich

Prince of Beloozero
- Reign: 1314 – after 1339
- Predecessor: Fyodor
- Successor: Fyodor
- Died: after 1339
- Issue more...: Fyodor II of Beloozero
- House: Rurik
- Father: Mikhail of Beloozero

Roman Mikhailovich (Russian: Роман Михайлович) was Prince of Beloozero from 1314 until after 1339. He was the younger of the two sons of Mikhail Glebovich.

== Reign ==
Roman Mikhailovich was the younger of the two sons of Gleb Vasilkovich.

He is only mentioned once in Russian chronicles, in 1339, when Roman went with Vasily of Yaroslavl to the Golden Horde to issue a complaint to Özbeg Khan about Ivan I of Moscow over his encroachment on their lands. According to the Novgorod First Chronicle, "at the advice of the grand prince", Vasily Davydovich was sent for at the time when Aleksandr of Tver was summoned, while the Trinity Chronicle includes the name of Roman.

According to the historian John L. I. Fennell: "There can be little doubt that both Vasily and Roman were summoned to the khan in order that they might be dealt with at the same time as Aleksandr of Tver'; indeed it would not be unreasonable to assume that they, and perhaps others too, formed an anti-Moscow bloc in support of Aleksandr and Gedimin".

It is unknown what happened to the two princes, but Ivan likely ended the crisis soon afterward as Roman's son Fyodor was married to Ivan's daughter Feodosia, while Vasily was married to another one of Ivan's daughters.

== Family ==
He had two sons: Fyodor, prince of Beloozero, and Vasily.

== Sources ==
- Boguslavsky, Vladimir V.; Kuksina, Elena I. (2001). "Роман Михайлович". Славянская энциклопедия. Киевская Русь — Московия. Т. 2: Н—Я (in Russian). Moskva: ОЛМА Медиа Групп. p. 259. ISBN 978-5-224-02251-9.
- Feldbrugge, Ferdinand J. M. (2 October 2017). A History of Russian Law: From Ancient Times to the Council Code (Ulozhenie) of Tsar Aleksei Mikhailovich of 1649. BRILL. ISBN 978-90-04-35214-8.
- Fennell, John L. I. (15 November 2023) [1968]. The Emergence of Moscow, 1304–1359. University of California Press. ISBN 978-0-520-34759-5.
