= Thomas Riha =

Czech-American historian (disappeared 1969)

- Born: Tomáš Ondřej Karel Říha; April 17, 1929; Prague, Czechoslovakia
- Disappeared: March 15, 1969 (aged 39); Boulder, Colorado, U.S.
- Education: University of California, Berkeley; Harvard University
- Scientific career
- Fields: Russian history
- Workplaces: University of Chicago (1960–1967); University of Colorado Boulder (1967–1969)
- Doctoral advisor: Richard Pipes

Thomas Riha (Czech: Tomáš Ondřej Karel Říha; April 17, 1929 – disappeared March 15, 1969) was a Czech-American historian at the University of Chicago and the University of Colorado Boulder.

On March 15, 1969 he disappeared, fuelling speculation that he was involved in espionage.

== Early life ==
Tomáš Ondřej Karel Říha was born in Prague on April 17, 1929. His father Viktor was a well-connected lawyer, and his mother Ruth (née Kress) was a language teacher whose parents were Jewish but had converted to Catholicism.

In 1940, following the Nazi occupation of Czechoslovakia, Riha's mother fled the country. Concerned for the safety of his son, who would have been considered a Mischling under the Nuremberg Laws, his father sent him to boarding school in Zlín, and then to live with relatives in Počaply and Jihlava.

== Education ==
After the War, Riha was sent to London to learn English, before sailing to the United States and enrolling at Berkeley in 1947. In 1951 he graduated with a degree in political science, and the following year became a naturalized U.S. citizen, anglicizing his name to Thomas Riha.

From 1953 to 1954, and again from 1955 to 1956, Riha studied at Columbia University's Russian Institute, serving a stint in the U.S. Army's psychological warfare unit in between. After 1956 he returned to Berkeley, where he obtained a Master's degree, before receiving a PhD in history from Harvard in 1962, where his supervisor was Richard Pipes.

In 1958, Riha went via an exchange program to Moscow State University (during his career he made several other visits to the Soviet Union). Against the instructions of the program's administrators, he travelled to Czechoslovakia on his way to the Soviet Union. According to Riha's nephew Zdenek Cerveny, with whom he stayed in Prague, during his visit an agent of the StB attempted to convince him to defect. When he returned in 1959, the FBI approached him and vetted him as a possible double agent.

== Career ==
Before the completion of his PhD he was hired as an instructor at the University of Chicago, where he developed the university's course on Russian civilization. In 1967 he moved to CU Boulder, where he had been offered a job as an associate professor of history. He was also a visiting professor at the University of Marburg in West Germany, and the University of Hawaii.

For his course at the University of Chicago, Riha edited a three volume collection entitled Readings in Russian Civilization (1964, 2nd Ed. 1969). He also published a political biography of Pavel Milyukov.

== Disappearance ==
=== Preceding events ===
In 1968, Riha married a young Czech woman named Hana Hruskova. However, after four months he filed for divorce. Amidst the divorce proceedings, on March 8, 1969 a woman who identified herself as "Colonel" Galya Tannenbaum, with whom Riha had some sort of relationship, showed up at his house and offered to drive a friend of Hana's home. After dropping the friend off, Tannenbaum attempted to intimidate Hana into signing some documents and then tried to force her to take a pill, before driving her home. Hana locked herself in her room and refused to open the door for either Riha or Tannenbaum. Shortly afterwards she shouted for help from the window and was heard by a neighbor, who took her to his house and refused to hand her over to Riha. Hana claimed that she had smelled ether coming from under the door and that Tannenbaum had threatened to shoot her. Riha showed the police her room, with apparent signs that she had been inhaling the ether herself, but which may have been planted.

The night of March 14, Riha went to a birthday party, where he told the host he thought he was being followed, but refused an offer to stay the night. After he left that night, his family and colleagues never saw or heard from him again.

=== "Colonel" Galya Tannenbaum ===
Eileen Welsome argues that Riha was murdered by Galya Tannenbaum. After Riha's disappearance, Tannenbaum took over his estate and began issuing cheques to herself and selling off his assets. The "Colonel" had in fact been born Gloria Ann Forest in Chicago, and had adopted the name Galya Tanenbaum during a relationship with a man named Leo Tanenbaum, claiming to have been born in Moscow. She had been charged with forging a signature on two occasions, as well as with embezzlement and mail theft, and had served time in prison. The FBI had also investigated her more than once for impersonating an agent, as Tannenbaum claimed to be a colonel in military intelligence with contacts in the INS. She also claimed that she had been in a relationship with Riha for several months in 1967.

Tannenbaum was connected to two deaths caused by cyanide poisoning, and was arrested on charges of forging the will of one of the victims in October 1969. After her arrest, police searched her house and found cyanide. On July 15, 1970 she was declared insane and confined to Colorado State Mental Hospital in Pueblo. The night of March 5, 1971, she took a fatal dose of cyanide and was pronounced dead on March 7.

=== Aftermath ===
Following Riha's disappearance, there was speculation whether he might have been involved in espionage due to his background, knowledge of Russian, and travels to Czechoslovakia and the USSR. The CIA initially instructed CU Boulder's President Joseph R. Smiley that Riha was "alive and well," but later told him to announce that this statement had been made in error. Galya Tannenbaum claimed that Riha was alive and living in Canada, and federal agencies told the Denver Police the same. As a result of this information, the Boulder Police tore up the initial missing person report filed on April 4, and the Denver Police started looking into it only in September. A CIA informant apparently reported meeting Riha in Bratislava in 1973, suggesting he had defected to Czechoslovakia, but whether this informant actually knew Riha could not be verified.

When J. Edgar Hoover learned that the CIA's source for the "alive and well" claim had been an FBI agent, he demanded to know the agent's name. The CIA refused, and as a result Hoover ordered all direct liaison between the FBI and CIA to be terminated, and future liaison to be conducted by letter only. James Jesus Angleton later testified before the Church Committee that the rupture, which was later extended to all intelligence agencies in the United States, was over "this one case."

Riha's nephew Zdenek Cerveny petitioned the Denver Probate Court to declare him dead in 1978.

== Bibliography ==
=== Books ===
- Readings in Russian Civilization, 3 Vols. University of Chicago Press. 1st Ed. 1964, 2nd Rev. Ed. 1969.
  - Vol. I, Russia before Peter the Great, 900-1799.
  - Vol. II, Imperial Russia, 1700-1917.
  - Vol. III, Soviet Russia, 1917-1963.
- A Russian European: Paul Miliukov in Russian Politics. University of Notre Dame Press. 1969.

=== Book Chapters ===
- "Constitutional Developments in Russia," in Theofanis George Stavrou, ed., Russia Under the Last Tsar, 69-86. University of Minnesota Press. 1969.

=== Articles ===
- "Miliukov and the Progressive Bloc in 1915: A Study in Last-Chance Politics," The Journal of Modern History Vol. 32, No. 1 (Mar., 1960), 16-24.
- "Riech': A Portrait of a Russian Newspaper," Slavic Review Vol. 22, No. 4 (Dec., 1963), 663-682.
- "Soviet Historians Today," The Russian Review Vol. 23, No. 3 (Jul., 1964), 259-264.
- "1917. A Year of Illusions," Soviet Studies Vol. 19, No. 1 (Jul., 1967), 115-121.
