= Majar (Golden Horde) =

Human settlement in Russia

Coordinates: 44°50′00″N 44°27′00″E

Majar or Macar /məˈdʒɑːr/ was a medieval city of Golden Horde in 13th-14th centuries. It once played a major role in the trade between Idel-Ural, Caucasus and the Black Sea region. In 1310–1311 the city minted its own money. In 1395 it was sacked by troops of Timur.

The ruins of buildings and also public baths, water pipes and workshops, and other remains of the city are situated on the river Kuma near Budyonnovsk, Stavropol Krai, Russia.

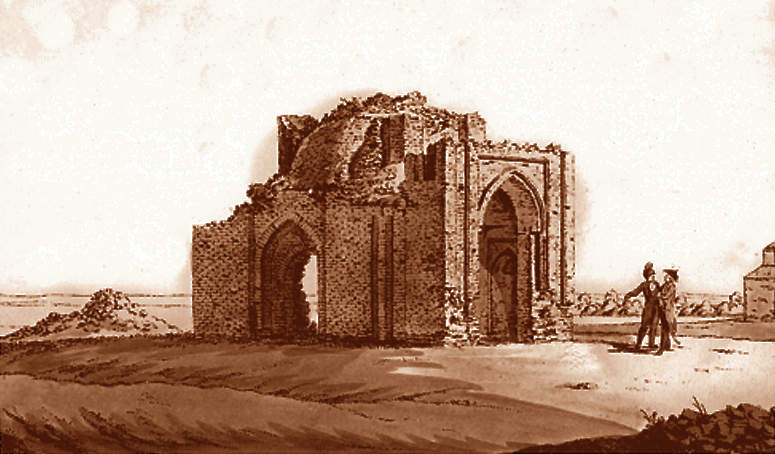
Mohammedan chapel in Great Madjars. Drawing by G. Geisler (Pallas 1799)

Its name comes from the Magyar autonym of the Hungarians.

The town was visited by Ibn Battuta in around 1332: "I then set out for the city of al-Māchar, a large town, one of the finest of the cities of the Turks, on a great river, and possessed of gardens and fruits in abundance."

An unknown Khazar city may have been located there, dating back to the 2nd century CE, and some historians think that this was the capital of the lost Eastern Hungarian Medieval Kingdom which is mentioned north to the Alans in a papal bull in 1329, and in some Byzantine text that talks about the Hungarian migration.
