= Gleb of Beloozero =

Prince of Beloozero from 1238 to 1278

Gleb Vasilkovich
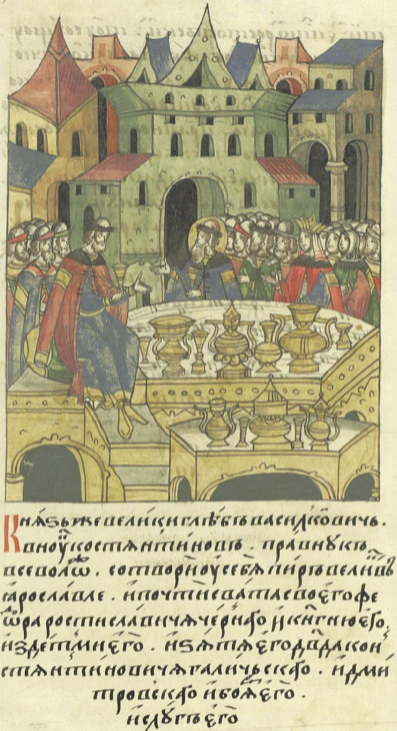
- Gleb along with Fyodor Rostislavich and his wife, miniature from the Illustrated Chronicle of Ivan the Terrible (16th century)

Prince of Beloozero
- Reign: 1238–1278
- Predecessor: Monarchy established
- Successor: Mikhail

Prince of Rostov
- Reign: 1277–1278
- Predecessor: Boris
- Successor: Dmitry
- Died: 1278
- Issue more...: Mikhail of Beloozero
- House: Rurik
- Father: Vasilko of Rostov
- Mother: Maria of Chernigov

Gleb Vasilkovich (Russian: Глеб Василькович; 1237–1278) was Prince of Beloozero from 1238 and Prince of Rostov from 1277 until his death in 1278. He was the younger of the two sons of Vasilko Konstantinovich.

== Reign ==
Gleb was born in 1237. He was the younger of the two sons of Vasilko Konstantinovich and his wife Maria of Chernigov. His father was killed at the battle of Sit River in 1238.

In 1249, Gleb visited Sartak Khan and following his return, he helped transport the body of Vladimir Konstantinovich from Vladimir to his appanage center of Uglich. He visited his patrimony of Beloozero in 1251. In 1258, together with his elder brother Boris, he hosted Alexander Nevsky in Rostov.

In 1277, at the request of the khan Mengu-Timur, Gleb took part in the Mongol campaign against the Alans and participated in the conquest of the city of Dedyakov. His elder brother Boris died during the campaign and Gleb took over the throne of Rostov; however, he died a year later, and Boris's two eldest sons, Dmitry and Konstantin, became the joint rulers of Rostov.

== Family ==
In 1257, Gleb married a daughter of Sartak Khan, who after baptism took the name Feodora. They had three sons: Demyan, Mikhail, and Roman.

== Sources ==
- "Глеб Василькович" . Brockhaus and Efron Encyclopedic Dictionary (in Russian). 1906.
- Boguslavsky, Vladimir V.; Kuksina, Elena I. (2001). "Глеб Василькович". Славянская энциклопедия. Киевская Русь — Московия. Т. 1: А–М (in Russian). Moskva: ОЛМА Медиа Групп. pp. 279–280. ISBN 9785224022502.
- Feldbrugge, Ferdinand J. M. (2 October 2017). A History of Russian Law: From Ancient Times to the Council Code (Ulozhenie) of Tsar Aleksei Mikhailovich of 1649. BRILL. ISBN 978-90-04-35214-8.
- Fennell, John (13 October 2014) [1983]. The Crisis of Medieval Russia 1200-1304. Routledge. ISBN 978-1-317-87314-3.
