= Mongol invasion of Alania =

- Part of the Mongol invasions and conquests
| Date | 1220–1278 |
| Location | North Caucasus, Kingdom of Alania |
| Result | Mongol victory |
| Territorial changes | Fall of the Kingdom of Alania; Capture and destruction of Maghas; Partial subjugation of Alania (mountainous Alans remained independent) |

Belligerents
| Mongol Empire | Kingdom of Alania Supported by: Cumans (initially allied); ~Various North Caucasian tribes |

Commanders and leaders
| Jebe; Subutai; Batu Khan | Unknown |

Casualties and losses
| unknown | 270,000 killed (in Siege of Maghas) |

The Mongol invasion of Alania was a series of military campaigns conducted by the Mongol Empire in the early 13th century (1220–1223), followed by the devastating invasion of 1237–1240, including the siege of the Alanian capital Maghas in 1239–1240, and subsequent campaigns in the 1240s. These invasions were part of the broader Mongol invasions and conquests and marked the first major encounter of European peoples with the Mongol armies.

== Background ==
The Alans descended from the Sarmatians, who settled along the shores of the Sea of Azov and Caspian Sea in the 2nd millennium BCE. Sarmatians and Scythians were considered by ancient Greeks as ethnically related, speaking similar languages. In the North Caucasus, Sarmatian tribes became known as Alans. Following the arrival of the Huns in the 2nd century CE, many Alans migrated westward, while some remained in the Caucasus valleys under the protection of mountain terrain, forming the Alanian kingdom or Alania. Alania was one of the strongest political entities in the region and partially Christianized by the 10th century.

Medieval Arab and Persian sources describe Alania as a densely populated region with strong fortifications and an organized army. The Alanian capital, Maghas, and other mountain fortresses such as Bab-al-Lan were heavily defended by aristocratic cavalry and feudal levies. Alania maintained alliances with the Byzantine Empire and later with the Kingdom of Georgia, reinforced through dynastic marriages, including that of David Soslan, a prince of Alania, to Queen Tamar of Georgia.

The Alanian army relied on a combination of heavily armored cavalry drawn from noble families and infantry drawn from allied tribes and local militias. Estimates suggest a total fighting force of up to 30,000, including a core of 3,000 elite shock cavalry. Alanian heavy cavalry was highly regarded by contemporary observers, including Chinese, Mongol, Iberian, and Rus’ chronicles.

By the late 12th and early 13th centuries, Alania experienced political fragmentation. The central authority of the Alanian kings had weakened due to feudal infighting, while nomadic Kipchaks expanded into the Alanian plains. Feudal decentralization and internal disputes eroded economic cohesion, leaving Alania vulnerable to external invasions. Christianity, introduced in the 10th century, coexisted with pagan traditions, but weakening central power allowed the revival of tribal and ancestral cults. The Alans maintained alliances with neighboring states, particularly the Kingdom of Georgia, where dynastic marriages reinforced political and military ties.

== Mongol invasion (1220–1223) ==
In 1220, following the conquest of Khwarezm, Genghis Khan dispatched a 30,000-strong expeditionary corps under Jebe and Subutai to conduct reconnaissance and military operations in the South Caucasus and North Caucasus regions. The Mongols advanced through Shirvan and surrounding territories, encountering numerous peoples, including Lezgins and Alans.

=== First Alanian encounter (1222) ===
According to Ibn al-Athir, the Alans formed an alliance with local Kipchak groups to resist the Mongols. The first battle was indecisive. The Mongols then employed diplomatic manipulation, offering the Kipchaks gifts and appealing to ethnic and religious distinctions. The Kipchaks accepted the bribes and withdrew, leaving the Alans isolated. The Mongols then decisively defeated the Alans, looting, killing, and taking captives. The main Kipchak leaders, Yuri Konchakovich and Danilo Kobyakovich, were later killed while attempting to flee.

=== Mongol raids in Crimea (1222–1223) ===
The Mongols extended their campaign into the Crimean Peninsula, targeting the city of Sudak (Sugdya), a major trading center of the Kipchaks. Contemporary Greek sources, including a Sinaxary note dated 27 January 1223, confirm the Mongols’ presence near Sudak, though the city itself may not have been fully captured. These raids demonstrated Mongol mobility and strategic reconnaissance over a vast area.

== Alanian society and resistance ==
Alania was a densely settled kingdom, with hundreds of villages in mountain valleys and plains. The king’s aristocratic families provided the core of heavily armored cavalry, while vassals and allied tribes supplied infantry. Infantry formations, such as the Vainakh mazhak wedge formation, supplemented the Alanian cavalry. Alanian warriors were highly disciplined, skilled with lances, and renowned for their courage, earning respect from contemporary observers, including the Mongols, and influencing Mongol cavalry tactics.

Despite defeats in open battles, the Alans retreated into the highlands, where the mountainous terrain provided a defensive advantage. Alanian feudal lords continued to exercise control over parts of the North Caucasus independently. The Alanian nobility, including the aldar family of Bibilta, retained some autonomy by aligning with the Georgian crown, serving as eristavs (regional governors) under Georgian authority.

Christianity persisted in parts of Alania, particularly in eastern regions under Georgian influence, while pagan traditions revived in more isolated areas. Historical sources, including Bishop Theodore of Alania’s Alanian Letter (1223–1226) and the observations of Dominican monk Julian, describe a population that was a mixture of Christians and pagans, with respect for Christian symbols, such as the cross, persisting even amid feudal conflicts.

== Mongol invasion (1237–1240) and Siege of Maghas ==
In 1235, at the Kurlutai, a decision was made on a Mongol campaign with the aim of conquering Bulgaria, Rus' and As (Alania) led by Batu. The second major Mongol invasion of Alania began in 1236–1237 as part of the Golden Horde’s westward expansion. Mongol forces initially attacked northern Alania, capturing the plains and subjugating Kipchak allies, before advancing into the North Caucasus in 1239–1240.

The Alanian capital Maghas and other fortresses, including Bab-al-Lan, were heavily fortified. Maghas withstood a prolonged siege of approximately 3 months before finally falling. Many Alanian nobles and defenders were killed, and the city was systematically destroyed. Following the fall of Maghas, the remaining Alans in the mountains retreated into inaccessible valleys, where they continued guerrilla resistance against Mongol control.

The capture of Maghas marked the effective collapse of centralized Alanian authority. Remaining Alanian polities fragmented further, and many inhabitants fled to remote mountainous areas, Georgian-controlled regions, or even farther west. Mongol control gradually extended over the North Caucasus, incorporating Alania into the Jochi Ulus of the Golden Horde, though some highland regions maintained de facto independence.

== Subsequent Mongol campaigns (1240s) ==
After Maghas, Mongol expeditions continued in the 1240s to consolidate control and incorporate Alans into the Mongol military system. Alanian heavy cavalry became part of Mongol forces in campaigns across Eurasia, including service under Batu Khan in Europe and later under Hulagu Khan in the Middle East. Isolated highland Alans continued resisting Mongol authority for decades, requiring permanent military garrisons. Guillaume de Rubruck names the Zikhs, Alans and Lezgi among the peoples unconquered by the Mongols in 1253.

The last large-scale uprising of the Alans against occupation was the Dedyakov Uprising. The revolt was most likely caused by the increasing tax burden in the Golden Horde. Russian chronicles report a major uprising in the North Caucasus in 1278 and the siege of the Alan city of Dedyakov by the Mongols, who were joined by the retinues of Rus' princes. The rebellion was so extensive that forces from across the Golden Horde were gathered, led personally by Khan Mengu-Timur. In February 1278, Dedyakov was burned down.

== Cultural and societal impact ==
The Mongol invasions devastated Alania politically and demographically, but did not erase its cultural identity. Christianity persisted in some regions, particularly in areas under Georgian influence, while ancestral pagan and tribal cults revived in more remote mountainous areas. Famine, depopulation of the plains, and migration to the highlands were common consequences of the invasions.

Despite these hardships, the Alans continued to engage in trade, notably with Genoese merchants in the Karachay region. Alanian folklore preserved the memory of these conflicts: the Nart sagas recount battles against invaders, reflecting societal trauma, heroism, and the significance of economic resources such as salt. Additionally, Alans influenced European cavalry traditions, with their elite units serving as palace guards and shock cavalry in Mongol campaigns. According to some sources, the number of Alan soldiers in Mongolia amounted to several tens of thousands. Alans also lived in capital of Mongol Empire, Karakorum. The Asud clan is the descendants of the Alans in Mongolia. However, over the course of 700 years of living in Mongolia, they lost the Alanic language.

== See also ==
- Mongol invasions of Georgia
- Mongol invasion of Circassia
- Mongol invasions of Durdzuketi
- Battle of Khankala
- Golden Horde
