= Belosselsky-Belozersky family =

Russian princely family

Princely arms of the family

The House of Belosselsky-Belozersky is a Rurikid Russian princely family that descends in a direct male line from the Earliest Kievan Rus rulers and later of the medieval sovereigns of the Principality of Beloozero.

== Origins ==
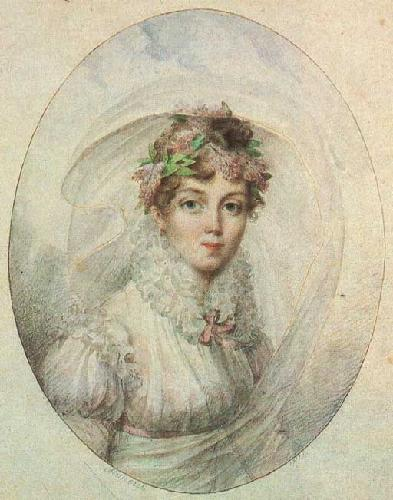
Princess Zenaǐde Wolkonsky, née Zenaida Alexandrovna Belosselskaya Belozerskaya

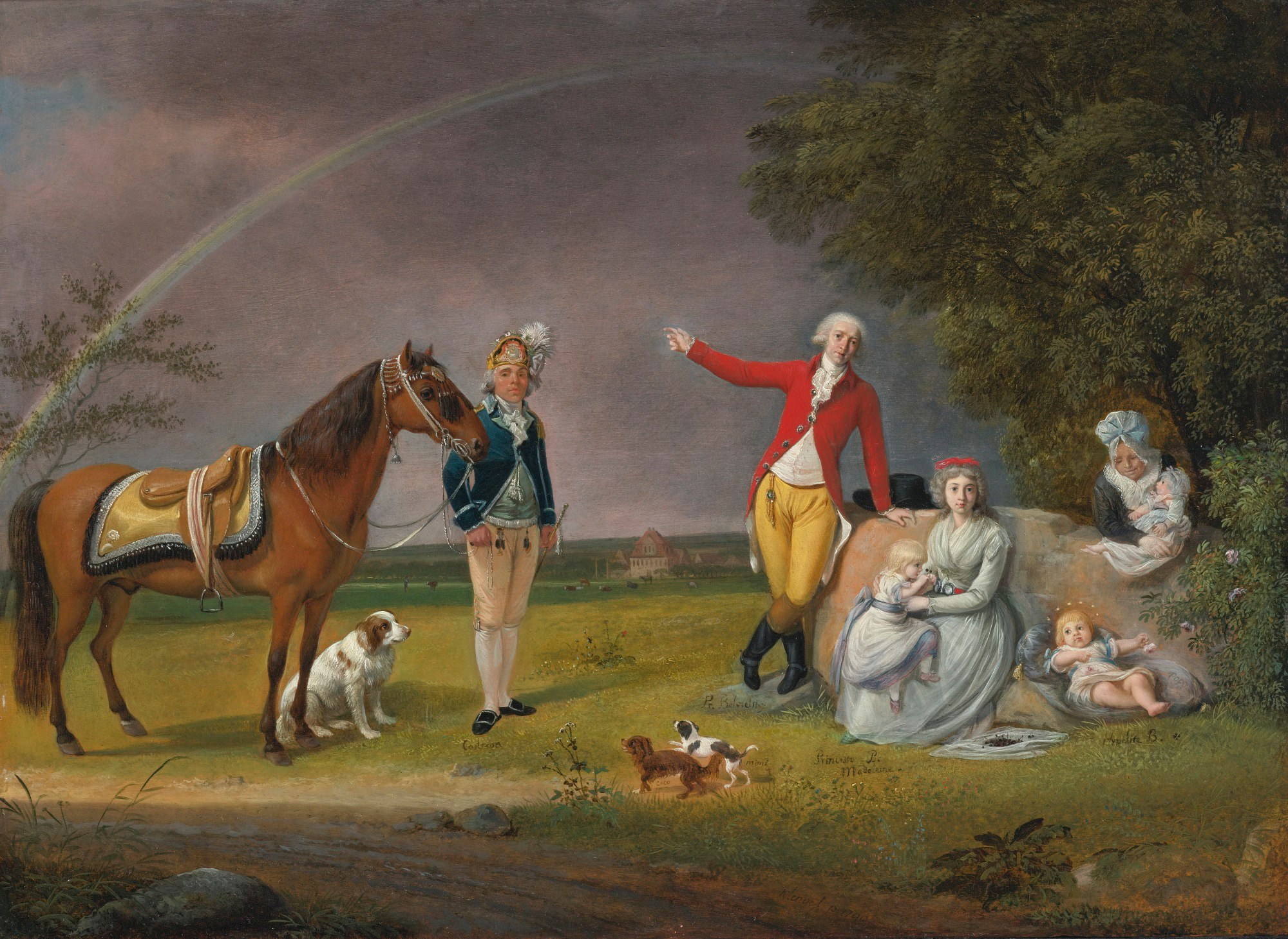
Prince A. M. Belosselsky-Belozersky and his family on a painting by Johann Christian Klengel sold at Sotheby's in New York for US$75.000

The family of Belosselsky-Belozersky claims the descendance directly from the first Russian Princes, from the "Kiev Rus" period and specifically from Prince Rurik (of Swedish roots), who created their seat in Kiev around the years 870–890.

The family traces its patronymic, father-to-son roots throughout the ruling houses of Russia until the mid 16th century, to Yuri Dolgoruky (founder of Moscow) and his grandsons who were grand-dukes/princes of Kiev as well as of Rostov, Vladimir-Suzdal principality. After the ascendance of Ivan Kalita ("Moneybags") and the Romanov dynasty, the family were rulers of the Belozersk (White Lake) principality, north of Moscow. Gleb Vasilkovich was the first Belozersky prince to rule there.

On one of the required annual visits to Sarai, the headquarters of the Golden Horde, near today's Astrakhan, to renew his patent (yarlik) received from the reigning Khan and ruler of the Golden Horde Sartak Khan, allowing thus Gleb to rule and tax his lands for another year. On such visit, Gleb married Feodora, Sartak's daughter Feodora Sartakovna, also granddaughter of the Mongol ruler Batu Khan and great-great-granddaughter of Genghis Khan. Gleb Vasilkovich thus consolidated the power of the dominant Tatar-Mongol rulers and the Belozersky clan.

The offspring of Gleb and Feodora Sartakovna, the current Belosselsky-Belozersky family, are thus descendants of Genghis Khan as well as of the founder of Russia, Prince Rurik. Subsequently, the family, after having lost the majority of its men in the historical "watershed" battle for Russia's independence, the battle of Kulikovo in 1380, against the Tatar-Mongol dominance, the few remaining Belozersky princes slowly lost the control of the lands in the Belo Ozero/Belozersk principality area (White Lake). The family was relegated thereafter to a more minor ruling role over the lands of "Belo Selo" south of Belozersk ("Belosselsky" - of White Village) when the Moscow principality led by Moscow Romanovs were slowly taking control over all the former semi-independent principalities of Russia.

After a period of lesser prominence, but still providing military and political leaders, it became a major factor in support to Peter the Great's reforms, in building the Russian navy and providing diplomats and military leaders. In early 1800 Alexander Mikhailovich Belosselsky-Belozersky, due to his significant contributions to Russia in diplomacy, science and culture, was granted the right to bear the double princely name of Belosselsky-Belozersky from Emperor Paul I, in recognition of the Belosselsky branch being the single remaining such branch of the princes having ruled Belo Ozero and being of the Belozersky dynasty.

== On Krestovsky Island ==
The Belosselsky-Belozersky princes owned the island of Krestovsky after it was purchased by Prince Alexander Mikhailovich Belosselsky-Belozersky around 1800, then used mainly as a summer residence. Around 1885, they moved there from their Nevsky Prospect No. 41 "Beloselsky-Belozersky Palace", by the Fontanka canal and Anichkov Bridge, having sold their palace to Grand Duke Sergei Alexandrovich. Two of the last Belosselsky-Belozersky Princes to reside on Krestovsky Island were the sons of Konstantin Esperovich, Sergei Konstantinovich and Esper Konstantinovich Belosselsky-Belozersky. The "Krestovsky" was their estate in St. Petersburg until the Russian Revolution in 1917 forced them to leave Russia and all their possessions behind, including the Krestovsky Island and their estate on it.

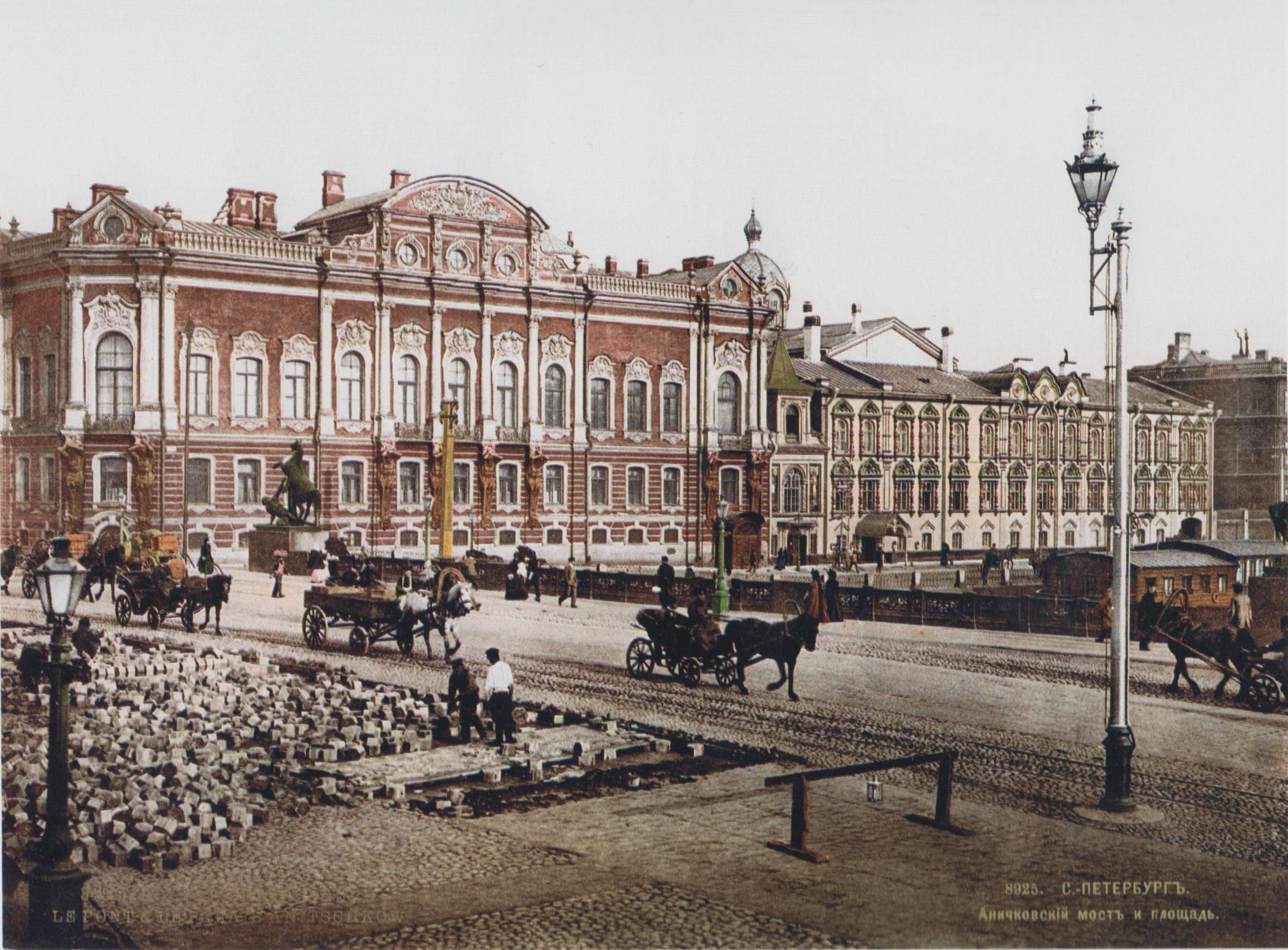
Beloselsky-Belozersky Palace on Nevsky Avenue in St. Petersburg

The two young Belosselsky-Belozersky Princes were successful sportsmen and promoters of equestrian and sailing sports. Sergei Konstantinovich was the second representative of Russia on the International Olympic Committee and worked closely with Baron de Coubertin, who launched the modern Olympic movement. Sergei was invited to be a member of the Organizing committee of the Paris Olympics of 1900 and took part in the equestrian competitions. His younger brother, Esper Konstantinovich was an avid sailor who won a bronze medal for Russia in the 1912 Stockholm Olympics in the 10 meter class.

== After the Russian Revolution (1917) ==
The Belosselsky-Belozersky family was forced to flee to the West during the 1917 revolution, leaving no one in Russia.

Prince Konstantin (1847–1920) and his wife Nadezhda Dimitrievna (died 1920; née Skobeleva; sister of General Mikhail Skobelev) had three daughters and two sons. The Russian Revolution split the family and their lives apart.

Prince Konstantin Esperovich and Princess Nadezhda Dimitrievna fled to Vyborg (Viipuri) in Finland during the late spring/summer of 1917. They had acquired a private multi-storey building by the Vyborg railway station where the family and their close relatives fled to from the unrest of Petrograd. Eventually, as it became obvious that the events in Petrograd were not "temporary" and as the Finnish Civil War had commenced as well, between the Reds and the Whites, they gave up hope in returning to Petrograd and moved to London and then to Paris. They never returned to Russia.

Their daughter Princess Olga Orlova, her son Prince Nicholas Vladimirovich with his wife Princess Nadejda Petrovna of Russia, a Romanov Princess and daughter Princess Irina Nicholayevna, fled via Crimea (from Yalta) to France in the company of Dowager Empress Maria Feodorovna on the British warship HMS Marlborough. Olga Konstantinovna had married Prince, Lieutenant General, General Adjutant of His Majesty and Chief of Chancellery, Prince Vladimir N. Orlov; Valentin Serov painted her, main pieces currently in the Russian Museum in St. Petersburg.

The second daughter, sister of Princess Olga Konstantinovna, Princess Elena Konstantinovna left for France and Paris, with her husband Prince Victor Sergeievich Kotchoubey, their estate "Dikanka" famous Kotchoubey Princes estate in Ukraine, steeped in the Ukrainian/Russian history, near Poltava; eulogized by Pushkin and Gogol in their poems and writings. The youngest daughter, sister of Olga and Elena Konstantinovna, Princess Maria Konstantinovna ended up living in Brussels, married to Major General Boris E. Hartmann, commander of the Russian Imperial Chevalier Guards/Horse Guards Regiment.

Of the two sons of Konstantin Esperovich and Nadezhda Dimitrievna, the older son Prince Sergei Konstantinovich (1867–1951), after a military career, including as a commanding officer of the Novorossiisk Dragoons, regiment of the Lancers of her Imperial Majesty, etc. fled with his family also to Vyborg at first (late 1917) and participated after this in the "White Movement" among other, as an advisor to General Yudenich, the commander of the Northwestern White Army and head of the Russian counter-revolutionary Northwestern "government", created with the help of Britain based at that time in Finland.

In this capacity, he spent considerable time in 1918 in Finland as an envoy and liaison to General, later Marshal, Gustaf Mannerheim, a fellow-General and friend from the Russian Imperial Army who was the head of the White Army of Finland. In the fall of 1913 Belosselsky-Belozersky and Mannerheim, as Russian imperial military officers, had been chosen by the Chief of Staff and Commander in Chief, Grand Duke Nikolai Nikolaievich as the two to attend the top French military cavalry riding school of the école d'application de cavalerie in Saumur, on the Loire river. Mannerheim was often also a guest of the Belosselsky-Belozersky family both on Krestovsky Ostrov, taking part there in polo matches on the Belosselsky-Belozersky polo grounds on their estate - including at the inauguration of the Belosselsky-Beloselsky polo grounds during summer of 1897 - as well as a frequent visitor to their homes in the city. A photo of this event, showing the winning team on horseback, including Gustaf Mannerheim the Krestovsky, Belosselsky-Belozersky polo grounds, is on display in the Mannerheim museum, in Helsinki Finland.

Sergei Konstantinovich's attempts to persuade Mannerheim and the White Army of Finland to join the Yudenich army's attempt to take back Petrograd/Saint Petersburg, failed, because of the key issue for Finns, centering on the recognition of Finland's independence; the Whites did not want change in "status quo" while the "Red" government recognized Finnish independence. Later he performed for the White Russian monarchists as well as Finns duties and services as a special envoy for London. When the Northwest armies led by Rodzianko and Yudenich failed in their attempt to capture Petrograd he moved permanently to England late 1919, finally to Tonbridge in Kent where he died 20 April 1951 and where he and his wife Susan Carlovna, née Whittier are buried in the Tonbridge cemetery. Their youngest son Andre is buried nearby.

Prince Sergei Konstantinovich's older son Prince Sergei Sergeievich Belosselsky-Belozersky (1898–1978), fought with the Horse Guard in the WW I battles, returned to then Petrograd in 1918 and after having been arrested in Petrograd in mid-1918 by Red Guards and imprisoned in both the Peter and Paul Fortress and Kronstadt island naval base, but released on the orders of Moisei Uritsky (See the Memoirs of Prince Serge Sergeevich Belosselsky-Belozersky published by Jacques Ferrand; edited by Marvin Lyons) fled to Finland at first, where he joined his father, grandfather and others of the Belosselsky-Belozersky family members. In the summer of 1919 he went to Tallinn (former Reval) to join the Northwest white army in the final attempts to defeat the Reds and capture Petrograd. When this failed, they managed to return to Finland in late 1919 and in early January 1920 to move to London and Paris before finally moving to the United States prior to WWII.

Sergei Konstantinovich's younger, at this time eleven-year-old son Andrei Sergeievich had moved with his parents to London and Tonbridge. He died childless in 1961 in Reading. Surviving family of this Sergei Konstantinovich branch are daughters of Sergei Sergeievich and their families; Princess Marina Sergeievna (Kazarda) (1945-) and Princess Tatiana Sergeievna (Besamat) (1947-). No direct male Belosselsky-Belozersky descendants remain in this "Sergeievich" branch of the family. However, in July 2012, the head of the current ruling Romanov family, HIH Maria Vladimirovna, as titular head of Russian nobility, granted by decree the right to the eldest son of the elder daughter of Sergei Sergeievich Belosselsky-Belozersky, Peter Belosselsky-Blozersky Kasarda, the right to assume the name and title of his grandfather, along with all the heraldic and other rights of nobility tied to this. The rights passes to the eldest son of his family branch, for each future generation, in perpetuity.

The younger son of Prince Konstantin Esperovich Belosselsky-Belozersky, Prince Esper Konstantinovich, was an officer of the Baltic Fleet in the elite "Garde-Marine" corps and had served as an officer on the imperial yachts "Alexandria" and the "Polar Star". Both yachts had served the Emperor and his family until the "Standart" was built, after which the more modern of the older two, the Polar Star served exclusively the Dowager Empress, Maria Feodorovna mother of Nikolai II. During the violent first mutinies by the Baltic Fleet's sailors, based in Kronstadt island naval base outside of Petrograd, Esper Konstantinovich barely avoided capture -and likely murder- by the sailors. Together with his two young sons Georges Esperovich, Paul Esperovich, their mother Madeleine Jakovlena, née Moulin with nannies and household servants he fled to Finland at first, during the summer of 1917. Together with the rest of the extended family at that time in Finland, they awaited the developments until it was clear that there was little hope to return to Russia. They made their way to Paris and France in late 1919. Esper Konstantinovich died in early 1921 and is buried in the Batignolles cemetery in the 17th arrondissement of Paris. Meanwhile, Esper Konstantinovich' oldest son Konstantin Esperovich, a freshly promoted ensign of the Horse Guards in October 1917, an 18-year-old officer, was with his Horse Guards detachment in Kiev where he was murdered on January 28, 1918 by a red guardist sailor who shot him in the back of the head in the streets of Kiev in connection with the first revolutionary and nationalistic waves of fighting in Kiev, where Russian imperial officers were targeted by all. He is buried in Kiev in the Pokrovsky Nunnery.
