= Vasilko Konstantinovich =

Prince of Rostov from 1219 to 1238

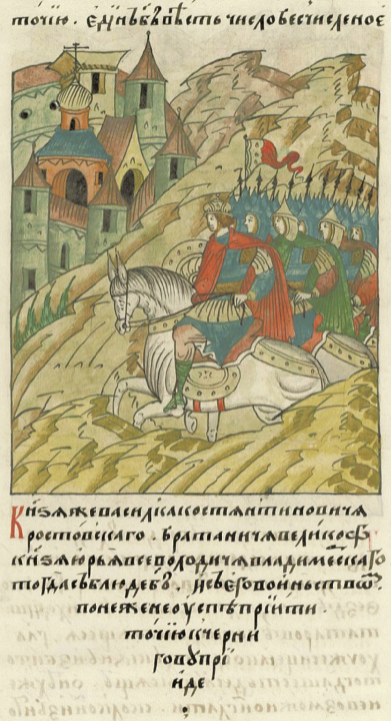
Vasilko goes to the Kalka River in 1223, miniature from the Illustrated Chronicle of Ivan the Terrible (16th century)

Vasilko Konstantinovich (Russian: Василько Константинович; 7 December 1209, in Rostov – 4 March 1238) was Prince of Rostov from 1219 to 1238. He was the son of Konstantin of Rostov, and the spouse of Maria of Chernigov. He died in the battle of the Sit River during the Mongol invasions, and was succeeded by his sons Boris and Gleb.

== Sources ==
- "Василько Константинович" . Brockhaus and Efron Encyclopedic Dictionary (in Russian). 1906.
- Isoaho, Mari (1 June 2006). The Image of Aleksandr Nevskiy in Medieval Russia: Warrior and Saint. BRILL. ISBN 978-90-474-0949-6.
- Presnyakov, Aleksandr E. (1970). Rieber, Alfred J. (ed.). The Formation of the Great Russian State: A Study of Russian History in the Thirteenth to Fifteenth Centuries. Translated by Moorhouse, A.E. Quadrangle Books. ISBN 9781131812656.
