= Roman of Uglich =

Prince of Uglich from 1261 to 1285

Roman Vladimirovich
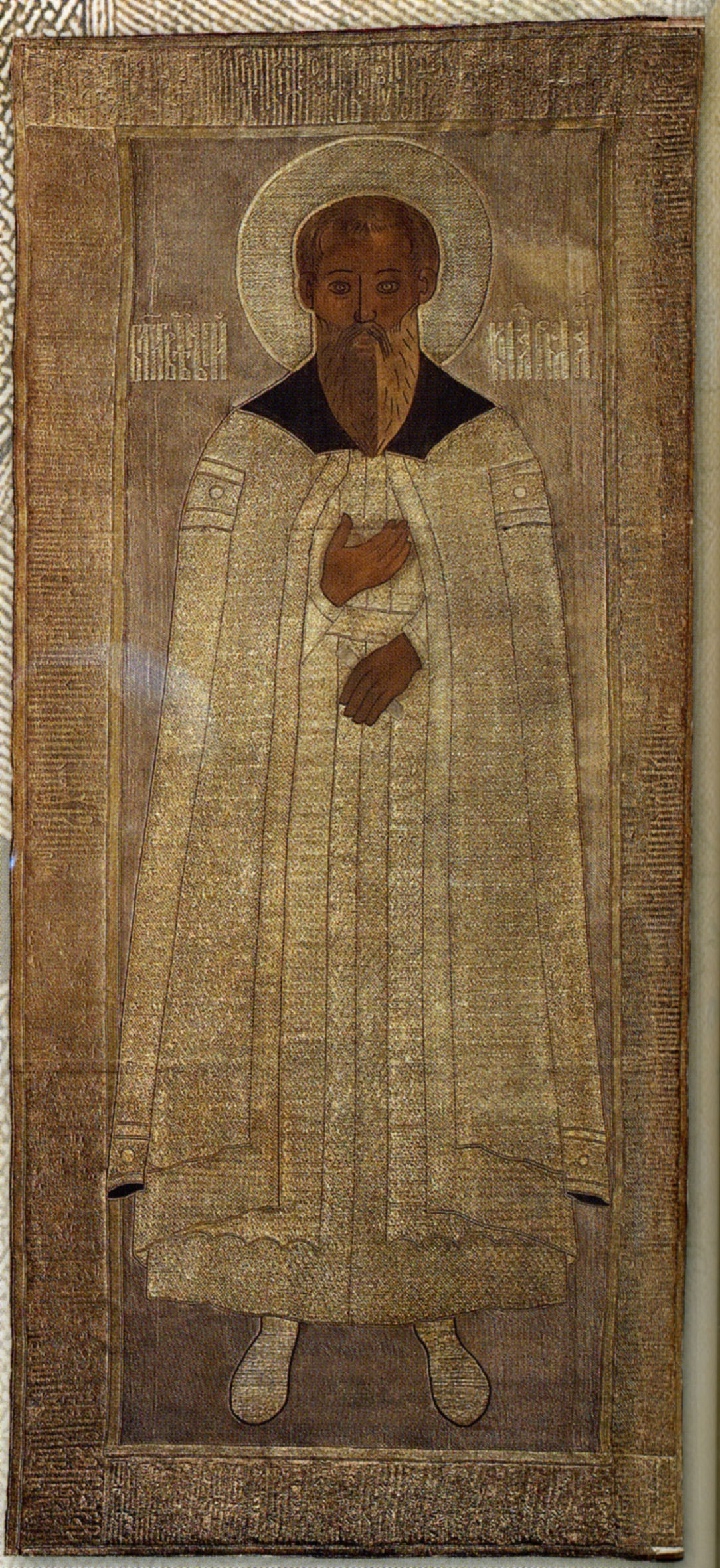
- Workshop of Marfa Polchaninova, 1619

Prince of Uglich
- Reign: 1261–1285
- Predecessor: Andrey
- Successor: Dmitry
- Died: 3 February 1285
- House: Rurik
- Father: Vladimir of Uglich

Roman Vladimirovich (Russian: Роман Владимирович; died 3 February 1285) was Prince of Uglich from 1261 until his death in 1285.

== Reign ==
The basic information about Roman's life was recorded in medieval Russian chronicles, while later and unreliable accounts appear in the 18th–19th-century lists of the Uglich Chronicler, which includes local legends about him.

The year and place of Roman's birth are unknown, but he was probably born sometime between 1239/1240 and 1249, as he was not included in a 1238 list of princes who had survived the Mongol invasions. He was the younger of the two sons of Vladimir Konstantinovich, the first appanage prince of Uglich, from his marriage to Nadezhda Ingvarevna, a princess of Ryazan.

Roman received the Uglich principality in 1261 following the death of his elder brother Andrey. Roman had a reputation for being pious and philanthropic as he built 15 churches during his reign. Roman spent his last years praying, fasting and donating to charity. He died on 3 February 1285 without heirs. This allowed Dmitry of Rostov to take the throne of Uglich.

Roman was buried in the Transfiguration Cathedral in Uglich, and was re-buried in 1595 in a newly built stone church after his relics were discovered to be incorruptible. He is venerated as a local saint.

== Sources ==
- "Роман, русские князья" . Brockhaus and Efron Encyclopedic Dictionary (in Russian). 1906.
- Boguslavsky, Vladimir V.; Kuksina, Elena I. (2001). "Роман Владимирович". Славянская энциклопедия. Киевская Русь — Московия. Т. 2: Н—Я (in Russian). Moskva: ОЛМА Медиа Групп. p. 256. ISBN 978-5-224-02251-9.
- Feldbrugge, Ferdinand J. M. (2 October 2017). A History of Russian Law: From Ancient Times to the Council Code (Ulozhenie) of Tsar Aleksei Mikhailovich of 1649. BRILL. ISBN 978-90-04-35214-8.
- Fennell, John (13 October 2014) [1983]. The Crisis of Medieval Russia 1200-1304. Routledge. ISBN 978-1-317-87314-3.
- Kuzmin, A. V. (2020). "Роман Владимирович". Православная энциклопедия. Т. LX: Рипсимия, Гаиания и 35 святых дев. Moscow: Православная энциклопедия. pp. 117–123. ISBN 978-5-89572-067-7.
