= Principality of Beloozero =

Russian principality (1238–1486)

Coordinates: 60°00′N 37°50′E

Principality of Beloozero Белозерское княжество
- 1238–1486
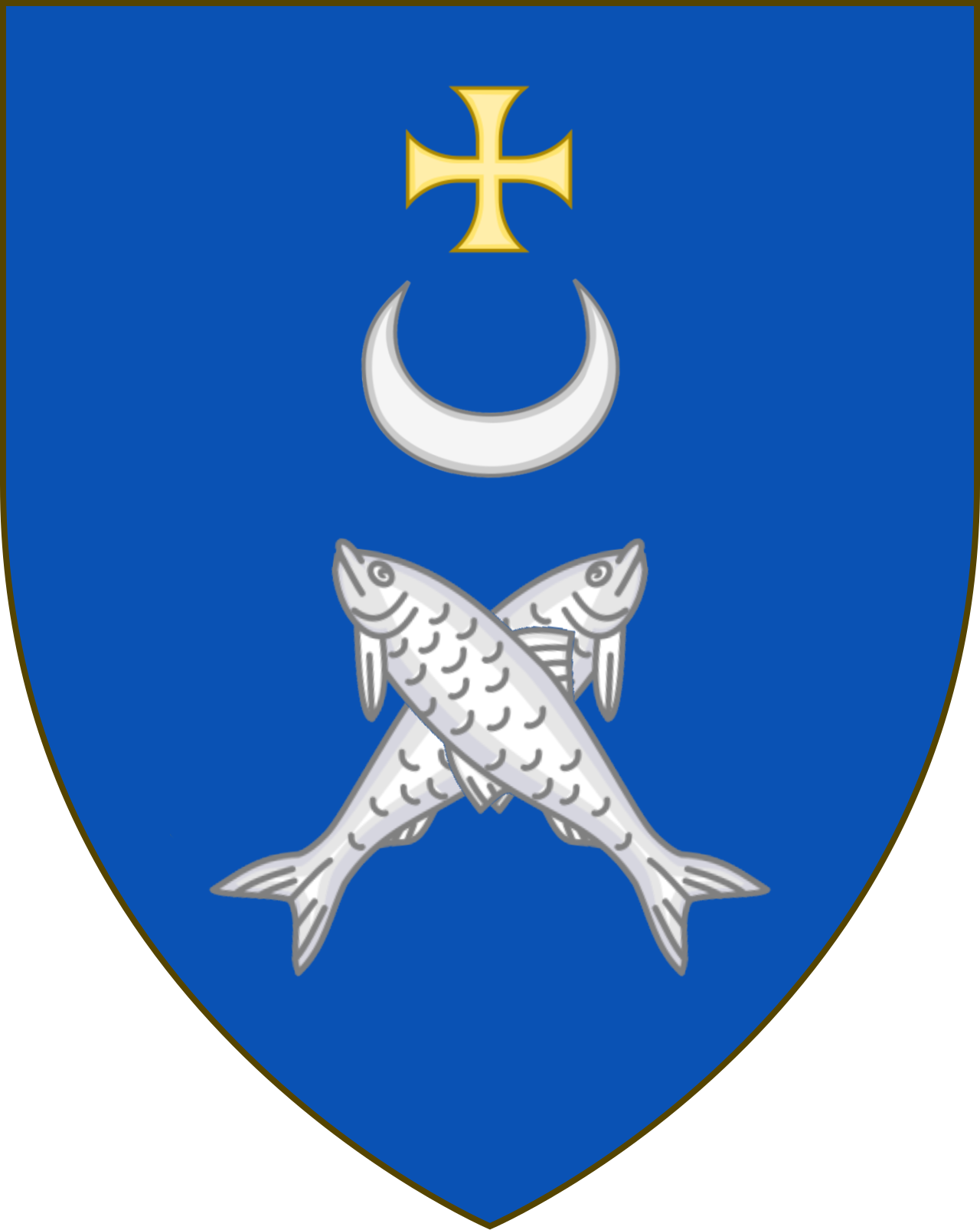
- Coat of arms

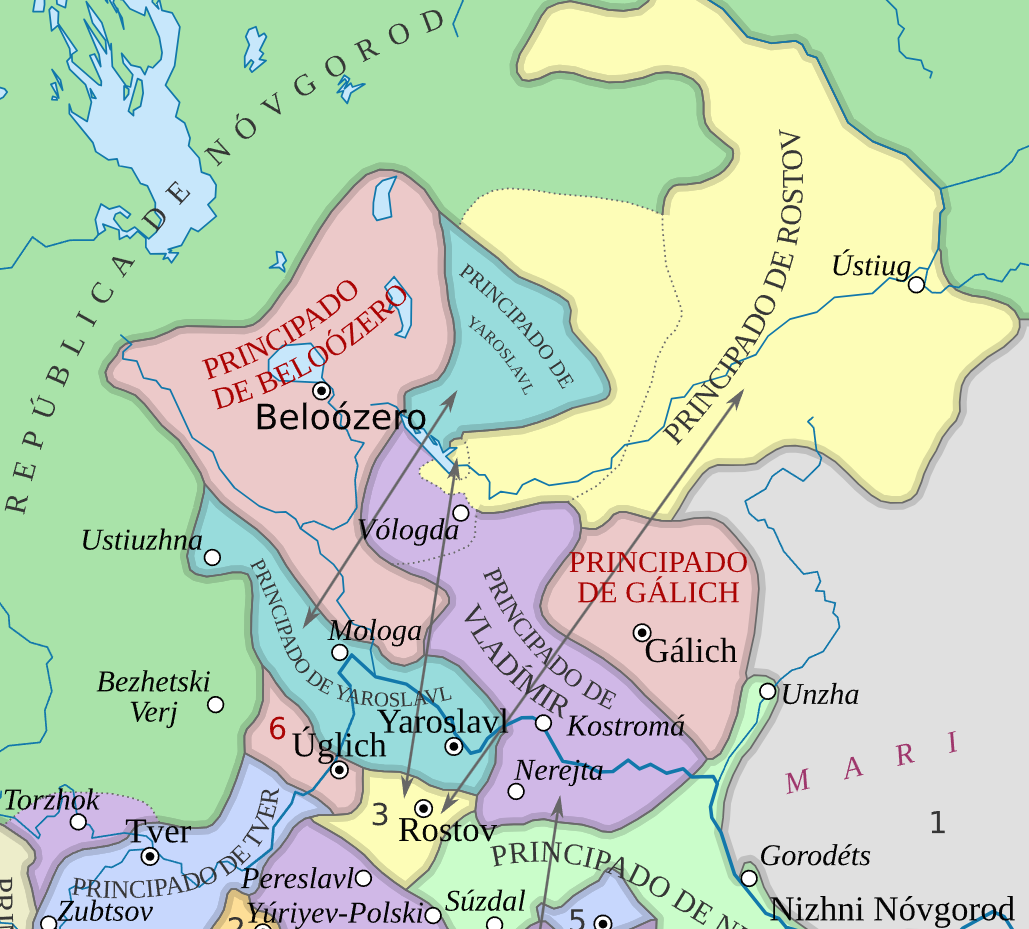
- Principality of Beloozero (14th century)
- Status: Principality
- Capital: Beloozero
- Common languages: Russian
- Religion: Russian Orthodoxy
- Government: Monarchy
- Prince
  - 1238–1278: Gleb Vasilkovich (first)
- Historical era: Middle Ages
  - Established: 1238
  - Annexed to Moscow: 1486
Preceded by	Succeeded by
Principality of Rostov	Grand Principality of Moscow
- Today part of: Russia

The Principality of Beloozero (Russian: Белозерское княжество, romanized: Belozerskoye knyazhestvo) was a Russian principality which flourished between the 13th and 15th centuries in the Russian North.

Its capital was Beloozero (now Belozersk), one of the five original towns mentioned in the Primary Chronicle. In terms of the current administrative division of Russia, the principality was located in the west of Vologda Oblast, around the south of Lake Beloye.

It was closely associated with Rostov until it became independent in 1238 during the Mongol invasions. Dmitry Donskoy secured control over Beloozero and passed it to his descendants; it was formally annexed to Moscow by Ivan III.

== History ==
The Primary Chronicle states that Rurik sent the Ves tribe to Beloozero. But even before this, the town already had their own aboriginal inhabitants. Simon Franklin cautions against taking the chronicle at present value; of legendary tales of brothers founding a new city and a new ruling dynasty, similar to other mythological origin stories that happened across different cultures.

During the Rurik period, Rostov and Beloozero were under the authority of Novgorod but were later detached and governed directly from Kiev, during the late 11th century. Later in the early- to mid-12th century, Rostov-Suzdal (who would later claim authority over Beloozero) emerged in power under the rule of Yuri Dolgorukiy (son of Vladimir Monomakh) and made state policy to dominate the Novgorod trade route along the Volga.

The chronicle mentioned that in 1071, the Kievan tysiatskii, Ian Vyshatich was collecting tribute while in Beloozero, when he saw locals refusing to hand over the volkhvy (pagan priests). The volkhvy had previously killed many women whom they blamed for hoarding supplies and caused a famine in Rostov. Ian later managed to kill the volkhvy.

The duchy had lost its former significance by the early 14th century. In the first half of the 14th century, Ivan Kalita, the Grand Prince of Moscow, was already appointing namestniks of Beloozero who administered the principality instead of the princes.

The principality was detached from the Principality of Rostov in 1238. The town of Beloozero (today's Belozersk) became its capital. Prince Gleb was the first prince of Beloozero (ca. 1238–1278). He increased his standing enormously by marrying Sartaq's daughter. The later rulers of Beloozero could claim a descent from Genghis Khan through this marriage. During Gleb's reign, the duchy's territory embraced the basin of Lake Beloye, the lower streams of the Sheksna River, and Lake Kubenskoye.

In 1389, it was subjugated by Muscovy. Dmitry Donskoy, the Grand Prince of Moscow, handed the principality out to his son Andrey Dmitriyevich. At the end of the 14th century, two influential monasteries were founded on the lands belonging to the principality: Kirillo-Belozersky Monastery in 1397 and Ferapontov Monastery in 1398. The creation was supported by the Moscow princes who considered the foundation of the monasteries as an arm of the influence of Moscow in the north.

In 1486, the principality, which at the time was part of the united Principality of Beloozero and Vereya, was formally incorporated into the Grand Duchy of Moscow. Numerous descendants of the ruling Rurikid princes moved to Moscow and continue in a male line to the present. The Belosselsky-Belozersky family was the most notable among them.

== Economy ==
The chronicle suggests a high importance to Beloozero as it was the residence of Rurik's brother, yet the town did not develop into a major political center, however, it became a frequent port of call. Even though Beloozero was a small rural settlement, Scandinavian items such as combs have been excavated there, suggesting extensive trade networks. Furthermore, 10th-century fragments found in Beloozero suggest imports from the southern regions to the town. Kievan glassware was traded in Beloozero, indicating trade contacts between the towns.

== List of princes ==
Dmitry Donskoy's son Andrei and his son Mikhail were the nominal princes of Beloozero until it was formally annexed in 1485.

== See also ==
- Bibliography of Russian history
