= List of wars involving the Principality of Tver =

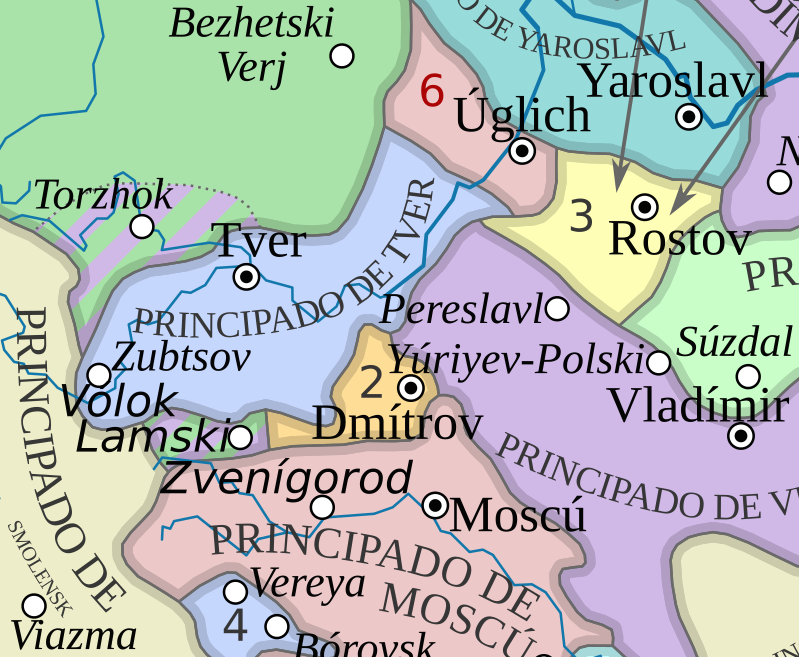
Principality of Tver in the 14th century, during the Great Troubles

This is a list of wars involving the Principality of Tver (1246–1485), centred around the city of Tver. (Note: Also spelt Tver', (Russian: Тверь, romanized: Tver', Church Slavonic: Тферь, romanized: Tfer'). English adjective and demonym: Tverian or Tverite. In primary sources such as the Tver Chronicle and the Word of Praise for the Grand Prince Boris Aleksandrovich, it is also referred to as the "Grand Principality of Tver'" (Church Slavonic: великое княжение Тферское, romanized: velikoye kniazhenie Tferskoye) or the "Tverian Land" (Church Slavonic: Тферская земля, romanized: Tferskaia zemlia), which was supposedly an equal part of the larger "Rus' Land" (Church Slavonic: русская земля, romanized: russkaia zemlia), alongside the "Muscovite Land" (Church Slavonic: московская земля, romanized: moskovskaia zemlia) and other grand principalities in northeastern Rus'.)

Victory of Tver (and allies)
Defeat of Tver (and allies)
Another result*

*e.g. result unknown or indecisive/inconclusive, result of internal conflict inside the Principality of Tver, status quo ante bellum, or a treaty or peace without a clear result.

Date	Conflict	Combatant 1	Combatant 2	Result
1281– c. 1291	Vladimir-Suzdal war of succession (1281–1293): Casus belli: Dmitry of Pereslavl paid no homage to the new khan, Tuda Mengu; Andrey devastated Vladimir, Suzdal, and Pereslavl with Tuda Mengu's support (1281); Dmitry recaptured Pereslavl, Novgorod (1283) and Vladimir (1285) with Nogai's support	Dmitry of Pereslavl-Zalessky: Daumantas of Pskov; Principality of Tver; Principality of Moscow; Nogai Khan	Andrey of Gorodets: Golden Horde khan at Sarai; Novgorod Republic; Principality of Rostov; Principality of Yaroslavl; Principality of Starodub	Mixed results: Andrey made G. P. of Vladimir by khan Tuda Mengu at Sarai; Dmitry made G. P. of Vladimir by Nogai Khan; Stalemate until 1291
1293	Dyuden's campaign: Casus belli: Dmitry of Pereslavl, Mikhail of Tver and Daniel of Moscow paid no homage to Toqta	Dmitry of Pereslavl; Mikhail of Tver; Daniel of Moscow	Golden Horde; Andrey of Gorodets; Theodore of Yaroslavl	Golden Horde victory: Vladimir, Tver and Moscow ravaged; Andrey made G. P. of Vladimir
1296, 1298	Struggle for Pereslavl-Zalessky: Casus belli: Andrey of Gorodets tried to seize Pereslavl-Zalessky by force after it had been assigned to Ivan Dmitrievich	Ivan Dmitrievich of Pereslavl-Zalessky; Daniel of Moscow; Mikhail of Tver	Andrey of Gorodets; Theodore of Yaroslavl; Konstantin of Ryazan	Allied victory against Andrey: Moscow sacked (1298); Ivan repelled Andrey both times with Tverite–Muscovite support
1304–1308	Tverian–Muscovite war: Casus belli: death of Andrey of Gorodets; Key events: 1304: Battle of Pereslavl-Zalessky; Muscovite victory; 1304: Boris Danilovich captured by Tver; 1305: Khan Toqta made Mikhail of Tver G. P. of Vladimir; 1305: Tverian campaign against Moscow; Tverian victory; 1305: Yury and Mikhail made temporary peace; 1306: Boris (released 1305) and Aleksandr Danilovich defected to Tver; 1307: Novgorod accepted Mikhail as prince; 1308: Tverian campaign against Moscow; Tverian victory	Principality of Tver: Mikhail of Tver; Boris Danilovich (1306–1308); Aleksandr Danilovich (1306–1308)	Principality of Moscow: Yury Danilovich of Moscow; Boris Danilovich (1304–1306); Aleksandr Danilovich (1304–1306)	Tverian victory
1314–1316	Struggle for Novgorod	Principality of Tver; Pro-Tver Novgorod Golden Horde	Principality of Moscow; Pro-Moscow Novgorod Golden Horde	Muscovite victory
1317	Battle of Bortenevo: Yury of Moscow campaign, supported by Özbeg Khan, against Mikhail of Tver	Principality of Tver	Principality of Moscow; Golden Horde Novgorod Republic	Tverian victory
1320–1322	Four Özbeg Khan punitive expeditions against Moscow	Golden Horde; Principality of Tver	Principality of Moscow; Novgorod Republic	Tverian victory: Dmitry of Tver made G. P. of Vladimir; Tver stole Yury of Moscow's treasury; Yury fled to Novgorod
1327	Tver Uprising of 1327	Golden Horde; Ivan I of Moscow; Aleksandr of Suzdal	Principality of Tver; G. P. of Vladimir (Note: The title 'Grand Prince of Vladimir' was mostly titular by the early 14th century.)	Golden Horde victory: Tver Uprising crushed with support from Moscow and Suzdal; Aleksandr of Tver exiled; Ivan I made G. P. of Vladimir
1340s–1350s	Inter-princely wars between the Kashin, Mikulin, Kholm, and Zubtsov appanages of Tver	Principality of Kashin other appanages	Principality of Mikulin other appanages	Victory of Mikhail II of Tver, appanage prince of Mikulin
1359–1381/2	Great Troubles: 1368–1372: Lithuanian–Muscovite War; Tver sided with Lithuania against Moscow; 1367–1375: Tverian–Muscovite war, ending with the 1375 Muscovite-led Siege of Tver (1375); Siege of Moscow (1382)	Mamai in Crimea: Lithuania; Tver; Ryazan; Tokhtamysh and allies: Timur	Khans at Sarai Khans at Sighnaq: Moscow and allies; Nizh. Nov.-Suzdal; other Horde warlords	Tokhtamysh victory: Treaty of Lyubutsk (1372); Moscow defeated Tver (1375); Tokhtamysh defeated Mamai (1381); Tokhtamysh defeated Moscow (1382)
1436–1453	Third period of the Muscovite War of Succession (overlapped with Vasily's Kazan war): Boris of Tver supported Vasily Vasilyevich against his uncle Dmitry Shemyaka from 1447; Siege of Kashin (1452)	Younger Donskoy line Vasily II Vasilyevich Mäxmüd of Kazan (1445–8); Boris of Tver (1447–53); Ivan of Mozhaysk (1445–7); Qasim Khan (1452–3)	Older Donskoy line Dmitry II Shemyaka (1439; 1445–53) Ulugh of Kazan (1437–45); Ivan of Mozhaysk (1447–53)	Vasily victory
1471	Muscovite–Novgorodian war of 1471: Battle of Shelon	Principality of Moscow; Principality of Tver; Qasim Khanate; Pskov Republic; Vyatka Republic	Novgorod Republic	Muscovite victory: Novgorod defeated with Tverian and Tatar support
1485	Muscovite conquest of Tver	Principality of Tver	Principality of Moscow	Muscovite victory: Tver annexed by Moscow

== See also ==
- Armies of the Rus' principalities
- List of wars involving Kievan Rus'
- List of wars and battles involving Galicia–Volhynia
- List of wars and battles involving the Golden Horde
- List of wars involving the Novgorod Republic
- List of wars involving the Principality of Moscow
- List of wars involving the Polish–Lithuanian Commonwealth
- List of wars and battles involving the Principality of Smolensk

== Bibliography ==
- Halperin, Charles J. (1987). Russia and the Golden Horde: The Mongol Impact on Medieval Russian History. Indiana University. p. 222. ISBN 9781850430575. (e-book).
- Halperin, Charles J. (2022). The Rise and Demise of the Myth of the Rus' Land (PDF). Leeds: Arc Humanities Press. p. 116. ISBN 9781802700565. Archived from the original (PDF) on 12 July 2024.
- Martin, Janet (2007). Medieval Russia: 980–1584. Second Edition. E-book. Cambridge: Cambridge University Press. ISBN 978-0-511-36800-4.
- Ostrowski, Donald (1993). "Why did the Metropolitan Move from Kiev to Vladimir in the Thirteenth Century". Christianity and the Eastern Slavs. Volume I: Slavic Cultures in the Middle Ages. Berkeley: University of California Press. pp. 83–101. ISBN 9780520360198. doi:10.1525/9780520313606-009
- Raffensperger, Christian; Ostrowski, Donald (2023). The Ruling Families of Rus: Clan, Family and Kingdom. London: Reaktion Books. p. 309. ISBN 978-1-78914-745-2. (e-book)
