= List of wars and battles involving the Golden Horde =

This is a list of wars and battles involving the Golden Horde since 1242, better known as the Great Horde from the 1430s to 1502.

Victory of the Golden Horde (and allies)
Defeat of the Golden Horde (and allies)
Another result*

*e.g. result unknown or indecisive/inconclusive, result of internal conflict inside the Golden Horde, status quo ante bellum, or a treaty or peace without a clear result.

Date	Conflict	Combatant 1	Combatant 2	Result
1242–1243	Mongol invasion of Bulgaria and Serbia	Mongol Empire: Golden Horde	Second Bulgarian Empire; Serbian Kingdom	Mongol victory
1252–1259	War between Galicia–Volhynia and the Golden Horde: Casus belli: For refusing to renew their jarligs upon the 1251 accession of Möngke Khan, Batu Khan sent punitive expeditions against Andrey II of Vladimir and Danylo of Halych; Nevryuy's campaign against Andrey (1252); Kuremsa's campaign against Danylo (c. 1252–1258); Boroldai/Burandai compelled Vasylko to join campaign against Lithuania (1258); Golden Horde invasion / ultimatum by Boroldai/Burandai (Nov 1259)	Golden Horde: Batu Khan; Sartaq Khan; Kuremsa; Boroldai/Burandai	Principality, since 1253 Kingdom of Galicia–Volhynia: Danylo of Halych; Vasylko Romanovych; Vladimir-Suzdal (1252): Andrey II of Vladimir	Golden Horde victory: Andrey was defeated and he fled (1252); Danylo crowned King of Ruthenia with Pope's support (1253), but planned crusade did not materialise; Danylo defeated Kuremsa (1252–1258); Danylo fled to Poland and Hungary (1259); Vasylko dismantled anti-Horde fortifications in Halych (1259); Danylo renewed his submission to Golden Horde
1253–1258	Mongol conquest of Persia and Mesopotamia (final phase): Mongol campaign against the Nizaris 1253–1256; Siege of Baghdad 1258	Mongol Empire: Golden Horde; Ilkhanate (from 1256)	Nizari Ismaili state Abbasid Caliphate	Mongol victory
1259–1260	Second Mongol invasion of Poland	Golden Horde	Fragmented Poland: Silesia; Masovia; Sandomierz; Kraków; Greater Poland	Golden Horde victory
1260–1264	Toluid Civil War: Berke–Hulegu war 1262; North Caucasus operations (1262–1263)	Golden Horde (Berke)	Ilkhanate (Hulegu)	Inconclusive: Initial division of the Mongol Empire
1263/4	Mongol invasion of Byzantine Thrace	Golden Horde	Byzantine Empire	Golden Horde victory
1268–1301	Kaidu–Kublai war	Chagatai Khanate; House of Ögedei; Golden Horde (until 1284)	Mongol Empire (1268–1270); Yuan dynasty (1271–1301); Ilkhanate; Golden Horde (after 1284)	Inconclusive: Definitive division of the Mongol Empire
1277–1280	Uprising of Ivaylo	Bulgarian nobility Byzantine Empire; Golden Horde	Ivaylo's Bulgarian rebels	Ivaylo military victory
1281– c. 1291	Vladimir-Suzdal war of succession (1281–1293): Casus belli: Dmitry of Pereslavl paid no homage to the new khan, Tuda Mengu; Andrey devastated Vladimir, Suzdal, and Pereslavl with Tuda Mengu's support (1281); Dmitry recaptured Pereslavl, Novgorod (1283) and Vladimir (1285) with Nogai's support	Andrey of Gorodets: Golden Horde khan at Sarai; Novgorod Republic; Principality of Rostov; Principality of Yaroslavl; Principality of Starodub	Dmitry of Pereslavl-Zalessky: Daumantas of Pskov; Principality of Tver; Principality of Moscow; Nogai Khan	Mixed results: Andrey made G. P. of Vladimir by khan Tuda Mengu at Sarai; Dmitry made G. P. of Vladimir by Nogai Khan; Stalemate until 1291
1285–1286	Second Mongol invasion of Hungary	Golden Horde; Kingdom of Galicia–Volhynia	Kingdom of Hungary	Hungarian victory
1287–1288	Third Mongol invasion of Poland: Battle of Łagów 1287 GH?; Battle of Stary Sącz 1288	Golden Horde; Kingdom of Galicia–Volhynia: Principality of Volhynia; Principality of Lutsk	Fragmented Poland: Sieradz; Sandomierz; Kraków; Kingdom of Hungary	Polish–Hungarian victory
1289	Rostov Uprising of 1289	Golden Horde	Principality of Rostov	Golden Horde victory: Uprising suppressed
1280s–1290s	Serbian conflict with the Nogai Horde	Nogai Horde; Golden Horde	Kingdom of Serbia; Kingdom of Syrmia; Kingdom of Hungary	Serbian victory
1293	Dyuden's campaign: Casus belli: Dmitry of Pereslavl, Mikhail of Tver and Daniel of Moscow paid no homage to Toqta	Dyuden (Golden Horde); Andrey of Gorodets; Theodore of Yaroslavl	Dmitry of Pereslavl; Mikhail of Tver; Daniel of Moscow	Golden Horde victory: Vladimir, Tver and Moscow ravaged; Andrey made G. P. of Vladimir
1294–1300	Nogai–Toqta conflict: Battle of Kahamlyk (Kagamlik); Sack of Kiev (1299)	Toqta	Nogai Khan	Toqta victory
1304–1308	Tverian–Muscovite war: Casus belli: death of Andrey of Gorodets; Key events: 1304: Battle of Pereslavl-Zalessky; Muscovite victory; 1304: Boris Danilovich captured by Tver; 1305: Khan Toqta made Mikhail of Tver G. P. of Vladimir; 1305: Tverian campaign against Moscow; Tverian victory; 1305: Yury and Mikhail made temporary peace; 1306: Boris (released 1305) and Aleksandr Danilovich defected to Tver; 1307: Novgorod accepted Mikhail as prince; 1308: Tverian campaign against Moscow; Tverian victory	Principality of Moscow: Yury Danilovich of Moscow; Boris Danilovich (1304–1306); Aleksandr Danilovich (1304–1306)	Principality of Tver: Mikhail of Tver; Boris Danilovich (1306–1308); Aleksandr Danilovich (1306–1308)	Tverian victory
1307–1308	1307–1308 siege of Caffa	Golden Horde	Genoese Gazaria; Republic of Genoa	Golden Horde victory
1314–1316	Struggle for Novgorod	Principality of Moscow; Pro-Moscow Novgorod Golden Horde	Principality of Tver; Pro-Tver Novgorod Golden Horde	Muscovite victory
1317	Battle of Bortenevo: Yury of Moscow campaign, supported by Özbeg Khan, against Mikhail of Tver	Principality of Moscow; Golden Horde	Principality of Tver	Tverian victory
1320–1322	Four Özbeg Khan punitive expeditions against Moscow	Golden Horde; Principality of Tver	Principality of Moscow; Novgorod Republic	Tverian victory: Dmitry of Tver made G. P. of Vladimir; Tver stole Yury of Moscow's treasury; Yury fled to Novgorod
1327	Tver Uprising of 1327	Golden Horde; Ivan I of Moscow; Aleksandr of Suzdal	Principality of Tver; G. P. of Vladimir (Note: The title 'Grand Prince of Vladimir' was mostly titular by the early 14th century.)	Golden Horde victory: Tver Uprising crushed with support from Moscow and Suzdal; Aleksandr of Tver exiled; Ivan I made G. P. of Vladimir
1340–1392	Galicia–Volhynia Wars	Grand Duchy of Lithuania; Ruthenian factions Golden Horde (Note: The warring parties' relations with various allies, in particular the Tatars, who alternately supported one side or the other, played an important role during the war.)	Kingdom of Poland: Duchy of Masovia; Kingdom of Hungary; Ruthenian factions Golden Horde	Polish–Lithuanian compromise: Union of Krewo (1389); Fall of the Kingdom of Galicia–Volhynia; Galicia to Poland; Volhynia to Lithuania
1343–1347	Siege of Caffa	Golden Horde	Genoese Gazaria; Republic of Genoa; Republic of Venice	Genoese victory
1359–1381/2	Great Troubles: 1362/3: Battle of Blue Waters; 1368–1372: Lithuanian–Muscovite War; Tver sided with Lithuania against Moscow; 1367–1375: Tverian–Muscovite war, ending with the 1375 Muscovite-led Siege of Tver (1375); Siege of Moscow (1382)	Mamai in Crimea: Lithuania; Tver; Ryazan; Tokhtamysh and allies: Timur	Khans at Sarai Khans at Sighnaq: Moscow and allies; Nizh. Nov.-Suzdal; other Horde warlords	Tokhtamysh victory: Lithuania defeated the Horde (1362/3); Treaty of Lyubutsk (1372); Moscow defeated Tver (1375); Moscow defeated Mamai (1380); Tokhtamysh defeated Mamai (1381); Tokhtamysh defeated Moscow (1382)
1386–1395	Tokhtamysh–Timur war: Battle of the Kondurcha River 1391; Battle of the Terek River 1395	Golden Horde: Tokhtamysh	Timurid Empire: Timur	Timurid victory
1399	Battle of the Vorskla River	Golden Horde	Grand Duchy of Lithuania: Principality of Kiev; Principality of Polotsk; Principality of Smolensk; Principality of Bryansk; Kingdom of Poland; Moldavia; Wallachia; Teutonic Order; Forces of Tokhtamysh	Golden Horde victory
1408	Edigu's campaign to Moscow	Golden Horde	Principality of Moscow	Golden Horde victory: Edigu attacked Moscow and extracted a ransom before retreating
1409–1411	Polish–Lithuanian–Teutonic War: Battle of Grunwald (1410)	Kingdom of Poland Duchies: Duchy of Płock; Duchy of Warsaw; Duchy of Belz; Duchy of Wizna; Duchy of Rawa; Duchy of Pomerania-Stolp; Duchy of Pomerania-Stargard; Principality of Moldavia; Grand Duchy of Lithuania: Principality of Smolensk; Duchy of Podolia; Tatars under Jalal al-Din (pretender to the Golden Horde throne)	Teutonic State Dependencies: Terra Mariana; Pomerania-Stettin; Duchy of Oels; Prince-Bishopric of Warmia; Bishopric of Pomesania; Bishopric of Chełmno; Bishopric of Sambia; Lizard Union; Allies: Kingdom of Denmark; Holy Roman Empire	Polish–Lithuanian victory: Jalal al-Din captured Sarai (1411) with Lithuanian support and was recognised as khan until 1412
1419–1440s	Fragmentation of the Golden Horde: Succession crises ever since Edigu's death (1419)	some Horde warlords	some Horde warlords	Fragmentation: Secession of the Uzbek Khanate (1428); Secession of the Khanate of Kazan (1438); Secession of the Crimean Khanate (1441); Secession of the Nogai Horde (1440s); Great Horde (first mentioned in the 1430s) survived as a rump state
1420	Siege of Sarai	Ulugh Muhammad (Note: Depends on whether or not Ulugh Muhammad was considered Golden/Great Horde khan at this time, when it was effectively locked in a war of succession. Ulugh had been claiming to be khan of the Golden Horde since 1419 (deaths of Edigu and Qadir Berdi). He had several competitors, including Hajji Muhammad (successor of Edigu in Sibir), Dawlat Berdi (1420s in Crimea), Barak Khan (1423–1429), Sayid Ahmad I (from 1427) and Küchük Muhammad (early 1430s). Ulugh lost control of the Golden Horde in 1436, first retreating to Crimea, then moving to Belyov in 1437, before settling in Kazan in 1438 and founding the Khanate of Kazan there.)	Dawlat Berdi	Dawlat Berdi victory
1437	Battle of Belyov	Ulugh Muhammad	Principality of Moscow	Ulugh Muhammad victory: Ulugh established Khanate of Kazan (1438)
1430s, 1442, 1453	Genoese–Great Horde conflicts with the Crimean Khanate	Great Horde; Genoese Gazaria; Republic of Genoa	Crimean Khanate; Principality of Theodoro (1442)	Inconclusive (Note: While the Genoese were able to withstand all Crimean attacks, Genoese Gazaria weakened after the fall of Constantinople, while Crimean–Ottoman relations strengthened. The Great Horde weakened the Crimean Khanate, thereby managing to assist the Genoese at crucial moments, while its own strength gradually waned.)
1460s	Genoese–Crimean conflict with the Great Horde	Great Horde	Genoese Gazaria; Crimean Khanate	Inconclusive
1470	Battle of Lipnic	Great Horde	Moldavia	Moldavian victory
1480	Great Stand on the Ugra River: 1480 Sarai raid	Great Horde	Principality of Moscow	Tactical Muscovite victory; strategically inconclusive
1486–1491	Great Horde–Crimean Khanate conflict (part of the Lithuanian–Muscovite War (1487–1494))	Great Horde; Grand Duchy of Lithuania; Kingdom of Poland	Crimean Khanate; Ottoman Empire; Principality of Moscow	Unclear
1500–1502	Crimean conquest of the Great Horde (part of the Lithuanian–Muscovite War (1500–1503)): Sack of New Sarai (1502); Battle of the Samara River	Great Horde; Grand Duchy of Lithuania; Livonian Confederation	Crimean Khanate; Moldavia; Ottoman Empire; Principality of Moscow	Crimean victory: End of the Great Horde

== See also ==
Successor states of the Golden Horde

- Timeline of the Golden Horde
- Kiev in the Golden Horde period
- List of wars involving Kievan Rus'
- List of wars and battles involving Galicia–Volhynia
- List of wars involving the Novgorod Republic
- List of wars involving the Principality of Moscow
- List of wars involving the Polish–Lithuanian Commonwealth
- List of wars and battles involving the Principality of Smolensk

== Bibliography ==
- Atwood, Christopher P. (2004). Encyclopedia of Mongolia and the Mongol Empire. Facts On File.
- Halperin, Charles J. (1987). Russia and the Golden Horde: The Mongol Impact on Medieval Russian History. Indiana University. p. 222. ISBN 9781850430575. (e-book).
- Halperin, Charles J. (2022). The Rise and Demise of the Myth of the Rus' Land (PDF). Leeds: Arc Humanities Press. p. 116. ISBN 9781802700565. Archived from the original (PDF) on 12 July 2024.
- Hrushevsky, Mykhailo (1901). Хронологія Подій Галицько-волинського Літопису [Chronology of the Events of the Halych–Volyn Chronicle] (in Ukrainian). Lviv: Records of the Shevchenko Scientific Society.
- Martin, Janet (2007). Medieval Russia: 980–1584. Second Edition. E-book. Cambridge: Cambridge University Press. ISBN 978-0-511-36800-4.
- Ostrowski, Donald (1993). "Why did the Metropolitan Move from Kiev to Vladimir in the Thirteenth Century". Christianity and the Eastern Slavs. Volume I: Slavic Cultures in the Middle Ages. Berkeley: University of California Press. pp. 83–101. ISBN 9780520360198. doi:10.1525/9780520313606-009
- Raffensperger, Christian; Ostrowski, Donald (2023). The Ruling Families of Rus: Clan, Family and Kingdom. London: Reaktion Books. p. 309. ISBN 978-1-78914-745-2. (e-book)
- Vásáry, István (2012). "The Crimean Khanate and the Great Horde (1440s–1500s): A Fight for Primacy" (PDF). In Meinolf Arens; Denise Klein (eds.). Das frühneuzeitliche Krimkhanat (16.-18. Jahrhundert) zwischen Orient und Okzident. Harrassowitz: Wiesbaden. pp. 13–26.
