= List of wars involving the Principality of Moscow =

This is a list of wars involving the Principality of Moscow (1263–1547), also known as Muscovy. (Note: The Principality of Moscow or Muscovy (1263–1547) evolved out of the Principality of Vladimir-Suzdal (existed 12th–13th century), and became the Tsardom of Russia in 1547.)

Date	Conflict	Combatant 1	Combatant 2	Result
1281–1293/4	Vladimir-Suzdal war of succession (1281–1293): Casus belli: death of Alexander Nevsky (1263).; Duden's campaign (summer–autumn 1293) (part of the Tokhta–Nogai war)	Nogai forces Dmitry of Pereslavl; Mikhail of Tver; Daniel of Moscow	Tode Mongke (1281–1287); Tokhta forces Andrey of Gorodets; Theodore the Black; Rostov princes	Tokhta victory: Vladimir, Moscow and Tver sacked, countryside devastated; Dmitry of Pereslavl fled, died in 1294; Andrey of Gorodets became indisputed Grand Prince of Vladimir
1296/8–1302	Struggle for Pereslavl-Zalessky	Daniel of Moscow; Mikhail of Tver Tokhta	Andrey of Gorodets; Theodore the Black; Konstantin of Ryazan	Muscovite–Tverian victory: Moscow sacked (1298); Moscow temporarily acquired Pereslavl-Zalessky (lost in 1340/1)
1305–1485	Muscovite–Tverian wars (series of short wars, mixed with other conflicts)	Principality of Moscow	Principality of Tver	Victory: Tver annexed by Moscow (1485)
1327	Tver Uprising of 1327 (part of the Muscovite–Tverian wars)	Golden Horde; Ivan I Kalita of Moscow; Alexander of Suzdal	Principality of Tver; Grand Principality of Vladimir (Note: The title 'Grand Prince of Vladimir' was mostly titular by the early 14th century.)	Golden Horde victory: Aleksandr of Tver stripped of land holdings and later executed
1368–1372	Lithuanian–Muscovite War (1368–72) (part of the Great Troubles and the Muscovite–Tverian wars)	Principality of Moscow	Grand Duchy of Lithuania Principality of Tver	Inconclusive: Treaty of Lyubutsk
1376	Muscovite–Volga Bulgars war (part of the Great Troubles)	Principality of Moscow	Volga Bulgaria	Victory
1377	Battle on Pyana River (part of the Great Troubles)	Principality of Moscow	Golden Horde	Defeat
1378	Battle of the Vozha River (part of the Great Troubles)	Principality of Moscow	Golden Horde	Victory
1380	Battle of Kulikovo (part of the Great Troubles)	Rus' principalities: Principality of Moscow (Dmitri Donskoy); Principality of Beloozero; Principality of Yaroslavl; Principality of Rostov; Principality of Starodub; Principality of Mologa; Principality of Kashin; Princes from Vyazma and Dorogobuzh; Part of Upper Oka Principalities; Lithuanian princes of Polotsk and Bryansk in exile	Western part of the Golden Horde: European mercenaries	Victory for the Rus' principalities coalition: Moscow replaced Tver as the most prominent of the northeastern Rus' principalities
1382	Siege of Moscow (part of the aftermath of the Great Troubles)	Principality of Moscow	Golden Horde	Defeat: Dmitri Donskoy forced to reaffirm allegiance to the Golden Horde, and resumed paying the tribute
1406–1408	Lithuanian–Muscovite War (1406–1408) (part of the Muscovite–Lithuanian Wars)	Principality of Moscow	Grand Duchy of Lithuania	Hungarian Treaty (1 September 1408): Lithuania receives Principality of Smolensk and Upper Oka Principalities; Muscovy receives the cities of Kozelsk, Lyubutsk and Peremyshl
1425–1453	Muscovite War of Succession	Younger Donskoy line Vasily II Vasilyevich; Dmitry II Shemyaka (1434–9); Boris of Tver (c. 1438); Mäxmüd of Kazan (1445–8); Qasim Khan (1452–3)	Older Donskoy line Yury Dmitrievich (1425–34); Vasily Kosoy (1434–6); Ulugh of Kazan (1437–45); Dmitry II Shemyaka (1439; 1445–53); Ivan of Mozhaysk (1447–53)	Vasily II victory: Younger lineage of Dmitry Donskoy gained the Muscovite throne
1437–1445	Ulugh Muhammad's campaign (first Russo-Kazan war) (from Battle of Belyov to Battle of Suzdal) (connected with the Muscovite War of Succession)	Younger Donskoy line Vasily II Vasilyevich; Dmitry II Shemyaka (1437–9)	Older Donskoy line Ulugh of Kazan; Dmitry II Shemyaka (1439)	Ulugh victory: Ulugh captured Vasily II Vasilyevich (1445); Ulugh's successor Mäxmüd made Vasily II his vassal; Dmitry Shemyaka seized Moscow in Vasily II's absence
1467–1469	Qasim War	Grand Principality of Moscow: Qasim Khanate	Khanate of Kazan	Victory: Kazan released all ethnic Christian Russians enslaved in the preceding four decades
1471	Battle of Shelon	Grand Principality of Moscow	Novgorod Republic	Victory: Novgorod Republic annexed by the Grand Principality of Moscow in 1478
1478	Siege of Kazan	Grand Principality of Moscow	Khanate of Kazan	Victory: The Kazan Khan imprisoned and replaced by his half-brother
1480	Great Stand on the Ugra River	Grand Principality of Moscow	Golden Horde	Debated: Traditional Russian historiography: Muscovite victory, and the end of the Mongol-Tatar yoke in Russia; Modern Western scholarly historiography: Insignificant non-battle, embellished in later accounts; Moscow retained formal relations with Tatar khanates and continued paying tribute to the Crimean Khanate for decades
1480–1481	Russian-Livonian War (1480-1481)	Russia	Livonian Confederation	Victory
1485	Capture of Tver (1485) (part of the Muscovite–Tverian wars)	Grand Principality of Moscow	Principality of Tver	Victory: Principality of Tver annexed by the Grand Principality of Moscow
1487–1494	First Muscovite-Lithuanian War	Grand Principality of Moscow	Grand Duchy of Lithuania	Victory
1495–1497	Russo-Swedish War	Grand Principality of Moscow	Sweden	Inconclusive
1500–1503	Second Muscovite–Lithuanian War	Grand Principality of Moscow	Grand Duchy of Lithuania Livonian Order	Victory
1505–1507	Russo-Kazan War	Grand Principality of Moscow	Khanate of Kazan	Inconclusive
1507–1508	Third Muscovite–Lithuanian War	Grand Principality of Moscow	Grand Duchy of Lithuania Crimean Khanate	Inconclusive
1512–1522	Fourth Muscovite–Lithuanian War	Grand Principality of Moscow Livonian Order	Grand Duchy of Lithuania: Kingdom of Poland; Crimean Khanate	Victory
1534–1537	Fifth Muscovite–Lithuanian War	Grand Principality of Moscow	Grand Duchy of Lithuania: Kingdom of Poland; Crimean Khanate	Inconclusive

== See also ==
- Armies of the Rus' principalities
- Landed Army
- List of wars involving Kievan Rus'
- List of wars and battles involving Galicia–Volhynia
- List of wars and battles involving the Golden Horde
- List of wars involving the Novgorod Republic
- List of wars and battles involving the Principality of Smolensk
- List of wars involving the Principality of Tver
- List of wars involving Lithuania
- List of wars involving the Polish–Lithuanian Commonwealth
- List of wars involving Russia
- Timeline of the Golden Horde

== Bibliography ==
- Alef, Gustave (1956). A history of the Muscovite civil war: the reign of Vasili II (1425–1462) (PhD).
- Alef, Gustave (1983). "The Battle of Suzdal' in 1445. An Episode in the Muscovite War of Succession (1978)". Rulers and nobles in fifteenth century Muscovy. Part II. London: Variorum Reprints. pp. 11–20. ISBN 9780860781202. (first published in Forschungen zur osteuropäischen Geschichte 25 (1978) Berlin.)
- Halperin, Charles J. (1987). Russia and the Golden Horde: The Mongol Impact on Medieval Russian History. p. 222. ISBN 9781850430575. (e-book).
- Martin, Janet (1995). Medieval Russia: 980–1584. New York: Cambridge University Press. ISBN 0521362768.
- Martin, Janet (2007). Medieval Russia: 980–1584. 2nd ed. E-book. Cambridge: Cambridge University Press. ISBN 978-0-511-36800-4.
- Ostrowski, Donald (1993). "Why did the Metropolitan Move from Kiev to Vladimir in the Thirteenth Century". Christianity and the Eastern Slavs. Volume I: Slavic Cultures in the Middle Ages. Berkeley: University of California Press. pp. 83–101. ISBN 9780520360198. doi:10.1525/9780520313606-009
- Shaikhutdinov, Marat (2021). "3.4 Invasion of Tokhtamysh". Between East and West: The Formation of the Moscow State. Academic Studies Press. pp. 104–107. ISBN 9781644697153.
- Гумилев, Лев (2023). От Руси к России (in Russian). Moscow: Москва. ISBN 978-5-17-153845-3.
