= List of wars involving Lithuania =

This is a list of wars, armed conflicts and rebellions involving Lithuania throughout its history as a kingdom (1251–1263), grand duchy (1236–1251; 1263–1795, although part of the Polish–Lithuanian Commonwealth during 1569–1795) and a modern republic (1918–1940; 1990 – present), including as well the uprisings of the 19th and 20th centuries to recreate Lithuanian statehood. Dates indicate the years in which Lithuania was involved in the war. Notable militarised interstate disputes are included.

Victory of Lithuania (and allies)
Defeat of Lithuania (and allies)
Another result*

*e.g. result unknown or indecisive/inconclusive, result of internal conflict inside Lithuania, status quo ante bellum, or a treaty or peace without a clear result.

== Kingdom of Lithuania ==
- Mongol invasions of Lithuania (1258–1259, 1275, 1279, and 1325)

== Grand Duchy of Lithuania ==
=== 14th century ===
Date	Conflict	Combatant 1	Combatant 2	Result for Lithuania and/or its allies
1340–1392	Galicia–Volhynia Wars	Grand Duchy of Lithuania; Golden Horde	Kingdom of Poland; Kingdom of Hungary; Duchy of Masovia	Galicia–Volhynia divided between Poland and Lithuania
1368–1372	Lithuanian–Muscovite War (1368–1372)	Grand Duchy of Lithuania; Principality of Tver	Grand Duchy of Moscow	Lithuanian retreat (Treaty of Lyubutsk)
1377–1387	War of the Lithuanian Succession (1377–1387)	Grand Duchy of Lithuania; Jogaila	Grand Duchy of Lithuania; Andrei of Polotsk	Jogaila victory
1381–1384	Lithuanian Civil War (1381–1384)	Duchy of Samogitia; Kęstutis; Vytautas	Grand Duchy of Lithuania; Jogaila; Skirgaila	Temporary reconciliation
1389–1392	Lithuanian Civil War (1389–1392)	Duchy of Samogitia	Grand Duchy of Lithuania; Kingdom of Poland	Ostrów Agreement

=== 15th century ===
Date	Conflict	Combatant 1	Combatant 2	Result for Lithuania and/or its allies
1409–1411	Polish–Lithuanian–Teutonic War	Grand Duchy of Lithuania; Kingdom of Poland	Teutonic Order	Peace of Thorn (1411)
1414	Hunger War	Grand Duchy of Lithuania; Kingdom of Poland	Teutonic Order	Mediation at the Council of Constance
1422	Golub War	Grand Duchy of Lithuania; Kingdom of Poland; Moldavia	Teutonic Order	Victory
1431–1435	Polish–Teutonic War (1431–1435)	Kingdom of Poland	Teutonic Order	Victory: Peace of Brześć Kujawski
1432–1438	Lithuanian Civil War (1432–1438)	Sigismund Kęstutaitis; Grand Duchy of Lithuania; Kingdom of Poland	Švitrigaila; Grand Duchy of Rus; Teutonic Order; Livonian Order; Golden Horde; Principality of Moldavia	Svitrigaila's defeat
1487–1494	Lithuanian–Muscovite War (1487–1494)	Grand Duchy of Lithuania; Golden Horde	Principality of Moscow; Crimean Khanate	Defeat

=== 16th century ===
Date	Conflict	Combatant 1	Combatant 2	Result for Lithuania and/or its allies
1500–1503	Lithuanian–Muscovite War (1500–1503)	Grand Duchy of Lithuania; Livonian Confederation	Principality of Moscow; Crimean Khanate; Pskov Republic; Principality of Novgorod-Seversk	Defeat
1507–1508	Lithuanian–Muscovite War (1507–1508)	Grand Duchy of Lithuania; Kingdom of Poland	Principality of Moscow	Disputed
1508	Glinski Rebellion	Grand Duchy of Lithuania	Glinski supporters	Government's victory
1512–1522	Lithuanian–Muscovite War (1512–1522)	Grand Duchy of Lithuania; Kingdom of Poland	Principality of Moscow	Defeat
1524	Ottoman-Tatar invasion of Lithuania and Poland	Grand Duchy of Lithuania; Kingdom of Poland	Ottoman-Tatars	
1534–1537	Lithuanian–Muscovite War (1534–1537)	Grand Duchy of Lithuania; Kingdom of Poland	Principality of Moscow	Disputed
1561–1570	Northern Seven Years' War	Polish–Lithuanian union Free City of Lübeck; Denmark–Norway	Kingdom of Sweden	Treaty of Stettin (1570)

== Polish–Lithuanian Commonwealth ==
This is a list of wars involving the Polish–Lithuanian Commonwealth (1569–1795). (Note: Also known as the Kingdom of Poland and the Grand Duchy of Lithuania, Poland–Lithuania, Republic of Both Nations, Rzeczpospolita, Žečpospolita, Річ Посполита (Rich Pospolyta), and other names.)

Victory
Defeat
Another result*

*e.g. result unknown or indecisive/inconclusive, result of internal conflict inside Poland–Lithuania, status quo ante bellum, or a treaty or peace without a clear result.

Date	Conflict	Combatant 1	Combatant 2	Results
1558–1583	Livonian War: Russian invasion of Livonia (1558–1560); Lithuanian–Muscovite war (1562–1570); Truce 1570–1576; Livonian campaign of Stephen Báthory (1577–1582)	Livonian Confederation (1558–61, Lithuanian protectorate since 1559); Grand Duchy of Lithuania (1559–61, 1562–69); From 1569: Polish–Lithuanian Commonwealth (1569–70, 1577–82); Principality of Transylvania (1577–82); Crimean Khanate Denmark–Norway (1560–62, 75–83); Kingdom of Sweden (1560–64, 70–75, 77–83); Zaporozhian Cossacks	Tsardom of Russia: Qasim Khanate	Polish–Lithuanian, Dano–Norwegian and Swedish victory: Livonia, Courland and Semigallia to Poland–Lithuania; Estonia to Sweden; Ösel to Denmark–Norway; Military and economic disaster for Russia (Muscovy) (Note: "Skrynnikov's data support the conclusion that the combination of the oprichnina and the Livonian War, which wrought economic havoc on their estates, ruined many pomeshchiki and weakened Muscovy's military might. (...) the human and economic resources on much of that territory were exhausted." "The reign of Ivan IV the Terrible was, in short, a disaster for Muscovy. (...) his subjects were impoverished, his economic resources depleted, his army weakened, and his realm militarily defeated.")
1587–1588	War of the Polish Succession (1587–1588): Siege of Kraków; Battle of Byczyna	Sigismund III: Supporters of Sigismund Vasa, mainly Poles	Maximilian III: Supporters of Maximilian of Austria, mainly Germans, but including many Poles and Hungarians	Sigismund victory
1598–1599	War against Sigismund	Polish–Swedish union under Sigismund III: Polish–Lithuanian Commonwealth; (Sweden) Swedish Empire	(Sweden) Protestant Swedish separatists: Duke Charles of Södermanland	Defeat: End of Polish–Swedish union; Charles became king of Sweden (1604)
1600–1629	Polish–Swedish War (1600–1629): Polish–Swedish War (1600–1611); Polish–Swedish War (1617–1618); Polish–Swedish War (1621–1625); Polish–Swedish War (1626–1629)	Polish–Lithuanian Commonwealth; Holy Roman Empire (1626–29)	Kingdom of Sweden (known as (yes) Swedish Empire after 1611)	Defeat: 1611: disputed; status quo; 1618: Swedish victory; 1625: Swedish victory; 1629: Swedish victory
1605–1618	Polish–Muscovite War (1605–1618) (Dmytriads)	Polish–Lithuanian Commonwealth; False Dmitry I False Dmitry II	Tsardom of Russia (yes) Swedish Empire; Don Cossacks	Costly victory: Polish–Lithuanian Commonwealth reached largest territorial extent; Sigismund renounced Russian throne
1606–1608	Zebrzydowski Rebellion	Polish–Lithuanian Commonwealth	Rokosz	Government victory
1618–1648	Thirty Years' War: Battle of Humenné	Polish–Lithuanian Commonwealth; Holy Roman Empire; Spanish Empire; Kingdom of Hungary	(yes) Swedish Empire; Denmark; Dutch Republic; Kingdom of France	Peace of Westphalia
1620–1621	Polish–Ottoman War (1620–1621)	Polish–Lithuanian Commonwealth Zaporozhian Cossacks	Ottoman Empire Crimean Khanate Principality of Wallachia	Treaty of Khotyn
1632–1634	Smolensk War	Polish–Lithuanian Commonwealth; Zaporozhian Cossacks	Tsardom of Russia	Victory: Treaty of Polyanovka (Polanów)
1633–1634	Polish–Ottoman War (1633–1634)	Polish–Lithuanian Commonwealth	Ottoman Empire Crimean Khanate Principality of Wallachia Principality of Moldavia Budjak Horde	Inconclusive
1648–1657	Khmelnytsky Uprising	Polish–Lithuanian Commonwealth Crimean Khanate	Cossack Hetmanate Crimean Khanate	Defeat: Loss of the Cossack Hetmanate (vassalised by the Tsardom of Russia); The Ruin (Ukrainian history)
1654–1667	Russo-Polish War (1654–1667)	Polish–Lithuanian Commonwealth; Cossack Hetmanate; Crimean Khanate; Brandenburg-Prussia	Tsardom of Russia; Cossack Hetmanate	Defeat
1655–1661	Second Northern War: The (Russo-)Swedish Deluge (in Poland); The Ruin (in Ukraine)	Polish–Lithuanian Commonwealth; Denmark–Norway; Habsburg Monarchy; Tsardom of Russia (1656–1658); Crimean Khanate; Dutch Republic; Brandenburg-Prussia (1655–1656, 1657–1660)	(yes) Swedish Empire; Principality of Transylvania; Cossack Hetmanate (1657); Grand Duchy of Lithuania; Wallachia; Moldavia; Brandenburg-Prussia (1656–1657)	Treaty of Oliva
1667–1671	Polish–Cossack–Tatar War (1666–1671)	Polish–Lithuanian Commonwealth	Crimean Khanate; Cossack Hetmanate	Victory: Polish–Ottoman War (1672–1676)
1672–1676	Polish–Ottoman War (1672–1676)	Polish–Lithuanian Commonwealth; Wallachia	Ottoman Empire; Crimean Khanate; Principality of Moldavia; Cossack Hetmanate; Lipka Tatars	Defeat: Treaty of Buchach; Treaty of Żurawno
1683–1699	Great Turkish War: Polish–Ottoman War (1683–1699); Russo-Turkish War (1686–1700)	Holy Roman Empire HRE states: Habsburg monarchy; (Electorate of Bavaria) Bavaria; Franconia; Saxony; Swabia; Duchy of Styria; Royal Hungary; Kingdom of Croatia; Duchy of Mantua; Polish–Lithuanian Commonwealth; Tsardom of Russia: Cossack Hetmanate; Republic of Venice; Spanish Empire; Montenegro rebel factions: Albanian rebels; Serbian rebels; Greek rebels; Bulgarian rebels; Romanian rebels; Croatian rebels	Ottoman Empire Vassal states: Crimean Khanate; Shamkhalate of Tarki; Upper Hungary (1683–5); Moldavia; Wallachia; Transylvania	Treaty of Karlowitz
1697–1702	Lithuanian Civil War (1697–1702)	House of Sapieha	Radziwiłł; House of Wiśniowiecki; Pac family Ogiński family	
1700–1721	Great Northern War: Civil war in Poland (1704–1706); (list of battles)	(yes) Swedish Empire; Holstein-Gottorp (1700–1714); Warsaw Confederation (1704–1709); Ottoman Empire (1710–1714); Crimean Khanate (1710–1714); Cossack Hetmanate (1708–1714); Dutch Republic (1700); England (1700); Scotland (1700); Ireland (1700); (Kingdom of Great Britain) Great Britain (1719–1720)	Tsardom of Russia; Cossack Hetmanate; Kalmyk Khanate; (Electorate of Saxony) Saxony (1700–1706, 1709–1719); Duchy of Courland (1700–1701); Polish–Lithuanian Commonwealth (1701–1704, 1709–1719); Sandomierz Confederation (1704–1709); Denmark–Norway (1700, 1709–1720); (Kingdom of Prussia) Prussia (1715–1720); (Electorate of Brunswick-Lüneburg) Hanover (1715–1719); (Kingdom of Great Britain) Great Britain (1717–1719); Montenegro (1711–1712); Moldavia (1711)	Inconclusive for the Polish–Lithuanian Commonwealth: Treaty of Altranstädt (1706); 1720 Stockholm ceasefire offer; not signed by Poland–Lithuania or Saxony; 1729 Stockholm peace declaration; signed by Saxony; 1732 peace declaration; signed by Poland–Lithuania
1704–1706	Civil war in Poland (1704–1706) (part of the Great Northern War)	Warsaw Confederation; Supported by: (yes) Swedish Empire	Sandomierz Confederation; Supported by: Tsardom of Russia	Warsaw Confederation victory: Treaty of Altranstädt
1733–1738	War of the Polish Succession	Poland loyal to Stanisław I Supported by: Kingdom of France; Kingdom of Spain; Duchy of Savoy; Kingdom of Sardinia; Duchy of Parma	Poland loyal to Augustus III; Supported by: Russian Empire; Habsburg monarchy Holy Roman Empire (from 1734); Electorate of Saxony; Kingdom of Prussia	Treaty of Vienna (1738): Augustus III confirmed as king of Poland and grand duke of Lithuania; Stanisław received Lorraine as compensation
1768–1772	War of the Bar Confederation (list of battles)	Bar Confederation	Polish–Lithuanian Commonwealth; Russian Empire; Kingdom of Prussia; Habsburg monarchy (Note: The Habsburg monarchy (Austria) did not engage in active hostilities during the War of the Bar Confederation, but it did join Russia and Prussia in carrying out the First Partition of Poland in the war's aftermath in 1772, occupying Commonwealth towns and cities in its allotted partition.)	Defeat of the Bar Confederation: First Partition of Poland (1772)
1792	Polish–Russian War of 1792 (list of battles)	Polish–Lithuanian Commonwealth	(Russia) Russian Empire; Targowica Confederation	Defeat: Constitution of 3 May 1791; Second Partition of Poland (1792)
1794	Kościuszko Uprising (list of battles)	Polish–Lithuanian Commonwealth: Tadeusz Kościuszko; Jan Henryk Dąbrowski	(Russia) Russian Empire; Kingdom of Prussia; Habsburg monarchy (Note: The Habsburg monarchy (Austria) did not engage in active hostilities during the Kościuszko Uprising, but it did join Russia and Prussia in carrying out the Third Partition of Poland in the uprising's aftermath.)	Defeat: Third Partition of Poland (1795): Polish– Lithuanian Commonwealth ceased to exist.

== 19th-century uprisings against the Russian Empire ==
Date	Conflict	Combatant 1	Combatant 2	Result for Lithuania and/or its allies
1830–1831	November Uprising	Congress Poland	Russian Empire	Defeat
1863–1865	January Uprising	Polish National Government	Russian Empire	Defeat

== 20th century ==
=== Interwar Lithuania (1918–1940) ===
Date	Conflict	Combatant 1	Combatant 2	Result for Lithuania and/or its allies
1918–1919	Lithuanian–Soviet War	Lithuania; Saxon Volunteers	Russian SFSR; Socialist Soviet Republic of Lithuania and Belorussia	Victory: Lithuanian independence protected against Soviet attempt to destroy it
1919	War against the Bermontians	Lithuania	West Russian Volunteer Army	Victory: Lithuanian independence saved
1919–1920	Polish–Lithuanian War	Lithuania	Poland	Defeat: Lithuania loses its capital Vilnius but protects its independence against Poland; Lithuanian authorities prevented the 1919 Polish coup attempt in Lithuania; During the entire interwar period Lithuania refused to legally recognize Vilnius as a part of Poland and in 1939 Lithuania by concluding the Soviet–Lithuanian Mutual Assistance Treaty reacquired about one fifth of the historic Vilnius Region, including the capital city of Vilnius
1923	Klaipėda Revolt	Lithuania: Lithuanian Riflemen's Union; Directorate of the Klaipėda Region	(France) French administration	Victory: Klaipėda Region rebecomes part of Lithuania according to the Klaipėda Convention
1938	Polish ultimatum to Lithuania	Lithuania	Poland	Defeat: Lithuania accepts the ultimatum
1939	German ultimatum to Lithuania	Lithuania	Nazi Germany	Defeat: Klaipėda Region ceded to Nazi Germany
1940	Soviet occupation of the Baltic states	Estonia Latvia Lithuania	Soviet Union (Estonian Soviet Socialist Republic) Estonian Communist Party (Latvian Soviet Socialist Republic) Latvian Communist Party (Lithuanian Soviet Socialist Republic) Lithuanian Communist Party; Diplomatic support: Germany	Soviet victory: Soviet troops militarily occupy the Baltic states; Baltic governments deposed; Rigged elections produce communist governments under Soviet control, which request admission to the USSR; Baltic states annexed de facto as republics of the Soviet Union, not widely recognized by the outside world; Beginning of partisan resistance to Soviet rule

=== Lithuania under occupation ===
Date	Conflict	Combatant 1	Combatant 2	Result for Lithuania and/or its allies
1941	June Uprising in Lithuania	Provisional Government of Lithuania: Lithuanian Activist Front	Soviet Union: Red Army; NKVD	Lithuanian victory: Soviet forces expelled; Provisional Government of Lithuania established; Independence of Lithuania declared; Beginning of the Holocaust in Lithuania
1941–1944	German occupation of Lithuania	(Lithuania) Lithuanian anti-Nazi resistance	Nazi Germany	Inconclusive
1944–1956	Guerilla war in the Baltic states	Lithuanian partisans Latvian partisans Estonian partisans	Soviet Union: Lithuanian SSR; Latvian SSR; Estonian SSR	Soviet victory

=== Lithuania's independence restored (1990s) ===
Date	Conflict	Combatant 1	Combatant 2	Result for Lithuania and/or its allies
1990–1991	Soviet OMON assaults on Lithuanian border posts	Lithuania: State Border Guard Service	Soviet Union: OMON	Lithuanian victory: Lithuanian statehood preserved
1991	January Events	Lithuania: Department of National Defense; Lithuanian Riflemen's Union	Soviet Union: Soviet Army; 76th Airborne Division; KGB; Alpha Group; (Lithuanian Soviet Socialist Republic) National Salvation Committee of the Lithuanian SSR	Lithuanian victory: Soviet forces withdraw from the cities; Lithuanian statehood preserved

== 21st century ==
- 2001, War in Afghanistan
- 2003, Iraq War

== See also ==
- History of Europe
- List of wars
- Military of Lithuania
- List of wars involving Belarus
- List of wars involving Estonia
- List of wars and battles involving Galicia–Volhynia
- List of wars and battles involving the Golden Horde
- List of wars involving Kievan Rus'
- List of wars involving Latvia
- List of wars involving the Principality of Moscow
- List of wars involving the Novgorod Republic
- List of wars and battles involving the Principality of Smolensk
- List of wars involving the Principality of Tver
- List of wars involving Poland
- List of wars involving Russia
- List of wars involving Ukraine

== Bibliography ==
- Bánlaky, József (1942). "Az 1619. évi hadjárat. (The campaign of 1619)". A magyar nemzet hadtörténelme [The military history of the Hungarian people] (in Hungarian). Vol. XV. Bocskay István, Báthory Gábor és Bethlen Gábor időszaka (1604–1626). Budapest.
- Bentkowska, Anna (2003). "John Sobieski [Jan III; Jana III; John III], King of Poland". Oxford Art Online. Oxford University Press. doi:10.1093/gao/9781884446054.article.t045004. ISBN 978-1-884446-05-4.
- Brandišauskas, Valentinas (21 June 2018). Tutlys, Sigitas (ed.). "Birželio sukilimas". Visuotinė lietuvių enciklopedija (in Lithuanian).
- Hrushevsky, Mykhailo (2003). "Between Moscow and Sweden". Illustrated History of Ukraine (in Russian). Donetsk: BAO. ISBN 966-548-571-7.
- Martin, Janet (2007). Medieval Russia: 980–1584. Second Edition. E-book. Cambridge: Cambridge University Press. ISBN 978-0-511-36800-4.
- Moorehouse, Roger (2014). The Devils' Alliance: Hitler's Pact with Stalin, 1939-1941. New York: Basic Books. ISBN 978-0-465-03075-0.
