= Great Troubles =

14th-century Golden Horde war of succession

Great Troubles Golden Horde Dynastic War
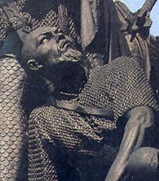
- A statue of Mamai as part of the Millennium of Russia monument (erected in 1862)
| Date | 1359–1381 (1382) |
| Location | Golden Horde |
| Result | Defeat of Mamai by Tokhtamysh; Batu's dynasty falls (1360), many pretender-khans wage war; Lithuania conquers Kiev (1362/3), but not Moscow (1368–72); Muscovy pre-eminent amongst Rus' principalities (1380); Tokhtamysh takes over Golden Horde as undisputed khan (1381); Tokhtamysh sacks Moscow |

Belligerents
| 1360s Khans at Sarai; Muscovy (1362–3); Suzdal (1363–?) | 1360s Mamai in Crimea; Muscovy (1363–70; 1370–74) | c. 1361–79; Khans at Sighnaq c. 1362–72 Lithuania; Moldavia; Tver; Ryazan |
| 1361–4; Murād, Gülistan | 1361–68/78; Tagai, Mukhsha | 1361–76; Bolgar ulus |
| 1370s–82 Tokhtamysh; Timur; Suzdal (1382) (Note: Nizhny Novgorod-Suzdal joined Muscovy during the 1376 campaign against Bolghar, and fought under Donskoy at Kulikovo in 1380, but in 1382 the Suzdalians played a crucial role in capturing Moscow by deception, allowing Tokhtamysh to sack the Muscovite capital.) | 1370s–81 Mamai in Crimea; Tver (Note: The 1375 Muscovy-led expedition forced Tver to sign a treaty recognising Moscow's superiority and to pledge military support in the case of a conflict; however, no Tverian troops were sent to reinforce Donskoy's anti-Mamai coalition at Kulikovo in 1380.); Ryazan; Lithuania (1380) (Note: In 1380, Lithuania was allied with Mamai, but the Lithuanians arrived too late to aid him; they retreated at the news of Mamai's defeat at Kulikovo.) | c. 1375–1380; Donskoy's coalition Muscovy; Suzdal (c. 1376–80) |

Commanders and leaders
| Khans at Sarai: 59–60 Qulpa; 60 Nowruz Beg; 60–1 Khiḍr Khan; 61 Timur Khwaja; 61 Ordu Malik; 61–2 Kildi Beg; 62 Murad; 62–4 Khayr Pulad; 64–7 Aziz Shaykh; 67–9 ʿAbdallāh; 70–1 Tūlūn; 71–3 Mamat-Sultan; 73–5 Urus Khan; 75–7 Qāghān Beg; 77–80 Arab Shah; 1380–1395: Tokhtamysh | Mamai (d. 1381); Mamai's puppet-khans: ʿAbdallāh; Tūlūn; Mamat-Sultan; Tulak; Mamai's allies: Mikhail II of Tver; Dmitry Donskoy of Moscow (1363–early 1370s) | Urus Khan (d. 1377); Toqtaqiya; Temur-Malik Algirdas; Bogdan I Bolgar ulus: 61–68 Bulat-Timur –76 Hassan Dmitry Donskoy of Moscow |

The Great Troubles (Note: "Of course Chingissids killed each other all the time, especially in the recent past, during the "Troubles" in the Juchid ulus in the 1360s–1370s.") (Russian: Великая замятня, romanized: Velikaya zamyatnya, from Old East Slavic замѧтьнѧ, as found in Rus' chronicles (Note: One example is the Novgorod First Chronicle entry for the year 6868 (1360), which according to the 1914 Oxford English translation says: 'The same year there was a great tumult in the Horde: many Tsars with their wives and children were killed, and the men of the ranks fought against each other.' The phrase Velikaya zamyatnya or "Great Troubles" features more prominently in the Nikon Chronicle, the Vologda-Perm Chronicle, the 16th-century Lvov Chronicle, the Rogozh Chronicle, and the Novgorod Fourth Chronicle (Dubrovsky manuscript).)), also known as the Golden Horde Dynastic War, was a war of succession in the Golden Horde from 1359 to 1381.

This era, which followed shortly after the Black Death had ravaged the cities of the Golden Horde, was characterised by two decades of near anarchy. A long series of short-reigning khans deposed and killed each other, only to suffer the same fate next. Mamai emerged as the most powerful Mongol warlord, frequently employing Rus' principalities such as Tver and Ryazan as his allies. Because he was not a Chingisid (descendant of Genghis Khan), Mamai had no legitimate claim to the throne, and instead used Chingisid puppet-khans to exercise political control.

The Rus' principalities and neighbouring states frequently changed their allegiancies at this time, joining forces with or against various Mongol factions and with or against each other, in tactical efforts to exploit rapidly shifting situations. The Grand Duchy of Lithuania as well as Horde vassals such as Tver and Muscovy were opportunistic in profiting from the internecine warfare that weakened Mongol-Tatar control in the region. Algirdas supported by Moldavian voivode Bogdan I defeated Mamai's forces at the Battle of Blue Waters and thereby conquered the Principality of Kiev, while Dmitry Donskoy successfully united most Rus' princes against Mamai at the 1380 Battle of Kulikovo, solidifying Muscovite pre-eminence amongst them. However, Tokhtamysh's lightning rise to power in the late 1370s, his definitive victory over Mamai (1381) and subsequent sack of Moscow (1382) confirmed the Rus' principalities' vassalage to the Golden Horde.

== Background ==
The Golden Horde had reached the height of its power and prosperity under Özbeg Khan (r. 1313–1341), when overland trade from the Black Sea to Yuan dynasty China flourished. While Özbeg adopted Islam, the Orthodox Church (exempt from taxes through yarliks or patents) continued supporting his rule, and the Turco-Mongolian population of his realm gradually assimilated and became known as "Tatars".

Taxes regularly collected by the darughachi or basqaq (baskak) from the subordinate Rus' principalities provided the Horde's coffers with plenty revenue. The responsibility of tax collection was eventually transferred from the basqaq to the Rus' princes, although it is unclear when this happened, or why, though the Golden Horde officials authorised with collecting the taxes were widely hated in Rus' sources. The last references to the basqaq system are found from the 1350s to 1382 in the Principality of Ryazan (possibly the last region to switch to princely tax collection), while emir Mamai is said to have intended to restore the basqaq system around 1380, indicating that it had fallen into disuse by then.

The khans obtained the prerogative of granting the title of Grand Prince of Vladimir to any Rus' prince they favoured through a yarlik (patent). They employed this highly symbolic title to prop up a weaker Rus' principality (usually Muscovy) against a stronger one (usually Tver) to keep the latter in check as a divide and rule policy. The Principality of Nizhny Novgorod-Suzdal also played this power game according to the Mongol rules in 1353 and 1371. In the mid-14th century, Algirdas (Olgerd) of Lithuania would try to bring Tver and Ryazan under his control during the Lithuanian–Muscovite War (1368–1372), and also played by the Mongol rules by sending a delegation to Golden Horde (as the neutral power-broker) in order to negotiate peace. But the Mongols used Moscow to counterbalance the rise of Lithuanian power; they arrested the Lithuanian envoys and handed them over to the Muscovites, so that Algirdas had to ransom his emissaries from his enemies.

Two developments in the mid-14th century were catastrophic for the Horde's society and economy: several Mongol khanates fell between 1330 and 1370, and the Black Death reached the capital city of Sarai in the 1340s, spreading to all urban centres of Golden Horde and its vassals, with many in the ranks of the khan's army and up to 25% of the Rus' population dying to the pandemic. The end of Özbeg Khan's reign in 1341 also sparked a series of dynastic regicides, first intermittently, then from 1359 with alarming frequency. Özbeg's son Tini Beg was murdered by his brother Jani Beg (1342), who in turn was possibly killed by his son Berdi Beg (1357). The latter's assassination by his brother Qulpa in 1359 is usually considered the start of the Great Troubles. When Qulpa was killed (1360) by yet another brother, Nawruz Beg, who himself died under suspicious circumstances after a year on the throne, the lineage of Batu Khan (the 1242 founder of the Golden Horde) went extinct. From 1360 to 1380, competing branches of the Jochid clan fought bitterly over the fate of the dynasty, while no fewer than 24 khans (possibly even more) were enthroned. The capital city of Sarai changed hands multiple times, in one year being successively conquered by 6 different pretenders.

== 1359–1360 ==
Khan Berdi Beg (Berdibek) was killed in 1359 in a coup by his brother Qulpa. Qulpa's two sons were Christians and bore the Slavic names Michael and Ivan, which outraged the Muslim populace of the Golden Horde. In 1360, Qulpa's brother Nawruz Beg (Navruz) revolted against the khan and killed him and his sons.

When Rus' princes heard of Berdi Beg's death, they had begun travelling to Sarai to receive patents from his successor, but by the time they arrived, Nawruz had already assumed the throne. Nawruz did not award the title of Grand Prince of Vladimir to Muscovite prince Dmitry Ivanovich (later known as "Donskoy"), but to Dmitry Konstantinovich of Suzdal, the prince of Nizhny Novgorod–Suzdal, nephew of Alexander of Suzdal who previously held it (before Ivan I "Kalita" of Moscow). Dmitry Konstantinovich was part of a group of Rus' princes who were concerned about the rise of the Daniilovichi princely dynasty of Muscovy; the princes of Rostov, Beloozero, and Galich–Dmitrov supported Konstantinovich's claim to grand prince in return for receiving extra power for themselves from Nawruz. Nawruz was overthrown in 1361, however.

By 1360, Urus Khan had set up court in Sighnaq (near modern Shieli, Kazakhstan). He was named Urus, which means "Russian" in the Turkish language, presumably because "Urus-Khan's mother was a Russian princess... he was prepared to press his claims on Russia on that ground."

== 1360s ==
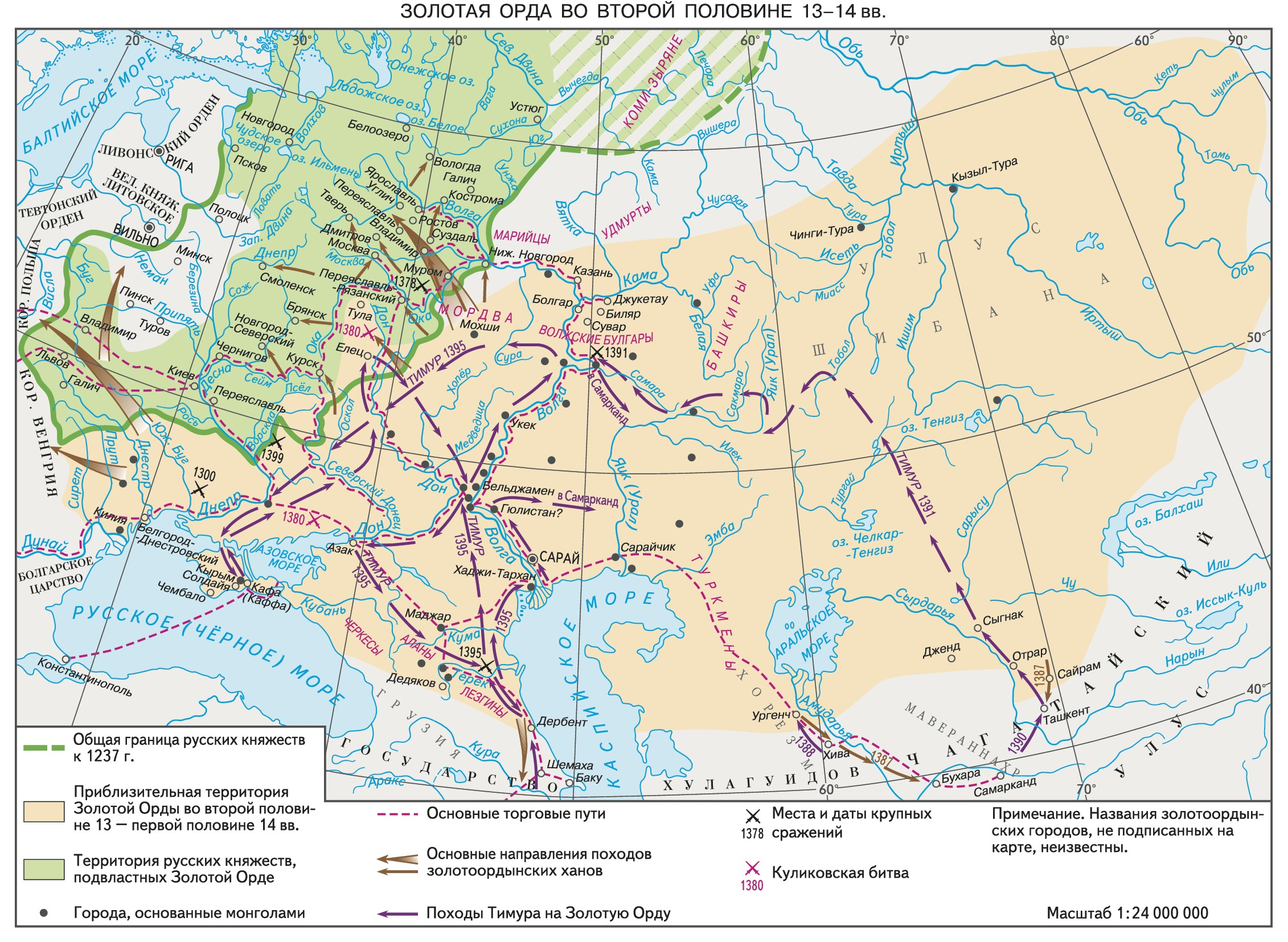
Map of the Golden Horde during the Great Troubles and Tokhtamysh–Timur war. Sarai, Sighnaq, Crimea, Bolghar and Mukhsha became strongholds of various factions during the war, while vassal Rus' principalities frequently changed sides.

In 1361, a descendant of Shiban (5th son of Jochi), was invited by some grandees to seize the throne. Khidr rebelled against Nawruz, whose own lieutenant betrayed him and handed him over to be executed. Khidr was slain by his own son, Timur Khwaja, in the same year. Timur Khwaja reigned for only five weeks before descendants of Öz Beg Khan seized power.

In 1362, the Golden Horde was divided between Keldi Beg in Sarai, Bulat Temir in Volga Bulgaria, and Abdullah in Crimea. Meanwhile, the Grand Duchy of Lithuania attacked the western tributaries of the Golden Horde and conquered Kyiv and Podolia after the Battle of Blue Waters in 1363. A powerful Mongol general by the name of Mamai backed Abdullah but failed to take Sarai, which saw the reign of two more khans, Murad and Aziz. Abdullah died in 1370 and Muhammad Bolaq was enthroned as puppet khan by Mamai.

== 1370s ==
Mamai also had to deal with a rebellion in Nizhny Novgorod. Muscovite troops impinged on the Bulgar territory of Arab-Shah, the son of Bulat Temir, who caught them off guard and defeated them on the banks of the Pyana River (1377). However Arab-Shah was unable to take advantage of the situation because of the advance of another Mongol general from the east. Mamai sent an army against the Muscovite alliance in 1378, but Dmitri Donskoy defeated Mamai's forces led by general Begich at the Battle of the Vozha River.

In 1372, Urus marched west and occupied Sarai. His nephew and lieutenant Tokhtamysh deserted him and went to Timur for assistance. Tokhtamysh attacked Urus, killing his son Kutlug-Buka, but lost the battle and fled to Samarkand. Soon after, another general Edigu deserted Urus and went over to Timur. Timur personally attacked Urus in 1376 but the campaign ended indecisively. Urus died the next year and was succeeded by his son, Timur-Melik, who immediately lost Sighnaq to Tokhtamysh. In 1378, Tokhtamysh conquered Sarai.

== 1380–1381 ==
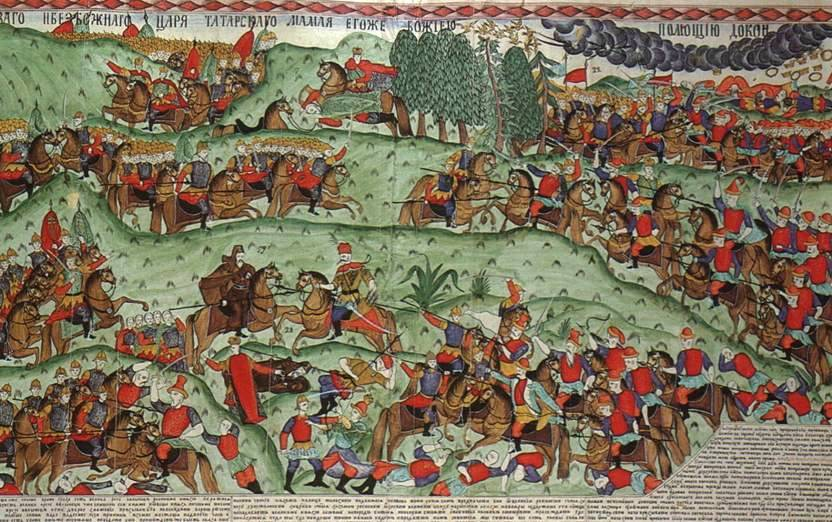
The Battle of Kulikovo. A large-scale hand-coloured lubok by I.G. Blinov (ink, tempera, gold), 1890s.

By the 1380s, the Shaybanids and Qashan attempted to break free of the Khan's power.

Mamai hired Genoese, Circassian, and Alan mercenaries for another attack on Moscow in 1380. In the ensuing battle, Mongol forces once again lost at the Battle of Kulikovo.

The Great Troubles came to an end when Tokhtamysh personally defeated Mamai the Battle of the Kalka River (1381) to become the undisputed khan of the Golden Horde.

== Aftermath: 1382 siege of Moscow ==
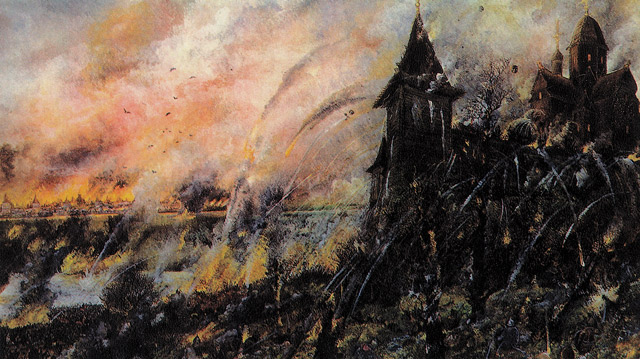
Siege of Moscow (1382) as painted by Vasily Sergeievich Smirnov (19th century)

The siege of Moscow in 1382 was motivated by khan Tokhtamysh's desire to punish Muscovy for its audacity to challenge the authority of the Golden Horde at the Battle of Kulikovo (1380). Even though it was his rival warlord Mamai who was defeated at Kulikovo, and Tokhtamysh personally defeated Mamai at the Kalka River (1381) to become the undisputed khan, he wanted to make Moscow an example of what happened if anyone dared defy Mongol supremacy over the Rus' principalities. Tokhtamysh allied himself (in part through coercion) with the Rus' princes of Tver, Riazan, and Nizhniy Novgorod against Muscovy, and launched a surprise attack on the city in 1382. Prince Dmitry Donskoy, who had led his largely Muscovite army to a pyrrhic victory at Kulikovo two years earlier, abandoned his capital and fled north, leaving the dismayed citizens of Moscow to ask a Lithuanian prince named Ostei (or Ostej), a grandson of Algirdas, to lead the defence. (Note: "With more common sense than valour, Dmitrii Donskoi withdrew northward, leaving the people of his capital to their fate. In their consternation, they turned to a Lithuanian prince, Ostei, to lead the defence of the city.") The princes of Nizhniy Novgorod tricked the population into surrendering the city, after which Tokhtamysh' forces immediately sacked Moscow as punishment for resisting Mongol authority.

Although Kulikovo had marked Muscovy's new position as the pre-eminent state amongst the Rus' principalities, the subsequent sack of Moscow confirmed that Donskoy and the other princes remained firmly under suzerainty of the Tatar–Mongol Golden Horde, now ruled by Tokhtamysh. According to Charles J. Halperin Halperin (1987), 'Moscow benefited more from the deteriorating relations between Tokhtamysh [and] Tamerlane (Timur) than it had from the victory of Kulikovo.' The Tokhtamysh–Timur war (1386–1395) and the 1399 Battle of the Vorskla River established Timurid control over the Golden Horde and its Rus' vassals, but because Muscovy mostly escaped the destruction of war, these years allowed it to recover and grow its strength.

Halperin (2016) described the Juchid ulus (Golden Horde) as having evolved from "the thirteenth to early fourteenth century major European and Asian power" to a "late fourteenth-century minor regional East European [power]" during the decades-long war. Tokhtamysh was not as bloodthirsty as Genghis Khan, and did not have the means to completely level Moscow (as Genghis would have done), just like Özbeg Khan had not wiped Tver from the face of the earth after crushing the Tver Uprising of 1327.

== List of events ==
- 1359: Khan Berdi Beg killed by Qulpa, who seizes the Golden Horde throne – Great Troubles begin
- February 1360: Nowruz Beg overthrows Qulpa
- June 1360: Khiḍr Khan overthrows Nowruz Beg
- 1360: Urus Khan sets up court in Sighnaq
- 1360/1: Rus' princes travelling to Sarai are abused and their property is stolen. Subsequently they stopped personally travelling to Sarai, and instead sent emissaries to pay homage and receive patents.
- August 1361: Timur Khwaja overthrows Khiḍr Khan
- August/September 1361: Ordu Malik overthrows Timur Khwaja
- September/October 1361: warlord Mamai and Mukhsha governor Tagai conquer the capital Sarai, overthrow Ordu Malik and enthrone Kildi Beg
- late 1361: Mamai returns to his base in Crimea and proclaims Abdallāh the new khan
- September/August 1362: Battle on the Volga River – Khiḍr Khan's brother Murād (in control of Gülistan) defeats and kills Kildi Beg
- September 1362: Mamai briefly installs Abdallāh at Sarai, but they are defeated in battle by Murād

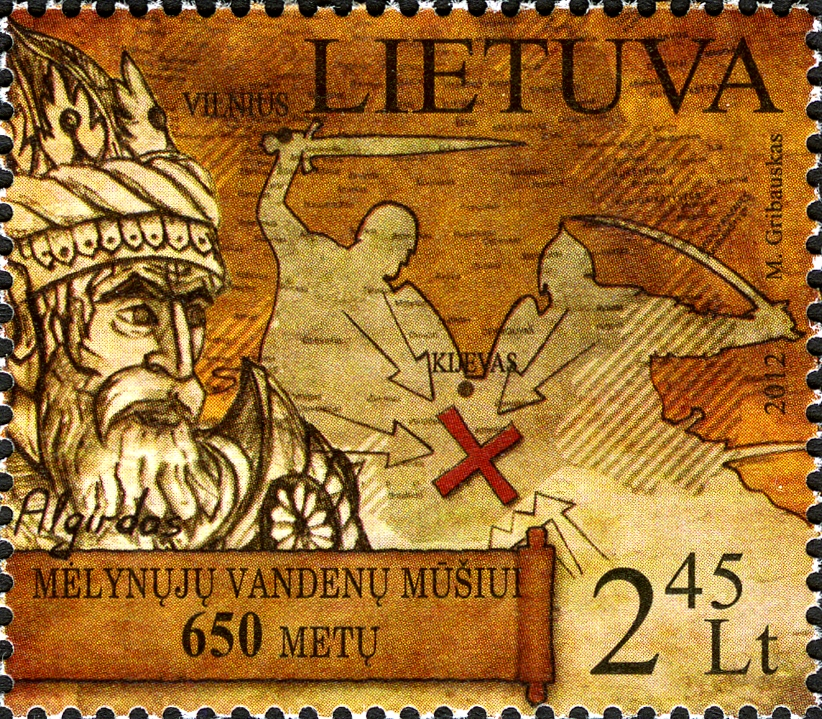
2012 commemorative stamp for the Battle of Blue Waters issued in Lithuania

- Autumn 1362 or 1363: Battle of Blue Waters – battle of Lithuania and Moldavian allies against Abdallāh's Golden Horde forces. Lithuania is victorious and incorporates the Principality of Kiev.
- late 1362: Khayr Pulad conquers Sarai and drives out Murād or Abdallāh
- winter 1362–3: Muscovite troops of Dmitry Donskoy drive out Nizhny Novgorod–Suzdalian troops of Dmitry Konstantinovich from the city of Vladimir–on-Klyazma on the authority of a patent from a khan at Sarai.
- early 1363: Mamai issues a patent awarding the title of grand prince of Vladimir to Dmitry Donskoy of Muscovy. Donskoy had thus received two patents (yarliks) for the throne of Vladimir from rival khans. The khan at Sarai changes allegiance and issues a patent awarding the title of grand prince of Vladimir to Dmitry Konstantinovich of Nizhny Novgorod–Suzdal.
- 1363: Dmitry Konstantinovich of Nizhny Novgorod–Suzdal fails to retake city of Vladimir, and is driven back to Suzdal by Mamai and Dmitry Donskoy of Muscovy.
- 1363/4: Donskoy evicts sitting princes from Starodub, Galich and Rostov, and replaces them with vassals by invoking his title of grand prince of Vladimir with Mamai's backing.
- 1363: Mamai attacks Murād at Gülistan
- 1363/4: Khayr Pulad tries to take control of Crimea, but is driven out by Mamai
- 1364: Dmitry Konstantinovich of Nizhny Novgorod–Suzdal and Dmitry Donskoy of Muscovy conclude a peace agreement and recognise the latter as grand prince of Vladimir. Later in 1364, Konstantinovich refuses a patent from yet another khan for the title of Vladimir.
- Autumn 1364: Aziz Shaykh seizes Sarai (probably from Khayr Pulad) and proclaims himself khan

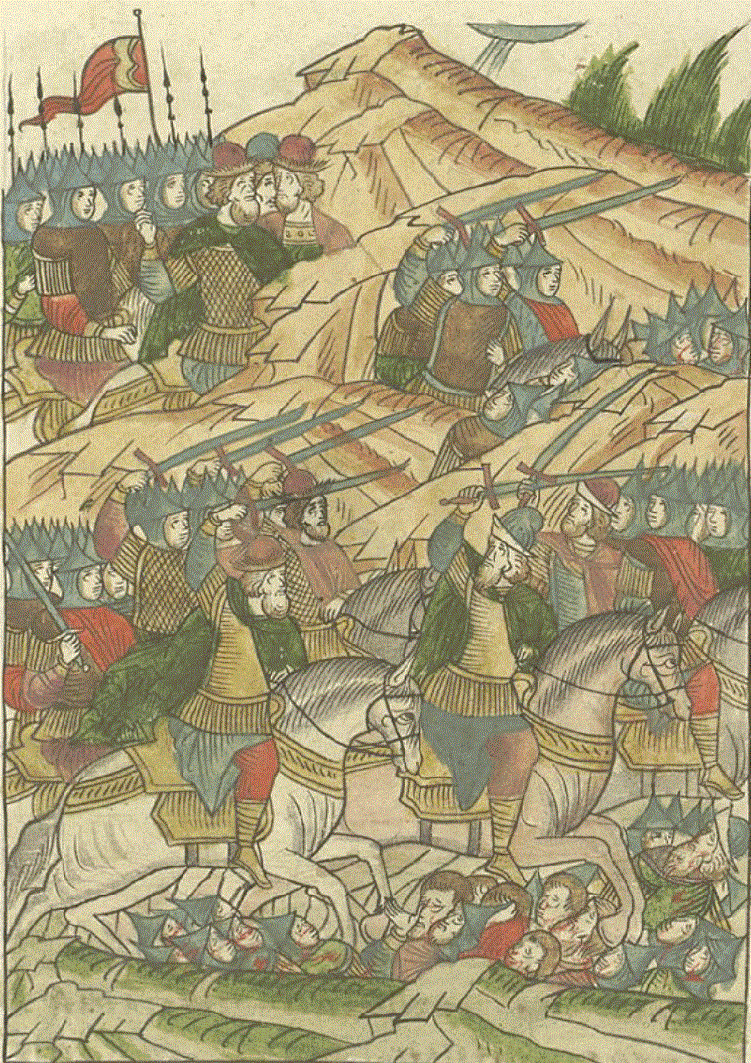
Illustration from the 16th-century Facial Chronicle about the Battle near the Shishevsky Forest

- 1365: Battle near the Shishevsky Forest – forces of Ryazan and Kozelsk defeat the Golden Horde forces of Mukhsha governor Tagai
- 1367: Battle of the Pyana River (1367) – Bulat-Timur, the autonomous emir of the (Volga) Bulgar Ulus (Qashan Principality), was defeated by troops from the Principality of Nizhny Novgorod-Suzdal
- 1367: Khan Aziz Shaykh defeats Bulat-Timur and reincorporates the Bulgar Ulus into the Golden Horde
- 1368: Mamai defeats Mukhsha governor Tagai
- 1368/9: Urus Khan seizes the throne of the Ulus of Orda from Qutluq Khwaja, makes himself khan, and purges princes and emirs whom he suspects of disloyalty.
- 1368–1372: Lithuanian–Muscovite War (1368–1372) – Algirdas of Lithuania and Mikhail II of Tver (obtaining several yarliks from khans for the title of grand prince of Vladimir) raid and attack Moscow, defeating the Muscovites in the Battle of the Trosna River (21 November 1368). But they fail to conquer the city itself on three occasions (1368, 1370; 1372 didn't reach Moscow). The recently completed Moscow Kremlin Wall proved insurmountable.
  - December 1371: Battle of Skornishchevo – Muscovites defeat prince Oleg II of Ryazan.
- Summer 1372: Treaty of Lyubutsk – Lithuania and Muscovy conclude peace.
- 1373: Urus Khan drives Mamai's protégé Muḥammad-Sulṭān out of Sarai and briefly controls the capital.
- 1374: Mamai briefly recaptures Sarai, then Urus Khan recaptures Sarai.
- 1374: Mamai sends Sary-Aka's embassy to Nizhny Novgorod.
- 1375: Qaghan Beg captures Sarai from Urus Khan.
- 1375: Muscovy–led expedition against Tver (allied with Mamai, who had given Tver the yarlik of the Vladimir throne). Treaty imposed on Tver, recognising itself as a "younger brother" of Moscow.
- 137?: Tokhtamysh receives aid from Timur (Tamerlane) and establishes himself at Otrar and Sayram. Urus' son Qutlu-Buqa defeated Tokhtamysh, but died of wounds from the battle.
- 137?: Tokhtamysh attacked Urus Khan with fresh troops from Timur, but is defeated (and wounded) by Urus' son Toqtaqiya in a battle near the river Syr Darya.
- 1376: Skirmishes between the forces of Timur (supporting Tokhtamysh) and Urus Khan end indecisively. Urus dies.
- 1376: Muscovite–Volga Bulgars war (1376) – war between Muscovy and Nizhny Novgorod-Suzdal against the Bulgar Ulus (Qashan Principality, under Mamai's control). Moscow briefly installed a tax collector in Bolghar until the city was taken back by the Tatars.
- 1377: 2 August [O.S. 21 July] Battle on Pyana River – Arab Shah, or Mamai, defeated a Rus' princes coalition led by Nizhny Novgorod-Suzdalian nobleman Ivan Dmitriyevich (killed in battle; son of prince Dmitri Konstantinovich of Suzdal), also including Pereyaslavl, Yaroslavl, Yuryev, Murom.
- 1377: After Pyana, Mongol troops loyal to Mamai sacked and burnt the city of Nizhny Novgorod.
- 1377: Arab Shah's Mongol troops raided and plundered the countryside of Nizhny Novgorod and Ryazan, capturing the city (and prince) of Ryazan itself in autumn 1377.
- Autumn 1377: Arab Shah forces Qāghān Beg to abdicate, and becomes the new khan at Sarai.
- 1377: On Arab Shah's orders, Dmitrij Ivanovič of Moscow and Dmitrij Konstantinovič of Nižnij Novgorod attacked the Mordvins (allies of Mamai) and forced them to recognise Arab Shah's suzerainty.
- 1378: Arab Shah attacked Mamai's vassal Tagai, beg of Mukhsha (modern Narovchat), killed him, and subjugated the area. According to Rus' chronicles, Tagai had already been killed in the late 1360s.
- 1378: Arab Shah turned on his Rus' vassal Dmitrij Konstantinovič, and captured and sacked Nižnij Novgorod (which had already been burnt down by Mamai the previous year), arresting and torturing Rus' merchants and confiscating their goods.
- 1378: Arab Shah plundered Ryazan (again).
- 11 August 1378: Battle of the Vozha River – Muscovy defeats Mamai's general Begich
- 1378: Tokhtamysh conquers Sarai. Arab Shah eventually abdicated in 1380 in favour of Tokhtamysh, who spared him and Qaghan Beg, and gave them some fiefdoms to reign.
- 1378/9: Tokhtamysh defeats and kills Urus' son Temur-Malik
- 1380: Battle of Kulikovo – coalition of Rus' princes led by Dmitry Donskoy of Muscovy defeat Mamai's faction
- 1381: Battle of the Kalka River (1381) – Tokhtamysh's faction defeats Mamai's faction, becomes undisputed khan of the Golden Horde and ends Great Troubles
- (Aftermath) 1382: Siege of Moscow (1382) – Tokhtamysh's Golden Horde and Nizhny Novgorod-Suzdal besiege and devastate Moscow while Dmitry Donskoy flees.

== See also ==
- Armies of the Rus' principalities
- List of khans of the Golden Horde
- List of wars involving the Principality of Moscow
- List of wars of succession in Europe
- Galicia–Volhynia Wars (1340–1392)
- Muscovite–Lithuanian Wars
  - Lithuanian–Muscovite War (1368–1372)
- Tokhtamysh–Timur war (1386–1395)

== Bibliography ==
- Atwood, Christopher Pratt (2004). Encyclopedia of Mongolia and the Mongol Empire. Facts On File. ISBN 978-0-8160-4671-3.
- Crummey, Robert O. (2014). The Formation of Muscovy 1300 – 1613. Routledge. pp. 52–62. ISBN 9781317872009. (originally published in 1987).
- Grekov, B. D.; Jakubovskij, A. J. (1950). Zolotaja orda i eë padenie. Moscow.
- Grigor'ev, A. P. (1983). "Zolotoordynskie hany 60-70-h godov XIV v.: hronologija pravlenii". Istriografija i istočnikovedenie stran Azii i Afriki. 7: 9–54.
- Halperin, Charles J. (1987). Russia and the Golden Horde: The Mongol Impact on Medieval Russian History. Indiana University. p. 222. ISBN 9781850430575. (e-book).
- Halperin, Charles J. (17 February 2016). "A Tatar interpretation of the battle of Kulikovo Field, 1380: Rustam Nabiev". Nationalities Papers. 44 (1): 4–19. doi:10.1080/00905992.2015.1063594. ISSN 0090-5992. S2CID 129150302.
- Howorth, H. H. (1880). History of the Mongols from the 9th to the 19th Century Part II.1. London.
- Kohn, George Childs (2013). Dictionary of Wars. Revised Edition. Londen/New York: Routledge. ISBN 9781135954949.
- Martin, Janet (1995). Medieval Russia: 980–1584. New York: Cambridge University Press. ISBN 0521362768.
  - Martin, Janet (2004). Medieval Russia: 980–1584. Cambridge: Cambridge University Press. ISBN 9780521368322. Archived from the original on 23 April 2023. (digital printing 2004)
  - Martin, Janet (2007). Medieval Russia: 980–1584. Second Edition. E-book. Cambridge: Cambridge University Press. ISBN 978-0-511-36800-4.
- Nasonov, A. N. (1940). Mongoly i Rus. Moscow.
- Počekaev, Roman Julianovich (2010a). Цари ордынские: биографии ханов и правителей Золотой Орды (Cari ordynskie: Biografii hanov i pravitelej Zolotoj Ordy) [Tsars of the Horde: Biographies of the Khans and Rulers of the Golden Horde]. Saint Petersburg: Eurasia. p. 406. ISBN 9785918520109.
- Počekaev, Roman Julianovich (2010b). Мамай: история "антигероя" в истории (Mamaj: Istorija "anti-geroja" v istorii) [Mamai: the story of an 'anti-hero' in history]. Saint Petersburg: Eurasia. p. 287. ISBN 9785918520208.
- Pokhlebkin, William (1992). A History of Vodka. Verso. ISBN 0-86091-359-7.
- Safargaliev, M. G. (1960). Raspad Zolotoj Ordy. Saransk.
- Sagdeeva, R. Z. (2005). Serebrjannye monety hanov Zolotoj Ordy. Moscow.
- Seleznëv, J. V. (2009). Èlita Zolotoj Ordy. Kazan.
- Shaikhutdinov, Marat (23 November 2021). "3.4 Invasion of Tokhtamysh". Between East and West: The Formation of the Moscow State. Academic Studies Press. pp. 104–107. ISBN 9781644697153.
- Sidorenko, V. A. (2000). "Hronologija pravlenii zolotoordynskih hanov 1357-1380 gg". Materialov po arheologii, istorii i ètnografii Tavrii. Vol. 7. pp. 267–288.
- Vernadsky, George (1953), The Mongols and Russia, Yale University Press
- Sorogin, Yevgeniy Igorevich (2022). "Начальный период "великой замятни" в русских летописях" [The initial period of the "Great Troubles" in Rus' chronicles]. Bulletin of the South Ural State University (in Russian). 22 (2). South Ural State University: 35–41. doi:10.14529/ssh220205 (inactive 12 July 2025).
- Gonta, Alexandru I. (2010). Românii și Hoarda de Aur 1241-1502 [Romanians and the Golden Horde 1241-1502] (in Romanian). Iași: Casa Editorială Demiurg. ISBN 9731522042.
