= Togay =

Togay [ˈtogai], pronounced (Toe-guy), is a Turkish male given name and surname meaning "full moon" or "rising moon". Notable people with the name include:

Surname:

- Can Togay, Hungarian film director
- Erol Togay, Turkish footballer
- Nuri Togay, 16th President of Beşiktaş J.K.

Given Name:

- Togay Bey, Crimean Tatar military leader
- Togay-Timur, grandson of Genghis Khan
- Kara Şaman Togay, Mongolian Warlord from Kuruluş: Osman

== See also ==
- Tuğay
- Tugay
