= Narovchat, Narovchatsky District, Penza Oblast =

Rural locality in Penza Oblast, Russia

Coordinates: 53°52′48″N 43°41′49″E

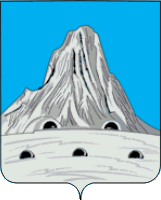
Coat of Arms of Narovchat

Narovchat (Russian: Наровча́т, Moksha: Норзяд) is a rural locality (a selo) and the administrative center of Narovchatsky District, Penza Oblast, Russia. Population: 4,199 (2010 census); 4,398 (2002 census); 4,378 (1989 Soviet census).

== Notable residents ==
- Mikhail Frinovsky (1898–1940), deputy head of the NKVD in the years of the Great Purge
- Aleksandr Kuprin (1870–1938), writer of novels

== See also ==
Mukhsha

=== Sources ===
- Законодательное Собрание Пензенской области. Закон №774-ЗПО от 9 марта 2005 г. «Об административно-территориальном устройстве Пензенской области», в ред. Закона №2484-ЗПО от 28 ноября 2013 г. «О внесении изменений в статью 15 Закона Пензенской области "Об административно-территориальном устройстве Пензенской области"». Вступил в силу через десять дней после дня официального опубликования. Опубликован: "Пензенские губернские ведомости", №6, стр. 49, 18 марта 2005 г. (Legislative Assembly of Penza Oblast. Law #774-ZPO of March 9, 2005 On the Administrative-Territorial Structure of Penza Oblast, as amended by the Law #2484-ZPO of November 28, 2013 On Amending Article 15 of the Law of Penza Oblast "On the Administrative-Territorial Structure of Penza Oblast". Effective as of the day ten days after the day of the official publication.).
- Законодательное Собрание Пензенской области. Закон №690-ЗПО от 2 ноября 2004 г. «О границах муниципальных образований Пензенской области», в ред. Закона №2681-ЗПО от 4 марта 2015 г. «О внесении изменений в Закон Пензенской области "О границах муниципальных образований Пензенской области"». Вступил в силу через 10 дней после официального опубликования. Опубликован: "Пензенские губернские ведомости", №17 (без приложения), 16 ноября 2004 г. (Legislative Assembly of Penza Oblast. Law #690-ZPO of November 2, 2004 On the Borders of the Municipal Formations of Penza Oblast, as amended by the Law #2681-ZPO of March 4, 2015 On Amending the Law of Penza Oblast "On the Borders of the Municipal Formations of Penza Oblast". Effective as of after 10 days from the official publication.).
