= Mukhsha =

Archaeological site in Russia

Muxşi, Muxşa
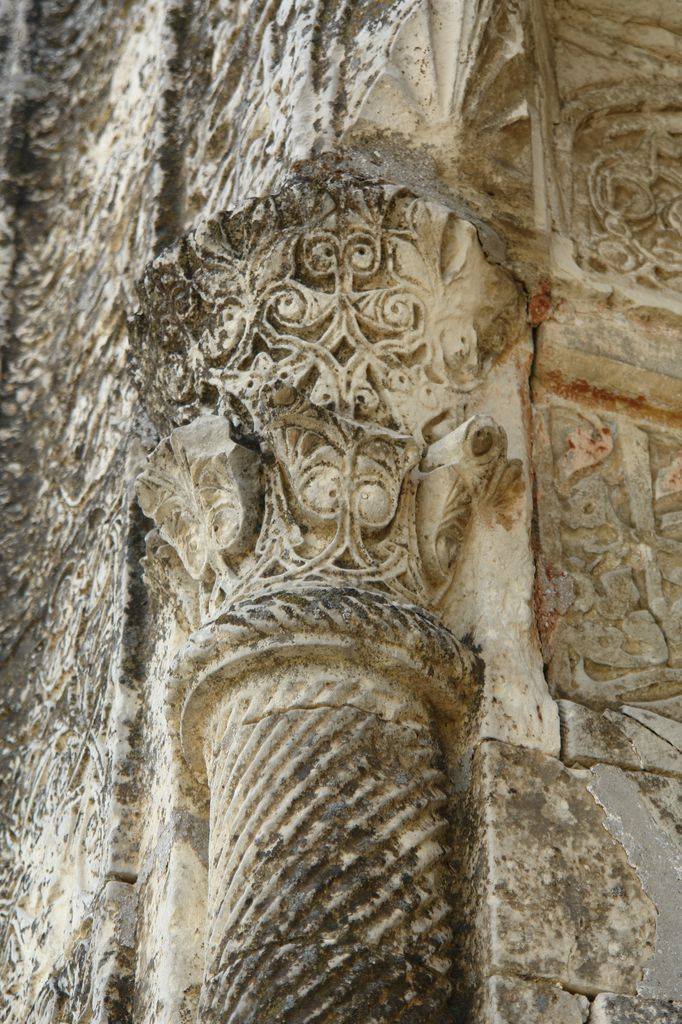
- Сolumn chapiter of Özbeg Khan reign period

- Location of the site within Russia Mukhsha (European Russia)
- 53.8493°N 43.7374°E
- Type: city
- Periods: Medieval
- Cultures: Saltovo-Mayaki
- Satellite of: Golden Horde
- Associated with: Mongols
- Location: Penza Oblast, Russia
- Region: Mukhsha Ulus

History
- Abandoned: 1600s
- Event: Mongol Takeover in 1237, Destruction by Timur in 1395

Site notes
- Length: 2000
- Width: 900
- Excavation dates: 1923–1927
- Archaeologists: Aleksandr Krotkov
- Condition: In ruins

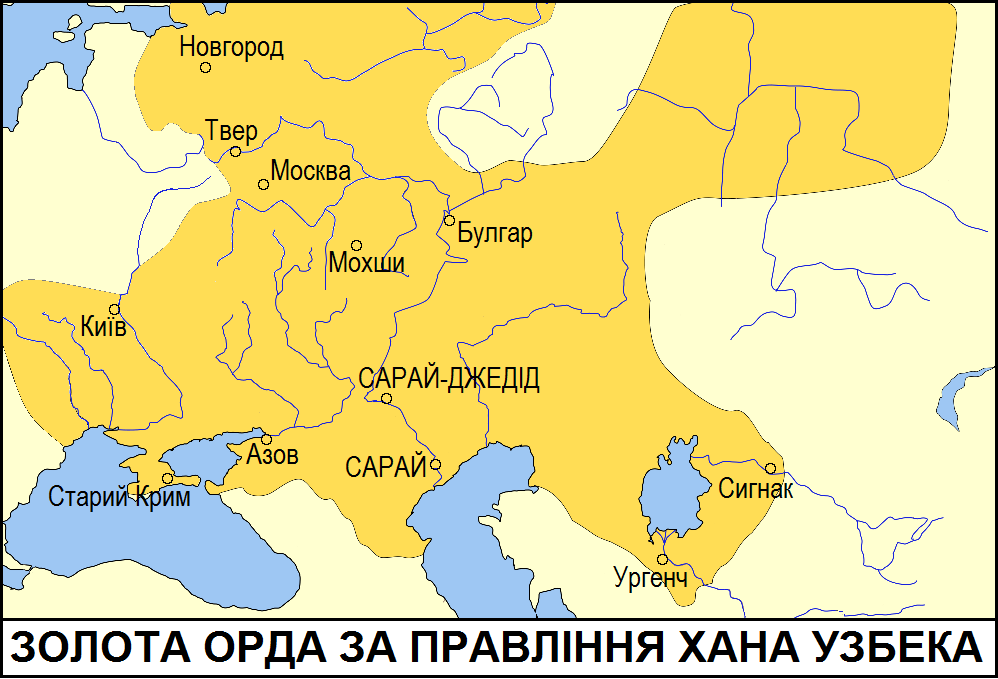
City of Mukhsha in the middle of the Golden Horde

Mukhshi (Tatar: Muxşa, Mukhsha) was the administrative center of Mukhsha Ulus and one of the Golden Horde centres of coinage. In the 15th century the city lost its importance and declined. The ruins (buildings of bricks, stone baths, Muslim graves) are situated in Penza Oblast near the modern town of Narovchat in the upper stream of Moksha River.

== History ==
=== Foundation and name ===
The city foundation date is unknown. The archeological findings confirmed the first city population was Moksha. The city is often referred to as Mukhsha or Mukhshi which in fact was the name of the ulus Mukhsha, the official city name used in the Mongol period was Nurinjat . (Note: Turki ﻥﺭﻥﺝﺍﻁ, Nurinjat IPA [nurinˈdʒɑt])

=== Mukhsha Ulus ===
Mukhsha became the administrative center of Mukhsha Ulus and residence of Öz Beg Khan in 1313–1342. In 1313–1367 the city minted dangs, dirhams and pūls. Destroyed by Timur in 1395. In 16th century in Nurindzhat attested private and public baths, running water, sewerage, underfloor heating. The streets were paved with stones, there were fountains with drinking water, cathedral mosque, tavern (teahouse), inns, caravanserai, palace, houses and mausoleums of stone, Muslim cemetery. There were 3 potteries with ancient forges and a brick factory. Every brick made in Mukhshi had a special tamga. There was an artisan quarter with numerous workshops. Residential quarters partly lay nowadays under the rural locality Narovchat. Northwest of Narovchat lays another gravefield (old cemetery), divided into Muslim ( (Note: Russian: Мизгитное поле, romanized: Mizgtnoye field, lit. 'Mosque field') named so by later Russian population due to round foundations of mausoluems ruins) and presumably "Pagan" areas. 4 mausoleums and probably a mosque and a minaret ruins were found in the "Mosque field" The Medieval city ruins were discovered by Russian archeologist Aleksandr Krotkov in 1915.

=== Volga Trade Route ===
In 14th century, Mukhshi played an important role on trade route from Don to Black sea (Principality of Theodoro and Genoese Gazaria colonies in Crimea)

== Literature ==
- Making Mongol History: Rashid al-Din and the Jamiʿ al-Tawarikh (Edinburgh Studies in Classical Islamic History and Culture) by Stefan Kamola, Edinburgh University Press; 1st edition (14 August 2019), ISBN 978-1474421423
- Golubev O.V. Mokhshi Coinage. Penza, 2020
- "Muxşa". Tatar Encyclopaedia (in Tatar). Kazan: The Republic of Tatarstan Academy of Sciences. Institution of the Tatar Encyclopaedia. 2002.

=== Sources ===
- Krotkov, Aleksandr (1923), In Search Of Mukhshi. Saratov University History, Archeology and Ethnography Society (in Russian), Saratov
- Lebedev, Vitaly (1957), Mysterious City Mokhshi (in Russian), Penza
- Lebedev, Vitaly (1958), Excavations Description. Archeologist Vitaly Lebedev's works (in Russian), Penza
- Ikonnikov, Dmitry; Baisheva, Marina (2018), "Golden Horde City Mokhshi Topography in 13–14th Centuries", Вестник Пензенского Государственного Университета (in Russian), 1 (21), Penza State University Review: 82–90
- Madurov, Dmitry (2012), "Great City" Localization In The Light Of 1184 Events Reconstruction. Statehood Of East Bulghars between 9th and 13th centuries (in Russian), Cheboksary: Taus
- Abp. of Don and Novocherkassk, Makarīĭ (1857), Monuments Of Church Antiquities. Nizhny Novgorod Governorate (in Russian), Sankt Peterburg: Synodal Typography
- Ikonnikov, Dmitry; Karev, Igor; Baisheva, Maria (2019), "Narovchat Settlement in 14th Century: Historiography Review", Вестник Пензенского Государственного Университета (in Russian), 1 (25), Penza: Penza State University: 12–19
