= Nowruz Beg =

Safavid official (died 1640)

Nowruz Beg (died 1640), was a Safavid official from the Georgian Tulashvili clan, who served during the reigns of Abbas I (1588-1629) and Safi (1629-1642). He married a daughter of the prominent Safavid-Georgian military and political leader Imam-Quli Khan. In 1626-1627, Abbas I made Nowruz Beg steward of the Javanshir clan in Karabakh, while his brother-in-law Daud Khan Undiladze became governor of Karabakh itself.

== Sources ==
- Maeda, Hirotake (2003). "On the Ethno-Social Background of Four Gholām Families from Georgia in Safavid Iran". Studia Iranica (32): 272.
- Maeda, Hirotake (2006). "The forced migrations and reorganisation of the regional order in the Caucasus by Safavid Iran: Preconditions and developments described by Fazli Khuzani". In Ieda, Osamu; Uyama, Tomohiko (eds.). Reconstruction and interaction of Slavic Eurasia and its neighbouring worlds (PDF). Slavic Eurasian Studies, No.10. Sapporo: Slavic Research Centre, Hokkaido University. pp. 245, 260–261. ISBN 4938637391.
