= 1480 Sarai raid =

Campaign against the Great Horde

- Part of the Great Stand on the Ugra River
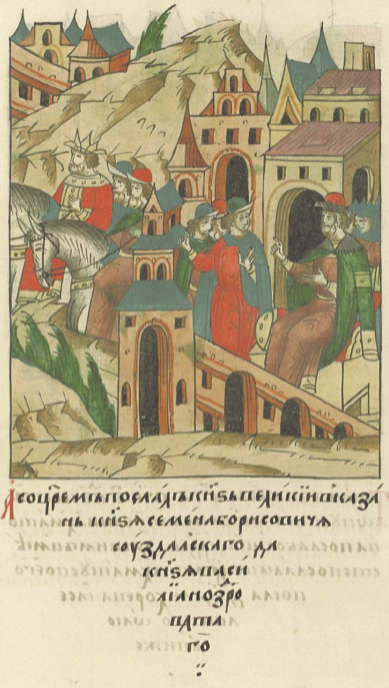
- Vasili Nozdorovaty in the Illustrated Chronicle of Ivan the Terrible (16th century)
Date	November 1480
Location	New Sarai
Result	Russo-Crimean victory
Territorial changes	The destruction of the Sarai and the capture of huge prey, the weakening of the Mongolian standing on the Ugra; Decline of Great Horde

Belligerents
Crimean Khanate; Grand Duchy of Moscow	Great Horde

Commanders and leaders
Vasili Nozdorovaty-Zvenigorodsky; Nur Devlet	N/O

Casualties and losses
None	Almost the entire population

The Sarai raid in 1480 was a joint campaign of a small Russian-Crimean detachment against the capital of the Great Horde. The campaign was caused by the fact that Akhmat Khan mobilized all his forces and sent them to Ugra, leaving the capital defenseless. The destruction of Sarai was the main reason for Akhmat's departure from Ugra.

The Russians could have completely destroyed this city, but the Crimean khan asked them not to do this, and the Russians left with a large amount of loot, the khan's wives and Lithuanian politicians.

== Bibliography ==
- Terentyev, M. (2022). История завоевания Средней Азии [The history of the conquest of Central Asia] (in Russian). Volume 1. ISBN 978-5-4481-1327-7.
- Gumilev, Lev (2023) [1992]. От Руси к России [For Rus' to Russia]. Эксклюзивная классика (revised ed.). Moscow: AST. ISBN 978-5-17-153845-3.
- Karamzin, Nikolay (2020) [1824]. История Государства Российского [History of the Russian state]. Азбука. ISBN 978-5-4484-4482-1.
