= Tuğay =

- Municipality
- Location within Azerbaijan
- Coordinates: 41°09′12″N 49°07′57″E
- Country: Azerbaijan
- Rayon: Siazan

Population
  - Total: 374
- Time zone: UTC+4 (AZT)
  - Summer (DST): UTC+5 (AZT)

Tuğay (also, Tağay, Tagai, Tagay, Tagiya, and Toğay) is a village and municipality in the Siazan Rayon of Azerbaijan. It has a population of 374.
