= Principality of Tver =

Russian principality (1246–1485)

Coordinates: 57°00′N 36°00′E

Principality of Tver Тверское княжество
- 1246–1485
- Seal

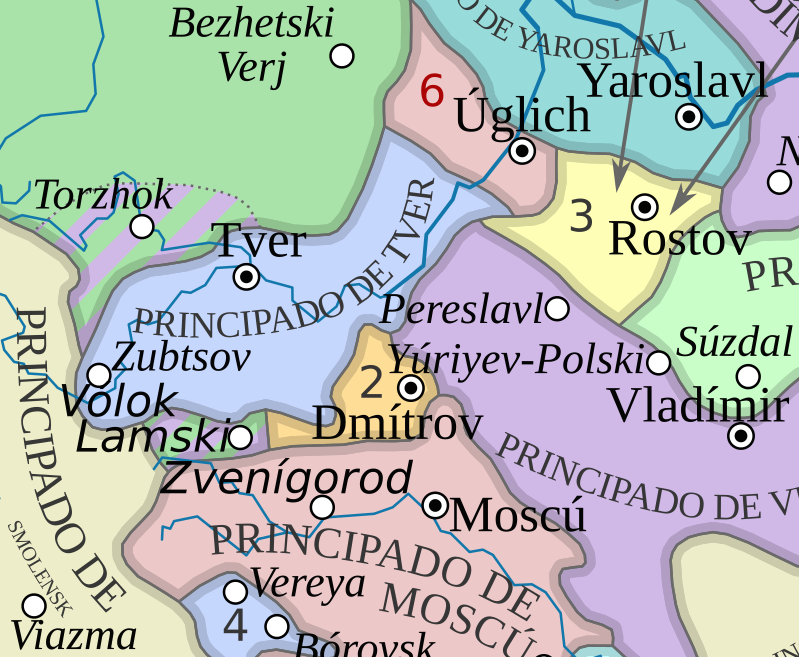
- Principality of Tver in the 14th century, during the Great Troubles
- Status: Principality
- Capital: Tver
- Common languages: Russian
- Religion: Russian Orthodoxy
- Government: Feudal monarchy
- Prince
  - 1247–1271: Yaroslav
  - 1461–1485: Mikhail III
- History
  - Established: 1246
  - Annexation: 1485

Area
  - Total: 28,450 km^{2} (10,980 sq mi)
Preceded by	Succeeded by
Vladimir-Suzdal	Grand Principality of Moscow

The Principality of Tver (Russian: Тверское княжество, romanized: Tverskoye knyazhestvo) was a Russian principality which existed between the 13th and the 15th centuries with its capital in Tver. (Note: Also spelt Tver', Russian: Тверь, romanized: Tver', Church Slavonic: Тферь, romanized: Tfer'. English adjective and demonym: Tverian or Tverite.) The principality was located approximately in the area currently occupied by Tver Oblast and the eastern part of Smolensk Oblast.

It was one of the states established after the fall of Kievan Rus'. Originally part of the Pereyaslavl-Zalessky principality, Tver became an independent principality when Yaroslav Yaroslavich was given the western slice of his father's patrimony. During the 14th century, Tver rivaled the Principality of Moscow with the aim to become the center of the unified Russian state. Eventually it lost, decayed, and in 1485, it was annexed by Moscow.

== History ==
=== Origins ===
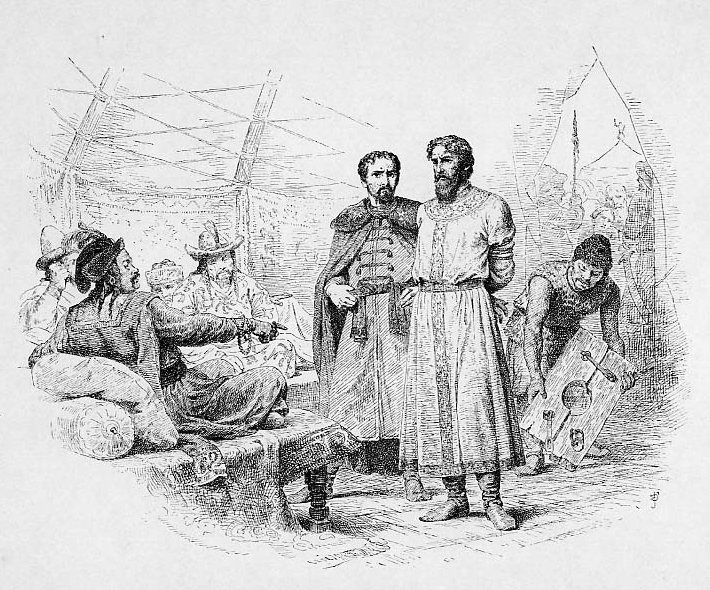
Execution of Mikhail at the Golden Horde, by Vasily Vereshchagin.

In the 1230s or the 1240s, Yaroslav Vsevolodovich, the grand prince of Vladimir, detached the city of Tver from the Pereyaslavl-Zalessky principality (where it previously belonged), and gave it to his son Alexander "Nevsky" Yaroslavich. In 1246, another son of Yaroslav, Yaroslav Yaroslavich, became the first prince of Tver, and the principality was ruled by his descendants until 1485, when it was abolished.

The Mongol invasion of Kievan Rus' (1237–1241) and subsequent Mongol raids for about 25 years devastated many cities, towns and their countryside in northeastern Rus', such as Vladimir on the Klyazma and Ryazan. Depopulation was less severe in the regions around Tver, Moscow, and Yaroslavl, which sometimes received refugees from more war-torn areas. In particular, Tver and Moscow received many displaced inhabitants of Vladimir, and experienced population growth during the early Golden Horde hegemony. After the 1264 death of Alexander "Nevsky" Yaroslavich, his brothers Yaroslav Yaroslavich of Tver and Andrey Yaroslavich got into a succession struggle over the title of grand prince of Vladimir. As the first khan of the Golden Horde, Batu, had done twice before in 1249 and 1252, his brother Berke Khan settled the dispute and with a jarlig (patent) confirmed Yaroslav of Tver as the next Vladimirian grand prince.

A bishopric was founded during the reign of Yaroslav, sometime before his death in 1271. No other important events are known to have occurred in the principality during the reigns of Yaroslav and his son Sviatoslav, who died in the first half of the 1280s. Nevertheless, Tver had an advantageous location on the Upper Volga for luxury goods transported by traders from the far north down the river towards the Jochid capital of Sarai. It was one of the first northeastern Rus' cities to begin post-invasion major construction works, such as the Transfiguration Church (Russian: Спасо-Преображенский собор) in the late 13th century.

=== Emergence and decline as a great power ===
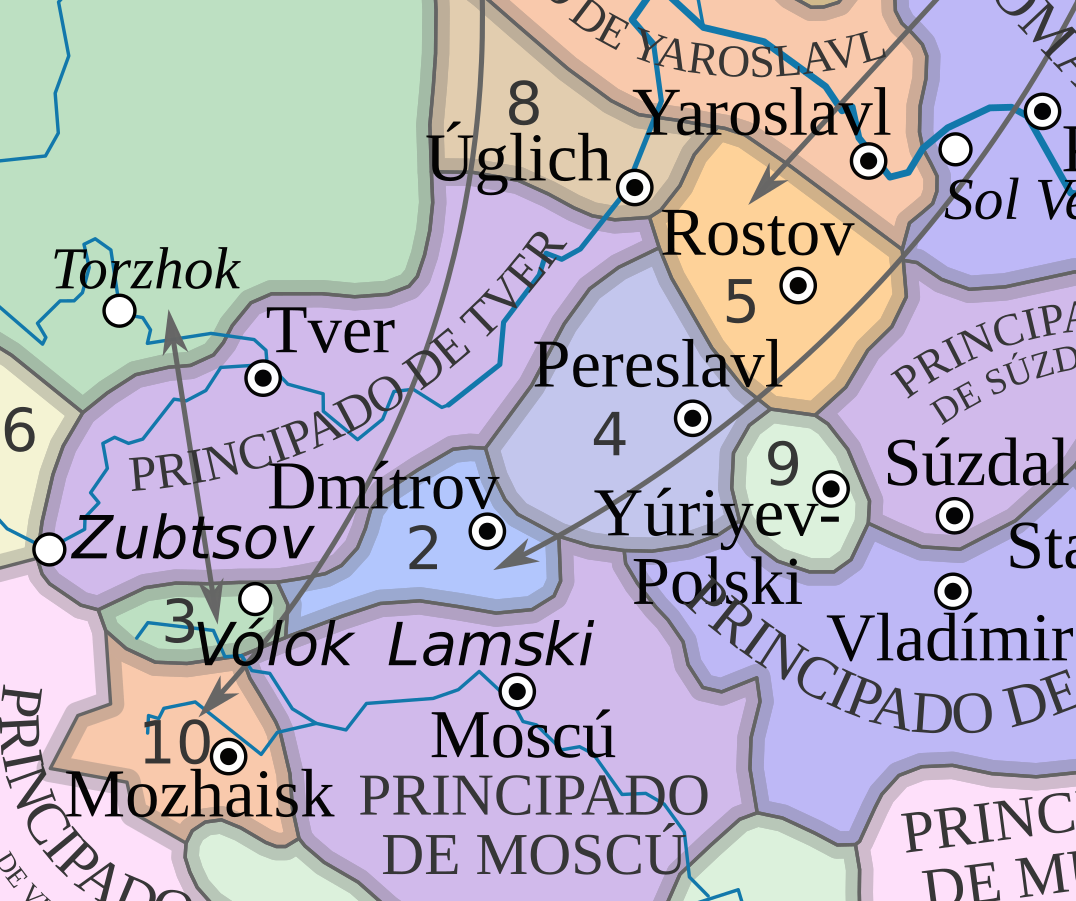
Principality of Tver in the 13th century, after the fragmentation of Vladimir-Suzdal

In 1285, Mikhail of Tver, a son of Yaroslav of Tver, succeeded his father and became the prince of Tver. In 1305 he became the grand prince of Vladimir as well; however, Özbeg Khan of the Golden Horde decided that Tver became too strong, and supported Moscow against Tver. This led to a military campaign led by Yuri Danilovich of Moscow against Mikhail, supported by Özbeg in 1317. Mikhail met Yuri's army at a small village called Bortenevo, where he was victorious. In the same encounter, Özbeg's sister and Yuri's wife, Konchaka, was captured by Mikhail and made a prisoner of war. Konchaka later died in captivity in Tver, where Yuri was able to blame Mikhail for the death of the khan's sister. Mikhail was summoned to the Golden Horde and tried there in 1318, where he faced a month of imprisonment and torture before being executed. His son and successor, Dmitry, was executed in the Golden Horde in 1326, and another son and also a prince of Tver, Aleksandr Mikhailovich, was executed there in 1339 as well together with his son Fyodor.

In 1327, an anti-Tatar uprising in Tver was suppressed. The city of Tver was burned down, and the principality lost a considerable part of its population. Tver never recovered, and Ivan I of Moscow was later granted the title of grand prince of Vladimir, in which Moscow became the preeminent Russian principality. Moscow remained on good terms with the Tatars, and absorbed surrounding principalities. The head of the Russian Orthodox Church also moved to Moscow, which gave it the status as the spiritual center and the seat of Russian Orthodoxy.

In the mid-14th century, some parts of the principality were temporarily given away as appanages. This created the whole system of principalities dependent on Tver. Some of them became independent to the point that they conducted war with Tver. These included:

- Principality of Kashin, around Kashin in the present-day Kashinsky District, Tver Oblast.
- Principality of Kholm, around the disappeared town of Kholm in the present-day Zubtsovsky District, Tver Oblast.
- Principality of Klin, around the town of Klin, modern Klin, Klinsky District, Moscow Oblast.
- Principality of Mikulin, around the town of Mikulin in the present-day Lotoshinsky District, Moscow Oblast.
- Principality of Telyatyevo, around the village of Telyatyevo in the present-day Kalininsky District, Tver Oblast.
- Principality of Zubtsov, around the town of Zubtsov in the present-day Zubtsovsky District, Tver Oblast.

In the 1340s and 1350s, there were inter-princely wars between the various appanages of Tver, particularly between Kashin and Mikulin. The appanage prince of Mikulin, Mikhail Alexandrovich, would eventually emerge victorious and become prince of the reunified realm as Mikhail II of Tver.

=== Rivalry with Moscow during the Great Troubles ===
During the Great Troubles (1359–1381), the Golden Horde descended into a war of succession which weakened it internally and externally, allowing the Grand Duchy of Lithuania under Algirdas (Olgerd) to score a major victory at the Battle of Blue Waters (1362/3). Thereafter, Tver sided with Lithuania against Moscow in the Lithuanian–Muscovite War of 1368–1372. In 1371, Mikhail II of Tver was the last prince of Tver ever appointed as the grand prince of Vladimir. The reign of Mikhail is usually considered as the last period when Tver still could rival Moscow and oppose the Golden Horde. When Algirdas sued for peace with Moscow and retreated in 1372, Tver swifted its allegiance to the powerful Mongol warlord Mamai. In 1375, Mamai again granted Mikhail II the yarlik of grand prince of Vladimir. But the same year, a Muscovite-led expedition besieged Tver for four weeks, forcing Mikhail to sign a treaty recognising Dmitry Donskoy as his "elder brother" and the rightful grand prince of Vladimir, and to pledge military support in the case of a conflict.

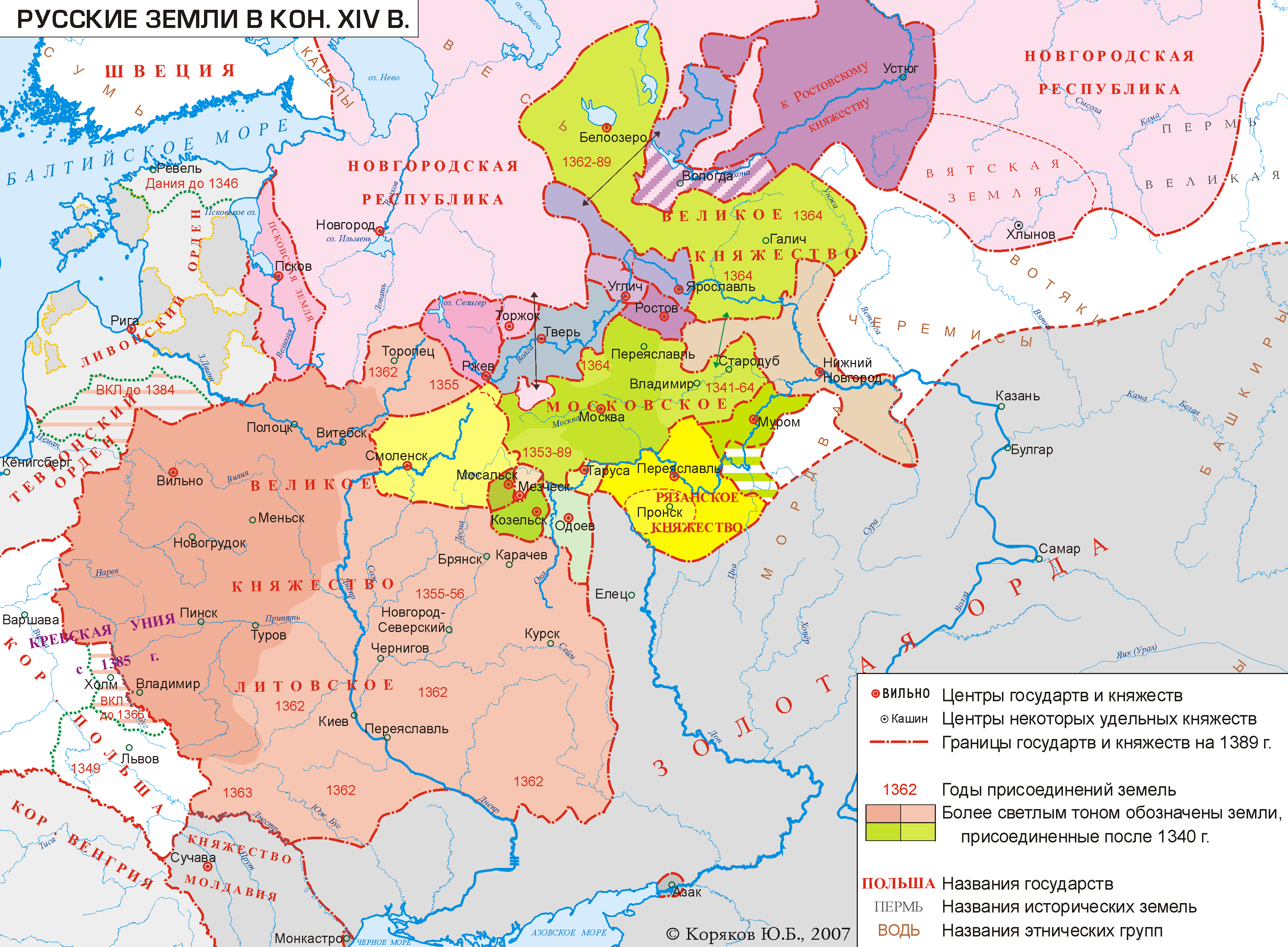
Principality of Tver in 1389

However, no troops of Tver were sent to reinforce Dmitry Donskoy's anti-Mamai coalition at the Battle of Kulikovo in 1380. The symbolic victory had little practical effect, as Tokhtamysh defeated and killed Mamai at the Battle of the Kalka River in 1381, causing Dmitry Donskoy to flee and leaving the Muscovites to their fate when Tokhamysh besieged and sacked Moscow in 1382. In the face of this violent repression, the princes of Tver, Nizhny Novgorod and others immediately submitted to Tokhtamysh. Dmitry of Moscow did so as well, minting coins after 1382 stating proudly "Grand Prince Dimitry Ivanovich" on one side, but submissively "Sultan Tokhtamysh: Long may he live" on the other. Thus, Moscow was still not able to command Tver, Nizhny Novgorod, the Novgorod Republic or Ryazan in the aftermath of Kulikovo and the sack of Moscow.

=== Lithuanian vassalage ===
In the early 15th century, the power of the Golden Horde was waning, while Lithuania rapidly gained strength. Initially pushed back in 1399 at the Battle of the Vorskla River when he sought to expand Lithuanian control over the Pskov and Novgorod republics, Vytautas (Vitovt) gained direct control over Smolensk (1404), indirect control over certain Novgorodian holdings (1408, 1428), an alliance with Boris of Tver (1427) and Ryazan (1430), and considerable influence over the Muscovite court as Vasily I's father-in-law between 1406 and 1430. When the Muscovite War of Succession (1425–1453) broke out, the principalities of Tver, Rostov, Yaroslavl, Ryazan, Novgorod and Pskov were all still independent of Moscow, and usually in alliance with Lithuania against Moscow, which however did have more territory and resources than the other northeastern Rus' principalities by 1425.

The passages from the pokhval'noe slovo ("word of praise") to Boris of Tver, attributed to the monk Foma, have led to scholars to conclude that Tver held similar aspirations as Moscow to become the heir of the Byzantine Empire. Scholars have also interpreted the Slovo as an expression of aspirations by Tver to become the center for the unification of the Russian land (russkaya zemlya). Charles Halperin instead argues that Foma did not suggest Tver as Constantinople's successor and that he also did not seek to identify Tver with the Russian land, as the concept had been taken over by Moscow, instead suggesting that the Tverian land (tferskaia zemlya) and Muscovite land (moskovskaia zemlya) were equals in the land, and questioning whether Moscow and the Russian land were one, as Muscovite texts seemed to have implied, such as in the retelling of events at the Council of Florence which define the Russian land as the area ruled by Vasily II.

=== Muscovite annexation ===
In the subsequent 1425–1533 period, the rulers of Moscow nevertheless managed to gain the economic and military overhand, switch the order of dynastic succession from the chaotic horizontal to vertical inheritance, reincorporate all Suzdalian appanages, and during wars with Lithuania even annex Ryazan, Novgorod, Pskov, and Smolensk into the Muscovite realm. In the 1470s, Mikhail III of Tver had to sign a number of treaties with Moscow (ruled by Ivan III) which essentially discriminated against Tver. When Mikhail II tried to compensate for the treaties by seeking an alliance with Lithuania, the army of Ivan III swiftly conquered Tver in 1485. The principality was then annexed by Moscow. Tver was given to his son Ivan the Young as an appanage.

== Geography ==
The principality stretched from Kashin in the east to Zubtsov in the west. The entirety of the Shosha River, a tributary of the Volga, was included in the south, as well as the Lama River, a tributary of the Shosha, which flowed from Volok Lamsky, a Novgorodian outpost.

Throughout its history as an independent principality, there is no information about any annexations made by the princes of Tver. Its boundaries were likely the same throughout the 13th to 15th centuries.

== See also ==
- Tver as the Third Rome
- Tver Uprising of 1327
- Novgorod Republic
- Principality of Beloozero
- Principality of Moscow
- Principality of Nizhny Novgorod-Suzdal
- Principality of Ryazan
- Principality of Smolensk
- Principality of Yaroslavl
- Vladimir-Suzdal

== Bibliography ==
- Fennell, John (2014) [1983]. The Crisis of Medieval Russia, 1200–1304. Longman History of Russia. Routledge. ISBN 978-0-582-48150-3.
- Halperin, Charles J. (1987). Russia and the Golden Horde: The Mongol Impact on Medieval Russian History. Indiana University. p. 222. ISBN 9781850430575. (e-book).
- Martin, Janet (2007). Medieval Russia: 980–1584. Second Edition. E-book. Cambridge: Cambridge University Press. ISBN 978-0-511-36800-4.
