= Charles J. Halperin =

American historian specialising in Rus' and Russian history

Charles J. Halperin (born 1946) is an American historian specialising in the high and late medieval history of Eastern Europe, particularly the political and military history of late Kievan Rus', the Golden Horde, and early Muscovy. Aside from several monographs, including three on Ivan the Terrible, over 100 articles of Halperin have been published.

== Biography ==
Born in Brooklyn, New York City on 21 July 1946, Halperin studied history between 1963 and 1967 at Brooklyn College of the City University of New York (CUNY), obtaining a Bachelor of Arts. He went on to obtain a PhD in Russian history from Columbia University. In 1971–1972, a Fulbright–Hays Program scholarship allowed him to do research in the Soviet Union, where he expanded his knowledge of the Russian language and writings of Russian scholars. From 1972 to 1980, Halperin taught Russian history as assistant professor at the Department of History of Indiana University Bloomington. As a senior fellow of Columbia University's Russian Institute (since 1992 Harriman Institute) from 1980 to 1982, Halperin returned to the Soviet Union in autumn 1981 as part of a scientific collaboration agreement. In subsequent years, he worked as a computer instructor, programmer and system analyst, returning to Bloomington in 1996 as a Visiting Scholar at Indiana University's Robert F. Byrnes Russian and East European Institute.

Two of Halperin's most influential monographs have been Russia and the Golden Horde: The Mongol Impact on Medieval Russian History (1987 [1985]) and The Tatar Yoke: The Image of the Mongols in Medieval Russia (1986), in which he challenged several Moscow-centric, Great Russian, and Russian nationalist as well as Ukrainian nationalist traditions in historiography. These included the centuries-long tacit denial that the Mongols had really defeated and conquered Kievan Rus', and the false assertion that the Rus' princes were still constantly fighting against the invaders. (Note: "Either the Christian God was not omnipotent, which was unthinkable, or else the Mongol conquest was his will. Faced with these two possibilities, the Russian bookman chose not to choose. Rather than rationalize conquest as other peoples had done, Russian intellectuals implicitly denied that it had occurred. (...) Texts from the late fourteenth and fifteenth centuries, generations after the conquest, accused the Mongols of plotting to rule Russia, as though this had not long been a fait accompli.") In reality, the Rus' princes had been forced to completely submit themselves to the Golden Horde, and doing its bidding and adopting much of its culture, or suffer the dire consequences of a devastating punitive military expedition by the Mongols, Tatars and their other Rus' allies. In 2011, Halperin stated that Fomenko and Nosovskii's popular pseudohistorical Novaia khronologiia (New Chronology), which received some attention in the early 1980s, arose out of "the dilemma of the Mongol conquest in Russian historiography": embarrassment among defensive Russian nationalists who object to "Russophobic" arguments that Russia acquired "barbarian" customs, institutions, and culture from uncivilized nomads.

On the causes of the Tver Uprising of 1327, Janet L. B. Martin (1995, 2007) wrote: "While some scholars argue that Chol-khan had been sent deliberately to provoke a crisis in Tver' because the Mongol court perceived that principality as too powerful, Charles Halperin has suggested quite plausibly that his purpose was to oversee conscription and collection of revenue, which the Horde required in preparation for another campaign against the Ilkhans of Persia over Azerbaijan." She similarly accepted the evidence presented by Halperin, Borisov, Kuchkin and others that certain texts, claiming that the Battle of Kulikovo represented a "nationally unified campaign for independence from Mongol suzerainty", were not written until the 15th century; instead the larger conflict of the Great Troubles was primarily one of dynastic struggle amongst the Mongol-Tatar elite, while a competition for the timely delivery of tribute payments amongst their Rus' vassals. Halperin belongs to a group of scholars who argue that the princes of Moscow continued to accept the authority of the Mongol khans well into the 15th century, that there was a Muscovite–Crimean Tatar alliance in the late 15th and early 16th century, and that the Russo-Kazan Wars happened because Muscovy was interfering in Kazan's dynastic struggles on behalf of the Crimean khans, not because Kazan posed a threat to Rus' lands.

Halperin has engaged in a years-long but amicable public debate with Ukrainian historian Serhii Plokhy about the translatio of the Rus' land from the Middle Dnieper to Suzdalia. In his book The Origin of the Slavic Nations (2006), Plokhy said he has found their discussions 'very helpful', was convinced by several of Halperin's arguments, and recommended his papers on 15th-century Tverian political thought (1997) and Russian historiography on the Golden Horde (2004). While continuing to disagree in his 2010 review ('The chronology of the translatio of the myth of the Rus' Land from Kievan Rus' to Moscow is still a matter of contention'), Halperin in turn praised Plokhy's 2006 book as a 'masterfully constructed mosaic', though suggesting some corrections: 'The enormous value of [Plokhy's] contribution to scholarship cannot possibly be impaired by such a critique; indeed, in the best of all worlds fine-tuning some of the tiles should improve the artistry of his overall image.' He acknowlegded Plokhy's point that he needed to revise some of his earlier publications in which he had used the unreliable reconstruction of the Trinity Chronicle for dating purposes, which Halperin (2001) himself told fellow scholars to stop doing. In his 2022 updated bundle of all previous articles about the Rus' land (published at Plokhy's suggestion), Halperin 'replaced citations to the Trinity Chronicle with references to the Simeonov Chronicle.'

== Selected works ==
Monographs

- Charles J. Halperin, The Tatar Yoke: The Image of the Mongols in Medieval Russia (1986, 2009).
- Halperin, Charles J. (1987). Russia and the Golden Horde: The Mongol Impact on Medieval Russian History. p. 222. ISBN 9781850430575. (e-book).
- Halperin, Charles J. (2007). Spinei, Victor; Bilavschi, George (eds.). Russia and the Mongols: Slavs and the Steppe in Medieval and Early Modern Russia. Bucharest: Ed. Academiae Romane. p. 348. ISBN 978-973-27-1619-9. (edited collection of previously published papers).
- Halperin, Charles J. (2019). Ivan the Terrible: Free to Reward and Free to Punish. p. 360.
- Halperin, Charles J. (2020). Ivan IV and Muscovy.
- Halperin, Charles J. (2021). Ivan the Terrible in Russian Historical Memory since 1991. Academic Studies Press. p. 308. ISBN 9781644695876.
- Halperin, Charles J. (2022). The Rise and Demise of the Myth of the Rus' Land (PDF). Leeds: Arc Humanities Press. p. 107. ISBN 9781802700565.

Journal articles (chronological selection)

- Halperin, Charles J. (1977). "Tverian Political Thought in the Fifteenth Century". Cahiers du Monde russe et soviétique. 18 (3). EHESS: 267–273. doi:10.3406/cmr.1977.1294. ISSN 0008-0160. JSTOR 27669454.
- Charles J. Halperin, “The Russian Land and the Russian Tsar: The Emergence of Muscovite Ideology, 1380–1408,” Forschungen zur osteuropäischen Geschichte 23 (1976): 7–103.
- Charles J. Halperin, "Some Observations on Interpolations in the Skazanie o Mamaevom poboishche," International Journal of Slavic Linguistics and Poetics 23 (1981) [1982]: 97–100.
- Halperin, Charles J. "George Vernadsky, Eurasianism, the Mongols, and Russia". Slavic Review (1982): 477–493. JSTOR 2497020.
- Halperin, Charles J. (2001). "Text and Textology: Salmina's Dating of the Chronicle Tales about Dmitrii Donskoi". Slavonic and East European Review. 79 (2): 248–263. doi:10.1353/see.2001.0046.
- Halperin, Charles J (2002). "Muscovy as a Hypertrophic State: A Critique". Kritika: Explorations in Russian and Eurasian History. 3 (3): 501–507. doi:10.1353/kri.2002.0036. ISSN 1538-5000.
- Plokhy, Serhii (2006). The Origins of the Slavic Nations: Premodern Identities in Russia, Ukraine, and Belarus (PDF). New York: Cambridge University Press. pp. 10–15. ISBN 978-0-521-86403-9. Archived (PDF) from the original on 6 June 2011.
  - Halperin, Charles J. (2010). "Review Article. "National Identity in Premodern Rus'"". Russian History (Brill journal). 37 (3). Brill Publishers: 275–294. doi:10.1163/187633110X510446. Archived from the original on 26 March 2023. (review of Plokhy 2006, and a response to criticism)
- Halperin, Charles J. (2011). "False Identity and Multiple Identities in Russian History: The Mongol Empire and Ivan the Terrible". The Carl Beck Papers (2103). The Center for Russian and East European Studies: 1–71. doi:10.5195/cbp.2011.160.
- Halperin, Charles J. (17 February 2016). "A Tatar interpretation of the battle of Kulikovo Field, 1380: Rustam Nabiev". Nationalities Papers. 44 (1): 4–19. doi:10.1080/00905992.2015.1063594. ISSN 0090-5992. S2CID 129150302.

== Bibliography ==
- Martin, Janet (2007). Medieval Russia: 980–1584. Second Edition. E-book. Cambridge: Cambridge University Press. ISBN 978-0-511-36800-4.
