= Siege of Moscow (1382) =

Conflict between the Grand Duchy of Moscow and the Golden Horde

- Part of the Great Troubles
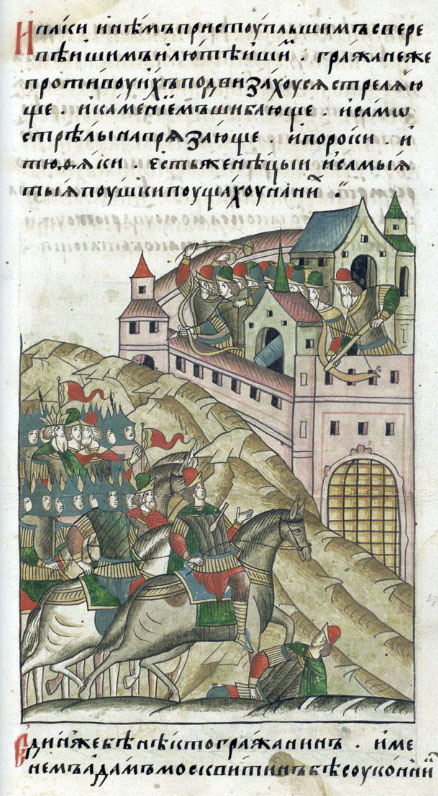
- Tokhtamysh in front of Moscow, miniature from the Illustrated Chronicle of Ivan the Terrible (16th century)
Date	23–26 August 1382
Location	Moscow 55°45′21″N 37°37′2″E
Result	Golden Horde victory
Territorial changes	Sack of Serpukhov, Pereyaslavl, and Kolomna

Belligerents
Golden Horde; Principality of Nizhny Novgorod-Suzdal	Principality of Moscow

Commanders and leaders
(Golden Horde) Tokhtamysh	Dmitry Donskoy (AWOL); Ostei †

Casualties and losses
(Golden Horde) Unknown	24,000 killed

The siege of Moscow in 1382 was a battle between the Principality of Moscow and Tokhtamysh, khan of the Golden Horde.

In August 1382, Tokhtamysh led a large army toward Moscow. At that time, Prince Dmitry Donskoy was not in the city as he was seeking assistance from other Russian territories. As a result, Moscow's defense was left in the hands of the people and a small garrison. Tokhtamysh used deception to breach Moscow’s defenses. He pretended to come in peace and promised that if the people of Moscow surrendered, they would be spared. However, once the city gates were opened, the Mongol-Tatar forces stormed in and carried out a brutal massacre.

After entering the city, the Mongol forces destroyed buildings, plundered valuables, and killed thousands of residents. It is estimated that around 24,000 people in Moscow perished during this event. The city was also burned to the ground, and many survivors were taken captive and transported to the Golden Horde as slaves. On the way back, one of the Horde's detachments was attacked by Russians and was defeated, although Tokhtamysh's main army avoided the battle.

This brutality demonstrated that the Golden Horde still had the power to suppress and control Russian territories, despite their earlier setback at the Battle of Kulikovo.

The attack reaffirmed the Golden Horde dominance over Russia. Following Moscow’s destruction, Dmitry Donskoy was forced to submit once again to the Golden Horde and resume paying tribute to avoid further attacks.

== Background ==
The siege of Moscow in 1382 was motivated by khan Tokhtamysh's desire to punish Muscovy for its audacity to challenge the authority of the Golden Horde at the Battle of Kulikovo (1380). Even though it was his rival warlord Mamai who was defeated at Kulikovo, and Tokhtamysh personally defeated Mamai the next year at the Battle of the Kalka River (1381) to become the undisputed khan of the Golden Horde, he wanted to make Moscow an example of what happened if anyone dared defy Mongol supremacy over the principalities. Tokhtamysh allied himself (in part through coercion) with the princes of Tver, Ryazan, and Nizhny Novgorod against Muscovy, and launched a surprise attack on the city in 1382. Prince Dmitry Donskoy, who had led his largely Muscovite army to a pyrrhic victory at Kulikovo two years earlier, abandoned his capital and fled north, leaving the dismayed citizens of Moscow to ask a Lithuanian prince named Ostei (or Ostej), a grandson of Algirdas, to lead the defence. (Note: "With more common sense than valour, Dmitriy Donskoi withdrew northward, leaving the people of his capital to their fate. In their consternation, they turned to a Lithuanian prince, Ostei, to lead the defence of the city.")

The Tale of the Invasion of Tokhtamysh contains an account of the 1382 siege of Moscow. As the khan's forces drew nearer, it narrates:

[Among the Russian princes there was] not unity, but distrust. And then, the pious prince [Dmitry Donskoy] came to an understanding and enlightenment, and after consideration, became perplexed and lost in thought, thereafter he became afraid to take a stand against the tsar [Tokhtamysh] himself. And he did not go to battle against him, and did not raise his hands against the tsar, but went to his city Pereyaslavl, and from there—past Rostov, and then, I will say, hastily to Kostroma. (...) The townspeople [of Moscow] were agitated and raged like drunkards. Some wanted to stay, shutting themselves up in the city, while others thought to flee. And a great strife broke out between those and others: some with belongings rushed to the city, while others fled from the city, robbed.

== Siege ==
The Muscovite defenders are recorded to have used traditional weapons such as arrows and boiling water, with some sources claiming that they also employed early firearms with gunpowder.

The princes of Nizhniy Novgorod, who were the brothers-in-law of Dmitry Donskoy, tricked the Muscovite citizens into surrendering the city. This happened when they opened the gates to the Mongols and their Rus' allies on 26 August 1382, whereupon they immediately sacked the city. According to Crummey (1987, 2014), the besiegers lured Ostei out of the fortress under the pretense of seeking negotiations, killed him, and then broke into the Muscovite citadel, put many of its defenders to the sword, and destroyed large parts of Moscow city. Tokhtamysh ordered his troops to also pillage many smaller towns in the surrounding region afterwards. These included Serpukhov, Pereyaslavl, and Kolomna. As his army went home to the south, it also sacked the principality of Riazan along the way.

== Aftermath ==
Dmitri Donskoy was forced to reaffirm his allegiance to the Golden Horde, and resumed paying the tribute (which was probably increased as punishment). Although Tokhtamysh did not deprive Donskoy of the title of grand prince of Vladimir, he did take his son Vasily hostage for several years (until he escaped upon his second attempt, and imposed a heavy tribute on all of Vladimir-Suzdalia).

Kirpichnikov stated: "There is no dispute that Tokhtamysh's invasion of Moscow slowed the unification of the country and revived the separatism of some local rulers who rival the grand duke."

== Sources ==
- Crummey, Robert O. (2014) [1987]. The Formation of Muscovy 1300–1613. Routledge. pp. 52–62. ISBN 978-1-317-87200-9.
- Halperin, Charles J. (1987). Russia and the Golden Horde: The Mongol Impact on Medieval Russian History. p. 222. ISBN 978-1-85043-057-5. (e-book).
- Jackson, P. (2018). The Mongols and the West: 1221–1410 (2nd ed.). Routledge.
- Shaikhutdinov, Marat (2021). "3.4 Invasion of Tokhtamysh". Between East and West: The Formation of the Moscow State. Academic Studies Press. pp. 104–107. ISBN 978-1-64469-715-3.
- Seleznev, Yuri V. (2010). Русско-ордынские конфликты в XIII-XV веках [Russian-Horde conflicts in the 13th-15th centuries] (in Russian). Moscow: Квадрига. ISBN 978-5-91791-047-5.
