= Andrey of Gorodets =

Russian prince (died 1304)

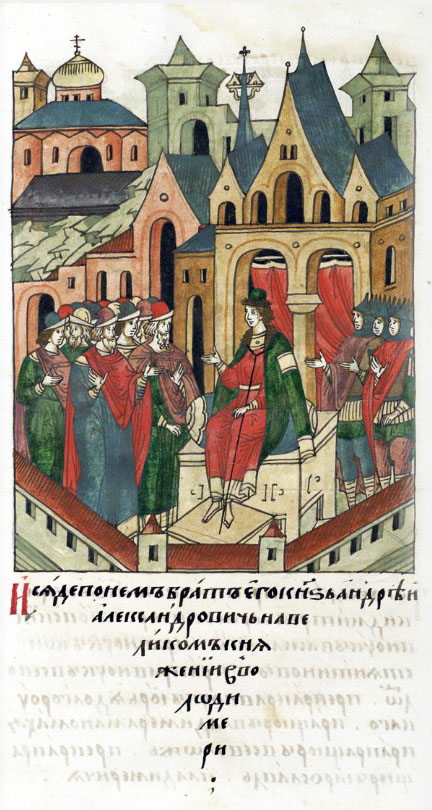
Andrey III on the throne in Vladimir, miniature from the Illustrated Chronicle of Ivan the Terrible (16th century)

Andrey III Aleksandrovich (Russian: Андрей Александрович; c. 1255 – 27 July 1304) was Grand Prince of Vladimir from 1281 to 1283 and again from 1294 until his death in 1304. He was a son of Alexander Nevsky and received from his father the town of Gorodets on the Volga. In 1276, he added Kostroma to his possessions and joined the struggle for the Grand Principality of Vladimir.

== Life ==
In 1281, joining the Mongol army, Andrey expelled his elder brother Dmitry from Vladimir. After some feasting with Mongols in Vladimir, Andrey went to Novgorod, where the populace made him heartily welcome. Meanwhile, his brother allied himself with the powerful Mongol general Nogai Khan, who reinstated Dmitry as the grand prince of Vladimir in 1283, despite Tode Mongke, the khan of the Golden Horde, supporting Andrey.

In Dyuden's campaign of 1293, a combined Russo-Tatar army led by Andrey and Dyuden caused devastation to 14 Russian towns, and Dmitry was forced to flee to Pskov, allowing Andrey to take the title of grand prince. During the campaign, Andrey and Dyuden planned to take Tver, which housed many refugees; however, Mikhail of Tver returned in time, which caused Andrey and Dyuden to abort their plan after learning about his presence there. Instead, after devastating the towns of Vladimir-Suzdal, the two took Volokolamsk. The Novgorodians were able to bribe the Tatars to leave the town and request Andrey to serve as their prince, which satisfied him enough and led to the Tatar troops to be withdrawn. Andrey's appanage center of Gorodets remained untouched by the campaign, as well as the cities in the north that belonged to the princes of Rostov.

Even when elevated to the grand princely throne of Vladimir, Andrey continued to live in Gorodets. During the last decade of his reign, he struggled with a league formed by Daniel of Moscow, Mikhail of Tver, and Ivan of Pereslavl. In 1301, he drove the Swedes from Landskrona near present-day Saint Petersburg.

== See also ==
- Family tree of Russian monarchs

== Sources ==
- "Андрей Александрович, князь городецкий и костромской" . Brockhaus and Efron Encyclopedic Dictionary (in Russian). 1906.
- Favereau, Marie; Pochekaev, Roman Yu. (2023). "The Golden Horde, c. 1260–1502". The Cambridge History of the Mongol Empire. Cambridge University Press. pp. 243–318. ISBN 978-1-107-11648-1.
- Fennell, John (2014) [1983]. The Crisis of Medieval Russia, 1200–1304. Longman History of Russia. Routledge. ISBN 978-0-582-48150-3.
- Shaikhutdinov, Marat (23 November 2021). Between East and West: The Formation of the Moscow State. doi:10.2307/j.ctv249sgn2.

Regnal titles
Preceded by Dmitry of Pereslavl	Grand Prince of Vladimir; 1293–1304	Succeeded by Mikhail of Tver
