= Battle of the Kalka River (1381) =

1381 battle between Mamai and Tokhtamysh

- Part of the Great Troubles
Date	1381
Location	Kalka river
Result	Defeat of Mamai

Belligerents
Mamai's faction	Tokhtamysh's faction

Commanders and leaders
Mamai	Tokhtamysh

Strength
Unknown, smaller	Unknown

Casualties and losses
Unknown, most likely higher	Unknown

The Battle of the Kalka River (Russian: Битва на Калке) in 1381 was fought between the Mongol warlords Mamai and Tokhtamysh for control of the Golden Horde. Tokhtamysh was the victor and became sole ruler of the Horde.

== Battle ==
Mamai previously had de facto control over the Horde (though he was never declared khan), but his control began to crumble when Tokhtamysh of the White Horde invaded. At the same time the Russian princes rebelled against his rule, removing a valuable source of tax income from Mamai. Mamai was defeated at the famous 1380 Battle of Kulikovo, at which a Muscovite-led coalition of Russian princes scored a pyrrhic victory. (Note: "[I]t is clear that Moscow had won a pyrrhic victory [at Kulikovo]. Russian losses were so great that Moscow could now raise another army to take advantage of Mamai's defeat. Mamai, on the other hand, mobilized more troops and prepared for a second campaign against Russia.") Mamai raised more troops and prepared another operation to subdue these rebellious Russian principalities once more. Meanwhile in the east, Tokhtamysh had seized the Golden Horde's capital, Sarai. Mamai was forced to abandon his planned second Russian campaign to deal with Tokhtamysh first. (Note: "Luckily for Moscow, the arrival of Tokhtamysh, pretender to the throne of the Volga khanate and client of the powerful Tamerlane, caused Mamai to abandon his Russian scheme. Unluckily for Moscow, Tokhtamysh had the same plans and carried them out after defeating emir Mamai on the river Kalka.") The armies clashed at the region around the northern Donets and Kalka Rivers. Tokhtamysh won a decisive victory. He subsequently took over the Golden Horde as undisputed khan.

According to the earliest version of the "Chronicle Tale" (Letopisnaia povest’), Tokhtamysh informed the Muscovite prince Dmitry Donskoy that he had defeated their mutual enemy Mamai.

== Bibliography ==
- Halperin, Charles J. (1987). Russia and the Golden Horde: The Mongol Impact on Medieval Russian History. p. 222. ISBN 9781850430575. (e-book).
- Halperin, Charles J. (17 February 2016). "A Tatar interpretation of the battle of Kulikovo Field, 1380: Rustam Nabiev". Nationalities Papers. 44 (1): 4–19. doi:10.1080/00905992.2015.1063594. ISSN 0090-5992. S2CID 129150302.
