= Treaty of Lyubutsk =

1372 peace treaty between Lithuania and Moscow

The Treaty of Lyubutsk (Russian: Любутский мир) was a peace treaty signed in the summer of 1372 between Algirdas, Grand Duke of Lithuania, and Dmitry Donskoy, Grand Prince of Moscow. The treaty ended the Lithuanian–Muscovite War of 1368–1372 and resulted in peace for seven years.

== History ==
=== Background ===
The influence and power of the Principality of Moscow grew steadily and its interests clashed with those of Lithuania. After the Battle of Blue Waters in 1362, Lithuania took over Kiev and now directly bordered Moscow. Algirdas assisted Tver, the chief rival of Moscow, and attempted to promote his brother-in-law Mikhail II of Tver to the throne of the Grand Principality of Vladimir, a long-time possession of Moscow.

=== Signing of the treaty ===
In 1372, Algirdas organized a third attack against Moscow. The other two attacks in 1368 and 1370 reached the city of Moscow, but did not succeed in taking the Kremlin. The same year, the Lithuanian army was stopped near Lyubutsk, a fort on the Oka River northeast of Tula. The Lithuanian vanguard troops were defeated and were forced to retreat. Algirdas secured his position in steep hills and faced Dmitry Donskoy's army. After a standoff, a peace treaty was concluded. Algirdas agreed to abandon his plans of promoting Mikhail, thus ending Lithuania's assistance to Tver. The peace lasted for about seven years until 1379, when, following the death of Algirdas in 1377, his eldest son Andrei of Polotsk allied himself with Moscow against Jogaila.

=== Aftermath ===
The raids to Moscow consumed many resources, but did not achieve any significant results. They strengthened Moscow's prestige and influence in Rus' and signified that Lithuanian eastward expansion into Slavic lands was coming to an end.

The peace treaty allowed Dmitry Donskoy to focus on the Golden Horde and he therefore became the first prince of Moscow to directly challenge Mongol authority in Russia. In 1380, he led a Russian army at the Battle of Kulikovo and defeated Mamai. Following Mamai's downfall, Dmitry resumed the payment of tribute to Tokhtamysh. Vasily I of Moscow made peace with Lithuania again in 1392.

== Sources ==
- Gillespie, Alexander (December 2016). The Causes of War: Volume II: 1000 CE to 1400 CE. Bloomsbury Academic. ISBN 978-1-84946-645-5.<
