= Kildi Beg =

Khan of the Golden Horde from 1361 to 1362

Khan of the Golden Horde Western Half (Blue Horde)
- Reign: 1361–1362
- Predecessor: Ordu Malik
- Successor: Abdallāh
- Died: August/September 1362
- Dynasty: Borjigin
- Father: Jani Beg (pretended)
- Religion: Islam

Kildi Beg (Turki/Kypchak: کلدی بک; died 1362) was Khan of the Golden Horde from 1361 to 1362, having replaced his rival Ordu Malik.

The origins and identity of the khan who reigned under the name Kildi Beg pose problems. A prince of this name was a son of Iran Beg, son of Khan Öz Beg, according to the comprehensive genealogical compendium Muʿizz al-ansāb. He was apparently killed during the purge of the royal family by his cousin, Khan Berdi Beg, in 1357: according to the Čingīz-Nāmah, Khan Kildi Beg's authenticity was called into question precisely because the real Kildi Beg had been killed by Berdi Beg. According to Muʿīn-ad-Dīn Naṭanzī, moreover, Khan Kildi Beg was an impostor who claimed to be a son of Khan Jani Beg, whereas the genuine prince would have been Jani Beg's brother's son and would not have needed to claim his uncle as father to legitimize himself. An additional complication with Kildi Beg is that a number of eastern sources insert him between the reigns of Berdi Beg and Nawruz Beg, i.e., in 1359–1360, at the same point in time when, according to western sources, the khan was Qulpa, unknown to the eastern sources. In the Čingīz-Nāmah, the pretended Kildi Beg is said to have been raised to the throne by Taydula Khatun, the widow of Öz Beg, who had been spurned by her first choice as khan and consort, Khiḍr Khan. When Kildi Beg's authenticity was questioned and he was not obeyed, he was replaced with Bazarchi (possibly identical with the familiar Nawruz Beg). It would seem that this pretended Kildi Beg corresponds to Qulpa, who reigned between Berdi Beg and Nawruz Beg.

Muʿīn-ad-Dīn Naṭanzī (earlier known as the "Anonymous of Iskandar") also placed a pretended Kildi Beg immediately after Berdi Beg, as a puppet of his conniving emirs. However, Naṭanzī related that Kildi Beg began to eliminate his emirs by pitting them one against the other, and one of the victims of these machinations was the beglerbeg Mogul Buqa; from other sources we know that Mogul Buqa survived the fall of Nawruz Beg and Taydula Khatun, and the purge of their supporters by the new Khan Khiḍr in 1360. This pretended Kildi Beg, therefore, belongs after Khiḍr Khan, something confirmed by other narrative and numismatic evidence. Whether all this suggests that more than one khan pretended to be Kildi Beg or whether a group of eastern sources conflated the pretended Kildi Beg with the obscure Qulpa, remains unclear.

Whoever he was, the pretended Kildi Beg attested in contemporary evidence appears to have emerged as a claimant to the throne of the Golden Horde in 1361, when it was contested among Khiḍr Khan's son Timur Khwaja and brother Murād (or Mürid), and their rival Ordu Malik. Kildi Beg's earliest supporter was apparently the emir Yaglï Bay, a son of Berdi Beg's official Tughluq Beg, perhaps the true power behind Kildi Beg. Their cause was soon joined by the autonomous governor of Mokhshi, Tagai, and the former beglerbeg Mamai. Defeating their rivals, they seized the capital Sarai, killed Ordu Malik, and enthroned Kildi Beg in October 1361; now, if not earlier, Mamai perhaps pursued and killed the already expelled Timur Khwaja. Kildi Beg's coins were minted at Mokhshi, Azaq, and Sarai. However, Khiḍr Khan's brother Murād remained unsubdued and in control of at least Gülistan. The competition between the rival khans made the Russian princes postpone travel to the khan's court for securing investiture diplomas. Kildi Beg proceeded to eliminate a number of high officials, including the former beglerbeg Mogul Buqa; whether he did so in the manner described by Naṭanzī or not, his cruelty is also mentioned in the Russian chronicles. In the process, he seems to have lost some of his supporters, including Mamai, who returned to his base in the area of the Crimea and proclaimed a khan of his own, ʿAbdallāh. Weakened by such desertions, Kildi Beg was defeated and killed on the Volga against Murād in August or September 1362. Mamai was now able to install his own khan at Sarai in September 1362, for a brief period, before he was driven out by the victorious Murād. This, at least, is the general view. The appearance of Kildi Beg's name on coins minted at Yangishehr (perhaps Old Orhei in Bessarabia) in the year of the Hijra 765 (= AD 10 October 1363 – 27 September 1364) and at Azaq in the year of the Hijra 767 (September 1365-September 1366), has been interpreted as indicating Kildi Beg's survival after his defeat and loss of Sarai. However, these dates and issues have been dismissed as erroneous.

== Genealogy ==
- Genghis Khan
- Jochi
- Batu
- Toqoqan
- Mengu-Timur
- Toghrilcha
- Öz Beg
- Iran Beg
- Kildi Beg

== See also ==
- List of khans of the Golden Horde

== Bibliography ==
- Gaev, A. G., "Genealogija i hronologija Džučidov," Numizmatičeskij sbornik 3 (2002) 9-55.
- Grekov, B. D., and A. J. Jakubovskij, Zolotaja orda i eë padenie. Moscow, 1950.
- Grigor'ev, A. P., "Zolotoordynskie hany 60-70-h godov XIV v.: hronologija pravlenii," Istriografija i istočnikovedenie stran Azii i Afriki 7 (1983) 9-54.
- Howorth, H. H., History of the Mongols from the 9th to the 19th Century. Part II.1. London, 1880.
- Judin, V. P., Utemiš-hadži, Čingiz-name, Alma-Ata, 1992.
- May, T., The Mongol Empire. Edinburgh, 2018.
- Nasonov, A. N., Mongoly i Rus', Moscow, 1940.
- Počekaev, R. J., Cari ordynskie: Biografii hanov i pravitelej Zolotoj Ordy. Saint Petersburg, 2010.
- Sabitov, Ž. M., Genealogija "Tore", Astana, 2008.
- Safargaliev, M. G., Raspad Zolotoj Ordy. Saransk, 1960.
- Sidorenko, V. A., "Hronologija pravlenii zolotoordynskih hanov 1357-1380 gg.," Materialov po arheologii, istorii i ètnografii Tavrii 7 (2000) 267–288.
- Thackston, W. M. (trans.), Khwandamir, Habibu's-siyar. Tome Three. Cambridge, MA, 1994.
- Tizengauzen, V. G. (trans.), Sbornik materialov otnosjaščihsja k istorii Zolotoj Ordy. Izvlečenija iz persidskih sočinenii, republished as Istorija Kazahstana v persidskih istočnikah. 4. Almaty, 2006.
- Vernadsky, G., The Mongols and Russia, New Haven, 1953.
- Vohidov, Š. H. (trans.), Istorija Kazahstana v persidskih istočnikah. 3. Muʿizz al-ansāb. Almaty, 2006.

Preceded by Ordu Malik	Khan of the Golden Horde; 1361–1362	Succeeded by Abdallāh
