= Khiḍr Khan =

Khan of the Golden Horde from 1360 to 1361

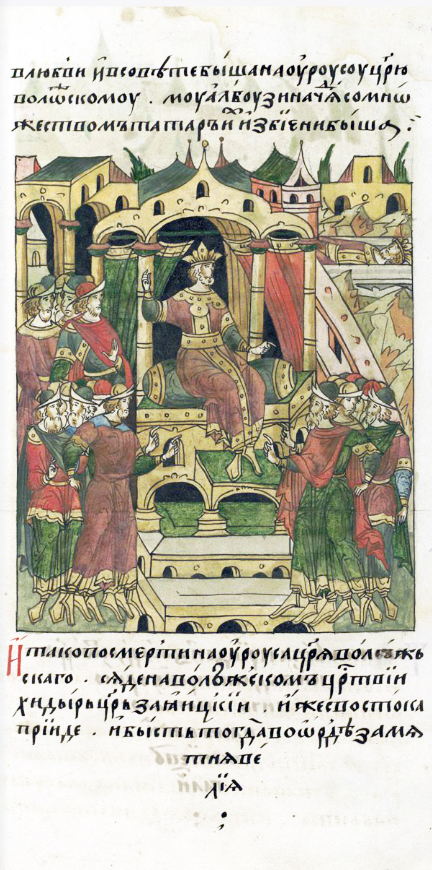
- Miniature from the Illustrated Chronicle of Ivan the Terrible (16th century)

Khan of the Golden Horde Western Half (Blue Horde)
- Reign: 1360–1361
- Predecessor: Nawruz Beg
- Successor: Timur Khwaja
- Died: August 1361
- Issue: Timur Khwaja
- Dynasty: Borjigin
- Father: Mangqutai
- Religion: Islam

Khiḍr Khan (Turki/Kypchak: خضر خان; Persian: محمود خضر خان; scientific transliteration Maḥmūd Ḫiḍr Ḫān, transcribed Hidyr or Khidyr', modern Hyzr or Khyzr in Russian texts) was Khan of the Golden Horde from 1360 to 1361, having overthrown and succeeded Nawruz Beg.

== Reign ==
Earlier scholarship long followed what is now considered the unreliable testimony of Muʿīn-ad-Dīn Naṭanzī (earlier known as the "Anonymous of Iskandar") in seeing Khiḍr Khan as a son of Sasi Buqa, son of Noqai, a supposed descendant of Jochi's son Orda. However, today the testimony of the Tawārīḫ-i guzīdah-i nuṣrat-nāmah is considered more reliable, in asserting that Khiḍr Khan was the son of Mangqutai, son of Töle Buqa, son of Qadaq, son of Shiban, son of Jochi.

Khiḍr Khan's rise to power took place in confused circumstances imperfectly related in the sources. The murder of Berdi Beg in 1359 had possibly ended the line of Batu Khan; his successors Qulpa and Nawruz Beg might have claimed to be Berdi Beg's brothers, but their true antecedents are unclear; if Nawruz Beg is to be identified with Bazarchi, a descendant of Jochi's son Tangqut, he would have strengthened his claim to the throne by marrying the dowager queen Taydula Khatun, widow of Öz Beg, in 1360. But Taydula Khatun's first choice as khan and consort had been Khiḍr, who was declared khan in Gülistan in 1359. Nevertheless, he had refused to marry her and be a puppet ruler, leading her to promote Bazarchi or Nawruz Beg instead. Although he retreated to his base in the Aq Göl region east of the Yaik (Ural River), Khiḍr was still interested in obtaining the throne, and accordingly launched an attempt to do so, with the support of the semi-autonomous governor of Khwarazm, Aq Ḥusayn. This venture met with success: they defeated their opponents and in June 1360 Khiḍr Khan was enthroned at the capital, Sarai. He proceeded to execute Nawruz Beg, his son Timur, and Taydula Khatun, among others. Although the new khan also executed many of the kinsmen or dependents of the chief emir Mogul Buqa, the latter survived the purge.

If Khiḍr Khan was forceful enough to seize the throne, and reputed to be stern and exacting, his reign was not long enough to secure any great advantage. He attempted to assert stronger control over Russia, retaliating for Novgorodian raids on Volga Bulghar territory by punishing local Christians, sending three emissaries to the Russian princes, and summoning Prince Dmitry of Moscow to his court, where the grand prince of Vladimir and the princes of Nizhny Novgorod, Rostov, and Tver were also assembled. But the emir Mamai was effectively autonomous in the west, while the former Ulus of Orda in the east was practically independent under its own Jochid khan, Qara Noqai, a rival of Khiḍr Khan. Moreover, in 1361 Khiḍr Khan was challenged closer to home by another Jochid prince, Ordu Malik. At that point, Khiḍr Khan and his son Qutlugh were murdered by another son, Timur Khwaja. The latter seized the throne but maintained himself on it for only a few days or a few weeks before being driven out by Ordu Malik. (Some sources name Khiḍr Khan's parricide son Murād or Murdad, which is actually the name of one of Khiḍr Khan's brothers, who ruled later, in 1362–1364.)

== Genealogy ==
- Genghis Khan
- Jochi
- Shiban
- Qadaq
- Töle Buqa
- Mangqutai
- Khiḍr Khan

== See also ==
- List of khans of the Golden Horde

== Bibliography ==
- Gaev, A. G., "Genealogija i hronologija Džučidov," Numizmatičeskij sbornik 3 (2002) 9-55.
- Grekov, B. D., and A. J. Jakubovskij, Zolotaja orda i eë padenie. Moscow, 1950.
- Grigor'ev, A. P., "Zolotoordynskie hany 60-70-h godov XIV v.: hronologija pravlenii," Istriografija i istočnikovedenie stran Azii i Afriki 7 (1983) 9-54.
- Howorth, H. H., History of the Mongols from the 9th to the 19th Century. Part II.1. London, 1880.
- Judin, V. P., Utemiš-hadži, Čingiz-name, Alma-Ata, 1992.
- May, T., The Mongol Empire. Edinburgh, 2018.
- Morgan, D., The Mongols. Oxford, 1986.
- Počekaev, R. J., Cari ordynskie: Biografii hanov i pravitelej Zolotoj Ordy. Saint Petersburg, 2010.
- Safargaliev, M. G., Raspad Zolotoj Ordy. Saransk, 1960.
- Sagdeeva, R. Z., Serebrjannye monety hanov Zolotoj Ordy, Moscow, 2005.
- Thackston, W. M. (trans.), Khwandamir, Habibu's-siyar. Tome Three. Cambridge, MA, 1994.
- Vohidov, Š. H. (trans.), Istorija Kazahstana v persidskih istočnikah. 3. Muʿizz al-ansāb. Almaty, 2006.

Preceded by Nawruz Beg	Khan of the Golden Horde; 1360–1361	Succeeded by Timur Khwaja
