= Taydula Khatun =

Wife of Öz Beg Khan (died 1360)

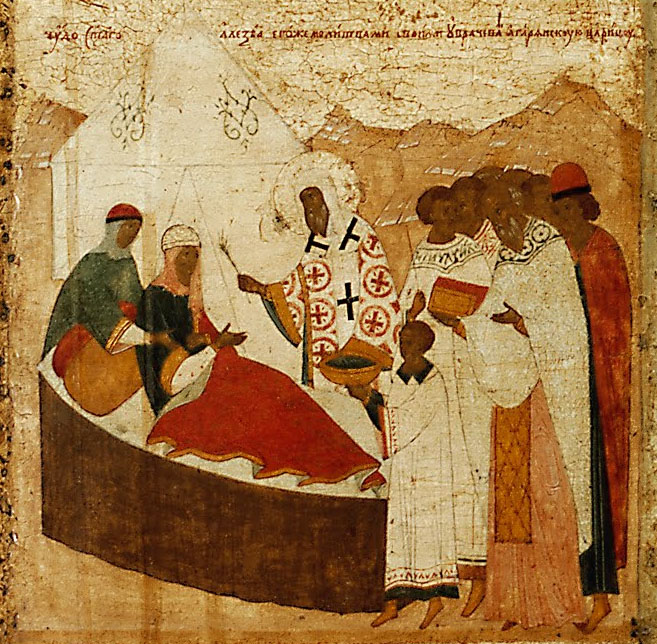
- Russian icon by Dionisius depicting Metropolitan Aleksej curing Taydula Khatun, late 15th or early 16th century
- Died: 1360
- Spouse: Öz Beg Khan; Nawruz Beg
- Issue: Jani Beg; Tini Beg

Taydula Khatun (Turki/Kypchak and Persian: طیطغلی خاتون; died 1360) was the wife of Öz Beg Khan of the Golden Horde (r. 1313–1341), and possibly Nawruz Beg (r. 1360). She was also the mother of the khans Tini Beg (r. 1341–1342) and Jani Beg (r. 1342–1357), and the grandmother of Berdi Beg (r. 1357–1359).

The primary wife of her husband, she gained and retained a lasting importance during the reigns of her sons and grandson, and attempted to hold on to power by appointing the latter's successors.

== Name ==
Her name is rendered variously in her own time as Ṭayṭughlī Ḫātūn (by Ibn Baṭṭūṭa), Thaythalu-Katon (by the Venetian doge and head of state Andrea Dandolo), and Taydula (by Russian sources and translations of Mongol documents). It is rationalized and interpreted variously, too, as Tayd-oghli, or more likely Tay-Tughuli, "having a foal tail (standard)," more comparable with the apparent form Tay-Dūla.

== Background ==
Contemporary records are silent about Taydula's background. Later accounts, namely the Berlin manuscript of the Däftär-i-J̌ingiz-nāmä (Historia Dschingischani, folio 13R5), suggest that she belonged to the Kipchak people. Mária Ivanics, a professor of Altaic studies, considers the absence of information on Taydula's background makes a Kipchak heritage possible. Ivanics states that, had Taydula belonged to a distinguished clan, it would have been commented on by contemporaries. This is opposed to coming from one such as the Kipchaks, which had largely lost its prominence by Taydula's lifetime. Conversely, the historian Szilvia Kovács links her with the Khongirad clan, which traditionally enjoyed close marital ties with the family of Genghis Khan. Kovács suggests that Taydula's ethnic identity was not recorded due to having initially been a lesser wife to Öz Beg.

== Ibn Baṭṭūṭa's description ==
According to Ibn Baṭṭūṭa, who visited the court in 1332, Taydula Khatun was the senior wife of Öz Beg, and the mother of his sons Tini Beg and Jani Beg, but not of his daughter It Küchüjük (Īt Kūjūjūk), who was born to an already deceased previous senior wife of Öz Beg's. Taydula is said to have been her husband's favorite, and he spent most of his nights with her. A rumor attributed this devotion to Taydula's supposed ability to recover her virginity after each coupling. Another rumor claimed that Taydula was descended from King Solomon. Like the other wives of the khan, the principal wife is described as riding in a wagon drawn by silk-gilt-caparisoned horses, inside a tent being distinguished by a dome of silver, ornamented with gold or wood encrusted with gems, and attended by two ladies in waiting, six slave girls, and ten to fifteen pages. The khatun is distinguished by wearing the bughtāq headgear, a small crown decorated with jewels and surmounted by peacock feathers.

At his audience with Taydula Khatun, Ibn Baṭṭūṭa found her sitting amid ten elderly ladies in waiting, before a group of fifty young slavegirls cleaning gold and silver salvers filled with cherries. Taydula Khatun was engaged in the same activity. Greeted by Ibn Baṭṭūṭa and given a Quranic recitation by one of his companions, she treated them to kumis and offered a delicate wooden bowl filled with it to Ibn Baṭṭūṭa by her own hand as a mark of high favor. She proceeded to ask many questions about her visitors' journey, before they departed to visit with the khan's secondary wives Kabak Khātūn daughter of Naghatay, Bayalūn Khātūn daughter of the Byzantine emperor, Andronikos III Palaiologos, and Urdujā Khātūn daughter of ʿĪsā Beg, and with his daughter It Küchüjük, wife of the same ʿĪsā Beg. During a festival, Ibn Baṭṭūṭa describes Taydula Khatun sharing a cushion with her husband inside a large tent, surrounded by separately seated other royal wives and the khan's daughter and sons.

== Political role following the death of Öz Beg ==
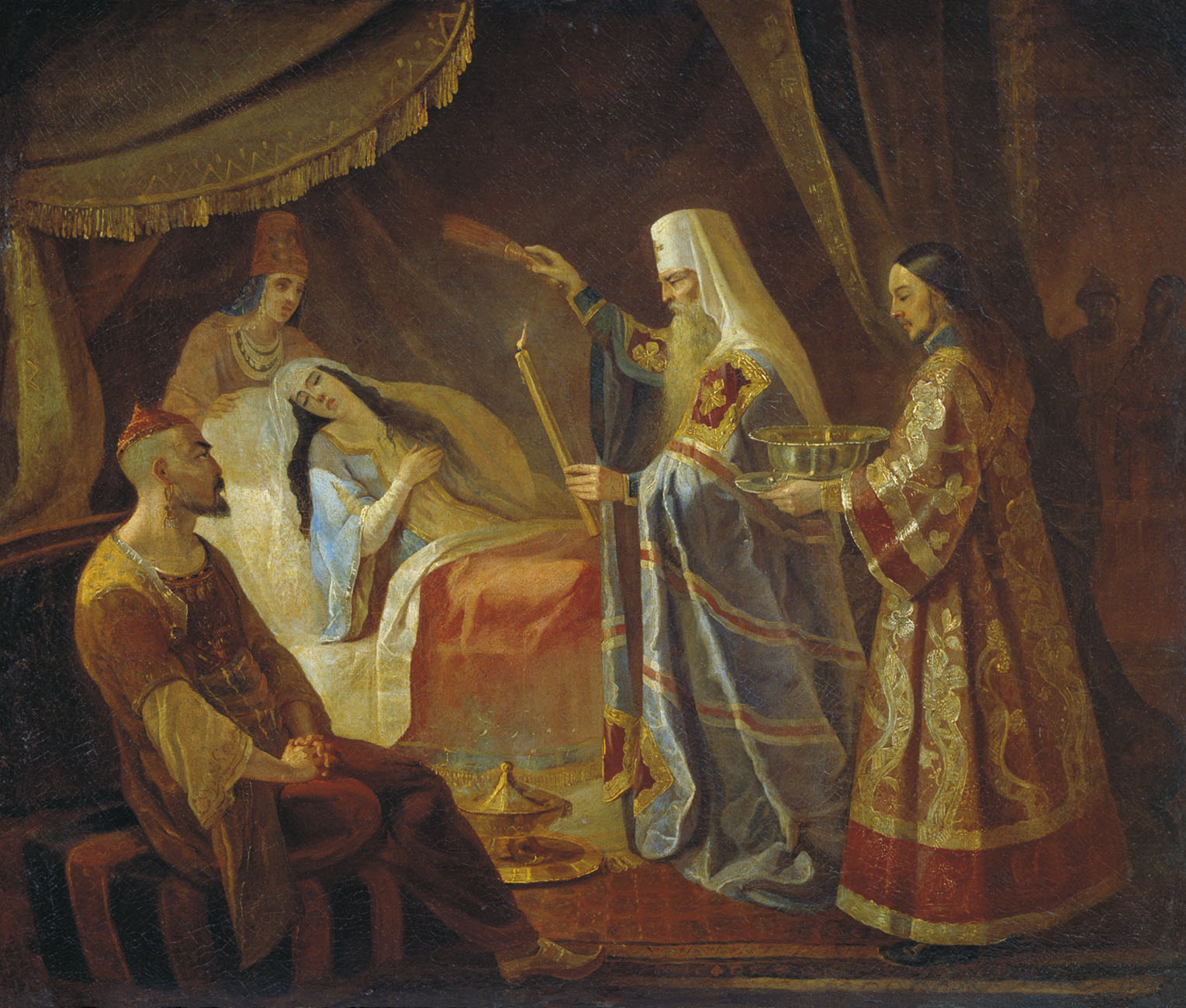
Metropolitan Aleksej heals Taydula, painting by Yakov Kapkov, 19th century

After Öz Beg's death in 1341, Taydula's position of influence only increased: already the chief wife of the former khan, the current khan's mother commanded even more respect, and enjoyed extensive financial power, apparently amplified by her grateful son. She had her own revenue based, for example, on the taxes paid by Italian merchants and other foreigners. She also intervened decisively in politics. When Öz Beg died, his eldest son and designated successor Tini Beg was absent from court, residing in the lands of the recently suppressed Ulus of Orda. Although he was duly recognized as khan, Taydula Khatun favored her younger son, Jani Beg, who perhaps acted as regent during his brother's absence, or had perhaps already been designated successor by their father himself. Jani Beg murdered one of his other brothers, Khiḑr Beg, for his ambitions. When Tini Beg was on his way back to court, perhaps fearing for Jani Beg, Taydula Khatun incited the emirs to murder Tini Beg, which they did at Saray-Jük in 1342. Jani Beg now became khan.

Taydula Khatun continued to exercise significant influence over Jani Beg, and her close cooperation with him led some foreign sources to conclude, erroneously, that she was his wife rather than his mother; there may also be some confusion between similarly named or titled royal women. She showed favor towards Christians and Christian institutions, and was already thanked for this by Pope Benedict XII in a letter dated 17 August 1340. She is also mentioned in a letter of the Venetian Doge Andrea Dandolo to Jani Beg Khan. Taydula also forbade the Russian princes from interfering with church justice, as shown in the diploma (yarlik) issued to John, the bishop of Sarai, in 1347.

When Jani Beg began to tax the Christian clergy to raise revenues for his campaigns, Taydula Khatun issued diplomas (yarliks) granting tax exemptions for the Russian metropolitans Feognost and Aleksej on 26 September 1347, 4 February 1351, and 11 February 1354, as well as two other diplomas in Latin for Catholic clergy, from 1358. The Russian metropolitans often visited her and received gifts. The Russian chroniclers referred to her as "patroness of the Russian Church". In 1357, Taydula Khatun suffered from blindness, and Metropolitan Aleksej was summoned to cure her with his prayers. After some difficulty, his prayers and a sprinkling with holy water resulted in an apparent miracle, as Taydula recovered her sight. According to another interpretation of events, Aleksej's patient was actually the Khan Jani Beg himself, while Taydula's blindness was a cover story to conceal it.

When the new khan, Taydula's grandson Berdi Beg, seemed determined to exterminate his male kin, Taydula attempted to intercede for them, according to the Timurid historian Muʿīn-ad-Dīn Naṭanzī (earlier known as the "Anonymous of Iskandar"). She hoped to arouse his pity by approaching him with his 8-month-old brother in her arms, but Berdi Beg seized the baby from her hands and killed it by hurling it to the ground. The anecdote is unverifiable, but the purge is confirmed in other sources. On the other hand, Taydula may have retained sufficient influence to ensure continued royal favor to the Russian metropolitan, Aleksej, and he was allowed to return home after Berdi Beg's accession. She also helped reach a compromise in the dispute between the Venetians and the Khan (inherited from Jani Beg's reign) over the Venetians' treatment of subjects of the Khan captured in the seizure of a Genoese galley.

The death of Berdi Beg in 1359 left his grandmother Taydula Khatun the senior royal in a court apparently without a suitable male heir, and the subsequent rapid succession of khans is blamed on her intrigues. According to Ötemiš-Ḥājjī, on the death of Berdi Beg, with the apparent extinction of the line of Batu Khan, son of Jochi, Taydula Khatun invited Khiḍr, a descendant of Shiban, son of Jochi, to take the throne. Pleased with her choice, Taydula proposed that Khiḍr marry her. However, when he was dissuaded from doing so by an adviser, she caused the emirs to expel him and he returned home across the Ural River. Taydula next placed on the throne the pretended Kildi Beg, apparently a mistake in this tradition for the Qulpa of the more primary sources, but he was not accepted as a genuine and legitimate ruler. Taydula finally settled on a certain Bazarchi, a descendant of Tangqut, son of Jochi, as khan and husband. This may be the same person as the Nawruz Beg of the more primary sources. Khiḍr, however, did not give up his ambitions and, supported by the vengeful son of an emir put to death by the new khan, gathered a force with which he marched on Sarai. In a battle before the city, he captured the khan and Taydula Khatun, and had them executed. Thus, in 1360, Khiḍr succeeded in becoming khan.

== Sources ==
- "Тайдула" . Brockhaus and Efron Encyclopedic Dictionary (in Russian). 1906.
- Doumenjou, M. F., and L. Geevers, "The Golden Horde, the Spanish Habsburg Monarchy, and the Construction of Ruling Dynasties," in: M. van Berkel and J. Duindam (eds.), Prince, Pen, and Sword: Eurasian Perspectives, Leiden, 2018.
- Favereau, Marie; Pochekaev, Roman Yu. (2023). "The Golden Horde, c. 1260–1502". The Cambridge History of the Mongol Empire. Cambridge University Press. pp. 243–318. ISBN 978-1-107-11648-1.
- Gaev, A. G., "Genealogija i hronologija Džučidov," Numizmatičeskij sbornik 3 (2002) 9-55.
- Gibb, H. A. R. (trans.), The Travels of Ibn Baṭṭūṭa A. D. 1325–1354. Vol. 2. Cambridge, 1962.
- Howorth, H. H., History of the Mongols from the 9th to the 19th century, Part II.1, London, 1880.
- Ivanics, Mária (2011). Die Frauen der Khane in der Goldenen Horde und in ihren Nachfolgestaaten. Chronica: Annual of the Institute of History (in German). Vol. 11. University of Szeged.
- Ivanics, Mária (2023). The Book of the Činggis Legend: A Critical Edition of a Seventeenth-century Volga-Turkī Source. Brill's Inner Asian Library. Vol. 44. BRILL.
- Judin, V. P., Utemiš-hadži, Čingiz-name, Alma-Ata, 1992.
- Kovacs, Szilvia (2020), Michal Biran; Jonathan Brack; Francesca Fiaschetti (eds.), "Taydula: A Golden Horde Queen and Patron of Christian Merchants", Along the Silk Roads in Mongol Eurasia, University of California Press
- Pelliot, P., Notes sur l'Histoire de la Horde d'Or, Paris, 1949.
- Počekaev, R. J., Cari ordynskie: Biografii hanov i pravitelej Zolotoj Ordy. Saint Petersburg, 2010.
- Safargaliev, M. G., Raspad Zolotoj Ordy. Saransk, 1960.
- Seleznëv, J. V., Èlita Zolotoj Ordy: Naučno-spravočnoe izdanie, Kazan', 2009.
- Spuler, B., Die Goldene Horde. Die Mongolen in Russland. 1223-1502, Leipzig, 1943.
- Tizengauzen, V. G. (trans.), Sbornik materialov otnosjaščihsja k istorii Zolotoj Ordy. Izvlečenija iz persidskih sočinenii, republished as Istorija Kazahstana v persidskih istočnikah. 4. Almaty, 2006.
- Vásáry, I., "Mongolian impact on the terminology of the documents of the Golden Horde," Acta Orientalia Academiae Scientiarum Hungaricae 48 (1995) 479–485.
- Vásáry, I., "The beginnings of coinage in the Blue Horde," Acta Orientalia Academiae Scientiarum Hungaricae 62 (2009) 371–385.
- Zimonyi, I., "Ibn Baṭṭūṭa on the First Wife of Özbeg Khan," Central Asiatic Journal 49 (2005) 303–309.
