= Timur Khwaja =

Khan of the Golden Horde in 1361

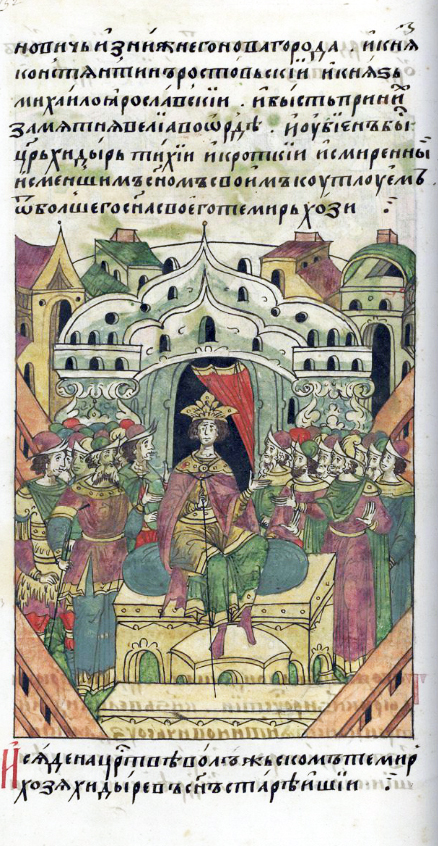
- Timur Khwaja enthroned, miniature from the Illustrated Chronicle of Ivan the Terrible

Khan of the Golden Horde Western Half (Blue Horde)
- Reign: 1361
- Predecessor: Khiḍr Khan
- Successor: Ordu Malik
- Died: August/September 1361
- Dynasty: Borjigin
- Father: Khiḍr Khan
- Religion: Islam

Timur Khwaja (Turki and Persian: تیمور خواجه; Kypchak: تمور خواجه; Scientific transliteration: Tīmūr Ḫwājah) was briefly Khan of the Golden Horde in 1361, having succeeded his father Khiḍr Khan.

== Life ==
The forceful Khiḍr Khan, a descendant of Jochi's son Shiban according to the Tawārīḫ-i guzīdah-i nuṣrat-nāmah, asserted himself as ruler of the Golden Horde in June 1360, having eliminated his rival Nawruz Beg. Nevertheless, the new khan's authority was limited by the presumable autonomy of the former beglerbeg Mamai Kiyat in the west, and the renewed autonomy of the former Ulus of Orda in the east, under the local Jochid khan Qara-Noqai. A greater threat proved to be the advance of another Jochid prince, Ordu Malik, on the capital Sarai in 1361. In circumstances that remain obscure, Khiḍr Khan and his son Qutlugh were now murdered by another son of Khiḍr Khan, Timur Khwaja, who seized the throne at Sarai, in August 1361. Timur Khwaja would reign for only a short time, possibly five weeks. Nevertheless, coins were minted in his name at Sarai and Mokhshi; the latter might have been Timur Khwaja's original base. He was opposed from the start by his uncle, Murād (or Murīd), who declared himself khan at Gülistan, by the advancing Ordu Malik, and possibly by Mamai in the west. In these circumstances, Timur Khwaja quickly lost control of Sarai and fled back east of the Volga before being killed. Unsurprisingly, he had accomplished little. He was succeeded at Sarai by the triumphant Ordu Malik. The murder of Khiḍr Khan by Timur Khwaja and the latter's brief and unsuccessful reign contributed to the deepening of the Golden Horde's political crisis, from which it would never completely recover.

The brevity and confusion of Timur Khwaja's reign are reflected in the minimal information preserved in the sources, as well as a great deal of variation as to the details. The above summary represents the most generally accepted version of the events, although there exist slightly different interpretations. The sources exhibit disagreements even over the name of Khiḍr Khan's parricide son, some of them apparently confusing him with Khiḍr Khan's brother Murād (or Murīd). The very unreliable but formerly historiographically influential Muʿīn-ad-Dīn Naṭanzī (earlier known as the "Anonymous of Iskandar") gives Timur Khoja impossibly as the son of Ordu Shaykh (i.e., Ordu Malik) and as the brother of Murīd, and gives the future khan ʿAzīz Shaykh as son of Timur Khwaja. Naṭanzī also attributes a reign of some two years to Timur Khwaja, and has him murdered, unrecognized, by the husband of a woman he assaulted. Given Naṭanzī's obvious errors, it is difficult to know how much of the remaining information he relates may be reliable. Even the Russian chronicles disagree as to whether it was the forces of Mamai or those of Ordu Malik that terminated Timur Khwaja's reign; moreover, the length of this brief reign also varies among different sources, from about a week to two weeks, to five weeks, ignoring Naṭanzī's impossible two years.

== Genealogy ==
- Genghis Khan
- Jochi
- Shiban
- Qadaq
- Töle Buqa
- Mangqutai
- Khiḍr Khan
- Timur Khwaja

== See also ==
- List of khans of the Golden Horde

== Sources ==
- Gaev, A. G., "Genealogija i hronologija Džučidov," Numizmatičeskij sbornik 3 (2002) 9-55.
- Grekov, B. D., and A. J. Jakubovskij, Zolotaja orda i eë padenie. Moscow, 1950.
- Grigoriev, A. P., "Zolotoordynskie hany 60-70-h godov XIV v.: hronologija pravlenii," Istriografija i istočnikovedenie stran Azii i Afriki 7 (1983) 9-54.
- Howorth, H. H., History of the Mongols from the 9th to the 19th Century. Part II.1. London, 1880.
- Judin, V. P., Utemiš-hadži, Čingiz-name, Alma-Ata, 1992.
- May, T., The Mongol Empire. Edinburgh, 2018.
- Nasonov, A. N., Mongoly i Rus', Moscow, 1940.
- Počekaev, R. J., Cari ordynskie: Biografii hanov i pravitelej Zolotoj Ordy. Saint Petersburg, 2010.
- Safargaliev, M. G., Raspad Zolotoj Ordy. Saransk, 1960.
- Thackston, W. M. (trans.), Khwandamir, Habibu's-siyar. Tome Three. Cambridge, MA, 1994.
- Tizengauzen, V. G. (trans.), Sbornik materialov otnosjaščihsja k istorii Zolotoj Ordy. Izvlečenija iz persidskih sočinenii, republished as Istorija Kazahstana v persidskih istočnikah. 4. Almaty, 2006.
- Vernadsky, G., The Mongols and Russia, New Haven, 1953.
- Vohidov, Š. H. (trans.), Istorija Kazahstana v persidskih istočnikah. 3. Muʿizz al-ansāb. Almaty, 2006.

Preceded by Khiḍr Khan	Khan of the Golden Horde; 1361	Succeeded by Ordu Malik
