= Nawruz Beg =

Khan of the Golden Horde in 1360

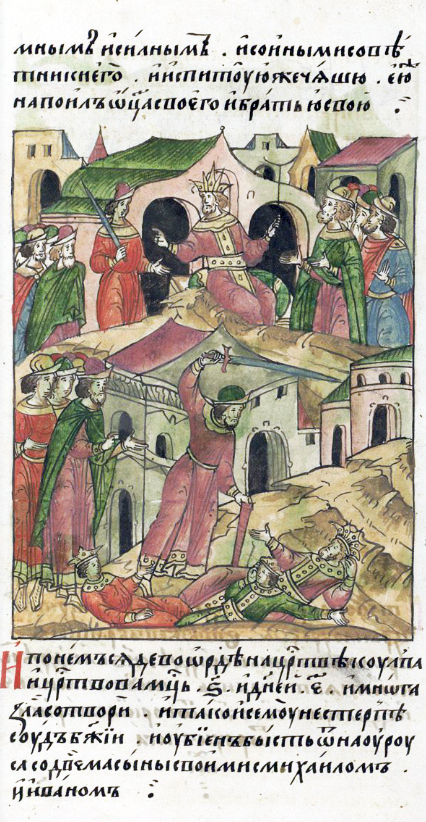
- Murder of Qulpa and his sons by Nawruz Beg, miniature from the Illustrated Chronicle of Ivan the Terrible (16th century)

Khan of the Golden Horde Western Half (Blue Horde)
- Reign: 1360
- Predecessor: Qulpa
- Successor: Khiḍr Khan
- Died: 1360
- Dynasty: Borjigin
- Religion: Islam

Nawruz Beg (Persian: محمد نوروز بیگ; Turki/Kypchak: نوروز بک; died 1360) was Khan of the Golden Horde in 1360.

== Reign ==
Nawruz Beg succeeded to the throne after the murder of his predecessor Qulpa and the latter's two sons, in February 1360. Nawruz Beg's antecedents are uncertain. Many modern authors simply repeat his claim to have been a son of Jani Beg, but the reputable medieval author Khwandamir explicitly indicates that Nawruz Beg was a pretended son of Jani Beg. A contemporary Venetian notary act claims that Nawruz Beg pretended to be a son of Öz Beg without any justification: "quam dici fuisse filium Usbech sine aliqua meritone." Similarly, the most accurate collections of Jochid genealogies (like the Muʿizz al-ansāb) do not include Nawruz Beg among Jani Beg's offspring (or anywhere else). Jani Beg's son Berdi Beg is said to have slaughtered no less than 12 of his closest kinsmen, including an 8-month-old brother, making it unlikely that Nawruz Beg could have been another son of Jani Beg. According to some scholars, the apparently identical roles attributed in the sources to Nawruz Beg and a certain Bazarchi (Bazarčī), a descendant of Jochi's son Tangqut (both consorts of Taydula Khatun, both eliminated by Khiḍr Khan), imply that Nawruz Beg and Bazarchi were in fact the same individual. Nawruz Beg had a son named Timur (Tīmūr); similarly, Bazarchi is given a son Timur Malik; neither of these has any relation to the famous Tamerlane.

Following the death of Ivan II of Moscow in November 1359, several Russian princes made their way to the Khan's court to seek investiture with the grand princely throne of Vladimir. Nawruz Beg awarded the diploma of investiture (yarliq) to Prince Andrey Konstantinovich of Nizhny Novgorod-Suzdal, who ceded it to his brother Dmitry of Suzdal.

Later in 1360, perhaps in June, Nawruz Beg was deposed and executed, along with his son Timur and Taydula Khatun, by a descendant of Jochi's son Shiban, Khiḍr.

Nawruz Beg's reign was part of the beginning of the Great Troubles during which over 25 khans followed each other in rapid succession on the throne of the Golden Horde in 20 years, many of them concurrent, and wielding little effective authority. Some of khans reigned only de jure, while supreme military rulers ruled de facto; Mamai being the most capable and famous of these.

== Genealogy ==
- Genghis Khan
- Jochi
- Batu Khan
- Toqoqan
- Mengu-Timur
- Toghrilcha
- Öz Beg
- Jani Beg
- (pretended) Nawruz Beg (claimed to be son of Öz Beg according to contemporary Venetian notary, or of Jani Beg according to eastern sources)

== See also ==
- List of khans of the Golden Horde

== Sources ==
- Gaev, A. G., "Genealogija i hronologija Džučidov," Numizmatičeskij sbornik 3 (2002) 9-55.
- Grekov, B. D., and A. J. Jakubovskij, Zolotaja orda i eë padenie. Moscow, 1950.
- Grigoriev, A. P., "Zolotoordynskie hany 60-70-h godov XIV v.: hronologija pravlenii," Istriografija i istočnikovedenie stran Azii i Afriki 7 (1983) 9-54.
- Howorth, H. H., History of the Mongols from the 9th to the 19th Century. Part II.1. London, 1880.
- Karpov, S. P., "Načalo smuty v Zolotoj Orde i perevorot Navruza," Zolotoordynskoe obozrenie 6 (2018) 528-536.
- May, T., The Mongol Empire. Edinburgh, 2018.
- Počekaev, R. J., Cari ordynskie: Biografii hanov i pravitelej Zolotoj Ordy. Saint Petersburg, 2010.
- Safargaliev, M. G., Raspad Zolotoj Ordy. Saransk, 1960.
- Thackston, W. M. (trans.), Khwandamir, Habibu's-siyar. Tome Three. Cambridge, MA, 1994.
- Vernadsky, G., The Mongols and Russia, New Haven, 1953.
- Vohidov, Š. H. (trans.), Istorija Kazahstana v persidskih istočnikah. 3. Muʿizz al-ansāb. Almaty, 2006.

Preceded by Qulpa	Khan of the Golden Horde; 1360	Succeeded by Khiḍr Khan
