= Murad (Golden Horde) =

Khan of the Golden Horde from 1361 to 1363

Murād Khan

Khan of the Golden Horde Western Half (Blue Horde)
- Reign: 1361–1363
- Predecessor: Timur Khwaja
- Successor: Pūlād Khwaja (Khayr Pūlād?)
- Died: September? 1363
- Dynasty: Borjigin
- Father: Mangqutai
- Religion: Islam

Murād Khan (Turki/Kypchak: مرید خان; Persian: مراد خان; called Amurat and Murut in Russian sources, and sometimes Murīd, Mürid, Burut, and Murdād in eastern sources) was Khan of at least part of the Golden Horde from 1361 to 1363.

== Origins ==
Murād, or more fully Ḥājjī Murād, was the brother of Khiḍr Khan, the son of Mangqutai, son of Töle Buqa, son of Qadaq, son of Shiban, son of Jochi, and originated from the Ulus of Shiban in the eastern part of the Golden Horde, according to the information of the Tawārīḫ-i guzīdah-i nuṣrat-nāmah. The variant ancestry supplied by some other sources is now considered inaccurate, for example the assertion of Muʿīn-ad-Dīn Naṭanzī (earlier known as the "Anonymous of Iskandar") that Murīd (i.e., Murād) was the son of Orda Shaykh (i.e., Ordu Malik), or Khwandamir, Ötemiš-Ḥājjjī, and one Russian chronicle, making Murād (whom they call Murdād, Burut, and Murut, respectively) the parricide son of Khiḍr Khan.

== Rise to power ==
Murād's brother Khiḍr Khan made himself ruler of the Golden Horde in 1360. Threatened by the advance of a competitor, Ordu Malik, Khiḍr Khan was murdered by his own son Timur Khwaja in 1361. Murād might have claimed the throne in opposition to his parricide nephew, but it was Timur Khwaja who took over at the capital Sarai. However, the uncle and nephew were both threatened by the continued advance of Ordu Malik from the east, and of Mamai from the west. Timur Khwaja was expelled and killed after several weeks on the throne, while Ordu Malik seized Sarai, only to hold it for about a month, before he was killed and succeeded by the pretended Kildi Beg, still in 1361. At some point during these developments, Murād established himself as khan at Gülistan (Tsarevskoe gorodishche just northwest of Tsarev). This appears to have remained the base of his authority, and it was from here that he issued his coinage. In August or September 1362, Murād fought a battle against Kildi Beg and emerged victorious, and his rival was killed. Before Murād could take over Sarai, however, the city was seized by Mamai and his puppet khan ʿAbdallāh. Subsequent events are confused, but it seems Murād expelled ʿAbdallāh from Sarai in Mamai's absence, only to lose the city immediately to another Jochid prince, Khayr-Pūlād (or Mīr-Pūlād). While the latter retained Sarai, the rest of the Golden Horde was divided between Murād and ʿAbdallāh, and both courts sought to win the loyalty and tribute of the vassal Russian princes. Desperate for revenue, Murād granted the diploma of investiture (yarlik) with the Grand Principality of Vladimir to the 11-year-old Dmitry Ivanovich of Moscow in 1362, However, Mamai induced Dmitrij of Moscow and his regent, Metropolitan Aleksey, to recognize Mamai's protégé ʿAbdallāh as suzerain in 1363. When this happened, Murād granted the investiture with the Grand Principality of Vladimir to Dmitry Konstantinovich of Suzdal instead. But the Muscovites forced Dmitry of Suzdal to come to terms and renounce his claims. Murād did not have a chance to retaliate, before he died in the winter of 1363.

== Death ==
According to the often unreliable Muʿīn-ad-Dīn Naṭanzī, Murād's beglerbeg was Ilyās, the son of the former beglerbeg Mogul Buqa, who had perished due to the machinations of Kildi Beg. Murād was enamored of Ilyās' son, and determined to kill the father and promote the son in his place. When Murād shared this design with his wife in secret, she betrayed it to Ilyās, who preempted the khan and killed him. Murād's death is dated to the winter of 1363–1364. What happened at Murād's court at Gülistan after his death is not entirely clear: he may have been succeeded by a certain Pūlād Khwaja (perhaps the same as Khayr Pūlād), possibly a distant cousin and fellow descendant of Shiban, son of Jochi, but his first coins are dated to late 1364; by 1365, Pūlād Khwaja had been succeeded by ʿAzīz Shaykh, also apparently a distant cousin of Murād's as a fellow descendant of Shiban, son of Jochi.

== Genealogy ==
- Genghis Khan
- Jochi
- Shiban
- Qadaq
- Töle Buqa
- Mangqutai
- Murād Khan

== See also ==
- List of khans of the Golden Horde

Preceded by Timur Khwaja	Khan of the Golden Horde; 1361–1363 (in competition with Ordu Malik, Kildi Beg, ʿAbdallāh, Khayr-Pūlād)	Succeeded by Pūlād Khwaja (Khayr Pūlād?)
