= Ordu Malik =

Khan of the Golden Horde in 1361

Khan of the Golden Horde Western Half (Blue Horde)
- Reign: 1361
- Predecessor: Timur Khwaja
- Successor: Kildi Beg
- Died: September/October 1361
- Dynasty: Borjigin
- Father: Īl-Tutar?
- Religion: Islam

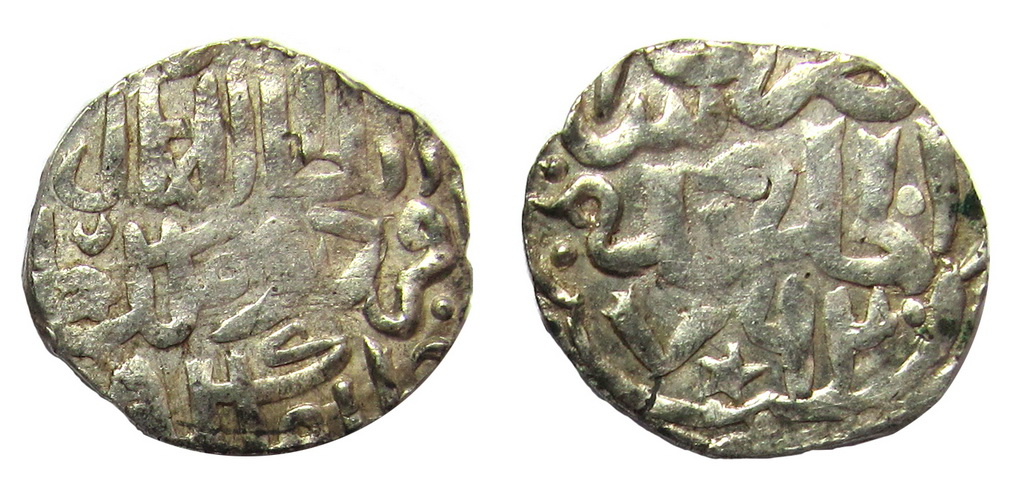
Dang Ordu Malik, minted in the city of Saray al-Jadid, 762 AH. Found in 2010 in the Voronezh region.

Ordu Malik (Turki/Kypchak and Persian: اوردو ملک; Ardemelik in Russian chronicles; also called Ordu Shaykh (اوردو شیخ) by Naṭanzī) was briefly Khan of the Golden Horde in 1361, having replaced his rival Timur Khwaja.

== Career ==
Ordu Malik appeared on the historical scene in 1361, as a rival of Khiḍr Khan for possession of the throne of the Golden Horde and its capital Sarai. During Ordu Malik's advance on the city, Khiḍr Khan was murdered by his own son, Timur Khwaja, who seized the throne, but reigned only briefly, for one to five weeks. In the end, Timur Khwaja was forced to flee and was killed, while Ordu Malik was enthroned as khan at Sarai. Ordu Malik minted coins at Sarai and Azaq, but evidently failed to assert his control over the entirety of the Golden Horde. The territory under the former beglerbeg Mamai Kiyat in the west, and Gülistan, where Khiḍr Khan's brother Murād (or Mürid) had declared himself khan, were apparently beyond Ordu Malik's authority. Ordu Malik maintained himself on the throne for only about a month, during September 1361, before being killed and succeeded by Kildi Beg. According to Muʿīn-ad-Dīn Naṭanzī, Ordu Malik had been sent to take over Sarai and the Ulus of Batu by his brother, the ruler of the Ulus of Orda in Sighnaq, who had refused the throne of Sarai himself. Subsequently, Ordu Malik was stabbed to death during the night by a discontented servant, who was outraged that a prince of the Ulus of Orda should be ruler of the Ulus of Batu; several of Ordu Malik's emirs were slaughtered the following morning.

== Genealogy ==
With one exception, the antecedents of Ordu Malik are nowhere stated explicitly, and have been subject to much disagreement among scholars. The exception comes from the aforementioned very unreliable but historiographically influential account of Muʿīn-ad-Dīn Naṭanzī (earlier known as the "Anonymous of Iskandar"), who gives Ordu Malik (whom he calls Ordu Shaykh) as brother of Chimtay and son of Erzen, son of Sasibuqa, son of Noqai. Especially given Naṭanzī's notion that Chimtay was ruler of the Ulus of Orda in Sighnaq, modern scholars have identified his Sasibuqa with a like-named son of Bayan, son of Qoyunchi, son of Sariqtay, son of Orda. However, this solution is artificial and dubious, and the accuracy of Naṭanzī's account is suspect, in part because the former Ulus of Orda seems to have been suppressed and subjugated by the khans of the Golden Horde in c. 1329–1360, and entrusted to governors from the Kiyat clan, the kinsmen of the future beglerbeg Mamai. Naṭanzī's other information about Ordu Malik also does not inspire confidence, especially as he identifies him as father of his aforementioned rivals Timur Khwaja and Murād.

There are various alternatives for Ordu Malik's origins, based on circumstantial considerations. Among other possibilities, if Naṭanzī's association of Ordu Shaykh (i.e., Ordu Malik) with the Ulus of Orda has any historical merit, it is conceivable that he was the brother of Qara-Noqai, who restored the autonomy of this ulus as local khan in 1360, and who was the son of a certain Sasi, a descendant of Jochi's son Tuqa-Timur. A garbled version of this may lie behind Naṭanzī's presentation of Ordu Shaykh as son of Erzen, son of Sasibuqa, son of Noqai. Given the other errors in Naṭanzī, it is unclear whether any of his information should be credited here. At any rate, the most extensive genealogical compendiums, the Muʿizz al-ansāb and Tawārīḫ-i guzīdah-i nuṣrat-nāmah, do not include anyone identifiable with Ordu Malik in listing the close relations of Qara-Noqai (Nūqāy, son of Sāsī, son of Tūqānčar, son of Bāy-Tīmūr, son of Tūqā-Tīmūr, son of Jochi). The only prince actually named Ordu Malik (Ūrdū-Malik) in the genealogical compendiums is another descendant of Tuqa-Timur: Ūrdū-Malik, son of Īl-Tūtār, son of Dānišmand, son of Bāyān, son of Tūqā-Tīmūr, son of Jochi. He is a very plausible match for Khan Ordu Malik, although the chronological implications of a controversial proposed identification of his first cousin Ṣūfī with the Beg Ṣūfī who ruled in the Crimea in 1419-1421 have been used to argue against this. If this identification of Ordu Malik is correct, he had a daughter, Turkān, and a son, Qutluq, father of Ibāj, father of Tawakkul; none of these are known to have played a significant historical role.

Identifying Ordu Malik among the descendants of Jochi's son Tuqa-Timur helps make sense of the fierce rivalry between him and the family of Khiḍr Khan, descendants of Jochi's son Shiban; neither line had a tradition of occupying the throne of the Golden Horde, and both may have hoped to stake their claim on the extinction of the line of its traditional occupants, the line of Jochi's son Batu.

=== Genealogical tree ===
- Genghis Khan
- Jochi
- Tuqa-Timur
- Bayan
- Danishmand
- Il-Tutar
- Ordu Malik

(as identified by Gaev 2002)

== See also ==
- List of khans of the Golden Horde

== Sources ==
- Gaev, A. G., "Genealogija i hronologija Džučidov," Numizmatičeskij sbornik 3 (2002) 9-55.
- Grekov, B. D., and A. J. Jakubovskij, Zolotaja orda i eë padenie. Moscow, 1950.
- Grigor'ev, A. P., "Zolotoordynskie hany 60-70-h godov XIV v.: hronologija pravlenii," Istriografija i istočnikovedenie stran Azii i Afriki 7 (1983) 9-54.
- Howorth, H. H., History of the Mongols from the 9th to the 19th Century. Part II.1. London, 1880.
- Judin, V. P., Utemiš-hadži, Čingiz-name, Alma-Ata, 1992.
- May, T., The Mongol Empire. Edinburgh, 2018.
- Mladjov, I., "Mongol Rulers of the Western Steppes (Qipčāq)," University of Michigan, 2019.
- Nasonov, A. N., Mongoly i Rus', Moscow, 1940.
- Počekaev, R. J., Cari ordynskie: Biografii hanov i pravitelej Zolotoj Ordy. Saint Petersburg, 2010.
- Sabitov, Ž. M., Genealogija "Tore", Astana, 2008.
- Sabitov, Ž. M., "K voprosu o genalogii zolotoordynskogo hana Bek-Sufi," in Krim: vìd antičnostì do s'ogodennja, Kiev, 2014, 63–74.
- Safargaliev, M. G., Raspad Zolotoj Ordy. Saransk, 1960.
- Sagdeeva, R. Z., Serebrjannye monety hanov Zolotoj Ordy, Moscow, 2005.
- Thackston, W. M. (trans.), Khwandamir, Habibu's-siyar. Tome Three. Cambridge, MA, 1994.
- Tizengauzen, V. G. (trans.), Sbornik materialov otnosjaščihsja k istorii Zolotoj Ordy. Izvlečenija iz persidskih sočinenii, republished as Istorija Kazahstana v persidskih istočnikah. 4. Almaty, 2006.
- Vernadsky, G., The Mongols and Russia, New Haven, 1953.
- Vohidov, Š. H. (trans.), Istorija Kazahstana v persidskih istočnikah. 3. Muʿizz al-ansāb. Almaty, 2006.

Preceded by Timur Khwaja	Khan of the Golden Horde; 1361	Succeeded by Kildi Beg
