= Jani Beg =

Khan of the Golden Horde from 1342 to 1357

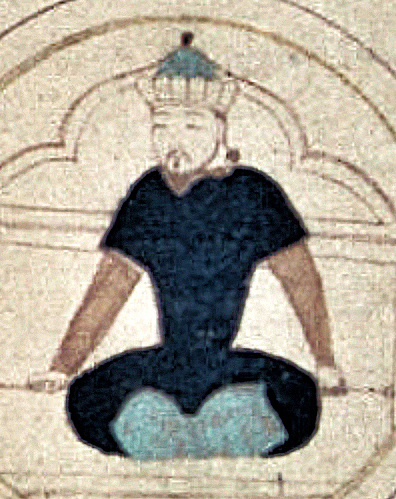
- Jani Beg Khan enthroned. Timurid genealogy 1405–1409 (Topkapi Sarayi Müzesi, H2152, f.38b)

Khan of the Golden Horde Western Half (Blue Horde)
- Reign: 1342–1357
- Predecessor: Tini Beg
- Successor: Berdi Beg
- Died: 1357; Sarai
- Issue more...: Berdi Beg
- House: Borjigin
- Dynasty: Golden Horde
- Father: Öz Beg Khan
- Mother: Taydula Khatun
- Religion: Islam

Jani Beg (Persian: جانی بیگ, Turki/Kypchak: جانی بک; died 1357), also known as Janibek Khan, was Khan of the Golden Horde from 1342 until his death in 1357. After his father, Öz Beg Khan, died in 1341, Jani Beg defeated his older brother, Tini Beg, to become khan.

== Reign ==
After his father Öz Beg died in 1341, Jani Beg's older brother and rival Tini Beg was in the east, possibly preparing for an attack. As soon as Tini Beg entered the central lands, he was killed by the followers of Jani Beg. Khiḍr Beg, a younger brother, was also killed on his orders. Jani Beg was elected as khan in 1342 by the kurultai with the support of his mother Taydula Khatun.

Jani Beg is known to have actively interfered in the affairs of the Russian principalities and Lithuania. Like his father, Jani Beg supported the house of Moscow and its heads, Simeon and Ivan II. Relations between the Russian principalities were generally peaceful, with Jani Beg only permitting one small-scale operation against Ryazan; however, he interfered in Moscow's relations with Suzdal, supported anti-Muscovite elements in Ryazan, and contributed to Tver's fragmentation. He also allowed those principalities to grow increasingly independent, to the point that their rulers began calling themselves grand princes – a title that had been reserved to only the ruler of Vladimir. (Note: This has been a point of contention among historians, with Anton Gorsky arguing that Nizhny Novgorod and Tver were only able to claim the status of grand principality in the 1360s.) The Russian chroniclers referred to him as "the good tsar".

Jani Beg also confirmed the yarlik to the Venetians at the start of his reign. However, in September 1343, a Venetian noble named Andreolo Civran killed a Mongol official in Tanais, which led to Jani Beg expelling all the Latins from the Italian colonies. The Venetian senate condemned Civran and sent envoys to negotiate with Jani Beg, but Jani Beg demanded that Civran be judged by a Mongol court. The Genoese and Venetians formed a temporary alliance and imposed a trade embargo, while Jani Beg responded by sending more troops to the Genoese colony of Kaffa in Crimea.

The siege of Kaffa lasted three years, with high losses on both sides. The inhabitants survived the siege as boats carried supplies through the harbor. According to an Italian source, there was an outbreak of plague among Jani Beg's troops, who then catapulted infected corpses into Kaffa in an attempt to weaken the defenders. This is allegedly how the Black Death spread to Europe; infected Genoese sailors subsequently sailed from Kaffa to Genoa, Messina, and Constantinople. The story involving the catapult has been disputed; it is originally based on Gabriel de Mussis of Piacenza in Italy, who wrote about the plague in 1348. It is more likely that rats carrying plague-infested fleas went from the Jani Beg's camp to the city and thereby infected the Genoese.

In 1342, Jani Beg temporarily imposed a tax on the Russian Church at the instigation of a Russian prince who harbored resentment toward the church due to its significant wealth and reputation. By that time, the Golden Horde's treasury had drained because of natural disasters and warfare; however, Jani Beg restored the tax exempt status of the church in September 1347 and reconfirmed it in 1351, returning to the religious policy of Genghis Khan. Despite the incident, Jani Beg continued to protect the Russian Church. Following the death of Simeon of Moscow in 1353, Jani Beg sided with Simeon's younger brother, Ivan II, when the throne of Vladimir was contested by the prince of Nizhny Novgorod-Suzdal. As a result, Jani Beg managed to maintain the balance of power among the principalities and prevent war from breaking out over the succession. The princes of Moscow were considered loyal and Jani Beg viewed Moscow as the best counterbalance to the growing power of Lithuania.

In the winter of 1356–1357, Jani Beg attacked the region of Azerbaijan in Iran and conquered the city of Tabriz, installing his own governor. The Ilkhanate was politically fragmented and the region was under the control of Malek Ashraf, but Jani Beg was able to secure the support of the Shirvanshah, and his army of 300,000 was able to easily take the region. To celebrate his victory, Jani Beg had coins minted in the city. He also asserted Jochid dominance over the Chagatai Khanate, but as soon as the Jochid armies left, the governor of Tabriz declared independence and was soon killed by the Muzaffarid ruler Mubariz al-Din Muhammad, who then withdrew from the region as he could not hold it. This resulted in the Jalayirids annexing the region.

Following his conquests, Berdi Beg returned to Sarai in 1357, but on the way, he fell ill and died. Persian sources say either Berdi Beg or the beys were responsible for his death due to Jani Beg being too old, while the Nikon Chronicle, a later Russian source, says that the beys strangled him to death. Jani Beg's contemporaries suspected that he was killed on the order of Berdi Beg, but the exact cause of death is unknown due to the lack of direct sources.

== Legacy ==
The Chudov Monastery in Moscow, founded at about the time of Jani Beg's fall by Metropolitan Aleksii and Sergii of Radonezh, was built on land that according to legend was granted to Aleksii by the Khan as thanks for the miraculous curing of his mother Taydula by the former.

Jani Beg maintained his father's policy of centralization, which allowed him to integrate the old territories of Orda Khan back into the Golden Horde; however, the Blue Horde never submitted to his rule, especially after a major revolt in 1342. Although Jani Beg maintained peace with the Russian princes, his conflict with the Latins had negative consequences for the Golden Horde's trade economy, including a shortage of metal—particularly silver—which led to a decline in minting. It was not until after Jani Beg's death in 1358 that a new agreement was signed with the Venetians, which allowed them to return to Tanais. The economic decline also coincided with the Black Death.

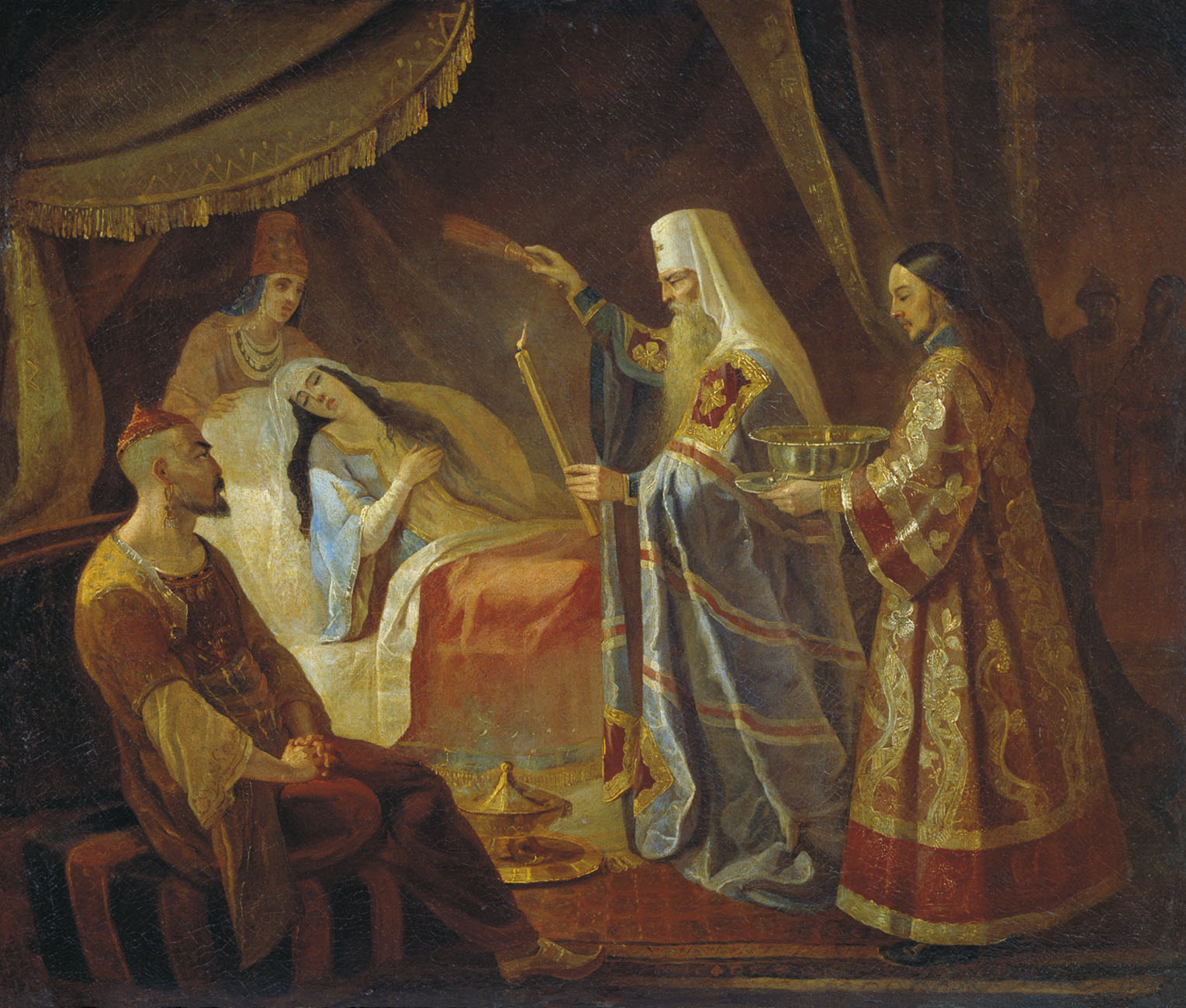
Metropolitan Alexis Healing the Tatar Queen Taidula from Blindness while Janibeg Looks on, Yakov Kapkov (1816–54)

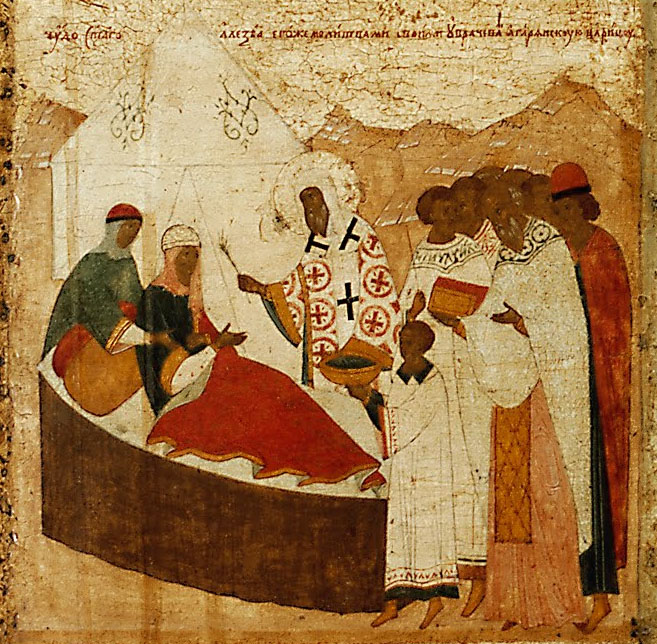
Metropolitan Alexis healing Jani Beg's mother from blindness (detail from a 15th- or 16th-century painting by Dionisius)

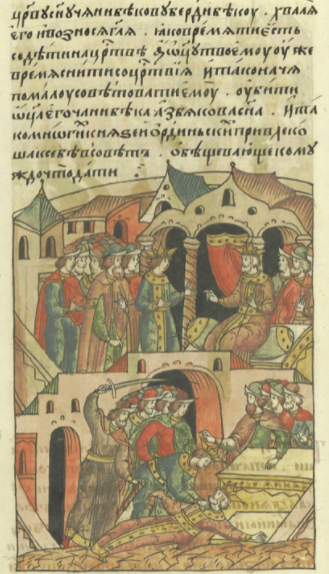
The murder of Jani Beg by Berdi Beg (miniature from a volume of the Illustrated Chronicle of Ivan the Terrible)

=== Catalan Atlas (1375) ===
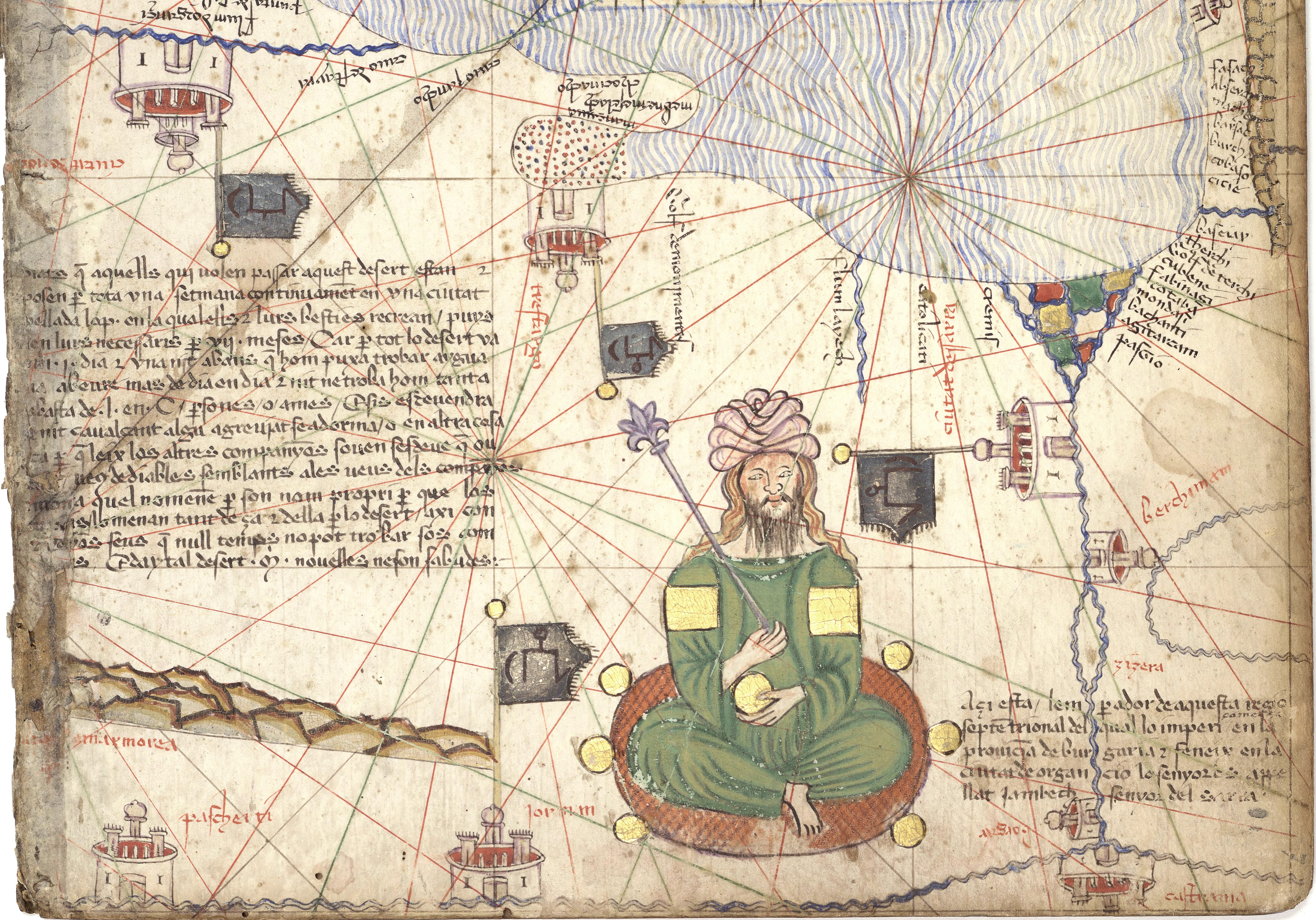
Jani Beg of the Golden Horde, as depicted in the Catalan Atlas (1375), with the flag of the Golden Horde:.

Jani Beg appears in the 1375 Catalan Atlas: the Mongol polity of the Golden Horde is accurately depicted north of the Caspian Sea. Jani Beg has been identified in this representation, being mentioned as "Jambech senyor de Sarra", and the flag of the Golden Horde also appears. The caption to the right of his depiction reads:

Here resides the emperor of this northern region whose empire starts in the province of Bulgaria and ends at the city of Organcio. The sovereign is named Jambech, Lord of the Sarra.

The symbolism of the Golden Horde flag depicted by the Catalan Atlas is fairly similar to the type of tamgha symbols (such as) actually found on the coinage of the Golden Horde. Such symbols were used until the time of Jani Beg, but essentially disappear thereafter.

== Family ==
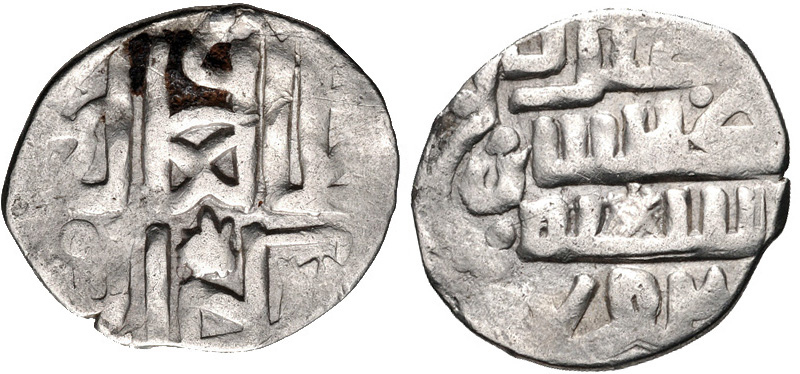
Coin of Jani Beg, New Serai mint. Dated AH 748 (1347–8 CE)

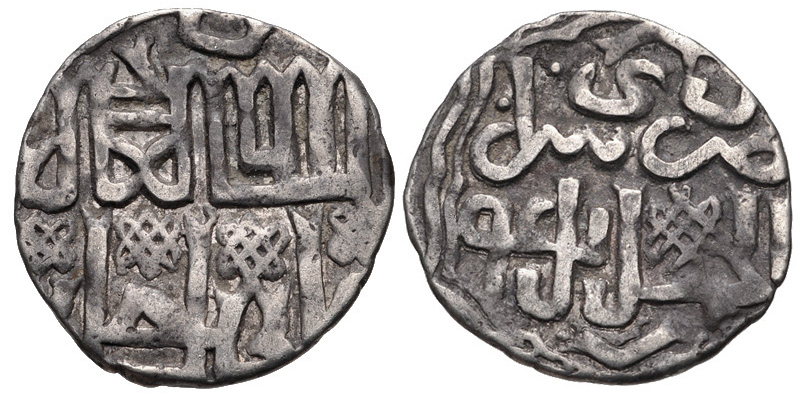
Coin of Jani Beg, Gulistan mint. Dated AH 753 (1352–3 CE)

Jani Beg had a number of sons, only one of whom, Berdi Beg, reigned after him but who proceeded to eliminate his brothers. Two or three more khans appear to have claimed to be Jani Beg's sons and are sometimes treated as such by modern scholars.

- Berdi Beg (r. 1357–1359)
- (pretended?) Qulpa (r. 1359–1360)
- (pretended?) Nawruz Beg (r. 1360)
- (pretended?) Kildi Beg (r. 1361–1362)
- a daughter, Shakar Beg, married Aq Sufi Qongirat, the prince of the Sufi dynasty of Khwarezm. Their daughter Khanzada Begum later married into the Timurid dynasty.

== Genealogy ==
- Genghis Khan
  - Jochi
    - Batu Khan
      - Toqoqan
        - Mengu-Timur
          - Toghrilcha
            - Uzbeg Khan
              - Jani Beg

== In popular culture ==
The 2012 Russian film The Horde is set during the reign of Jani Beg and is a highly fictionalised narrative of how Aleksii healed Taidula from blindness.

== See also ==
- List of khans of the Golden Horde

== Bibliography ==
- "Чанибек" . Brockhaus and Efron Encyclopedic Dictionary (in Russian). 1906.
- Buell, Paul D.; Fiaschetti, Francesca (2018). Historical Dictionary of the Mongol World Empire (2nd ed.). Lanham: Rowman & Littlefield. ISBN 978-1-5381-1137-6.
- Favereau, Marie; Pochekaev, Roman Yu. (2023). "The Golden Horde, c. 1260–1502". The Cambridge History of the Mongol Empire. Cambridge University Press. pp. 243–318. ISBN 978-1-107-11648-1.
- Fennell, John (15 November 2023). The Emergence of Moscow, 1304–1359. Univ of California Press. ISBN 978-0-520-34759-5.

Preceded by Tini Beg	Khan of the Blue Horde and Golden Horde; 1342–1357	Succeeded by Berdi Beg
