= Tini Beg =

Khan of the Golden Horde from 1341 to 1342

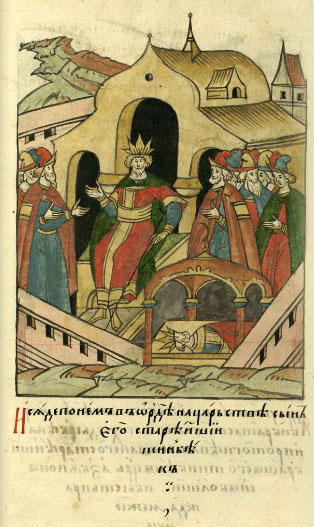
- Tinibeg as depicted in the Illustrated Chronicle of Ivan the Terrible (16th century)

Khan of the Golden Horde Western Half (Blue Horde)
- Reign: 1341–1342
- Predecessor: Öz Beg Khan
- Successor: Jani Beg
- Died: 1342; Sarai
- House: Borjigin
- Dynasty: Golden Horde
- Father: Öz Beg Khan
- Mother: Taydula Khatun
- Religion: Islam

Tini Beg (Turki/Kypchak: تینی بک; died 1342), also known as Dinibeg or Tinibek, was Khan of the Golden Horde from 1341 to 1342. He lost the throne to his younger brother Jani Beg.

== Biography ==
He was born to Öz Beg Khan and his principal wife Taydula Khatun. He was appointed as governor of White Horde in c. 1328. Muslim sources such as Ibn Battuta claimed that he was the most favored son of Öz Beg and was designated his heir. He became the expected heir after his elder brother Timur Beg's death in 1330. The poet Qutb translated Nizami's "Khosrow and Shirin" for Tini Beg and his wife Malika Khatun. During his reign, Volhynia was lost to the Grand Duchy of Lithuania. Tini Beg was away, fighting against Chagatai raiders on the eastern border or White Horde of Jochid ulus, when his father Öz Beg died in 1341. Tini Beg's younger brother Jani Beg served as regent, aided by their mother Taydula Khatun. When Taydula heard that Tini Beg was on his way back to the court in 1342, fearing for Jani Beg, she incited the emirs to kill Tini Beg, at Saray-Jük. Jani Beg succeeded him as khan in 1342, when the kurultai elected him. Khiḍr Beg, a younger brother, was also killed on the orders of Jani Beg.

=== Legacy ===
Tini Beg was remembered as a more suitable man for the throne by Ibn Battuta. He was considered pro-Christian and received some letters from Pope Benedict XII, who encouraged him to convert to Christianity.

=== Marriage ===
He had at least two wives:

- Jamila Malika Khatun
- Anushirwan Khatun (m. 1330/1) — daughter of Shaikh Ali Jalayir, brother of Hasan Buzurg

== In popular culture ==
- He is played by the Russian actor Andrei Panin in the 2012 film The Horde

== Genealogy ==
- Genghis Khan
- Jochi
- Batu Khan
- Toqoqan
- Mengu-Timur
- Togrilcha
- Uzbeg Khan
- Tini Beg

== See also ==
- List of khans of the Golden Horde

== Sources ==
- David Morgan, The Mongols
- Favereau, Marie; Pochekaev, Roman Yu. (2023). "The Golden Horde, c. 1260–1502". The Cambridge History of the Mongol Empire. Cambridge University Press. pp. 243–318. ISBN 978-1-107-11648-1.

Preceded by Ozbeg	Khan of the Golden Horde; 1341–1342	Succeeded by Janibeg
