= Qulpa =

Khan of the Golden Horde from 1359 to 1360

Qulpa Askulpa
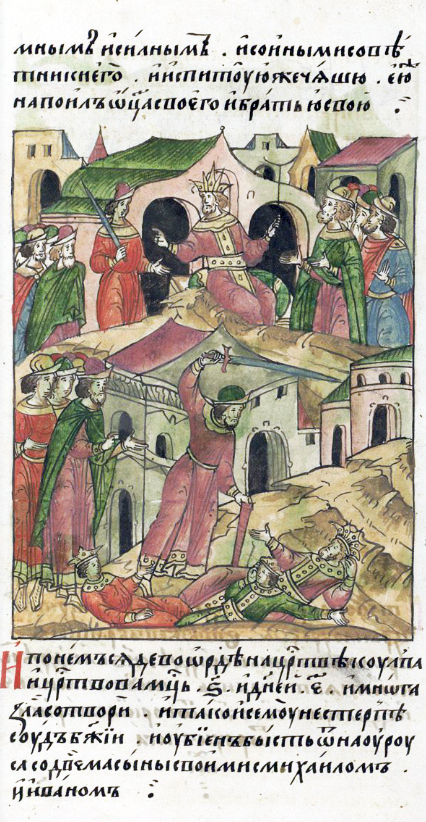
- Murder of Qulpa, miniature from the Illustrated Chronicle of Ivan the Terrible

Khan of the Golden Horde Western Half (Blue Horde)
- Reign: August 1359–February 1360
- Predecessor: Berdi Beg
- Successor: Nawruz Beg
- Died: 28 February 1360
- Dynasty: Borjigin
- Religion: Islam

Qulpa (Note: Turki/Kypchak: قلنا خان; Kulpa and Askulpa in Russian chronicles; Colbadinus Cam in a contemporary Venetian document.) (died 1360) was Khan of the Golden Horde from August 1359 to February 1360.

== Reign ==
He came to the throne four days after the murder of his predecessor Berdi Beg. It has been supposed that Qulpa might have begun his reign as a rival khan at Azov, but that cannot be verified and seems unlikely. His short reign is not recorded in most of the Persian and Arabic narratives treating the khans of the Golden Horde, but it is briefly treated in the Russian chronicles, which report that Qulpa reigned for 6 months and 5 days, did a lot of evil, and in the end was killed, together with his sons Mihail and Ivan. The names of Qulpa's sons and the absence of a traditional Muslim name on his coins suggest that he might have been Christian, but that is not certain. The publication of a contemporary Venetian notary act by Benedetto Bianco confirms Qulpa's favor towards Christians and that at least his eldest, 12-year-old son was a Christian; it also dates the murders of Qulpa, his two sons, and two emirs, and the accession of the next khan, Nawruz Beg, to 28 February 1360. Qulpa's control over the Golden Horde may have been challenged from the start, by Berdi Beg's son-in-law Mamai in the west, and by the reassertion of autonomy in the former subordinate Ulus of Orda in the east, under Qara Noqai, a descendant of Jochi's son Toqai Temür.

The antecedents of Qulpa are unclear. He may have been among those claiming descent from Jani Beg (like Nawruz Beg and Kildi Beg), and some modern authorities treat him as a son of Jani Beg and brother of his predecessor Berdi Beg and successor Nawruz Beg. The most accurate collections of Jochid genealogies (like the Muʿizz al-ansāb) do not include Qulpa/Qulna among Jani Beg's offspring, or anywhere else. Jani Beg's son Berdi Beg is said to have slaughtered no less than 12 of his closest kinsmen, including an 8-month-old brother, making it unlikely that Qulpa/Qulna could have been another son of Jani Beg. To some scholars, the evidence of eastern sources (mostly enumerations of the khans) implies that Qulpa was identical to Kildi Beg, who pretended to be a son of Jani Beg (but was actually his nephew, according to the Muʿizz al-ansāb); the chronological implications of such an identification are problematic, but the more detailed treatment in Ötemiš-Ḥājjī's Čingīz-Nāmah makes it likely that Qulpa was at least confounded with Kildi Beg in an influential tradition.

== Genealogy ==
- Genghis Khan
- Jochi
- Batu Khan
- Toqoqan
- Mengu-Timur
- Toghrilcha
- Uzbeg Khan
- Jani Beg
- (pretended?) Qulpa

== See also ==
- List of khans of the Golden Horde

== Sources ==
- Grekov, B. D., and A. J. Jakubovskij, Zolotaja orda i eë padenie. Moscow, 1950.
- Grigor'ev, A. P., "Zolotoordynskie hany 60-70-h godov XIV v.: hronologija pravlenii," Istriografija i istočnikovedenie stran Azii i Afriki 7 (1983) 9-54.
- Howorth, H. H., History of the Mongols from the 9th to the 19th Century. Part II.1. London, 1880.
- Judin, V. P., Utemiš-hadži, Čingiz-name, Alma-Ata, 1992.
- Karpov, S. P., "Načalo smuty v Zolotoj Orde i perevorot Navruza," Zolotoordynskoe obozrenie 6 (2018) 528-536.
- May, T., The Mongol Empire. Edinburgh, 2018.
- Počekaev, R. J., Cari ordynskie: Biografii hanov i pravitelej Zolotoj Ordy. Saint Petersburg, 2010.
- Safargaliev, M. G., Raspad Zolotoj Ordy. Saransk, 1960.
- Sidorenko, V. A., "Hronologija pravlenii zolotoordynskih hanov 1357-1380 gg.," Materialov po arheologii, istorii i ètnografii Tavrii 7 (2000) 267-288.
- Thackston, W. M. (trans.), Khwandamir, Habibu's-siyar. Tome Three. Cambridge, MA, 1994.
- Vernadsky, G., The Mongols and Russia, New Haven, 1953.

Preceded by Berdi Beg	Khan of the Golden Horde; 1359–1360	Succeeded by Nawruz Beg
