= Berdi Beg =

Khan of the Golden Horde from 1357 to 1359

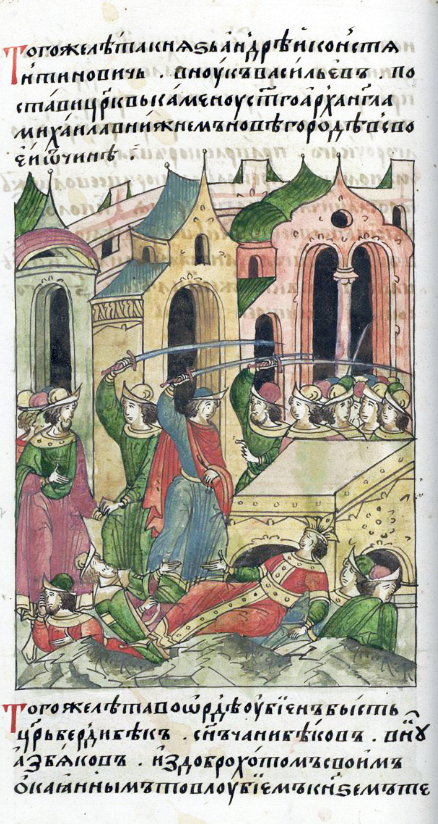
- Murder of Berdi Beg, miniature from the Illustrated Chronicle of Ivan the Terrible (16th century)

Khan of the Golden Horde Western Half (Blue Horde)
- Reign: 1357–1359
- Predecessor: Jani Beg
- Successor: Qulpa
- Born: c. 1310
- Died: August 1359
- Issue: Tulun Beg Khanum
- Dynasty: Borjigin
- Father: Jani Beg
- Mother: Toqai Toghlu Khatun
- Religion: Islam

Berdi Beg, also known as Berdibek or Birdibek (Turki/Kypchak: بردی بک; Persian: محمد بردی بیگ; c. 1310 – 1359), was Khan of the Golden Horde from 1357 to 1359, having succeeded his father Jani Beg. Berdi Beg was the last khan to rule before the beginning of a long cycle of civil wars in the Golden Horde known as the Great Troubles.

== Early life ==
When Jani Beg conquered the Chupanid kingdom in Azerbaijan and northwestern Iran in 1357, he left his son Berdi Beg as viceroy in Tabriz. However, Jani Beg became seriously ill on his return home, and either at his prompting or on his own initiative, his officer Tughluq Beg secretly communicated this information to Berdi Beg. The latter immediately rushed home, with a mere 10 companions. Jani Beg's condition improved, and when he discovered his son's return he was concerned about Berdi Beg's intentions. Although Jani Beg's wife Toqai Toghlu Khatun, Berdi Beg's mother, reassured the khan that his son was no threat, worried about Jani Beg's suspicions, Tughluq Beg arranged for the khan's murder.

Although Jani Beg's contemporaries suspected that he was killed on Berdi Beg's order, he appeared to have been on good terms with his heir following the Tabriz campaign. A late Russian source, the Nikon Chronicle, says Jani Beg was killed at the hands of the ulus beys due to strangulation. Persian sources place the responsibility for Jani Beg's murder on either Berdi Beg or the ulus beys, who considered him to be too old, although there are no direct sources on his death.

== Reign ==
Following Jani Beg's death on 22 July 1357, Berdi Beg was now declared khan. The Russian princes visited Berdi Beg to congratulate him. Following this, Vsevolod, the appanage prince of Kholm, had set off to Sarai in an attempt to contest his uncle's position as the prince of Tver, but Berdi Beg arrested him "without judgement" and Vsevolod was forced to return to Tver. His uncle Vasily waited for him to return and he had Vsevolod and his retinue ransomed.

Berdi Beg followed the advice of Tughluq Beg and proceeded to eliminate all foreseeable opposition by ordering the execution of at least 12 of his closest kinsmen; one, his 8-month-old brother, he killed himself, by hurling the infant to the ground, despite the supplications for pity by their grandmother Taydula Khatun. While Berdi Beg was ruthless in eliminating his kinsmen, he appears to have retained the services of his father's administrators: three out of four emirs attested in Jani Beg's treaty with the Venetians in 1347 appear in Berdi Beg's treaty with the Venetians in 1358. Berdi Beg expanded the officialdom, increasing the number of emirs to six.

Berdi Beg was unable or unwilling to maintain his control over Azerbaijan, which reverted to survivors of the Chupanid regime and became the object of competition among other regional powers. Tensions with the Venetians in the Crimea led to a new treaty between them and the Golden Horde in 1358. By the terms of the treaty, Berdi Beg allowed the Venetians to trade in Soldaia (Sudak) and lowered the tax on commercial transactions due to the khan. The Russian Orthodox clergy, notably Metropolitan Aleksej, also benefited from the khan's generosity, and in a diploma (yarliq) issued in November 1357, it recovered rights that had been taken away by Jani Beg: it revoked taxes on homes belonging to the Church and restored the independence of the ecclesiastical courts within the khan's territory.

According to later accounts, by eliminating so many of his kinsmen, Berdi Beg was responsible for the extinction of the line of Batu on his own death. In circumstances that remain unclear, Berdi Beg and his sinister advisor Tughluq Beg were murdered in August/September 1359, and Qulpa was made khan instead. However, according to Muʿīn-ad-Dīn Naṭanzī and Ötemiš-Ḥājjī, Berdi Beg died of illness; the most contemporary source, the Venetian notary Benedetto Bianco, writes that Berdi Beg went the way of all flesh, "viam universi carnis ingresso," and Qulpa became khan four days later. The Golden Horde's time of troubles, in which no less than 25 khans rose to the throne in 20 years, followed. Berdi Beg left a daughter, probably Tulun Beg Khanum (she later reigned in 1370-1371), who was married to Mamai and, subsequently, to Tokhtamysh, who executed her in 1386.

== Genealogy ==
- Genghis Khan
- Jochi
- Batu Khan
- Toqoqan
- Mengu-Timur
- Toghrilcha
- Uzbeg Khan
- Jani Beg
- Berdi Beg

== See also ==
- List of khans of the Golden Horde

== Bibliography ==
- Favereau, Marie; Pochekaev, Roman Yu. (2023). "The Golden Horde, c. 1260–1502". The Cambridge History of the Mongol Empire. Cambridge University Press. pp. 243–318. ISBN 978-1-107-11648-1.
- Fennell, John (15 November 2023). The Emergence of Moscow, 1304–1359. Univ of California Press. ISBN 978-0-520-34759-5.
- Gaev, A. G., "Genealogija i hronologija Džučidov," Numizmatičeskij sbornik 3 (2002) 9-55.
- Grekov, B. D., and A. J. Jakubovskij, Zolotaja orda i eë padenie. Moscow, 1950.
- Grigoriev, A. P., "Zolotoordynskie hany 60-70-h godov XIV v.: hronologija pravlenii," Istriografija i istočnikovedenie stran Azii i Afriki 7 (1983) 9-54.
- Howorth, H. H., History of the Mongols from the 9th to the 19th Century. Part II.1. London, 1880.
- Judin, V. P., Utemiš-hadži, Čingiz-name, Alma-Ata, 1992.
- May, T., The Mongol Empire. Edinburgh, 2018.
- Morgan, D., The Mongols. Oxford, 1986.
- Počekaev, R. J., Cari ordynskie: Biografii hanov i pravitelej Zolotoj Ordy. Saint Petersburg, 2010.
- Safargaliev, M. G., Raspad Zolotoj Ordy. Saransk, 1960.
- Thackston, W. M. (trans.), Khwandamir, Habibu's-siyar. Tome Three. Cambridge, MA, 1994.
- Tizengauzen, V. G. (trans.), Sbornik materialov, otnosjaščihsja k istorii Zolotoj Ordy. Izvlečenija iz arabskih sočinenii, republished as Istorija Kazahstana v arabskih istočnikah. 1. Almaty, 2005.
- Tizengauzen, V. G. (trans.), Sbornik materialov otnosjaščihsja k istorii Zolotoj Ordy. Izvlečenija iz persidskih sočinenii, republished as Istorija Kazahstana v persidskih istočnikah. 4. Almaty, 2006.

Preceded by Jani Beg	Khan of the Golden Horde; 1357–1359	Succeeded by Qulpa
