= Özbeg Khan =

Khan of the Golden Horde from 1313 to 1341

Özbeg
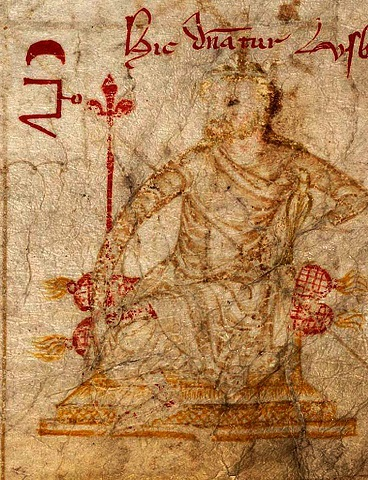
- Depiction of Özbeg in the Dulcert map, 1339

Khan of the Golden Horde Western Half (Blue Horde)
- Reign: 1313–1341
- Predecessor: Toqta
- Successor: Tini Beg
- Born: 1282; Golden Horde
- Died: 1341 (aged 58–59); Sarai
- Spouse: Bulughan Khatun; Taydula Khatun; Kabak Khatun; Urduja Khatun; Bayalun Khatun; Sheritumgha Khatun; Maria Khatun
- Issue more...: Tini Beg; Jani Beg
- House: Borjigin
- Dynasty: Golden Horde
- Father: Togrilcha
- Religion: Sunni Islam

Özbeg or Uzbeg Khan (1282–1341), also known as Giyas ad-Din Muhammad Uzbek Khan, (Note: Turki/Kypchak and Persian: غیاث الدین محمد اوزبک خان, romanized: Ghiyâsuddin Mohammad Uzbak Khân) was Khan of the Golden Horde from 1313 to 1341. He was the longest-reigning khan, under whose rule the state reached its zenith. He was succeeded by his son Tini Beg. He was the son of Toghrilcha and grandson of Mengu-Timur, who had been khan of the Golden Horde from 1266 to 1280.

== Biography ==
Flag of the Golden Horde, during the reign of Öz Beg Khan

Öz Beg was born in 1282. His father Togrilcha was one of the Genghisid princes that overthrew Tode-Mengu (r. 1280–1287). Later, he was executed by his brother Toqta (r. 1291–1312). Toqta took Togrilcha's widow for wife and sent his son Öz Beg to exile in a distant region of the Golden Horde: either Khorazm or the country of Circassians. Özbeg, before he became Khan, was likely educated in Circassia; he was sent to Circassia for protection and he was protected and trained by a Circassian leader named Inal Bek (identified as a Chemguy prince), according to the chronicle Ötemiş Hacı Tarihi, as well as Abd al-Ghaffar Kyrymi. The Crimean ruler Shahin Giray later recorded that Tokhta sent his nephew Özbeg to be raised by Circassian princes. He became familiar with local customs, and learned the Circassian language.

Converted to Islam by Ibn Abdul Hamid, a Sunni Sufi Bukharan sayyid and sheikh of the Yasavi order, Öz Beg assumed the throne upon the death of his uncle Toqta in January 1313 with the help of the former Khans' vizier Temur Qutlugh and of Bulaghan (or Bayalun) khatun. Circassian nobles with whom he had connections also supported his ascension to the throne. At his conversion, he officially took the name Ghiyāth al-Dīn Muhammad. His conversion is also mentioned in Russian chronicles, but without any detailed information; the standard entry notes that the khan Toqta died in the year 6821 (1313) and the new khan Öz Beg took the throne and "became a Muslim" (obesermenilsia). Öz Beg may have converted in order to secure support from the Muslim begs. It is known that upon ascending to the throne, Özbeg made an effort to spread Islam in Circassia. In response to Özbeg's proclamation, various Circassian princes converted to Islam and entered Özbeg's court in Sarai. In the capital city of Sarai, a dedicated Circassian quarter existed, as documented by Ibn Battuta during his visit in 1334. Mosques were also constructed in Circassia during the reign of Özbeg.

At first, many Mongol nobles were against him due to fears that they would be forced to adopt Islamic law. As a result, they organized a plot to kill the new khan. Öz Beg discovered the plot and crushed the rebels. Öz Beg determinedly spread Islam among the Golden Horde and allowed missionary activities to expand in the surrounding regions. Öz Beg found out that his competitor was backed by the envoys of the Great Khan Ayurbarwada Buyantu and this fact helped deteriorate his relationship with the Yuan dynasty. The last of his rebellious relatives was shamanist Ilbasan of the eastern half of the Golden Horde, who was murdered in 1320. Öz Beg installed the Muslim Mubarak Khwaja as a replacement to the throne of the White Horde, but he discouraged their independence. In the long run, Islam enabled him to eliminate inter-factional struggles in the Horde and to stabilize state institutions. Russian scholar Lev Gumilev wrote that in this manner was Öz Beg able to turn the khanate into a sultanate.

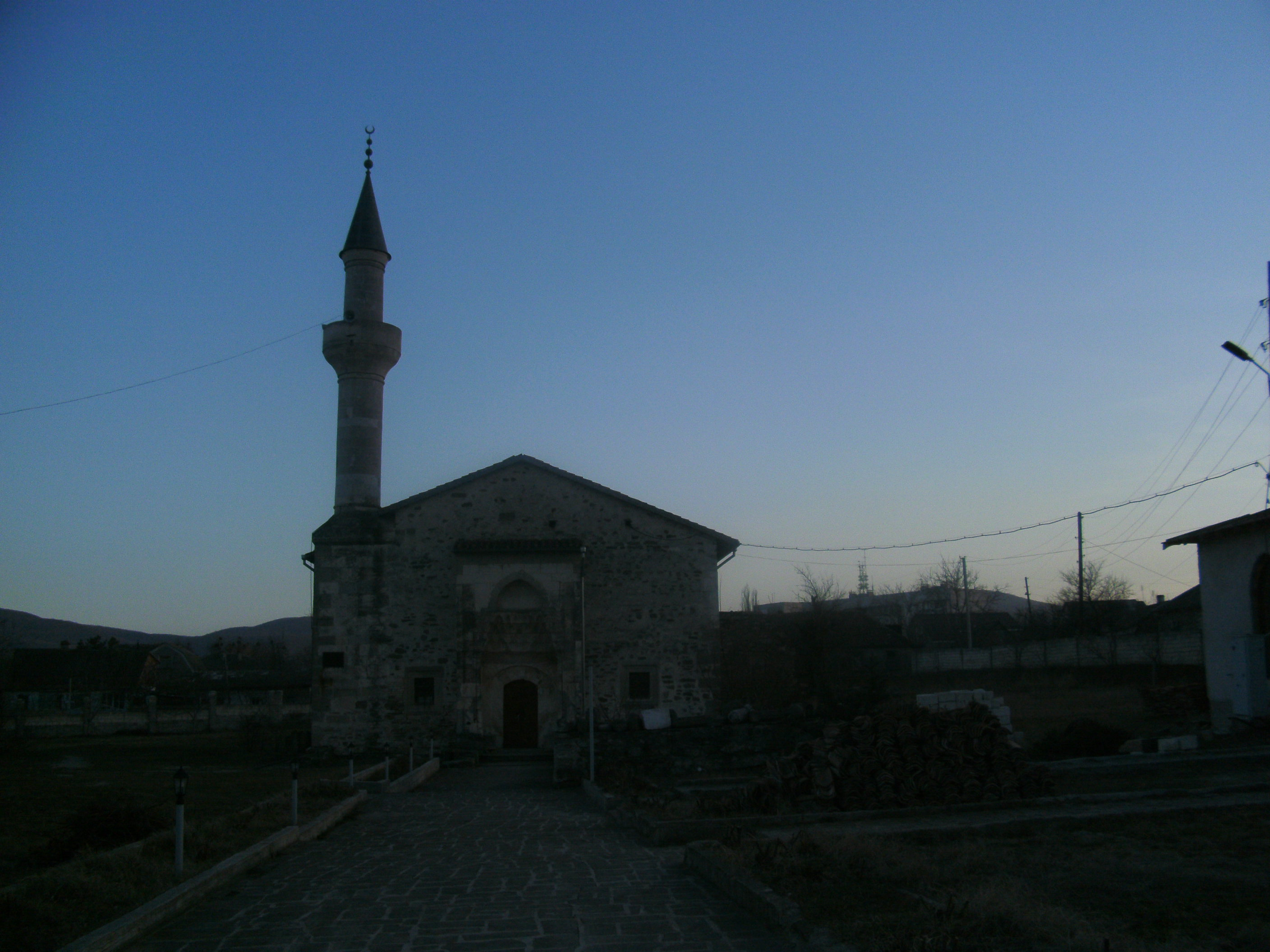
Mosque of Öz Beg Khan built in Crimea in 1314

Despite his strong commitment to Islam, Öz Beg allowed the Russian Church and other religious minorities to feel free from oppression, and he confirmed Mengu-Timur's decree to give Russian clergy a tax exemption. Öz Beg was very tolerant of Christians as exemplified by a letter of thanks he received from Pope John XXII, in which the Christian leader thanked Öz Beg for his kind treatment of Christians. Öz Beg also permitted Christians to operate in the regions bordering the Black Sea. Öz Beg had sent a letter to Metropolitan Peter which stated:

By the will and power, the greatness and most high! Let no man insult the metropolitan church of which Peter is head, or his service or his churchman; let no man seize their property, goods or people, let no man meddle in the affairs of the church...Their laws, their churches and monasteries and chapels shall be respected; whoever condemns or blames this religion, shall not be allowed to excuse himself under any pretext, but shall be punished with death.

The khan also granted tax exemption to the Franciscan missionaries in the Golden Horde, following the Mongolian fiscal tradition.

== Reign ==
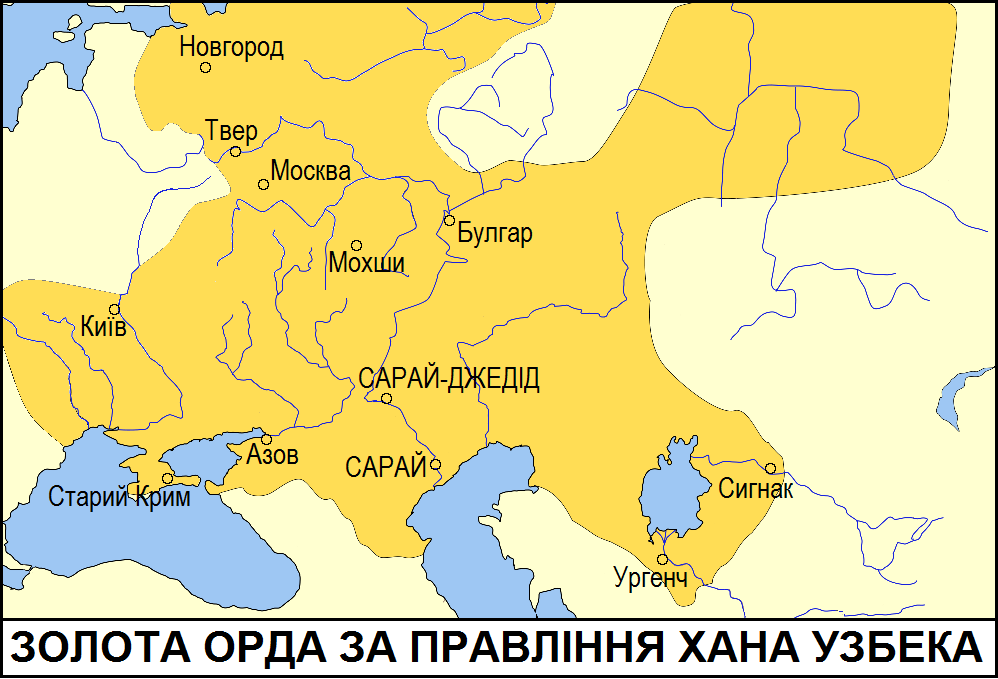
Territories of the Golden Horde under Öz Beg Khan

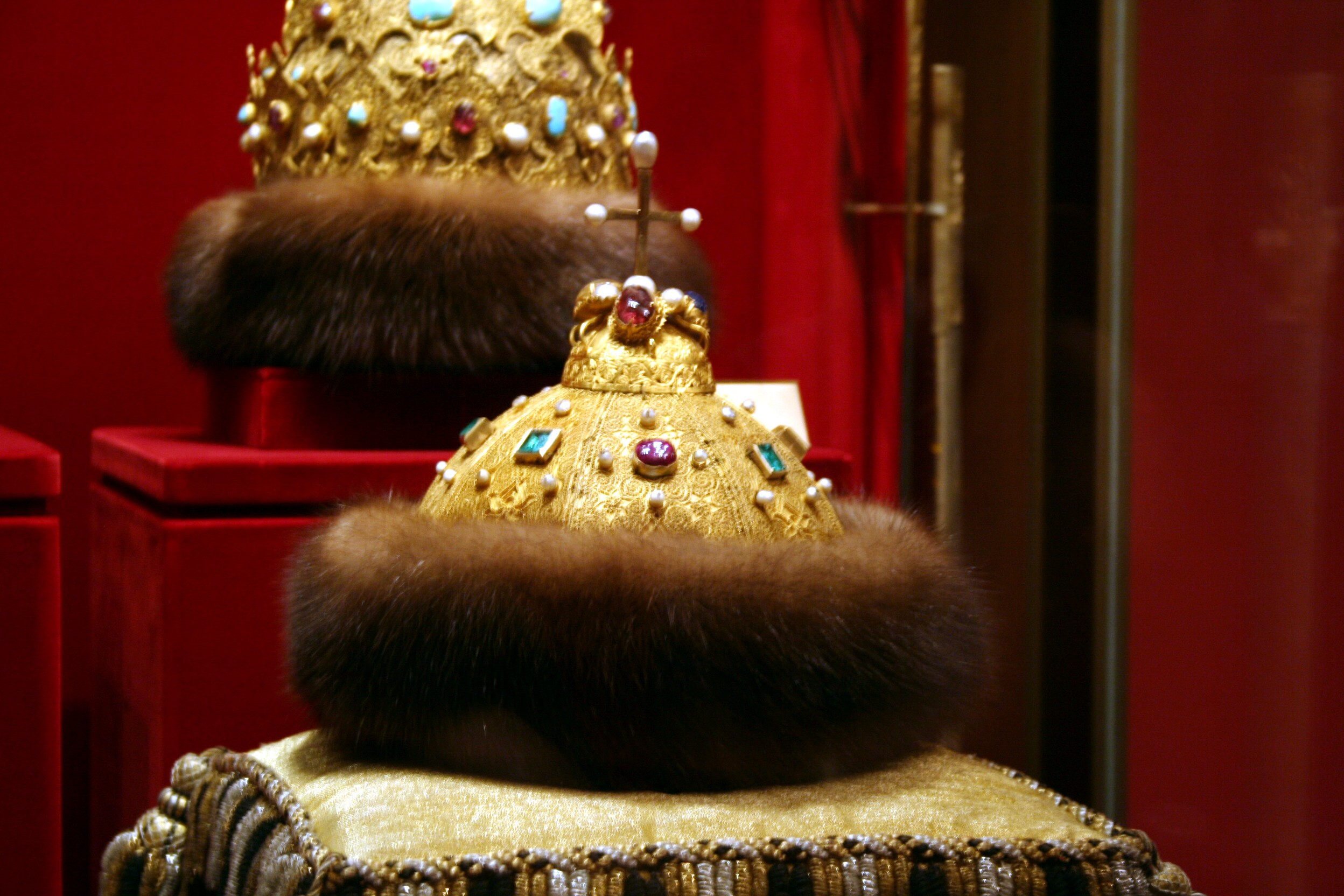
Cap of Monomakh of Turkic origin to Ivan Qalita

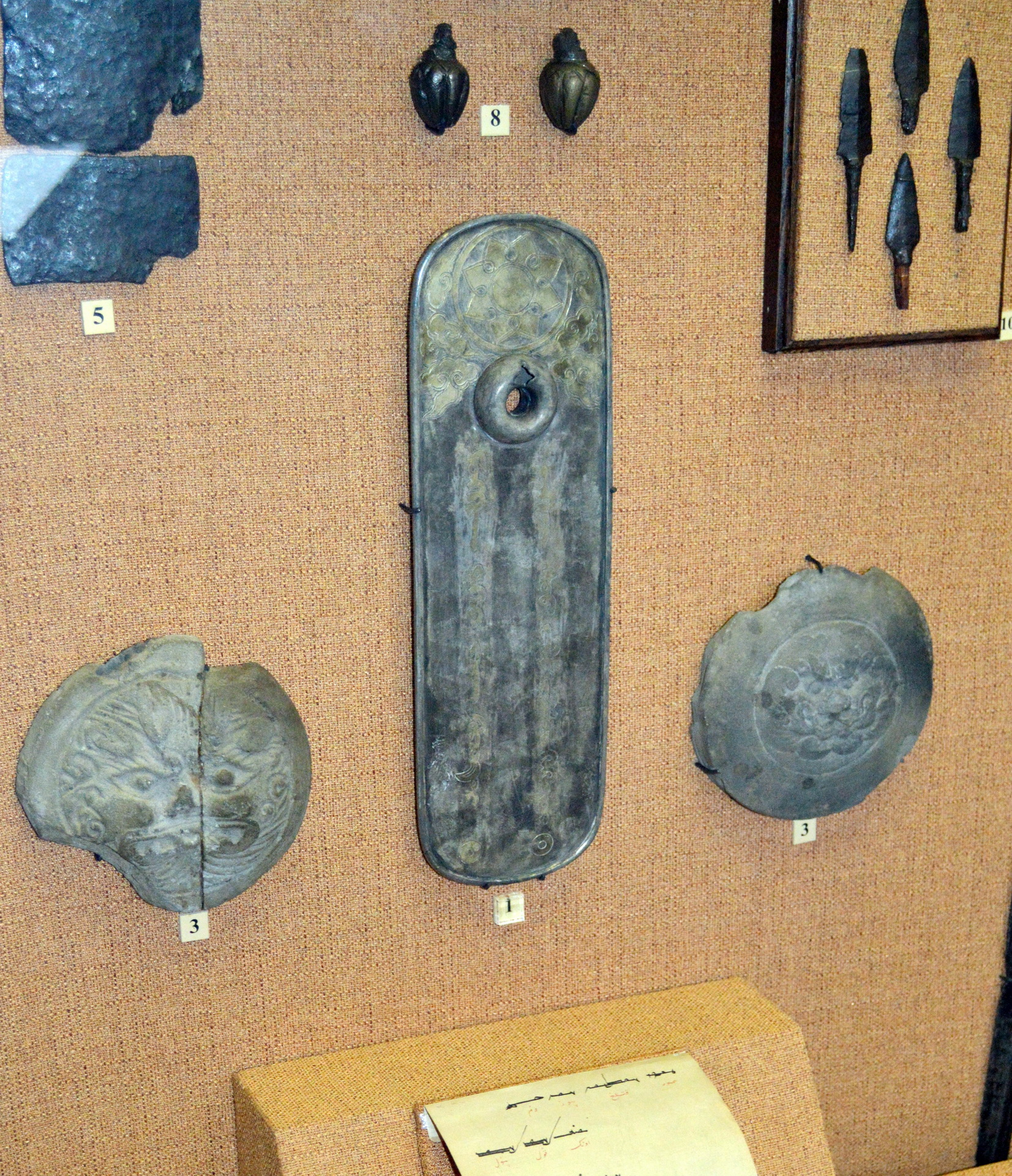
Paiza of Öz Beg Khan

=== Military and politics ===
Öz Beg maintained one of the largest armies in the world, which exceeded 300,000 warriors. He employed his military clout to conduct campaigns against the Ilkhanate in Azerbaijan in 1319, 1325 and 1335. Ilkhanid commander Chupan repulsed one Öz Beg's first two attempts and even invaded deep into the Jochid Ulus in 1325. Öz Beg found an ally against the Ilkhanids in Mamluk Egypt; indeed, one of Cairo's squares was named after him. The Khan had the daughter of previous Khan's sister, Princess Tulunbuya, married to a Mamluk sultan, but she died in a few years. The khan instructed his merchants to lend 27,000 dinars to the Mamluk ambassador in order to finance the feast for the bride at Sarai. Soon after Öz Beg was disappointed with the Mamluk sultan's divorce with Tulunbuya and indecisiveness regarding the joint invasion of Ilkhanate. In 1323, a peace treaty was signed between Egypt and the Ilkhanate. This situation nullified the alliance and the Mamluks refused to invade the Ilkhanate. Öz Beg's next incursion coincided with Abu Said's death. However, the weather turned bad and the new Ilkhan Arpa Ke'un came with a large force; Öz Beg's army was forced to withdraw.

Prior to and during the Esen Buqa–Ayurbarwada war, Chagatai Khan Esen Buqa I attempted to gain the support of Öz Beg Khan against Ayurbarwada Buyantu Khan, the Great Khan of the Mongol Empire and the Emperor of the Yuan dynasty, in 1313 and 1316. Esen Buqa warned Öz Beg that the Great Khan would overthrow him from the throne of the Horde and install another Khan from the Jochids instead. However, Öz Beg's vizier convinced him not to believe this and the Khan refused to help Esen Buqa. Nevertheless, remembering their support for the rival claimant to his throne, Öz Beg tried his best to eliminate every influence and inspiration of the Yuan dynasty on the Golden Horde in the early part of his reign. The Khan's diplomatic relationship with the Yuan, however, improved in 1324. Ayurbarwada Buyantu Khan granted him the de jure rights to rule the Golden Horde (Ulus of Jochi in the Yuan sources). By the 1330s, Öz Beg had begun sending tribute to the Mongol Yuan Emperors and received his share from Jochid possessions in China and Mongolia in exchange.

Öz Beg was engaged in wars with Bulgaria and the Byzantine Empire from 1320 to 1332. He repeatedly raided Thrace, partly in service of tsar Michael Shishman of Bulgaria war against both Byzantium and Serbia that began in 1319. His armies pillaged Thrace for 40 days in 1324 and for 15 days in 1337, taking 300,000 captives. After Öz Beg's death in 1341, reportedly in October or November, his successors did not continue his aggressive policy and contact with Bulgaria lapsed. His attempt to reassert Mongol control over Serbia was unsuccessful in 1330. Byzantine Emperor Andronikos III purportedly gave his illegitimate daughter in marriage to Öz Beg but relations turned sour at the end of Andronikos's reign, and the Mongols mounted raids on Thrace between 1320 and 1324 until the Byzantine port of Vicina Macaria was occupied by the Mongols. Andronikos's daughter, who adopted the name Bayalun, managed to escape back to the Byzantine Empire, apparently fearing her forced conversion to Islam. In the south-east of the Kingdom of Hungary, Wallachia and its ruler Basarab I became an independent power with the support of Öz Beg after 1324.

Öz Beg allowed Genoese merchants and mariners, who had been harassed by Tokhta, to settle in Crimea. However, the Mongols sacked Sudak under Khan Öz Beg in 1322 as a result of a clash between Christians and Muslims in the city. The Genoese merchants in the other towns were not molested in 1322. The Pope himself intervened and asked Öz Beg to restore the Roman Catholic churches that were destroyed in revenge, because of the Christian clash against Muslims in the city. Öz Beg was friendly towards the Pope and exchanged letters and gifts. Khan Öz Beg signed a new trade treaty with the Genoese in 1339 and allowed them to rebuild the walls of Caffa. In 1332 he had allowed the Venetians to establish a colony at Tanais on the Don.

=== New Sarai ===
During the reign of Öz Beg, Sarai (literally meaning "palace" in Turkish and Uzbek, and a hotel / inn / temporary residence in Persian and Urdu) was more quickly becoming a main commercial center and industrial trading center of the country rather than just a political center. The expression of Mongol camp mentality, following Ash and the nearby absence of some structures. The traveler Ibn Battuta described the capital as "one of the finest of cities, of boundless size [...] choked with the throng of its inhabitants, and possessing good bazaars and broad streets".

To successfully spread Islam, it was necessary to build a mosque and other "elaborate places" like baths, an important element of Muslim culture. Sarai attracted merchants from European, Asian and Islamic countries as well as Middle East. Slave trade flourished due to strengthening ties with Mamluk Sultanate. Successful commercial revolutions require new markets and caravans: "places where merchants find their way." Growth of wealth and increasing needs of production always stimulate population growth. This did not suffice solely in Sarai. The accretion of the dwellings in the region transformed the capital into the center of a large Muslim government, giving it the appropriate aspect and status. Öz Beg actually came to build a new city, which received the official name Saray al-Jedid or New Sarai.

=== Relationship with Russian princes ===
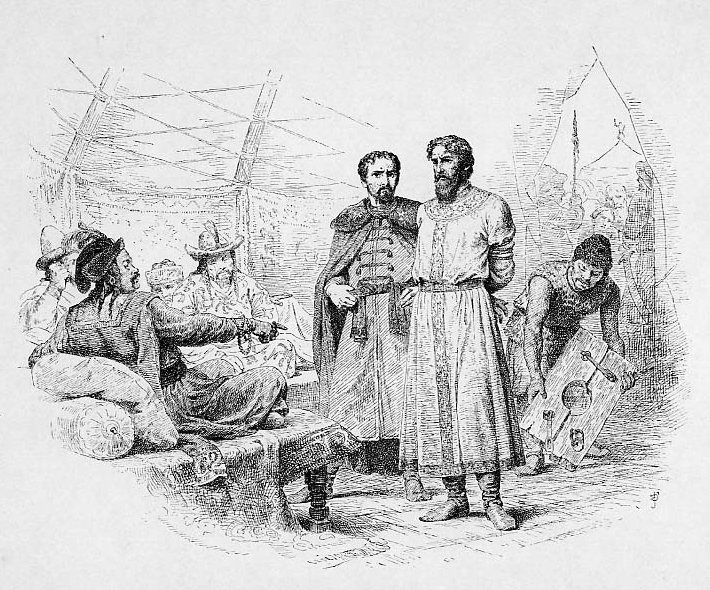
Mikhail of Tver before Uzbeg Khan, by Vasili Vereshchagin

Historians have described the reigns of Toqta and Öz Beg as marking "the apogee of Mongol rule in Russia". Öz Beg continued to interfere in relations between the Russian princes; he supported the earliest princes of Muscovy—his brother-in-law Yury of Moscow and Yury's successor Ivan I—against their relatives, the westward-leaning princes of Tver. Yury was made grand prince and Öz Beg's sister married him. Four of these princes of Tver—Mikhail of Tver, his sons Dmitry ("The Terrible Eyes") and Aleksandr Mikhailovich, and his grandson Fyodor—were all killed in Sarai at Öz Beg's behest. The Russian proverb "Near to the king, near to death" (Близ царя — близ смерти) is thought to date back to the time of Öz Beg's reign.

In 1317, Mikhail Yaroslavich defeated Yury at a village called Bortenevo. Mikhail captured Yury's wife, Konchaka, who was the Khan's sister. Unluckily, Konchaka died when she was in the custody of Mikhail; Yury announced to the Khan that she had been poisoned by order of Mikhail. He and Yury were summoned to the court of the Golden Horde for a trial, after which Mikhail was beheaded in November 1318.

Following Yury's machinations, which prompted the Khan to grant the yarlik (patent of office for the title of Grand Prince of Vladimir) to Moscow and led to their father's execution by the Horde, Dmitry and his brother, Aleksandr, fought a series of battles with Yury and intrigued against him at the Horde, culminating in Dmitry's acquisition of the yarlik of office for the grand princely throne in 1322, after he had persuaded the khan that Yury had appropriated a large portion of the tribute due to the Horde. Yury was summoned to the Horde in Sarai for a trial but, before any formal investigation, was killed by Dmitry, November 21, 1325. Öz Beg waited to punish Dmitry and eventually he arrested the Prince of Tver for the murder, executing him in 1326.

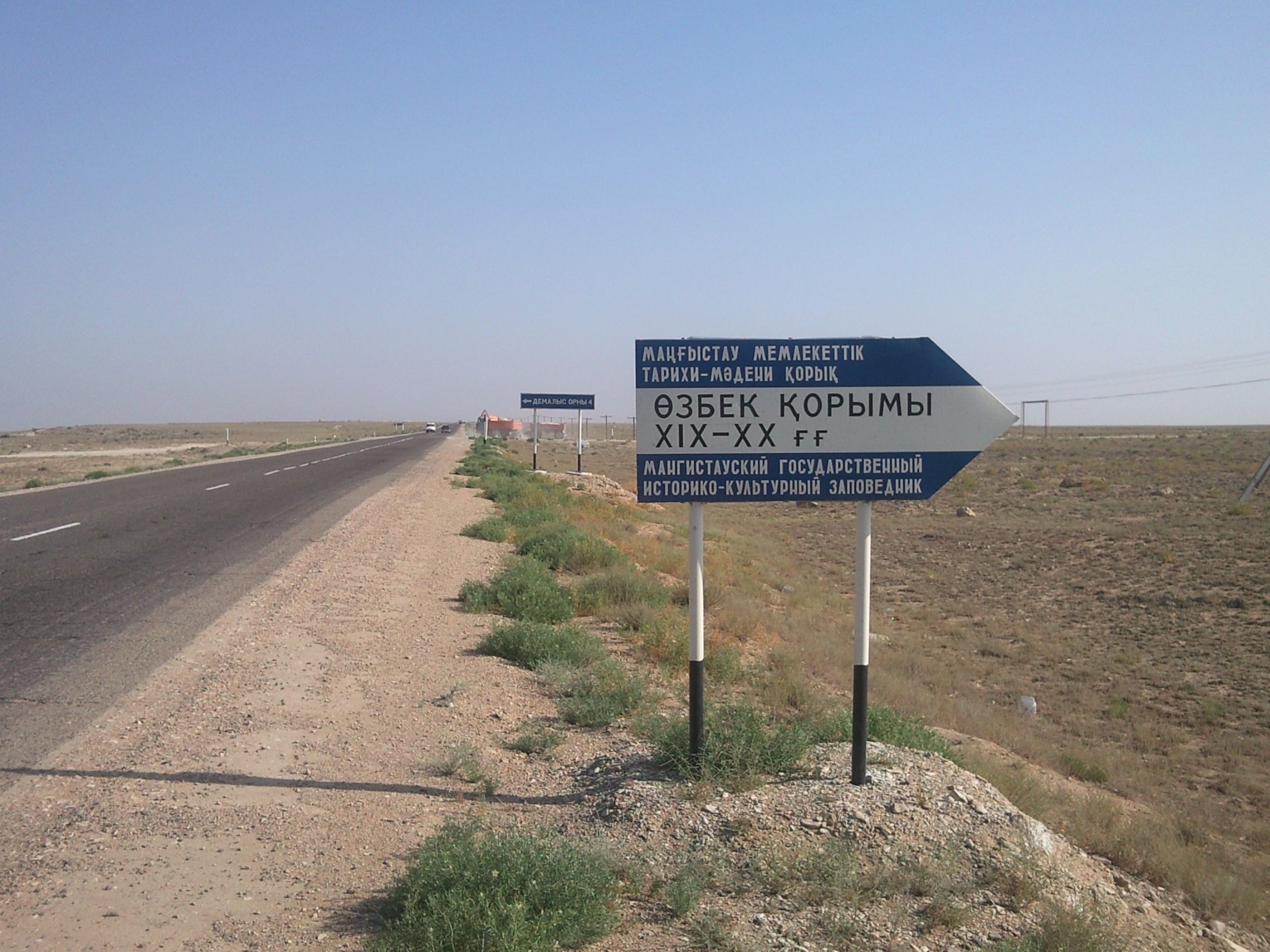
Sign pointing to the grave of Öz Beg Khan at the exit of the city of Aktau

When the Khan's cousin, the baskak Shevkal, and his Tatars were killed in Tver and a rebellion erupted there in mid-August 1327, Öz Beg ordered Ivan I of Moscow, along with Aleksandr of Suzdal, to lead a Tatar army of 50,000 soldiers on a punitive expedition. Dmitry's successor as Prince of Tver and Grand Prince of Vladimir, his brother Aleksandr Mikhailovich, fled first to Novgorod—which turned him away—and then to Pskov—which made him its Prince—in order to escape. Due to his failure to deliver Aleksandr of Tver to the khan, Ivan was not made the sole grand prince and the grand principality was divided between Ivan I of Moscow and Aleksandr of Suzdal. Following the latter's death in 1331, Öz Beg appointed Ivan to the position of Grand Prince of Vladimir; that marked the true beginning of the rise of the Muscovites.

Aleksandr, after many travails, including exile in Sweden and Lithuania, eventually prospered in Pskov, under the patronage of Gediminas, Grand Duke of Lithuania. He sent his son Fyodor to the Horde, with tribute and seeking forgiveness, in 1335; the Khan pardoned Aleksandr and he was given the princely yarlik to Tver once again in 1337. Unfortunately, his greatest enemy, his cousin Ivan, once more set the Horde's Khan against him with the aid of intrigue. Aleksandr was summoned to the Horde again and was executed at the hand of Öz Beg.

Öz Beg welcomed Ivan's sons and made Simeon the grand prince in 1340. Simeon was given more powers by the Khan to counter Lithuania's growing power. Öz Beg also launched military expeditions into Lithuania, as it was clear that it threatened Mongol dominance in Russia.

== Family ==
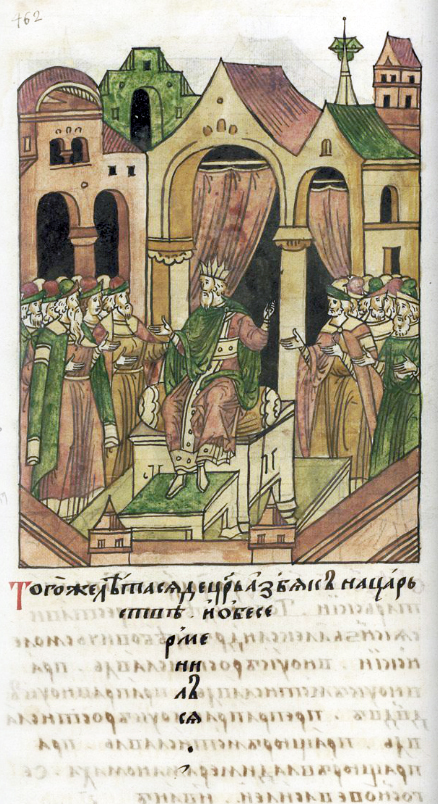
Depiction of Öz Beg Khan in the Illustrated Chronicle of Ivan the Terrible, 16th century

Öz Beg had several wives and concubines. It is not always possible to determine which mother gave birth to which child.

Wives:

- Bulughan Khatun (c. 1312) — widow of Toghrilcha and Toqta
- Bayalun Khatun the Elder (d. 1323)
- Taydula Khatun (d. 1360) — originally a Christian?
- Kebek Khatun — daughter of Amir Nanghiday
- Bayalun Khatun the Younger — (likely illegitimate) daughter of Andronikos III Palaiologos
- Orduja Khatun — daughter of amir-e ulus Isa Beg
- Sheritumgha Khatun

Sons:

- Timur Beg (d. 1330)
- Tini Beg (r. 1341–1342) (by Taydula Khatun)
- Jani Beg (r. 1342–1357) (by Taydula Khatun)
- Khiḍr Beg (d. 1342)
- Tulun Beg
- Iran Beg (father of Kildi Beg)

Daughters:

- İt Küchüjük (by Bayalun Khatun the Elder) — married to amir-e ulus Isa Beg
- A daughter (by Bayalun Khatun the Elder?) — married to Amir Ali b. Arzaq
- A daughter (by Taydula Khatun?) — married to Harun Beg, son of Amir Qutlu Temür

== Personality ==
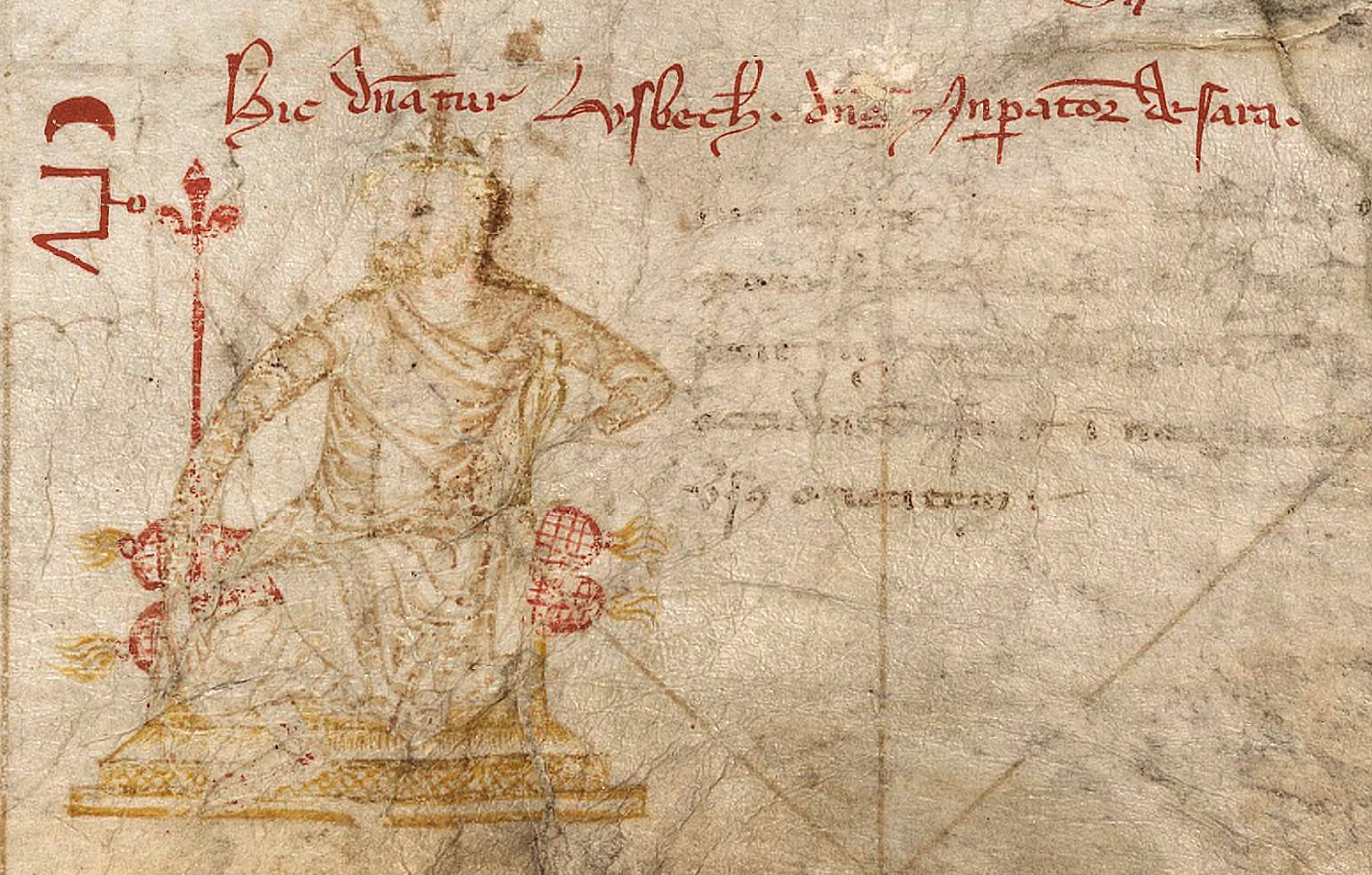
Özbeg Khan in the 1339 Dulcert map. Legend: Hic dominatur Usbech, dominus imperator de Sara, "Here rules Özbeg, the Emperor of Sara".

Many Arab and Persian authors of the 14th–15th centuries described Öz Beg Khan as an able statesman and a good-hearted, caring person. Ibn Battuta, for instance, who was granted a personal audience with him in 1333, highly praised the Khan and wrote the following: "He is one of those seven kings who are the greatest and most powerful kings of the world." Historian al-Mufaddal described him as a young man of good appearance, excellent character, a fine Muslim, brave and energetic. Geographer and historian Al-Ayni wrote: "He was a brave and courageous man, religious and pious, revered jurists, loved scientists, listened to them, trusted them, was merciful to them, visited the sheikhs and did good deeds to them."

Al-Birzali, for example, wrote: "When this king Tokhta died, Öz Beg Khan, a man of about thirty years old, reigned after him. He professed Islam, was distinguished by his intelligence, good looks and figure." He also wrote: "a young man of good appearance, good temper, an excellent Muslim and a brave man." Turkmen historian Adh-Dhahabi speaks of him in the same manner: "... a brave hero, handsome in appearance, a Muslim, who destroyed many emirs and wizards." Even the Persian historian Wassaf, who is thought to have been unfriendly to Öz Beg Khan, spoke of him with great praise: "The pious prince Öz Beg... possesses divine faith and royal splendor."

The name "Öz Beg" was of Turkic origin and had been mentioned in the Middle East even before the campaigns of Genghis Khan. This name is found in Osama Bin Munqidh's "Book of Edification" that describes the events that took place in Iran under the Seljuqs. Author notes that one of the generals of the army of the ruler of Hamadan, Bursuq, in 1115–1116, was the "emir of the troops" – Öz Beg – the ruler of Mosul. According to Rashid al-Din Hamadani, the last representative of the Ildegizid Turkic dynasty, who ruled in Tabriz, was called Öz Beg Muzaffar (1210–1225).

== See also ==
- List of khans of the Golden Horde

== Sources ==
- "Узбек" . Brockhaus and Efron Encyclopedic Dictionary (in Russian). 1906.
- Atwood, Christopher P. Encyclopedia of Mongolia and the Mongol Empire. New York: Facts On File, 2004.
- Bor, Zhu̇gdėriĭn. Mongol khiĭgėėd Evroaziĭn diplomat shastir. Ulaanbaatar: [Olon Ulsyn Kharilt︠s︡aany Surguulʹ], 2001. (in Mongolian)
- Favereau, Marie; Pochekaev, Roman Yu. (2023). "The Golden Horde, c. 1260–1502". The Cambridge History of the Mongol Empire. Cambridge University Press. pp. 243–318. ISBN 978-1-107-11648-1.
- Fennell, John (2023). The Emergence of Moscow, 1304–1359. University of California Press. ISBN 978-0-520-34759-5.
- Fennell, John (2014) [1983]. The Crisis of Medieval Russia, 1200–1304. Longman History of Russia. Routledge. ISBN 978-0-582-48150-3.
- Gibb, H. A. R. (trans.), The Travels of Ibn Baṭṭūṭa A. D. 1325–1354. Vol. 2. Cambridge, 1962.
- Howorth, H. H., History of the Mongols from the 9th to the 19th Century. Part II.1. London, 1880.
- Lane, George (25 January 2018). A Short History of the Mongols. Bloomsbury Publishing. ISBN 978-1-78673-339-9.
- May, Timothy (7 November 2016). The Mongol Empire: A Historical Encyclopedia [2 volumes]. Bloomsbury Publishing USA. ISBN 979-8-216-11905-0.
- Meyendorff, John (24 June 2010). Byzantium and the Rise of Russia: A Study of Byzantino-Russian Relations in the Fourteenth Century. Cambridge University Press. ISBN 978-0-521-13533-7.
- Morgan, David. The Mongols. Oxford: Blackwell, 1990.
- Seleznëv, J. V., Èlita Zolotoj Ordy: Naučno-spravočnoe izdanie, Kazan', 2009.
- Vohidov, Š. H. (trans.), Istorija Kazahstana v persidskih istočnikah. 3. Muˤizz al-ansāb. Almaty, 2006.
- Zimonyi, I., "Ibn Baṭṭūṭa on the First Wife of Özbeg Khan," Central Asiatic Journal 49 (2005) 303–309.

Preceded by Tokhta	Khan of the Blue Horde and Golden Horde; 1313–1341	Succeeded by Tini Beg
