= Cuman language =

Extinct West Kipchak Turkic language

Cuman
- Kuman, Kipchak, Polovcian
- Tatar til
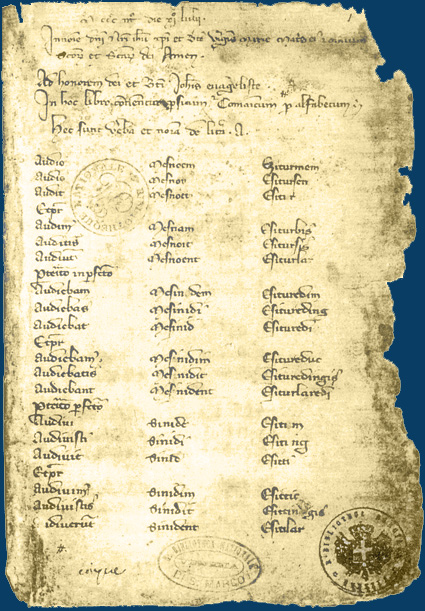
- Codex Cumanicus, 14th century
- Native to: Cuman–Kipchak Confederation, Golden Horde
- Region: Cumania
- Ethnicity: Cumans, Kipchaks, Tatars
- Extinct: In Kunság: 1770, with the death of István Varró; Other regions: evolved into Kipchak-Cuman languages
- Language family: Turkic: Common Turkic; Kipchak; Kipchak–Cuman; Cuman
- Writing system: Latin

Language codes
- ISO 639-3: qwm
- Glottolog: cuma1241
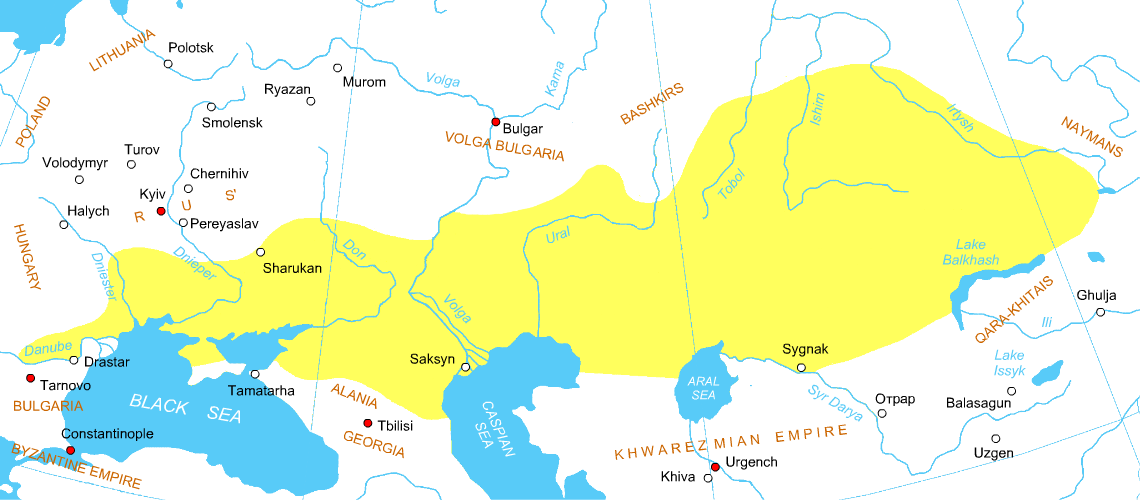
- Map of territory occupied by the Cumans around 1200

Cuman or Kuman (also called Kipchak, Qypchaq or Polovtsian, self referred to as Tatar (tatar til) in Codex Cumanicus) was a West Kipchak Turkic language spoken by the Cumans (Polovtsy, Folban, Vallany, Kun) and Kipchaks; the language was similar to today's various languages of the West Kipchak branch. Cuman is documented in medieval works, including the Codex Cumanicus, and in early modern manuscripts, like the notebook of Benedictine monk Johannes ex Grafing.

== History ==
The Cumans were nomadic people who lived on the steppes of Eastern Europe, north of the Black Sea, before the Golden Horde. Many Turkic peoples including the Crimean Tatars, Nogais, Karachays, Kumyks, Crimean Karaites, Krymchaks and Balkars, Manavs are descended from the Cumans. Today, the speakers of these various languages belonging to the Kipchak branch speak variations closely related to the Cuman language.

The literary Cuman language became extinct in the early 18th century in the region of Cumania in Hungary, which was its last stronghold. The Cuman language in Crimea, however, managed to survive. The Cuman language is considered the direct ancestor of the current language of the Crimean Tatars with possible incorporations of the other languages in the region, like Crimean Gothic.

By a preponderance Cumanian population of the Crimea acquired the name "Tatars", embraced Islam, and retained the Quman-Qipchaq Turkic language, and the process of consolidating the multi-ethnic conglomerate of the Peninsula began, which has led to the emergence of the Crimean Tatar people.

The Cuman-Kipchaks had an important role in the history of Anatolia, Kazakhstan, Ukraine, Russia, Georgia, Hungary, Romania (see, for example, the Basarab dynasty), Moldavia, Bessarabia and Bulgaria.

Radlov believed that among the current languages Cuman is closest to the Mishar dialect of the Tatar language.

== Sample ==
From the book known as the Codex Cumanicus, a Cuman Kipchak Turkic Pater Noster (transcribed in the Common Turkic Alphabet):

Atamız kim köktesiñ. Alğışlı bolsun seniñ atıñ, kelsin seniñ xanlığıñ, bolsun seniñ tilemekiñ – neçik kim kökte, alay [da] yerde. Kündeki ötmegimizni bizge bugün bergil. Dağı yazuqlarımıznı bizge boşatqıl – neçik biz boşatırbız bizge yaman etkenlerge. Dağı yekniñ sınamaqına bizni quurmağıl. Basa barça yamandan bizni qutxarğıl. Amen!

== István Varró ==
Tradition holds that the last speaker of the Cuman language was István Varró. As a Notary in the town of Karcag in Hungary (in today's Jász–Nagykun–Szolnok County) and as a representative from Cumania, István Várró was a part of a delegation in 1744 arrived in Vienna to see Empress Maria Theresa of Austria to obtain certain privileges. At the invitation of the historian and ethnologist Adam František Kollár, he recited the Lord's Prayer in Cuman to provide an example of their ancient language. This prayer, along with a few others and a number of short phrases, were then the only remnants of the extinct language, and even then they served only for instruction in Hungarian schools in memory of Cuman pupils. The text of this school lesson, transmitted by tradition and available in several copies in Hungary, was later published by the Hungarian orientalist Ármin Vámbéry. István Várró later died in 1770.

== See also ==
- Mamluk-Kipchak
- Armeno-Kipchak

== Sources ==
- Güner, Galip (2013), Kıpçak Türkçesi Grameri, Kesit Press, İstanbul.
- Mustafa Argunşah, Galip Güner (2015), Codex Cumanicus, Kesit Yayınları, İstanbul.
