= 1377 =

1377 in various calendars
- Gregorian calendar: 1377; MCCCLXXVII
- Ab urbe condita: 2130
- Armenian calendar: 826; ԹՎ ՊԻԶ
- Assyrian calendar: 6127
- Balinese saka calendar: 1298–1299
- Bengali calendar: 783–784
- Berber calendar: 2327
- English Regnal year: 50 Edw. 3 – 1 Ric. 2
- Buddhist calendar: 1921
- Burmese calendar: 739
- Byzantine calendar: 6885–6886
- Chinese calendar: 丙辰年 (Fire Dragon); 4074 or 3867 — to — 丁巳年 (Fire Snake); 4075 or 3868
- Coptic calendar: 1093–1094
- Discordian calendar: 2543
- Ethiopian calendar: 1369–1370
- Hebrew calendar: 5137–5138
- Hindu calendars
- Vikram Samvat: 1433–1434
- Shaka Samvat: 1298–1299
- Kali Yuga: 4477–4478
- Holocene calendar: 11377
- Igbo calendar: 377–378
- Iranian calendar: 755–756
- Islamic calendar: 778–779
- Japanese calendar: Eiwa 3 (永和３年)
- Javanese calendar: 1290–1291
- Julian calendar: 1377; MCCCLXXVII
- Korean calendar: 3710
- Minguo calendar: 535 before ROC 民前535年
- Nanakshahi calendar: −91
- Thai solar calendar: 1919–1920
- Tibetan calendar: མེ་ཕོ་འབྲུག་ལོ་ (male Fire-Dragon); 1503 or 1122 or 350 — to — མེ་མོ་སྦྲུལ་ལོ་ (female Fire-Snake); 1504 or 1123 or 351

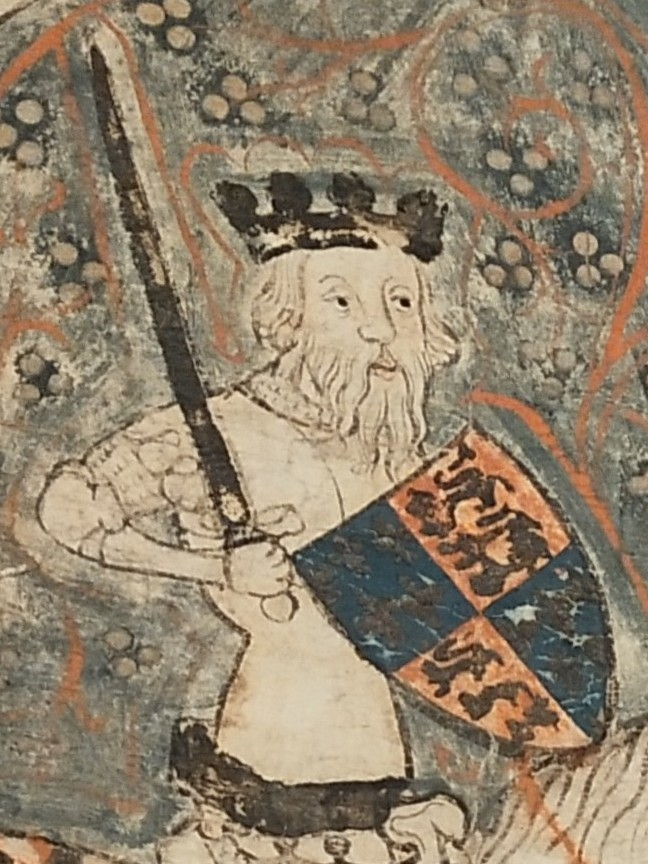
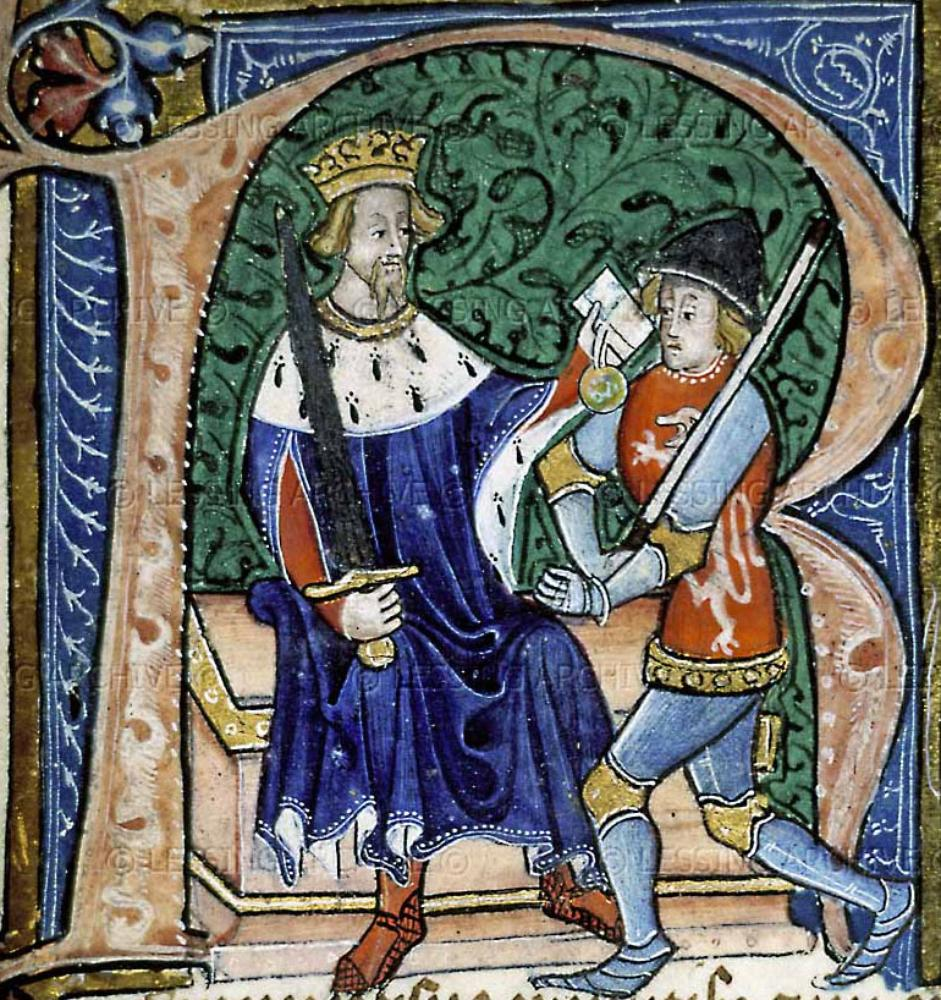
June 21: England's King Edward III dies after a reign of 50 years, and his grandson becomes King Richard II (contemporary 14th century illustrations)

Year 1377 (MCCCLXXVII) was a common year starting on Thursday of the Julian calendar.

== Events ==
=== January–March ===
- January 17 – Pope Gregory XI moves the papacy back from Avignon to Rome.
- January 27 – The "Bad Parliament", the 48th and last to be convened during the reign of King Edward III of England, begins its session with the goal of repealing most of the acts of the 1376 Parliament. Influenced by John of Gaunt, 1st Duke of Lancaster and son of King Edward, it undoes the work done by the Good Parliament, the previous year, to reduce corruption in the Royal Council. For the first time, the leader of the members of the House of Commons has a title, as Sir Thomas Hungerford, Gaunt's steward, is selected as the first "Speaker of the House of Commons".
- January – On the 24th day of the first lunar month of the year Dinh Ty, Tran Due Tong, Emperor of Đại Việt (Vietnam), is killed in the Battle of Đồ Bàn.
- February 3 – The Pope's representative in northern Italy, Robert de Geneve (the future antipope Clement VII), and mercenaries commanded by English soldier of fortune John Hawkwood, complete the three-day pillaging of Cesena in the Papal States, and 4,000 antipapal rebels are massacred.
- February 24 – In southern India, Harihara II succeeds Bukka Raya I, as ruler of the Vijayanagara Empire at its capital, Vijayanagara (now Hampi in Karnataka state).
- March 2 – The Bad Parliament dissolves and King Edward III gives royal assent to measures that roll back the 1376 legislation that he had been forced to agree to. He also approves the Bad Parliament's passage of a poll tax of four pennies for every male voter at least 14 years old, an attempt by the House of Commons to expand voting to the lower economic classes in return for expanding the tax burden from property owners to include those citizens who did not own property.
- March 13 – At Thang Long, capital of Dai Viet (now Hanoi, capital of the Republic of Vietnam), Tran Phe De succeeds his late father, Tran Due Tong as the Emperor of Dai Viet. However, the real power remains with Nghe Tong, the regent for Phe De.
- March 15 – Al-Ashraf Sha'ban, the Sultan of Egypt since 1363, is assassinated in Cairo and his 9-year-old son, Al-Mansur Ali II is installed as the new Sultan by the rebel leader Emir Aynabak al-Yalbughawi, who serves as the sultanate's actual leader.
- March 21 – John Minsterworth, who had plotted a French invasion of the Kingdom of England in conjunction with France's King Charles V, is arrested in Pamplona, and letters to him regarding the proposed invasion are discovered. Minsterworth is taken first to Bordeaux in France and then returned for imprisonment in the Tower of London, where he reveals plans for a May 1378 invasion by the French Navy. Convicted of treason, he is executed on April 12 and his body is drawn and quartered.

=== April–June ===
- April 23 – King Edward III of England formally confers knighthood upon two of his grandsons, both aged 10, Prince Richard of Woodstock (son of King Edward's deceased son Edward the Black Prince), and upon Henry Bolingbroke (son of John of Gaunt), as well as his 13-year-old illegitimate son John de Southeray, and 11-year-old John de Mowbray. Two months later, Prince Richard will become King Richard II upon Edward's death, and in 1399, Bolingbroke will overthrow Richard and becomes King Henry IV.
- May 22 – Pope Gregory XI issues five papal bulls condemning the opinion of John Wycliffe, who has argued that Catholic priests should live in poverty, like the twelve disciples of Jesus.
- May 24 – Władysław II Jagiełło succeeds his father, Algirdas, as Grand Duke of Lithuania. Jagiello initially shares power with his uncle, Kestutis Giedyminowicz, until 1381.
- June 21 – After a reign of more than 50 years, King Edward III of England dies at Sheen Palace in Richmond at the age of 64. His 10-year-old grandson, Prince Richard of Woodstock, succeeds to the throne as King Richard II. Richard is the son of King Edward's oldest son, Edward the Black Prince, who had died a year earlier.
- June 24 – The Caroline War, which had been fought for six years from 1369 until the Treaty of Bruges on June 27, 1375, resumes between the kingdoms of England and France as the treaty expires. The war, a dispute over the control of Aquitaine, will last until 1389.

=== July–September ===
- July 16 – Richard II, the 10-year-old grandson of Edward III, is crowned king of England at Westminster Abbey. A minority government is established, and a series of continual councils rule on his behalf until 1381.
- July 27 – Frederick the Simple, who has reigned as King Federico III of Sicily since 1355, dies in Messina at the age of 35 and is succeeded by his 14-year-old daughter, Maria of Aragon, who becomes the Queen of Sicily. The kingdom is administered by a regency of four "vicars", led by Artale I d'Alagona.
- August 2 – In the Battle on Pyana River, part of the Golden Horde Dynastic War, an alliance of five Russian principalities is defeated by the Mongol Blue Horde (a part of the Golden Horde), led by Arapsha Khan. According to a later Russian account, Chronicle On The Slaughter at Pyana River, the Russian troops had been drinking mead and beer while waiting at the river for the Golden Horde attack and are intoxicated when Arapsha's troops attacked from five directions. The Russian commander, Prince Ivan Dmitriyevich of Nizhny Novgorod and staff attempt to retreat across the Pyana River and drown, and the river itself, Arapsha Khan and his troops then take over Nizhny-Novgorod with no opposition. The name of the river itself derives from the Russian language word for "drunk", пьяный (pyanyy).
- August 4 – The members of England's House of Commons and House of Lords are directed, in the name of the new King Richard II, to assemble at Westminster on October 13.
- August 21 – Pope Gregory XI agrees to acknowledge the right of existence of the Bolognese Republic as autonomous within, and separate from, the other Papal States.
- August – The Hongwu Emperor of the Ming dynasty of China scraps the Office of Reports Inspection (established in 1370) for a new Office of Transmission, in his efforts to create a more efficient communicatory system in the empire. A month before this he noted that anyone could send memorials to the throne; commoners often did, although the only times their petitions were read aloud to the emperor were when they called for the impeachment of local officials who were not up to par with their official duties.Wilkinson, 534–535.
- September 24 – The Spanish Aragonese knight Juan Fernández de Heredia becomes the new Grand Master of the Knights Hospitaller, who control the island of Rhodes, one of the Dodecanese islands of Greece and the island of Cyprus. Fernandez is elected by his fellow Knights to replace the late Grand Master Robert de Juilly, who had died on July 29.

=== October–December ===
- October 13 – Richard II of England's first parliament assembles for a session of almost two months. The House of Commons members elect Peter de la Mare as the Speaker of the House.
- October 26 – Stefan Tvrtko is crowned as the first King of Bosnia at a monastery in Mileševa on the feast day of Saint Demetrius.
- November 16 – The village of Westkerke in the Netherlands, on the island of Wolphaartsdijk is entirely washed away by a flood. Three centuries later, the Dutch will reclaim the land from sea by the building of dikes, Wolphaartsdijk will no longer be an island and the area where Westkerke had existed will be resettled. The remains of the lost village will be found in 1975, almost six centuries after its destruction.
- November 30 – The Battle of Fornarina is fought in Italy when the independent village of San Ginesio (now in Italy's Macerata province) is invaded by mercenaries from the larger city of Fermo from a neighboring province. As the mercenaires cross through an unguarded and open gate, a baker in the middle of baking bread hears the troops approach, throws hot ashes into the first line of soldiers, and alerts the Ginosan troops who drive the invaders up a hill and over the side of a steep cliff.
- December 5 – The English Parliament adjourns and laws passed therein are given royal assent by Queen Joan of Kent, regent for King Richard II. Among the laws enactted are the Purveyance Act ("Prelants shall have their action of trespass against purveyors offending"), the Arrest of Clergy Act (setting "the penalty for arresting of priests during divine service.") and the Villanies Act ("Commissions shall be awarded to enquire of and punish the misbehaviour of villains and land-tenants to their lords").

=== Date unknown ===
- A rebellion against the Majapahit Empire is quashed in Sumatra in what is now Indonesia.
- Informed that Khan Urus of the White Horde has died, Timur of the Timurid Empire sends Tokhtamysh to take the Horde throne, but is defeated by Urus' son, Timur Malik.
- Radu I succeeds Vladislav I as Prince of Wallachia in what is now southern Romania.
- King U of Goryeo adopts the Ming calendar and begs to be invested by the Hongwu Emperor.
- The Trezzo sull'Adda Bridge is completed in Lombardy, and becomes the longest single-arch bridge in the world to be built for four centuries.
- A sermon by a German monk states "the game of cards has come to us this year", and prohibitions against cards are issued by Prince John of Castile, and the cities of Florence and Basel.

== Births ==
- February 15 – King Ladislaus of Naples (d. 1414)
- August 1 – Emperor Go-Komatsu of Japan (d. 1433)
- August 20 – Shahrukh Mirza, ruler of Persia and Transoxiania (d. 1447)
- September 19 – Albert IV, Duke of Austria (d. 1404)
- December 5 – Jianwen Emperor of China (d. 1402)
- date unknown
  - Louis II of Anjou (d. 1417)
  - Filippo Brunelleschi, Italian architect (d. 1446)
  - Anglesia Visconti, queen consort of Cyprus (d. 1439)
  - Ernest, Duke of Austria (d. 1424)
  - Oswald von Wolkenstein, Austrian poet (d. 1445)
  - Stefan Lazarević, Despot of Serbia (d. 1427)
  - Đurađ Branković, Despot of Serbia (d. 1456)
  - Guru Ravidas, (d. 1528)

== Deaths ==
- January 27 – Frederick the Simple, King of Sicily (b. 1341)
- March 16 or March 17 – Marie de St Pol, Countess of Pembroke and Foundress of Pembroke College, Cambridge (b. c.1303)
- April – Guillaume de Machaut, French poet and composer (b. c. 1300)
- April 23 or July 11 – Richardis of Schwerin, queen consort of Sweden (b. 1347)
- May – Algirdas, Grand Prince of Lithuania
- June 21 – King Edward III of England (b. 1312)
- date unknown
  - Ibn Battuta, Moroccan explorer (b. 1304)
  - Vladislav I, Prince of Wallachia
