= Perevoz =

Inhabited locality name

Perevoz (Russian: Перевоз) is the name of several inhabited localities in Russia.

Urban localities

- Perevoz, Nizhny Novgorod Oblast, a town in Perevozsky District of Nizhny Novgorod Oblast; administratively incorporated as a town of district significance

Rural localities

- Perevoz, Arkhangelsk Oblast, a village in Vilegodsky Selsoviet of Vilegodsky District of Arkhangelsk Oblast
- Perevoz, Republic of Bashkortostan, a village in Belyankovsky Selsoviet of Belokataysky District of the Republic of Bashkortostan
- Perevoz, Bryansk Oblast, a selo in Demensky Selsoviet of Novozybkovsky District of Bryansk Oblast
- Perevoz, Bodaybinsky District, a selo in Bodaybinsky District, Irkutsk Oblast
- Perevoz, Ziminsky District, Irkutsk Oblast, a selo in Ziminsky District, Irkutsk Oblast
- Perevoz, Luzsky District, Kirov Oblast, a village in Papulovsky Rural Okrug of Luzsky District of Kirov Oblast
- Perevoz, Nolinsky District, Kirov Oblast, a village in Perevozsky Rural Okrug of Nolinsky District of Kirov Oblast
- Perevoz, Kostroma Oblast, a village in Sokirinskoye Settlement of Susaninsky District of Kostroma Oblast
- Perevoz, Leningrad Oblast, a village in Syasstroyskoye Settlement Municipal Formation of Volkhovsky District of Leningrad Oblast
- Perevoz, Novgorod Oblast, a village in Turbinnoye Settlement of Okulovsky District of Novgorod Oblast
- Perevoz (Gorayskaya Rural Settlement), Ostrovsky District, Pskov Oblast, a village in Ostrovsky District, Pskov Oblast; municipally, a part of Gorayskaya Rural Settlement of that district
- Perevoz (Berezhanskaya Rural Settlement), Ostrovsky District, Pskov Oblast, a village in Ostrovsky District, Pskov Oblast; municipally, a part of Berezhanskaya Rural Settlement of that district
- Perevoz, Tambov Oblast, a selo in Bolsherzhaksinsky Selsoviet of Rzhaksinsky District of Tambov Oblast
- Perevoz, Nelidovsky District, Tver Oblast, a village in Nelidovsky District, Tver Oblast
- Perevoz, Udomelsky District, Tver Oblast, a village in Udomelsky District, Tver Oblast
- Perevoz, Sokolsky District, Vologda Oblast, a village in Borovetsky Selsoviet of Sokolsky District of Vologda Oblast
- Perevoz, Vytegorsky District, Vologda Oblast, a village in Makachevsky Selsoviet of Vytegorsky District of Vologda Oblast
