= Khayr Pulad =

Khan of the Golden Horde from 1362 to 1364

Khayr Pūlād (Mīr Pūlād)

Khan of the Golden Horde
- Reign: 1362–1364
- Predecessor: ʿAbdallāh
- Successor: ʿAzīz Shaykh
- Born: unknown
- Died: 1365?
- Issue: ʿArab Shāh
- Dynasty: Borjigin
- Father: Ming-Tīmūr
- Religion: Sunni Islam

Khayr Pūlād (Persian: خیر پولاد; Turki/Kypchak: خیر بولاد) or Mīr Pūlād was Khan of the Golden Horde from 1362 to 1364. He held the traditional capital Sarai during a period of civil war among rival contenders for the throne. Throughout his reign, the westernmost portion of the Golden Hode was under the control of the beglerbeg Mamai and his puppet khan ʿAbdallāh, while the easternmost portion was under the control of the heirs of Qara Nogai.

== Origins ==
Khayr Pūlād or Mīr Pūlād has been identified with Pūlād, a descendant of Jochi's son Shiban. The Muʿizz al-ansāb and the Tawārīḫ-i guzīdah-i nuṣrat-nāmah give his descent as follows: Chinggis Khan - Jochi - Shiban - Bahadur - Jochi-Buqa - Bādāqūl - Ming-Tīmūr - Pūlād. The identification is plausible; more tentative are the proposed identifications with Pūlād Khwāja, who coined at Gülistan in 1365, and Pūlād Tīmūr or rather Ūljāy Tīmūr, who coined at Gülistan in 1368. Yet another Pūlād Tīmūr was the non-Jochid emir of Bolghar, who governed autonomously and at times issued coins in the name of the long-dead khan Jani Beg. Ūljāy Tīmūr appears to have been a Tuqa-Timurid and therefore a distinct individual.

== Career ==
If Khayr Pūlād's ancestry is correctly identified, he was the first member of his branch of the Shibanids to take the throne of Sarai; the earlier khans Khiḍr, Tīmūr Khwāja, and Murād belonged to a different branch of the same family. Khayr Pūlād appears to have headed the Ulus of Shiban, which may have provided him with the manpower and resources to stake his own claim on the throne of the Golden Horde, disputed among several contenders. Khayr Pūlād may have exploited the struggle between his distant cousin Murād and first Kildi Beg, then Mamai, to seize Sarai in late 1362. Whether he took the city from Mamai's protégé ʿAbdallāh or from Murād remains unclear. While Murād, ensconced at Gülistan, and Mamai continued to fight each other, Khayr Pūlād attempted to suborn some of Mamai's emirs in the Crimea, for example issuing tax exemptions for a certain emir Ḥājjī Beg and his clan, the Shuraqul. This caused Mamai to prioritize fighting Khayr Pūlād rather than Murād. Mamai advanced on Sarai. He either defeated or weakened Khayr Pūlād, who lost possession of Sarai, apparently to another Shibanid, ʿAzīz Shaykh, in the autumn of 1364. Khayr Pūlād replaced Murād as ruler of Gülistan, although whether he is identical with the Pūlād Khwāja who issued coins there in 1365 remains unclear. Eventually, Gülistan also found itself under the rule of ʿAzīz Shaykh, by the fall of 1365. Whether Khayr Pūlād perished during these changes of fortune or returned to the Ulus of Shiban is unknown.

== Descendants ==
Khayr Pūlād was eventually followed on the throne of Sarai by several members of his family, including a nephew, Ḥasan Beg (1368–1369), a brother, Īl Beg (1374), and another nephew, Qāghān Beg (1375–1377). The last gave way to Khayr Pūlād's son ʿArab Shāh, who reigned in 1377–1380; he was an ancestor of the Shibanid khans of Khwarazm, later Khiva.

== Genealogy ==
- Genghis Khan
- Jochi
- Shiban
- Bahadur
- Jochi-Buqa
- Bādāqūl
- Ming-Tīmūr
- Khayr-Pūlād (Mīr-Pūlād)

== See also ==
- List of khans of the Golden Horde

== Bibliography ==
- Desmaisons, P. I. (transl.), Histoire des Mongols et des Tatares par Aboul-Ghâzi Béhâdour Khân, St Petersburg, 1871–1874.
- Gaev, A. G., "Genealogija i hronologija Džučidov," Numizmatičeskij sbornik 3 (2002) 9-55.
- Howorth, H. H., History of the Mongols from the 9th to the 19th Century. Part II.1, II.2. London, 1880.
- Judin, V. P., Utemiš-hadži, Čingiz-name, Alma-Ata, 1992.
- Počekaev, R. J., Cari ordynskie: Biografii hanov i pravitelej Zolotoj Ordy. Saint Petersburg, 2010a.
- Počekaev, R. J., Mamaj: Istorija “anti-geroja” v istorii, Sankt-Peterburg, 2010b.
- Sabitov, Ž. M., Genealogija "Tore", Astana, 2008.
- Safargaliev, M. G., Raspad Zolotoj Ordy. Saransk, 1960.
- Sagdeeva, R. Z., Serebrjannye monety hanov Zolotoj Ordy, Moscow, 2005.
- Seleznëv, J. V., Èlita Zolotoj Ordy, Kazan', 2009.
- Sidorenko, V. A., "Hronologija pravlenii zolotoordynskih hanov 1357-1380 gg.," Materialov po arheologii, istorii i ètnografii Tavrii 7 (2000) 267–288.
- Sorogin, E. I., "K voprosu o genealogii hanov Zolotoj Ordy v period Velikoj Zamjatni," https://ist-konkurs.ru/raboty/2007/965-k-voprosu-o-genealogii-khanov-zolotoj-ordy-v-period-velikoj-zamyatni
- Tizengauzen, V. G. (trans.), Sbornik materialov, otnosjaščihsja k istorii Zolotoj Ordy. Izvlečenija iz arabskih sočinenii, republished as Istorija Kazahstana v arabskih istočnikah. 1. Almaty, 2005.
- Tizengauzen, V. G. (trans.), Sbornik materialov otnosjaščihsja k istorii Zolotoj Ordy. Izvlečenija iz persidskih sočinenii, republished as Istorija Kazahstana v persidskih istočnikah. 4. Almaty, 2006.
- Vernadsky, G., The Mongols and Russia, New Haven, 1953.
- Vohidov, Š. H. (trans.), Istorija Kazahstana v persidskih istočnikah. 3. Muʿizz al-ansāb. Almaty, 2006.

Khayr Pulad Borjigin
Regnal titles
Preceded by ʿAbdallāh	Khan of the Golden Horde; 1362–1364	Succeeded by ʿAzīz Shaykh
