= Aziz Shaykh =

Khan of the Golden Horde from 1364 to 1367

ʿAzīz Shaykh
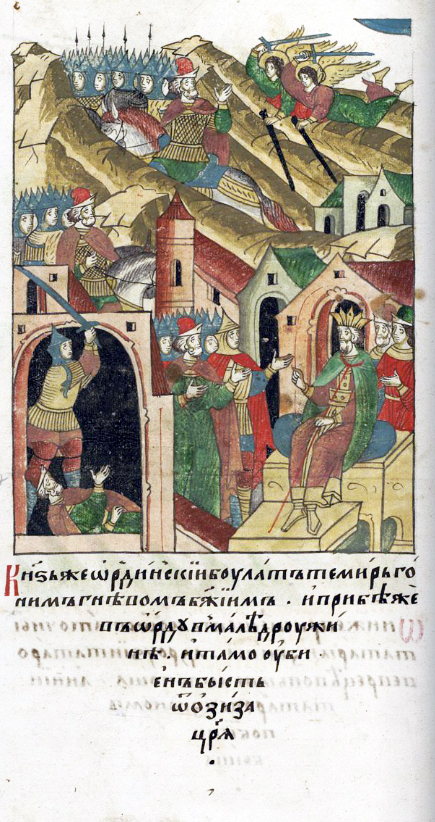
- ʿAzīz Shaykh orders the execution of the emir Pūlād Tīmūr, miniature from the Illustrated Chronicle of Ivan the Terrible (16th century)

Khan of the Golden Horde
- Reign: 1364–1367
- Predecessor: Khayr Pūlād
- Successor: ʿAbdallāh
- Died: 1367
- Dynasty: Borjigin
- Religion: Sunni Islam

ʿAzīz Shaykh (Turki/Kypchak and Persian: عزیز شیخ; Oziz in the Russian chronicles) was Khan of the Golden Horde from 1364 to 1367. He held the traditional capital Sarai during a period of civil war among rival contenders for the throne. Throughout his reign, the westernmost portion of the Golden Hode was under the control of the beglerbeg Mamai and his puppet khan ʿAbdallāh, while the easternmost portion was under the control of the heirs of Qara Nogai.

== Origins ==
The origins of ʿAzīz Shaykh are unclear. The only specific testimony regarding his ancestry comes from the notoriously unreliable account of Muʿīn-ad-Dīn Naṭanzī (previously known as the "Anonymous of Iskandar"), according to whom ʿAzīz Shaykh was the son of the ephemeral khan Tīmūr Khwāja. Despite Naṭanzī's commonly recognized unreliability, this is sometimes accepted by modern scholars in the absence of an obvious alternative. However, the more credible sources do not list such a son of Tīmūr Khwāja, and a plausible hypothesis based on the Tawārīḫ-i guzīdah-i nuṣrat-nāmah identifies ʿAzīz Shaykh with the similarly named Shibanid ʿAzīz-Bābā, son of Tūn-Khwāja, son of Balīq, son of Būrāldāy, son of Qutluq-Tīmūr, son of Sālghān, son of Shiban, son of Jochi, son of Chinggis Khan.

== Career ==
The circumstances of ʿAzīz Shaykh's rise to power are unclear. If the above identification is correct, he would have competed with his cousins, fellow Shibanids, for the throne of Sarai, while also competing with Mamai's Tuqa-Timurid puppet khans. The notion that he launched his claim to the throne from Azaq, based on his supposed early coinage there, has been disproved. One interpretation of events has him take Sarai from Khayr Pūlād in 1364 and eventually follow his rival to take over Gülistan in 1365. Another interpretation makes ʿAzīz Shaykh the successor of Murād in Gülistan in 1363, taking over Sarai only later, in 1365, from Mamai's protégé ʿAbdallāh.

ʿAzīz Shaykh quickly became involved in Russian affairs, competing with Mamai for the suzerainty over the Russian princes. In late 1365, ʿAzīz Shaykh dispatched his envoy Bayram Khwāja to demand the submission and tribute of the Russian princes and to invest Boris Konstantinovič as prince of Nižnij Novgorod in place of Mamai's appointee, his brother Dmitrij Konstantinovič of Suzdal'. Mamai and the grand prince, Dmitrij Konstantinovič's son-in-law Dmitrij Ivanovič of Moscow, opposed this and forced, with the help of the clergy, Boris to leave Nižnij Novgorod to Dmitrij Konstantinovič. Apparently changing tactics, ʿAzīz Shaykh next granted a diploma of investiture (jarlig) with the Grand Principality of Vladimir to Dmitrij Konstantinovič of Suzdal', delivered by the khan's envoy Urusmandy and the prince's son, Vasilij Dmitrievič Kirdjapa. Dmitrij Konstantinovič, however, did not dare dispute the title with his son-in-law, Dmitrij Ivanovič of Moscow and did not pursue his claim. When the autonomous emir of Bolghar, Pūlād Tīmūr, raided the lands of Nižnij Novgorod in 1367 and suffered defeat at the hands of the Russians, ʿAzīz Shaykh had him executed and replaced with his own appointee, Asan (Ḥasan).

Mamai succeeded in suborning several of ʿAzīz Shaykh's emirs with bribes, and in the end ʿAzīz Shaykh was murdered, presumably on Mamai's behest. Naṭanzī's account relates that ʿAzīz Shaykh was given to perverse customs. These were temporarily kept in check by the pious influence of a Sayyid, who was rewarded with the hand of the khan's daughter in marriage for his efforts. However, ʿAzīz Shaykh eventually returned to his sinful pleasures and was murdered.

== Descendants ==
If the identification of ʿAzīz Shaykh with ʿAzīz Bābā is correct, according to the Tawārīḫ-i guzīdah-i nuṣrat-nāmah, he was the father of Nūr ad-Dīn, who was the father of Udurman. Neither of the two is known to have played a significant historical role.

== Genealogy ==
- Genghis Khan
- Jochi
- Shiban
- Sālghān
- Qutluq-Tīmūr
- Būrāldāy
- Balīq
- Tūn-Khwāja
- ʿAzīz-Shaykh

(as identified by Gaev 2002)

== See also ==
- List of khans of the Golden Horde

== Sources ==
- Desmaisons, P. I. (transl.), Histoire des Mongols et des Tatares par Aboul-Ghâzi Béhâdour Khân, St Petersburg, 1871–1874.
- Gaev, A. G., "Genealogija i hronologija Džučidov," Numizmatičeskij sbornik 3 (2002) 9-55.
- Grekov, B. D., and A. J. Jakubovskij, Zolotaja orda i eë padenie. Moscow, 1950.
- Howorth, H. H., History of the Mongols from the 9th to the 19th Century. Part II.1, II.2. London, 1880.
- Počekaev, R. J., Cari ordynskie: Biografii hanov i pravitelej Zolotoj Ordy. Saint Petersburg, 2010.
- Polnoe sobranie russkih letopisej 11, St Petersburg, 1897.
- Sabitov, Ž. M., Genealogija "Tore", Astana, 2008.
- Safargaliev, M. G., Raspad Zolotoj Ordy. Saransk, 1960.
- Sagdeeva, R. Z., Serebrjannye monety hanov Zolotoj Ordy, Moscow, 2005.
- Seleznëv, J. V., Èlita Zolotoj Ordy, Kazan', 2009.
- Sidorenko, V. A., "Hronologija pravlenii zolotoordynskih hanov 1357-1380 gg.," Materialov po arheologii, istorii i ètnografii Tavrii 7 (2000) 267–288.
- Sorogin, E. I., "K voprosu o genealogii hanov Zolotoj Ordy v period Velikoj Zamjatni," https://ist-konkurs.ru/raboty/2007/965-k-voprosu-o-genealogii-khanov-zolotoj-ordy-v-period-velikoj-zamyatni
- Tizengauzen, V. G. (trans.), Sbornik materialov, otnosjaščihsja k istorii Zolotoj Ordy. Izvlečenija iz arabskih sočinenii, republished as Istorija Kazahstana v arabskih istočnikah. 1. Almaty, 2005.
- Tizengauzen, V. G. (trans.), Sbornik materialov otnosjaščihsja k istorii Zolotoj Ordy. Izvlečenija iz persidskih sočinenii, republished as Istorija Kazahstana v persidskih istočnikah. 4. Almaty, 2006.
- Vernadsky, G., The Mongols and Russia, New Haven, 1953.
- Vohidov, Š. H. (trans.), Istorija Kazahstana v persidskih istočnikah. 3. Muʿizz al-ansāb. Almaty, 2006.

Aziz Shaykh Borjigin
Regnal titles
Preceded by Khayr Pūlād	Khan of the Golden Horde; 1364–1367	Succeeded by ʿAbdallāh
