= Ḥājjī Cherkes =

Khan of the Golden Horde

Ḥājjī Cherkes Beg حاجی چرکس
- the Just the Just Emir
- Possible depiction of Cherkes or his governor/mayor in the Facial Chronicle (16th century)

Darughachi of Hajji Tarkhan
- Reign: 1340s–1359
- Predecessor: Unknown
- Successor: Himself (as ruler)

Khan of the Golden Horde Western Half (Blue Horde)
- Reign: 1367–1369
- Predecessor: ʿAbdallāh
- Successor: Haṣan Beg
- Reign: 1369–1374
- Predecessor: Haṣan Beg
- Successor: Īl Beg

Ruler of Hajji Tarkhan
- Reign: 1359–1375
- Predecessor: Himself (as darughachi)
- Successor: Tokhtamysh
- Died: Possibly c. 1375
- Religion: Islam

Ḥājjī Cherkes (Turki/Kypchak and Persian: حاجی چرکس) was a 14th-century emir of the Golden Horde who ruled the Hajji Tarkhan appanage and later seized control of Sarai. A non-Chinggisid ruler, he maintained his independence amid the political struggles of the Golden Horde and minted copper coins in Astrakhan bearing the title Amir al-ʿAdil Cherkes Beg ("Just Emir Cherkes Beg").

== Early life and origins ==
Cherkes is not mentioned among the princes of the Golden Horde or in the genealogies of the Chinggisids. However, Ibn Khaldun lists Cherkes alongside Urus Khan and Il Beg Khan, describing all three as "campaign emirs" or "field emirs", a term also translated as "emirs of the left wing". V. G. Tizenhausen proposed similar translations of the term, while A. Yu. Yakubovsky supported the latter interpretation. According to G. A. Fedorov-Davydov, all three emirs mentioned in the Kitab al-Ibar, including Cherkes, belonged to the Oglans of the left wing of the Ulus of Jochi under Berdi Beg.

According to Khvandamir, Cherkes, "according to the circumstances of the time," was considered a son of Jani Beg. R. J. Počekaev likewise writes that Cherkes was a pretended son of Jānī Beg

A similar account is also mentioned on the Daftar-i Chingiz-name, an anonymous Tatar historical work dating from the late 17th century. According to this work, Salchi was the son of Amat, who was the son of Isa, the son-in-law of Özbeg Khan, and Jani Beg's daughter. Salchi has been identified with Prince Salchei, mentioned in the Russian chronicles, whom some modern historians have in turn identified with Cherkes.

M. G. Safargaliev suggested that Cherkes originated from "the Circassians who were part of the Golden Horde, or had some relation to them". A. P. Grigoriev likewise argued that Cherkes was not a Chinggisid, but rather a tribal prince.

Cherkes occupied a prominent position in the political life of the Golden Horde for an extended period. According to historical accounts, he served as the governor of Astrakhan as early as the 1340s. Following the death of Khan Berdi Beg in 1359, Hadji Cherkes established himself as an independent ruler of the Hajji Tarkhan appanage.

== Reign ==
Following the death of Khan Berdi Beg in 1359, Hadji Cherkes established himself as the independent ruler of the Astrakhan appanage, with Astrakhan serving as the centre of his dominion. This effectively established the political centre of the future khanate. The city's strategically important location was of considerable significance to Cherkes. Its geographical proximity to Sarai, the capital of the Golden Horde, provided him with opportunities to influence the Horde's internal political affairs. Astrakhan also served as a convenient centre for maintaining contact with the Circassians of the Northern Caucasus and recruiting additional military contingents. Furthermore, important trade routes connecting the Caucasus, the Caspian Sea and Khorezm passed through the city. Cherkes's possessions also encompassed extensive territories surrounding Astrakhan.

During Cherkes's rise to power in the Golden Horde, the state was engulfed in civil strife following the dynastic crisis caused by the death of Khan Berdi Beg, a period known in Russian chronicles as the "Great Troubles". Several branches of the descendants of Genghis Khan's eldest son, Jochi, competed for control of the Golden Horde's capital. Meanwhile, several rulers of its appanages emerged as virtually independent powers and sought to establish their authority over Sarai. In 1367, the Crimean ruler Mamai launched a campaign against Sarai and restored Khan Abdallāh to the throne. Cherkes subsequently became one of Mamai's principal rivals in the struggle for control of the central territories of the Golden Horde. He was also opposed to Mamai's capture of Azov and the expansion of his influence in the Northern Black Sea region.

=== Struggle for Sarai ===
Cherkes responded to Mamai's actions with a campaign against Crimea, where much of Mamai's military and political power was concentrated, forcing him to return to his possessions. At the same time, Cherkes sought to establish control over Sarai. Since he was not a Chinggisid, Cherkes could not claim the throne legitimately and therefore installed his nominee, Ūljāy Tīmūr, as khan. In 1367 (or 1368), Cherkes expelled Abdallah from Sarai and placed Ūljāy Tīmūr on the throne. Ibn Khaldun identifies Hadji Cherkes as Abdallah's successor in Sarai, writing:

"Hadji Cherkes, the ruler of the Astrakhan appanages, marched on Mamai, defeated him, and took Sarai from him. Mamai went to Crimea and began to rule it independently."

According to R. Yu. Pochekaeva, Cherkes's actions demonstrate his political experience and strategic ability, which enabled him to remain at the head of a large and strategically important region for approximately 20 years. However, the accession of Ūljāy Tīmūr did not bring stability to the Horde. The struggle for Sarai continued, involving several of the most powerful political figures in the Golden Horde. After re-establishing his authority in Crimea, Mamai attempted to retaliate by marching against Astrakhan. While occupied with its defence, Cherkes was unable to assist his protégé Ūljāy Tīmūr, who was overthrown by Haṣan Beg, a descendant of Jochi's son Shiban. Haṣan Beg remained on the throne for less than a year before being ousted from Sarai in 1369 by Mamai's supporters, who restored Abdallah. However, this account is contradicted by M. G. Safargaliev, who maintains that Cherkes took control of Sarai following Haṣan's departure in 1369 and ruled there until 1374. This interpretation is supported by Ibn Khaldun's account, which identifies Hadji Cherkes, the ruler of the Astrakhan appanage, as the successor of Khan Haṣan in Sarai after the latter's retreat to the Bulgars, stating that Cherkes "recaptured Sarai from him." Haṣan ceased minting coins in Sarai in 1369. According to the research of V. D. Grekov and A. Yu. Yakubovsky, however, Cherkes's accession to the throne of Sarai should be dated to 1374. Ibn Khaldun writes that Hadji Cherkes marched against Mamai, defeated him and expelled him from Sarai, after which Mamai withdrew to the Crimean Peninsula. He provides the following account:

“When Hadji-Sherkes left his domain, Ahl Khan [Urus Khan] sent his warriors from the Khorezm region. They besieged Menju-Tarkhan [Hadji-Tarkhan]. Hadji-Sherkes sent warriors to them [to Hadji-Tarkhan] with one of his emirs. He [the emir of Hadji-Sherkes] resorted to cunning to divert the army from Menju-Tarkhan and attacked them and the emir who led them. Hadji-Sherkes was preoccupied with this feud. Aybak Khan came out against him [Hadji-Sherkes], won Sarai from him and ruled it independently for some time. Then he died and his son Kari Khan ruled Sarai after him. Then Urus Khan from the Khorezm Mountains came out against him and captured Sarai. "Karihan, son of Aibak Khan, fled and returned to his original possessions. Urus Khan established himself in Sarai, and Mamai in Crimea, the lands between Crimea and Sarai, also belonged to Mamai. These events (occurred) during the year 776 AH (1374–1375)"

According to A. P. Grigoriev, Cherkes captured Sarai from Urus Khan, a ruler of the Blue Horde and descendant of Jochi's son Tuka-Timur, who had previously driven out Mamai's protégé Muḥammad-Sulṭān.

A. P. Grigoriev attempted to correct Ibn Khaldun's account "by all available means, since the actual events are reflected here in a distorted form". After distinguishing what he considered reliable information from the inaccuracies in the account, Grigoriev proposed his own reconstruction of events in the mid-1370s. At the end of 775 AH (summer 1374), the army of Urus Khan, ruler of the Eastern Horde, bypassed the Khorezmian territories from the north and reached Sarai. The Shaybanid Elbek was then in the city and was minting coins there. After capturing Saraichik, Urus Khan began his conquest of the Lower Volga region, where the cities of Sarai (Saltpeter settlement) and Gulistan-lis-Saray (Tsarevskoye settlement) were situated on the left bank of the Volga. In the same year, 775 AH, Urus Khan entered Sarai and consolidated his victory by issuing silver coins there. According to Grigoriev, Urus captured the Golden Horde's capital with the assistance of Mamai's protégé Muhammad Bulek, whose authority in Sarai (Capae al-Jadid) was represented by copper coins dated to 776 AH. Urus Khan's occupation of the city was short-lived. By the following year, 777 AH, Bulek was once again minting coins there.

=== Further wars ===
In 1374, Urus Khan, together with the rulers of Khorezm, marched against Astrakhan, seeking to capture the city and possibly advance further towards Sarai. Cherkes dispatched troops under one of his emirs, who repelled Urus Khan's forces while they were besieging Astrakhan. By 1374, Cherkes had thus confronted the two principal leaders of the rival Horde factions seeking to establish their authority over Sarai. However, isolated in his struggle against the Chinggisids for the khan's throne and possessing limited military and material resources, Cherkes was unable to maintain control over Sarai for an extended period. While Cherkes was occupied with the conflict against Urus Khan, Il Beg Khan, a representative of the Siberian Shaybanids, launched a surprise attack and captured Sarai. Following the city's capture, Cherkes remained in Astrakhan, continuing to rank among the most powerful rulers of the Golden Horde.

According to Yu. E. Varvarovsky, Urus Khan entered the Volga region in the first half of 1375, where he defeated the forces of Cherkes. Before this, his troops had captured Sarai in 775 AH (26 June 1373 to 12 June 1374), when the city was ruled by Il Beg. Two years later, in 777 AH (12 June 1375 to 21 May 1376), Il Beg's son Qāghān-Bīk, with the assistance of Mamai, expelled Urus Khan from Sarai.

=== Death and aftermath ===
Ibn Khaldun provides little information about the activities of Hadji Cherkes after 1375. On this basis, Safargaliev places his death at around that year. The circumstances of his death are not recorded in the available sources.

For the years 1379–1380, Ibn Khaldun writes: "He (Tokhtamysh) also conquered the fief of Hajji Cherkes in Astrakhan." This marked the end of non-Chinggisid rule in Hajji Tarkhan.

== Later identifications ==
=== Prince Salchei of Astrakhan ===
"The Astrakhan Prince Salchei began to seduce them with flattery and many honors, treating them to rich dishes, but they got drunk and fell dead."

"The Astrakhanites slaughtered them all, leaving not a single one alive, and took their property for themselves. Such was the end meted out to Governor Prokofiy and another Novgorod governor, Smolyatych, along with their entire retinue: whatever they measured themselves, so was it meted out to them."

For the year 1375, the Russian chronicles record a campaign by 18 Novgorodian ushkuiniks (2,000 men aboard 70 ushkuis) who travelled down the Volga under the leadership of the voivodes Prokofy (Prokop) and Smolyanin (meaning a native or resident of Smolensk). In Astrakhan, the ushkuiniks were "full of poprad-sha", while the city's "prince" at the time was Salchei. The chronicles further record: "And having reached the mouth of the Volga, the sea and the city of Khaztorokani, and there the Khaztorokani prince, named Salchei, defeated them with flattery".

A. P. Grigoriev proposed identifying Salchi with Ḥājjī Cherkes. Indeed, there appears to be some basis for this identification. "The words 'sachi' and 'hajji'," Grigoriev writes, "are almost indistinguishable in cursive Arabic writing." Given the discrepancies in Ibn Khaldun's text as published by V. Tiesenhausen, Grigoriev therefore adopted the form "Salchi-Cherkes".

Grigoriev's hypothesis is attractive because it resolves the contradiction between sources that record different rulers in the city at approximately the same time. However, it also has several shortcomings. Firstly, the discrepancies between the manuscripts of Ibn Khaldun's work are not as significant as Grigoriev suggests. In the copy held by the National Library of France in Paris, the name of the ruler of Astrakhan is written with a sad instead of a ha, but this does not conclusively support the reading "Salchi". In al-Qalqashandi (d. 1418–19), for example, the name of Ḥājjī Cherkes is also written with a sad. Variations can even be found in the spelling of the first component of the name of the city, Haji Tarkhan. Secondly, Grigoriev is himself inconsistent in his arguments. Although he considers Ibn Khaldun's use of "Hadji" for Salchi-Cherkes to be a mistake, he nevertheless identifies a certain "Hajji", listed in tenth place in Muin al-Din Natanzi's list of Horde rulers (compiled in the early 15th century, before 1415), with Cherkes.

These issues prevent the identification of Salchi/Salchei with Ḥājjī Cherkes from being established conclusively. They make it difficult for historians to accept Grigoriev's interpretation without reservation and necessitate the search for additional sources to investigate the question further.

I.V. Zaitsev instead suggests that Cherkes may still have been alive at the time, while Salchey/Salchei could have held a position similar to that of a mayor or governor under his authority.

=== Jharcasso segno, Lord of Solkhat ===
F. Brun identified Cherkes with the ruler of Solkhat, Jharcasso segno (signore), or "Lord Cherkes", who concluded an agreement with the Genoese on 28 November 1380. The treaty survives in an Italian translation, prepared in 1383 on the orders of Melia Duce Cataneo, the consul of Caffa. In this text, the ruler of Solkhat is referred to as both Jharcasso segno and Lo Zicho segno. The translator thus appears to have rendered the ruler's proper name and title as "Zikh bey". In another translation of the treaty, the ruler of Zikhia is called Ellias/Allias/Elias fiio [figlio] de Inach Cotolloboga, meaning the son of the governor of Janibek, Kutlu-Buka-Inek. It is possible that the first translation does not mention the Zikh prince's personal name at all, and that Jharcasso segno is simply a designation meaning "Lord of Circassia". In this interpretation, the expression represents two forms of a title rather than the ruler's proper name. This can be compared with A. P. and V. P. Grigoriev's interpretation of the title "lord of Zikhia" in the Latin translation of Janibek's yarlyk to the Venetian merchants of Azov (1342) as a translation of the name Cherkes-khodja.

== Legacy ==
According to Pochekaev, Cherkes maintained his independence for an extended period by skillfully navigating the rivalries between competing claimants to the throne. Throughout his rule, he resisted the authority of both other emirs and the Chinggisids. His ability to remain an independent ruler throughout his lifetime distinguished him from other emirs who sought to establish their own independent domains but failed to maintain them for as long. The culmination of Cherkes's political career was his seizure of the khan's throne in Sarai, an exceptional instance of a non-Chinggisid ruler ascending to power in the Golden Horde.

== Territory ==
=== Pizzigani atlas (1367) ===
(Rotated) "Casa De Jarcasi" depicted on the 1367 atlas by the Pizzigano brothers

The Golden Horde on the 1367 Pizzigani atlas, with a black and yellow flag depicted above buildings in cities under Cherkes's control, including Astrakhan and Sarai

On a 1367 map of Europe, the Middle East and North Africa by Domenico and Francesco Pizzigano, a settlement called "Casa de Jarcasi" is depicted on the Volga River, above another settlement called "Janbalec". The name can be divided into "Casa" (house, headquarters or fortified settlement) and "Jarcas", the Italian spelling of the ethnonym "Circassians". Thus, "Casa de Jarcas" could be translated literally as "Circassian Headquarters" or "Circassian House".

A significant number of Circassian warriors may have been stationed at what is presumed to have been Cherkes's headquarters. Together with their commander, they may have given their name to the area depicted on the map.

Alongside the settlement, several other buildings are depicted above cities under Cherkes's control, namely Sarai and Astrakhan. The flag consists of a black banner bearing a yellow square. According to Kazakh historian Almat Absalykov, this flag may date from the reign of either Özbeg Khan or Jani Beg.

Casa de Jarcasi (rotated) on Agostinho Sardi's 1802 version of the 1367 atlas

Casa de Jarcasi (rotated) on the Jommard Mappemunde's 1864 version of the 1367 atlas

=== Confirmed domains ===
: Lands of Cherkes confirmed by sources : Lands of Cherkes disputed by historians

Cherkes initially established his rule in Astrakhan before expelling Mamai from the capital, Sarai. Thus, at the height of his power, Cherkes managed to unite the entire Lower Volga region, including Sarai and Astrakhan, under his rule. His domain also included the surrounding areas of Astrakhan.

Ibn Khaldun, who wrote about the "appanage" of Alibek, does not specify the location of his domain. However, since his coins were minted in the city of Saraychuk, his appanage must have been located along the Ural River, with Saraychuk as its centre. This would also suggest that the prince was descended from Shayban and held a Shaybanid appanage by hereditary right.

=== Unconfirmed domains ===
==== Border with Mamai ====
V. L. Egorov traced the boundary between Mamai's and Cherkes's domains along the Volga, basing his argument on numismatic evidence. It has been noted that Keldi Bek was the last khan of Sarai to mint coins in both Sarai and Azak. After him, beginning with Murid, the khans minted coins only in cities on the left bank of the Volga, usually Sarai and Gulistan. Following V. L. Egorov, other researchers, including V. G. Rudakov, have also acknowledged the significance of this circumstance.

However, an alternative interpretation has also been proposed. Yu. E. Varvarovsky argues that the boundary of Mamai's domain ran along the Don. This interpretation is supported by copper coins discovered at the Vodyanskoye settlement during excavations conducted by expeditions led by G. A. Fedorov.

Number of copper coins by type at the Vodyanskoye settlement
Obverse	Reverse	Date	Quantity
In a square inscribed within a circle: "The Just Sultan Khayr-Pulad Khan, may his reign be prolonged"	Mint of Saray al-Jadid, 764	1362–63	3
In a six-petaled frame with small circles at the joints, a snow leopard walking to the left, with a vignette above its back	Mint of Gulistan, 764	1362–63	32
In a six-petaled rosette inscribed within a circle: "Khan Abdallah, may his reign be prolonged"	Mint of Azak, 765	1363–64	2
Six-axis floral rosette	Mint of Jadid, 765	1363–64	5
Double-headed eagle in the centre of a six-pointed star	Mint of Gulistan, 766 (in cursive script in a circle)	1364–65	4
Anonymous pul	Saray al-Jadid, 768	1366–67	1
Bird with a curved beak facing right	Mint of Saray al-Jadid, 776	1374–75	6
Stylized floral ornament	Mint of Mokhshi (?) 777 or 772	1370s	1

==== Mokhsha and Khwarazm ====
A. N. Nasonov assumed that Cherkes's domain was more extensive and included two additional uluses, Mokhshi and Khorezm. As evidence, he cited information, without providing a source, about coins bearing Cherkes's name that had allegedly been minted in these centres. Based on this information, Nasonov concluded that Cherkes's domain formed a wedge between the Russian principalities and Mamai's Horde, separating them from one another while also cutting off Mamai's communications with the territory of the former Volga Bulgaria. According to Nasonov, the separation of the Russian lands from Mamai's territory by a strip of land belonging to a rival Sarai khan gave the Moscow government the confidence to confront its southern neighbour. Nasonov attributed the sharp turn in Russian policy during this period, which took an openly anti-Mamai direction, to this geopolitical situation.

However, many historians do not consider this interpretation convincing, since Nasonov's claims concerning coins issued in Cherkes's name at Mokhshi and Khorezm are not corroborated by any sources. Furthermore, the Sarai khans maintained an exclusively defensive stance and did not even attempt to launch an attack on the right bank of the Volga, which was under Mamai's control. Cherkes's own position was also extremely precarious, making it unlikely that he could have considered capturing uluses located hundreds of kilometres from Sarai. As for Khorezm, it was ruled by the Sufi dynasty during this period.

==== Crimea ====
F. Brun identified Cherkes with the ruler of Solkhat, Jharcasso segno (signore), who concluded an agreement with the Genoese. On this basis, he wrote: "It could easily have happened that Cherkes-bek, although expelled from Sarai, still held out in Crimea until 1380".

== Coinage and title ==
An example of a coin minted by Cherkes Legend Obverse: Amir al-ʿadil (Just Emir) Cherkes Bek Reverse: Mint of Hajji-Tarkhan, year 776

After the capture of Sarai by Il Beg, Cherkes remained in Astrakhan, where he minted his own coins. The copper coins minted by Cherkes are the earliest Golden Horde coins discovered in Hajji Tarkhan and the first coins to bear the city's name.

The obverse of his coins bears the inscription "amir al-ʿadil Cherkes Bek". Monety Janina's reading of the inscription as "al-sulṭān al-ʿādil", interpreted as Cherkes Bek's title, is based on coins whose inscriptions are not entirely legible, a reading that she herself questioned. According to A. P. Grigoriev, the inscription "Cherkes-bek" translates as "ruler of the Circassians". Unlike other Chinggisid rulers, whose coins bore the title "khan", Cherkes used the title "just emir".

Cherkes's coins are dated to 776 AH, corresponding to 1374–1375. All known examples have been found in Astrakhan, the centre of his domain. A. N. Nasonov claimed, without citing a source, that coins bearing Cherkes's name had also been minted in other centres. However, this claim has been disputed by other historians.

Examples of coins:

A coin featuring two fish on the obverse

== See also ==
- List of khans of the Golden Horde
- Mamai

== Sources ==
- Кагазежев, Ж. В. (2023). "Из истории черкесо-ордынских взаимоотношений: Черкес – правитель Золотой Орды (Улуса Джучи)". Вестник Владикавказского научного центра (in Russian). 23 (2). doi:10.46698/VNC.2023.59.52.001.
- Ускенбай, К. З. (2013). Восточный Дашт-и Кыпчак в XIII – начале XV века: Проблемы этнополитической истории Улуса Джучи (PDF) (in Russian). Казань: Фэн.
- Зайцев, И. В. (2004). Астраханское ханство (PDF) (in Russian). Москва: Восточная литература.
- Краснодубровский, С. С., ed. (1889). Труды Саратовской Ученой Архивной Коммиссіи. Томъ II, выпускъ I (in Russian). Саратовъ: Типо-литографія Н. П. Штерцеръ и К°.
- Варваровский, Ю. Е. (2008). Улус Джучи в 60–70-е годы XIV века (PDF) (in Russian). Казань: Институт истории им. Ш. Марджани АН РТ.
- Dzhanov, A. V. (2020). "The Tatar-Genoese Treaties of 1380 and 1381". Golden Horde Review. 8 (4): 675–713. doi:10.22378/2313-6197.2020-8-4.675-713.
- Сафаргалиев, М. Г. (1960). Распад Золотой Орды. Учёные записки (in Russian). Саранск: Мордовское книжное издательство.
- Landa, Ishayahu (2024). "Between the Chinggisid principle, loyalty, and self-aggrandisement: Jochid elites in the 'Time of Troubles' (1359 to circa 1380)". Journal of the Royal Asiatic Society. 35 (1). doi:10.1017/S1356186324000269.
