= Qaghan Beg =

Khan of the Golden Horde from 1375 to 1377

Qāghān Beg

Khan of the Golden Horde
- Reign: 1375–1377
- Predecessor: Urus Khan
- Successor: ʿArab Shāh
- Died: after 1380
- Issue: Maḥmūd Khwāja
- Dynasty: Borjigin
- Father: Īl Beg
- Religion: Sunni Islam

Qāghān Beg (Turki/Kypchak: قاغان بک; Persian: غیاث الدین) was Khan of the Golden Horde from 1375 to 1377. He held the traditional capital Sarai during a period of civil war among rival contenders for the throne. Throughout his reign, the westernmost portion of the Golden Horde was under the control of the beglerbeg Mamai and his puppet khan Muḥammad-Sulṭān, while the easternmost portion was under the control of Urus Khan and then his sons.

== Ancestry ==
Qāghān Beg was a descendant of Jochi's son Shiban. The Muʿizz al-ansāb and the Tawārīḫ-i guzīdah-i nuṣrat-nāmah give his descent as follows: Chinggis Khan - Jochi - Shiban - Bahadur - Jochi-Buqa - Bādāqūl - Ming-Tīmūr - Īl-Bīk - Qāghān-Bīk.

== Biography ==
Qāghān Beg's uncle Khayr Pūlād (or Mīr Pūlād) had reigned briefly in parts of the Golden Horde in 1362–1365, as had a cousin, Ḥasan Beg, in 1368–1369. Qāghān Beg's father Īl Beg ruled from Saray-Jük on the lower Ural in 1373–1374, and briefly seized the Golden Horde's traditional capital Sarai in 1374, before perishing in the struggle to hold it against the beglerbeg Mamai. According to Ibn Khaldun, Qāghān Beg (whom he calls Karī Khān), who may have been present with his father at Sarai, fled to his family lands east of the Ural. During his sojourn at Sarai, Īl Beg had left Saray-Jük in the hands of his nephew, Khayr Pūlād's son ʿArab Shāh. The cousins cooperated and, having regrouped, Qāghān Beg seized control of Sarai late in 1375, expelling from it yet another rival, the Tuqa-Timurid Urus Khan, who was ruler of the former Ulus of Orda and had taken Sarai in 1374. Unlike several of his predecessors, Qāghān Beg maintained himself at Sarai long enough to mint coins there.

Qāghān Beg was also able to intervene in the affairs of the Russian principalities, vassals of the Golden Horde. In this endeavor, he was competing with Mamai and his puppet khan Muḥammad-Sulṭān. The grand princes Dmitrij Ivanovič of Moscow and Dmitrij Konstantinovič of Nižnij Novgorod, having recently broken with Mamai, recognized Qāghān Beg as their suzerain, perhaps seeking favors from a ruler they perceived to be more amenable and less dangerous than Mamai. Accordingly, when Qāghān Beg instructed the two grand princes to make the governor of Bolghar, Asan (Ḥasan), submit to his authority in 1376, they readily set out on a campaign. This was successful, but the Russian rulers offended Qāghān Beg by extorting additional large sums for themselves from the vanquished. The enraged khan, lacking sufficient forces of his own, asked his cousin ʿArab Shāh to punish the Russian grand princes. ʿArab Shāh obliged, and set out against the two Dmitrijs, who joined forces to defend themselves. However, before the army of ʿArab Shāh could engage with them, and in the temporary absence of the Muscovites, Mamai succeeded in surprising and routing the Nižegorodians at the P'jana river, and proceeded to sack and burn Nižnij Novgorod in 1377. Unwilling to miss the opportunity to inflict his intended vengeance on the Russians and plunder them, or to allow Mamai to reassert his suzerainty over them,ʿArab Shāh proceeded with his campaign. Taking advantage of the confused and weakened state of the Russian princes, he successfully raided and plundered the territories of Nižnij Novgorod and Rjazan', even capturing the latter's capital in the autumn of 1377. Qāghān Beg did not, however, enjoy his triumph long. In late 1377, he was induced to abdicated in favor of his victorious and effective cousin ʿArab Shāh. With ʿArab Shāh on the throne of Sarai, Qāghān Beg was not only left alive, but appears to have been given rule over the Shibanid homelands to the east.

According to the Čingīz-Nāmah, the Tuqa-Timurid prince Tokhtamysh sought refuge with Qāghān Beg from his cousin, the aggressive Urus Khan, a common enemy. Neither realizing that Urus had just died (in 1377), Qāghān Beg granted Tokhtamysh lands at the estuary of the Tana (Don). Tokhtamysh attempted to incite Qāghān Beg to a common campaign against Mamai, but after initially inclining to action, Qāghān Beg decided against it. Disappointed by Qāghān Beg, Tokhtamysh left, but not before receiving generous presents and many horses from ʿArab Shāh. Subsequently, assisted by his protector Timur (Tamerlane), Tokhtamysh overthrew Urus Khan's heirs and made himself ruler of the former Ulus of Orda in 1379. He then demanded the submission of Qāghān Beg, who cautiously responded that he had to receive instructions to do so from his overlord, ʿArab Shāh. Tokhtamysh accordingly advanced on Sarai, demanding ʿArab Shāh's submission, which he received. Recognized as khan at Sarai and eliminating Mamai, Tokhtamysh showed generosity to both Qāghān Beg and ʿArab Shāh, rewarding Qāghān Beg with the same lands at the Tana estuary that he had previously given Tokhtamysh, and allowing ʿArab Shāh to rule the Ulus of Shiban. Qāghān Beg died, therefore, some time after 1380.

== Descendants ==
According to the Tawārīḫ-i guzīdah-i nuṣrat-nāmah, Qāghān Beg had a son, Maḥmūd Khwāja, who later ruled in Sibir and the Golden Horde in 1428–1430.

== Genealogy ==
- Genghis Khan
- Jochi
- Shiban
- Bahadur
- Jochi-Buqa
- Bādāqūl
- Ming-Tīmūr
- Īl Beg
- Qāghān Beg

== See also ==
- List of khans of the Golden Horde

== Bibliography ==
- Desmaisons, P. I. (transl.), Histoire des Mongols et des Tatares par Aboul-Ghâzi Béhâdour Khân, St Petersburg, 1871–1874.
- Gaev, A. G., "Genealogija i hronologija Džučidov," Numizmatičeskij sbornik 3 (2002) 9-55.
- Howorth, H. H., History of the Mongols from the 9th to the 19th Century. Part II.1. London, 1880.
- Judin, V. P., Utemiš-hadži, Čingiz-name, Alma-Ata, 1992.
- Počekaev, Roman Julianovich (2010a). Цари ордынские: биографии ханов и правителей Золотой Орды (Cari ordynskie: Biografii hanov i pravitelej Zolotoj Ordy) [Tsars of the Horde: Biographies of the Khans and Rulers of the Golden Horde]. Saint Petersburg: Eurasia. p. 406. ISBN 9785918520109.
- Počekaev, Roman Julianovich (2010b). Мамай: история "антигероя" в истории (Mamaj: Istorija “anti-geroja” v istorii) [Mamai: the story of an 'anti-hero' in history]. Saint Petersburg: Eurasia. p. 287. ISBN 9785918520208.
- Sabitov, Ž. M., Genealogija "Tore", Astana, 2008.
- Safargaliev, M. G., Raspad Zolotoj Ordy. Saransk, 1960.
- Sagdeeva, R. Z., Serebrjannye monety hanov Zolotoj Ordy, Moscow, 2005.
- Seleznëv, J. V., Èlita Zolotoj Ordy, Kazan', 2009.
- Sidorenko, V. A., "Hronologija pravlenii zolotoordynskih hanov 1357-1380 gg.," Materialov po arheologii, istorii i ètnografii Tavrii 7 (2000) 267–288.
- Tizengauzen, V. G. (trans.), Sbornik materialov, otnosjaščihsja k istorii Zolotoj Ordy. Izvlečenija iz arabskih sočinenii, republished as Istorija Kazahstana v arabskih istočnikah. 1. Almaty, 2005.
- Tizengauzen, V. G. (trans.), Sbornik materialov otnosjaščihsja k istorii Zolotoj Ordy. Izvlečenija iz persidskih sočinenii, republished as Istorija Kazahstana v persidskih istočnikah. 4. Almaty, 2006.
- Vernadsky, G., The Mongols and Russia, New Haven, 1953.
- Vohidov, Š. H. (trans.), Istorija Kazahstana v persidskih istočnikah. 3. Muʿizz al-ansāb. Almaty, 2006.

Qaghan Beg Borjigin
Regnal titles
Preceded by Urus Khan	Khan of the Golden Horde; 1375–1377	Succeeded by ʿArab Shāh
