= Arab Shah =

Khan of the Golden Horde from 1377 to 1380

ʿArab Shāh
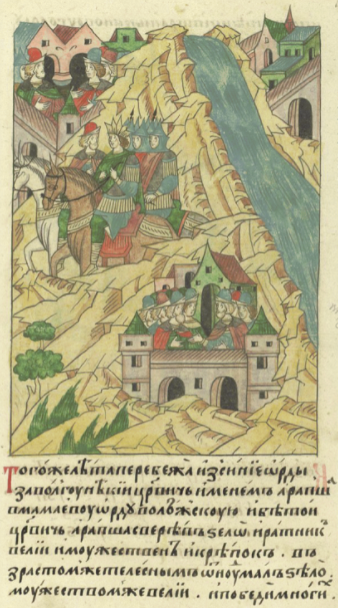
- ʿArab Shāh advances on Mamai, miniature from the Illustrated Chronicle of Ivan the Terrible (16th century)

Khan of the Golden Horde
- Reign: 1377–1380
- Predecessor: Qāghān Beg
- Successor: Tokhtamysh
- Died: after 1380
- Issue: Tuqluq Ḥājjī
- Dynasty: Borjigin
- Father: Khayr Pūlād
- Religion: Sunni Islam

ʿArab Shāh (Persian: عرب شاه, Turki/Kypchak: شاه عرب; Arapša in the Russian chronicles) was Khan of the Golden Horde from 1377 to 1380. He held the traditional capital Sarai during a period of civil war among rival contenders for the throne. Throughout his reign, the westernmost portion of the Golden Horde was under the control of the beglerbeg (governor-general) Mamai and his puppet khans, while the easternmost portion was under the control of the sons of Urus Khan and then Tokhtamysh.

== Ancestry ==
ʿArab Shāh was a descendant of Jochi's son Shiban. The Muʿizz al-ansāb and the Tawārīḫ-i guzīdah-i nuṣrat-nāmah give his descent as follows: Chinggis Khan - Jochi - Shiban - Bahadur - Jochi-Buqa - Bādāqūl - Ming-Tīmūr - Pūlād - ʿArab Shāh.

== Biography ==
ʿArab Shāh's father Pūlād is identified with Khayr-Pūlād (or Mīr-Pūlād), who had reigned briefly in parts of the Golden Horde in 1362–1365. Other rulers of the Golden Horde during this time of civil war had included ʿArab Shāh's cousin, Ḥasan Beg (1368–1369), an uncle, Īl Beg (1374), and another cousin, Qāghān Beg (1375–1377). When Īl Beg seized control of Sarai in 1374, he left his nephew ʿArab Shāh in charge of his original power base at Saray-Jük on the lower Ural. ʿArab Shāh retained this power base after his uncle perished later that year, and apparently provided refuge to his cousin, Īl Beg's son Qāghān Beg. The two cousins proceeded to cooperate against the new master of Sarai, the Tuqa-Timurid Urus Khan, ruler of the former Ulus of Orda. As a result, Qāghān Beg was able to recover Sarai and reign there in 1375–1377, while ʿArab Shāh retained Saray-Jük.

ʿArab Shāh appears to have remained Qāghān Beg's chief support. When Qāghān Beg was outraged at the impertinence of vassals, the Russian grand princes Dmitrij Ivanovič of Moscow and Dmitrij Konstantinovič of Nižnij Novgorod, he turned to ʿArab Shāh to punish them in a military campaign. ʿArab Shāh obliged readily, perhaps relishing the prospect of plunder as much as displaying family solidarity and loyalty to the khan. While ʿArab Shāh advanced on the Russian princes, however, a rival Mongol leader, the beglerbeg Mamai stole a march on his army, surprising and defeating the forces of Dmitrij Konstantinovič at the P'jana river, and sacking and burning Nižnij Novgorod in 1377. ʿArab Shāh pressed on, unwilling to waste his efforts and give up the prospect of chastisement and plunder, or to allow Mamai to re-establish his own dominance over the Russian princes. Taking advantage of the weakened state of his Russian opponents, ʿArab Shāh raided and plundered with great success in the lands of Nižnij Novgorod and Rjazan', culminating in the capture of Rjazan' itself (and its prince) in the autumn of 1377.

Flushed with success, ʿArab Shāh now induced his cousin Qāghān Beg to abdicate the throne of Sarai in his favor, in the autumn of 1377. Unlike the ruthless succession of depositions and killings that so frequently accompanied such changes on the throne, this transition appears to have been peaceful. Qāghān Beg was not only left alive, but appears to have been given rule over the Shibanid homelands to the east. As khan, ʿArab Shāh pursued an aggressive policy, perhaps driven by the need to bolster his followers' loyalty with success and wealth. On his orders, Dmitrij Ivanovič of Moscow and Dmitrij Konstantinovič of Nižnij Novgorod attacked Mamai's allies, the Mordvins in 1377, and forced them to recognize the suzerainty of ʿArab Shāh. In 1378 ʿArab Shāh himself suddenly attacked Mamai's vassal Tagai of Mokhshi, killed him, and subjugated the area. The same year, ʿArab Shāh turned on his Russian vassal Dmitrij Konstantinovič, apparently enraged that the latter had helped himself to the plunder of the Mordvins the year before. Rejecting Dmitrij Konstantinovič's offer of a ransom, ʿArab Shāh took and burned Nižnij Novgorod, which had suffered the same fate at the hands of Mamai a year earlier. ʿArab Shāh also ordered the confiscation of the wealth of Russian merchants in his domain, and their arrest and torture. Still in 1378, he launched a new campaign that attacked Rjazan' and reaped a harvest of captives and livestock.

According to the Čingīz-Nāmah, before his assumption of the throne, ʿArab Shāh had demonstrated favor and generosity to the refugee Tuqa-Timurid prince Tokhtamysh, who had fled from his hostile cousin, Urus Khan. Subsequently, assisted by his protector Timur (Tamerlane), Tokhtamysh overthrew Urus Khan's heirs and made himself ruler of the former Ulus of Orda in 1379. He then demanded the submission of ʿArab Shāh's cousin Qāghān Beg, who now governed the eastern domains of the Shibanids. Qāghān Beg replied that he had to receive instructions to do so from his suzerain, the current khan ʿArab Shāh. With Timur's friendship securing him in the rear, Tokhtamysh now advanced on Sarai with an army and demanded ʿArab Shāh's submission. Realizing the futility of opposing Tokhtamysh, ʿArab Shāh submitted and abdicated the throne of Sarai in favor of Tokhtamysh in 1380. The latter responded with generosity, not only sparing the lives of ʿArab Shāh and Qāghān Beg, but also investing them with lands: ʿArab Shāh was apparently given the Ulus of Shiban once more, while Qāghān Beg was given lands at the Tana (Don) estuary. ʿArab Shāh died some time after 1380, disappearing from the sources.

The Russian chronicles are mostly familiar with ʿArab Shāh in his role as a prince and commander before ascending the throne of Sarai. Given his defeat and plunder of the Russian princes, the chronicles naturally paint a negative picture of "a certain prince named Arapša... altogether ferocious, a great and sturdy warrior, mature and manly," who "caused much evil and returned home." On the other hand, ʿArab Shāh provided effective and energetic leadership and exhibited generosity, restraint, and cooperation with fellow Jochid princes both when in a position of strength (with Qāghān Beg) and when in a position of weakness (with Tokhtamysh). He thus appears to have contributed to the relative strengthening and stabilization of the Golden Horde evident under Tokhtamysh.

== Descendants ==
According to the Tawārīḫ-i guzīdah-i nuṣrat-nāmah and Abu'l-Ghāzī, ʿArab Shāh had a son, Tūqluq Ḥājjī (also called Ḥājjī Tūlī), father of Tīmūr Shaykh, father of the Uzbek khan Yādigār, who reigned in 1469–1472. Yādigār was the ancestor of the Shibanid khans of Khwarazm, later Khiva.

== Genealogy ==
- Genghis Khan
- Jochi
- Shiban
- Bahadur
- Jochi-Buqa
- Bādāqūl
- Ming-Tīmūr
- Khayr-Pūlād (Mīr-Pūlād)
- ʿArab Shāh

== See also ==
- List of khans of the Golden Horde

== Bibliography ==
- "Арабшах, хан Золотой орды" . Brockhaus and Efron Encyclopedic Dictionary (in Russian). 1906.
- Desmaisons, P. I. (transl.), Histoire des Mongols et des Tatares par Aboul-Ghâzi Béhâdour Khân, St Petersburg, 1871–1874.
- Gaev, A. G., "Genealogija i hronologija Džučidov," Numizmatičeskij sbornik 3 (2002) 9-55.
- Howorth, H. H., History of the Mongols from the 9th to the 19th Century. Part II.1, II.2. London, 1880.
- Judin, V. P., Utemiš-hadži, Čingiz-name, Alma-Ata, 1992.
- Počekaev, Roman Julianovich (2010a). Цари ордынские: биографии ханов и правителей Золотой Орды (Cari ordynskie: Biografii hanov i pravitelej Zolotoj Ordy) [Tsars of the Horde: Biographies of the Khans and Rulers of the Golden Horde]. Saint Petersburg: Eurasia. p. 406. ISBN 9785918520109.
- Počekaev, Roman Julianovich (2010b). Мамай: история "антигероя" в истории (Mamaj: Istorija “anti-geroja” v istorii) [Mamai: the story of an 'anti-hero' in history]. Saint Petersburg: Eurasia. p. 287. ISBN 9785918520208.
- Sabitov, Ž. M., Genealogija "Tore", Astana, 2008.
- Safargaliev, M. G., Raspad Zolotoj Ordy. Saransk, 1960.
- Sagdeeva, R. Z., Serebrjannye monety hanov Zolotoj Ordy, Moscow, 2005.
- Seleznëv, J. V., Èlita Zolotoj Ordy, Kazan', 2009.
- Sidorenko, V. A., "Hronologija pravlenii zolotoordynskih hanov 1357-1380 gg.," Materialov po arheologii, istorii i ètnografii Tavrii 7 (2000) 267–288.
- Tizengauzen, V. G. (trans.), Sbornik materialov, otnosjaščihsja k istorii Zolotoj Ordy. Izvlečenija iz arabskih sočinenii, republished as Istorija Kazahstana v arabskih istočnikah. 1. Almaty, 2005.
- Tizengauzen, V. G. (trans.), Sbornik materialov otnosjaščihsja k istorii Zolotoj Ordy. Izvlečenija iz persidskih sočinenii, republished as Istorija Kazahstana v persidskih istočnikah. 4. Almaty, 2006.
- Vernadsky, G., The Mongols and Russia, New Haven, 1953.
- Vohidov, Š. H. (trans.), Istorija Kazahstana v persidskih istočnikah. 3. Muʿizz al-ansāb. Almaty, 2006.

Arab Shah Borjigin
Regnal titles
Preceded by Qāghān Beg	Khan of the Golden Horde; 1377–1380	Succeeded by Tokhtamysh
