= Shayban =

Shayban can refer to:

- Shayban, an Arab tribe, prominent in the medieval Jazira
- Shiban, a 13th-century Mongol prince, grandson of Genghis Khan

== See also ==
- Shaybanids
