= Il Beg =

Khan of the Golden Horde (r. 1374)

Īl Beg

Khan of the Golden Horde
- Reign: 1374
- Predecessor: Ḥājjī Cherkes
- Successor: Muḥammad-Sulṭān
- Born: unknown
- Died: 1374
- Issue: Qāghān-Bīk
- Dynasty: Borjigin
- Father: Ming-Timur
- Religion: Sunni Islam

Īl Beg (Kypchak and Turki: ایل بیک) was an ephemeral khan of the Golden Horde in 1374, during a period of civil war. The westernmost portion of the Golden Hode was under the control of the beglerbeg Mamai and his puppet khan Muḥammad-Sulṭān, while the easternmost portion was under the control of Urus Khan. There is very little information about this ruler, but his name is found or rationalized in several different forms (including Ay Beg, Alp Beg, Īlbān, Èlbek).

== Ancestry ==
Īl Beg was a descendant of Jochi's son Shiban. The Muʿizz al-ansāb and the Tawārīḫ-i guzīdah-i nuṣrat-nāmah give his descent as follows: Chinggis Khan - Jochi - Shiban - Bahadur - Jochi-Buqa - Bādāqūl - Ming-Tīmūr - Īl-Bīk.

== Biography ==
It is not clear whether Īl Beg was at the head of the Ulus of Shiban when he made his bid for the throne of the Golden Horde. The later khan of Khwarazm and historian Abu'l-Ghāzī seems to list Īl Beg as the eldest son of Ming-Tīmūr, himself the only son of Bādāqūl. Īl Beg's brother Pūlād is identified with the Khayr-Pūlād (or Mīr-Pūlād), who had reigned briefly in parts of the Golden Horde in 1362–1365. A nephew, Ḥasan Beg, had ruled briefly in 1368-1369. Judging by the coinage, it would appear that Īl Beg made his bid for the throne from Saray-Jük on the lower Ural, and therefore on the eastern edge of the core territory of the Golden Horde, perhaps in 1373. Ibn Khaldun refers to Īl Beg (whom he calls Ay-Bak Khān) as a regional ruler, like several of his rivals. As a Shibanid, Īl Beg was presumably not disinclined to compete with his Tuqa-Timurid rivals for control of parts or all of the polity. When Urus Khan and Ḥājjī Cherkes of Astrakhan disputed possession of the Lower Volga in 1373–1374, Īl Beg briefly acquired control over the traditional capital of the Golden Horde, Sarai, in 1374; Ibn Khaldun indicates that Īl Beg displaced Ḥājjī Cherkes. But Īl Beg's manpower resources were inadequate to maintain control over Sarai, while his original power base required its own protection, under his nephew, Pūlād's son ʿArab Shāh. Meanwhile, the beglerbeg Mamai, whose protégé Muḥammad-Sulṭān had been expelled from Sarai by Urus Khan in the first place, had regrouped. Mamai now attacked and defeated Īl Beg, terminating his reign at Sarai. Since Īl Beg is not heard of again, it is assumed that he perished in the conflict, something that seems to be corroborated by Ibn Khaldun's phrasing. Saray-Jük remained the base of his nephew, ʿArab Shāh. However, it was Īl Beg's son Qāghān Beg who would be the first to reclaim Īl Beg's throne.

== Descendants ==
According to the Muʿizz al-ansāb, Īl Beg had four sons: Tawakkul-Khwāja, Ilyās-Ughlān, Uch-Qūrūqtā, and Qāghān-Bīk, who later assumed the throne.

== Genealogy ==
- Genghis Khan
- Jochi
- Shiban
- Bahadur
- Jochi-Buqa
- Bādāqūl
- Ming-Tīmūr
- Īl Beg

== See also ==
- List of khans of the Golden Horde

== Sources ==
- Desmaisons, P. I. (transl.), Histoire des Mongols et des Tatares par Aboul-Ghâzi Béhâdour Khân, St Petersburg, 1871–1874.
- Gaev, A. G., "Genealogija i hronologija Džučidov," Numizmatičeskij sbornik 3 (2002) 9-55.
- Howorth, H. H., History of the Mongols from the 9th to the 19th Century. Part II.1. London, 1880.
- Počekaev, R. J., Cari ordynskie: Biografii hanov i pravitelej Zolotoj Ordy. Saint Petersburg, 2010a.
- Počekaev, R. J., Mamaj: Istorija “anti-geroja” v istorii, Sankt-Peterburg, 2010b.
- Sabitov, Ž. M., Genealogija "Tore", Astana, 2008.
- Sagdeeva, R. Z., Serebrjannye monety hanov Zolotoj Ordy, Moscow, 2005.
- Seleznëv, J. V., Èlita Zolotoj Ordy, Kazan', 2009.
- Tizengauzen, V. G. (trans.), Sbornik materialov, otnosjaščihsja k istorii Zolotoj Ordy. Izvlečenija iz arabskih sočinenii, republished as Istorija Kazahstana v arabskih istočnikah. 1. Almaty, 2005.
- Tizengauzen, V. G. (trans.), Sbornik materialov otnosjaščihsja k istorii Zolotoj Ordy. Izvlečenija iz persidskih sočinenii, republished as Istorija Kazahstana v persidskih istočnikah. 4. Almaty, 2006.
- Vohidov, Š. H. (trans.), Istorija Kazahstana v persidskih istočnikah. 3. Muʿizz al-ansāb. Almaty, 2006.

Il Beg Borjigin (1206–1635)
Regnal titles
Preceded by Ḥājjī Cherkes	Khan of the Golden Horde; 1374	Succeeded by Muḥammad-Sulṭān
