= Mamai =

Mongol general and kingmaker (died 1380/1381)

- Beylerbey
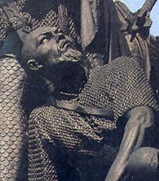
- Mamai on the Millennium of Russia monument in Veliky Novgorod
- Predecessor: ?
- Successor: Edigu
- Born: 1325?
- Died: 1380 (aged 54–55); Crimea
- Spouse: Berdi Beg's daughter, probably Tulun Beg Khanum
- Issue: Mansur Kiyat
- Dynasty: Kiyat
- Father: Alash Beg?
- Religion: Sunni Islam

Mamai (Mongolian: Мамай; Tatar: Мамай, romanized: Mamay; 1325?–1380/1381) was a powerful Turco-Mongol military commander who held the rank of beylerbey in the Golden Horde. He was from the Kiyat clan. Contrary to popular misconception, he was not a khan (king), but was a kingmaker for several khans, and dominated parts or all of the Golden Horde for almost two decades in the 1360s and 1370s. Although he was unable to stabilize central authority during the 14th-century Golden Horde war of succession known as the Great Troubles, Mamai remained a remarkable and persistent leader for decades, while others came and went in rapid succession. His defeat in the Battle of Kulikovo by an alliance of the Russian principalities marked the beginning of the decline of the Horde, as well as his own rapid downfall.

== Origins ==
Unlike the khans of the so-called Golden Horde, Mamai was not a descendant of Genghis Khan and his son Jochi, but belonged to the powerful Turco-Mongol Kiyat clan that branched from the Mongol Kiyat clan, which claimed descent from Mugetu Kiyan (Mūngdū Qayān), an older brother of Genghis Khan's father Yesugei Baghatur. While they served the rulers of the Golden Horde from at least Batu Khan, the Kiyats may have risen in importance after the fall of the rival khan Nogai in 1299. Abandoning Nogai in favor of the legitimate khan, Toqta, Aq-Buqa Kiyat enjoyed the favor of the khan and his successor, and served as one of the chief emirs. Another Kiyat, Isatai, was entrusted with governing the former ulus of Orda in the eastern part of the Golden Horde, by Öz Beg Khan. Isatai's son Jir-Qutluq and the latter's son Tingiz-Buqa enjoyed the same position under the next khans, Jani Beg and Berdi Beg. Specific information about Mamai's immediate origins is very limited, but his father is named as Alash Beg (possibly Ali Beg), probably the son Isatai. At least part of the clan may have been ensconced in the Crimea, perhaps since the early 14th century, before several Kiyats appeared as governor on the eastern periphery of the Golden Horde. The date of Mamai's birth can be estimated only generally, to somewhere in the mid-to-late 1320s. At birth, he appears to have received the Muslim name Muḥammad, sometimes paired with the nickname Kičik ("little"), perhaps due to his short stature. Whether "Mamai" is a variation of that name or an additional, "folk" name, remains unclear. According to contemporary Timurid source Nizam al-Din Shami’s Ẓafar-nāma Kiyats were called Uzbek: "chun hissa-yi ab-i khud bi-Uzbak dadi ki az nasl-i Qiyat ast, dar ulus-i Chaghatay zikr-i in makrumat baqi manad". Later sources, such as Majmu al-tawarikh [ru], included Kiyat clan as one of ninety-two Uzbek [ru] clans of the Golden Horde.

== Rise to power ==
Mamai became an emir during the reign of Jani Beg (1342–1357). After the governorship of Crimea at Solkhat had been held by a member of a different family in 1349–1356, it seems to have been conferred on Ali Beg, perhaps Mamai's father. He died soon after, and the governorship was given to his brother, Qutluq-Timur. He appears to have died by 1359, and the governorship was entrusted to a member of another clan, Qutluq-Buqa of the Kungrat, a brother of the chief emir (beglerbeg) Mogul-Buqa. Mamai appears to have resented this apparent slight, and left the capital Sarai with his dependents and clansmen, to assert himself locally in and near the Crimea.

Troubled by this desertion and possibly already threatened by a rival claimant to the throne (Qulpa), Khan Berdi Beg (1357–1359) apparently recalled Mamai to the court and named him chief emir (beglerbeg). Moreover, perhaps at this time Berdi Beg gave his daughter in marriage to Mamai. Although the explicit reference to the marriage by Ibn Khaldun only refers to the princess by title (Ḫānum), she has been plausibly identified as Tulun Beg Khanum, whom Mamai would later briefly elevate to the throne, and who would later yet marry Tokhtamysh Khan. Perhaps in keeping with tradition within the Golden Horde, Mamai (like Edigu after him) does not appear to have taken the title of Güregen, commonly taken by men marrying women descended from Genghis Khan. According to the contemporary traveler Ibn Khaldun, Mamai was now in charge of all government, while Russian chronicles note him sending emissaries to Moscow.

== Kingmaker after the death of Berdi Beg ==
The sudden (and probably violent) death of Berdi Beg in August 1359, and the resulting accession of Qulpa undermined Mamai's position of supremacy at court. Under Qulpa and his successor Nawruz Beg, Mogul-Buqa became beglerbeg again, confirming Mamai's exclusion from power at court, although his precise position and relations with the khans remains unclear. Still in control of at least part of the warriors associated with the Kiyat tribe, Mamai was apparently too powerful to eliminate. Until 1361, moreover, he may have had a formidable ally in his cousin governing the former Ulus of Orda. The elimination of Mamai's cousin, Tingiz-Buqa, by the local khan Qara-Noqai, may have threatened to undermine Mamai's safety and impelled him to act proactively. The murder of Khiḍr Khan, a descendant of Jochi's son Shiban, and the struggle among his kinsmen and rivals for possession of Sarai in 1361 gave Mamai the opportunity to do so. Since Mamai was not a descendant of Genghis Khan and Jochi in the male line, he assumed the role of kingmaker, promoting and supporting Jochid khans of his own choosing from a base in the Crimea and the western portion of Golden Horde. With Mamai's help, these khans sought to establish themselves at the capital Sarai, albeit with intermittent success. The precise origin of Mamai's protégés is nowhere stated clearly, and there has been a tendency to consider them descendants of Batu Khan. Nevertheless, the purge of the ruling family perpetrated by Mamai's father-in-law Berdi Beg in 1357 makes such identifications unlikely. A more plausible hypothesis identifies Mamai's puppet khans with a cluster of suitably-named princes listed among a "Crimean" branch of the descendants of Jochi's son Togai-Timur in the genealogical compendiums Muʿizz al-ansāb and Tawārīḫ-i guzīdah-i nuṣrat-nāmah. If this identification is accepted, Mamai's protégés as khans were as follows:

- ʿAbdallāh (= ʿAbdal, son of Mīnkāsar, son of Abāy, son of Kay-Timur, son of Togai-Timur, son of Jochi, son of Genghis Khan), khan 1361–1370; recognized at Sarai 1362, 1367–1368, and 1369–1370.
- Tūlūn-Bīk Khānum (daughter of Berdi Beg, wife of Mamai, later of Tokhtamysh), queen, recognized at Sarai 1370–1371, died 1386.
- Muḥammad-Sulṭān (= Muḥammad, son of ʿAbdal), khan 1370–1379, recognized at Sarai 1371–1373 and in 1374.
- Tūlāk (= Tawakkul, son of Tughluq Khwāja, brother of ʿAbdal), khan 1379–1380, never recognized at Sarai.

== Mamai and the Great Troubles in the Golden Horde ==
After briefly supporting the impostor who pretended to be Kildi Beg, son of Jani Beg, Mamai proclaimed his own khan, ʿAbdallāh, in the Crimea in 1361, and succeeded in installing him at Sarai in 1362. However, later the same year ʿAbdallāh was ejected from the city by Murād (or Mürid, 1362–1363), a brother of the former ruler Khiḍr Khan. He was expelled by Khayr-Pūlād (or Mīr-Pūlād, 1363–1364), and he by ʿAzīz Shaykh (1364–1367). All three were descendants of Jochi's son Shiban. Mamai's inability to hold Sarai in 1362 is possibly to be attributed with his preoccupation with his western front, where the Lithuanians had inflicted a defeat on the representatives of the Golden Horde at the Battle of Blue Waters. Despite some territorial losses, Mamai was able to curb the Lithuanian advance. This allowed him to regroup in the Crimea, suppress local opposition (by besieging Solkhat), and eventually to make another attempt on Sarai.

In 1367 Mamai took advantage of (and possibly engineered) the murder of Khan ʿAzīz Shaykh to reinstall Khan ʿAbdallāh at Sarai. However, Mamai was unable to enjoy his success for long. His rival Ḥājjī Cherkes, ruler of Astrakhan, struck at Mamai's power base in the Crimea, forcing him to leave Sarai and rush home. Meanwhile, Ḥājjī Cherkes proclaimed a khan of his own, Ūljāy-Timur, a descendant of Jochi's son Toqai-Timur, and advanced on Sarai. Khan ʿAbdallāh was once more expelled from the capital, and Ūljāy-Timur was enthroned there by Ḥājjī Cherkes in 1368. Mamai now repaid his rival in kind, attacking Ḥājjī Cherkes' power base Astrakhan. While Ḥājjī Cherkes was distracted with defending Astrakhan, his protégé Ūljāy-Timur lost the throne of Sarai to Ḥasan Beg (1368–1369), a nephew of the earlier khan Khayr-Pūlād, and thus a descendant of Jochi's son Shiban.

Mamai was determined to recover control of Sarai. He captured and executed the exiled Ūljāy-Timur and in 1369 managed to expel Ḥasan Beg from the city, once more enthroning Khan ʿAbdallāh. When the latter died in 1370, Mamai seems to have hesitated before making ʿAbdallāh's young son Muḥammad-Sulṭān khan, at least at Sarai. Accordingly, in 1370–1371 he had Sarai recognize as reigning queen, Tulun Beg Khanum, apparently Mamai's wife, the daughter of Khan Berdi Beg. Meanwhile, Mamai's Crimean headquarters already coined in the name of Muḥammad-Sulṭān. After suppressing opposition in Volga Bulgaria with the help of Dmitrij of Suzdal', Mamai felt secure enough to proclaim Muḥammad-Sulṭān khan at Sarai the end of 1371 or the beginning of 1372.

Mamai's success once again proved ephemeral. Perhaps during Mamai's absence, in 1373, Sarai attracted a new conqueror, Urus Khan, another descendant of Jochi's son Tuqa-Timur, who had become ruler of the former Ulus of Orda in the eastern portion of the Golden Horde. Urus appears to have ejected Mamai's protégé Muḥammad-Sulṭān from Sarai, only to lose the city immediately (if he ever held it at this point) after failing to dislodge Ḥājjī Cherkes from Astrakhan. This rivalry allowed another descendant of Shiban, Khayr-Pūlād's brother Īl Beg, to seize Sarai briefly in 1374. Mamai returned to Sarai, defeating and expelling Īl Beg, and reinstalling Muḥammad-Sulṭān in 1374. No sooner had Mamai succeeded in this task, that he was again forced to attend to a crisis on the western frontier, where the Lithuanians and Wallachians had defeated one of his lieutenants. As in 1362, his rapid response met with some success, but in the process he lost control of Sarai: Muḥammad-Sulṭān was expelled by again by Urus Khan in 1374. He lost the city in his turn in 1375, to Qāghān Beg, the son of Īl Beg. Qāghān Beg subsequently yielded the throne of Sarai to his cousin ʿArab Shāh, son of Khayr-Pūlād, in 1377. Finally, in 1380, ʿArab Shāh was forced to yield Sarai to Tokhtamysh, the eventual nemesis of both Urus Khan and Mamai.

After the ejection of Mamai's protégé Muḥammad-Sulṭān from Sarai in 1374, apart from a possible brief occupation of the city in either 1375 or 1376, Mamai and his puppet khans no longer controlled the traditional capital of the Golden Horde. Nevertheless, they still exercised authority in the lands north, west, and south of the city, and in 1375 Mamai was able to have his khan recognized at Astrakhan, following the death of his old rival Ḥājjī Cherkes. Mamai's attempt to retain suzerainty over the Russian princes, however, was successfully challenged and undermined by the new Khan ʿArab Shāh, who in 1378 defeated and killed Mamai's subordinate ally Tagai, the governor of Mokhshi. Continued reverses in Volga Bulgaria and Russia (see below) threatened Mamai's position, and perhaps because of this he disposed of his puppet khan Muḥammad-Sulṭān and replaced him with a new protégé, Tūlāk, by February 1379.

== Mamai and overseas: Mamluks and Italians ==
During the 1370s, Mamai reestablished the traditional friendly relations between the Golden Horde and Mamluk Egypt, on behalf of his khan. Closer to home, he was in frequent diplomatic contact or armed conflict with the Italian merchant colonies in the Crimea and, more generally, the northern shores of the Black Sea. The rivalry between Venetians and Genoese exacerbated the difficulties involved in these relations. When the Venetians of Tana supported Kildi Beg as khan, Mamai punished their leadership, including the Venetian consul Jacopo Corner. Subsequently, he sought to improve relations with them by granting them a lower tribute in a diploma issued in the name of his khan, ʿAbdallāh, in 1362. Later, in 1369, Mamai lowered the Venetian tribute even more, restoring the amount paid before the wars between Öz Beg and Jani Beg and the Italians. Mamai, moreover, allowed the Venetians to build fortifications at Tana: they built a small fortress in 1370, which they expanded in 1375, to protect themselves from their Genoese rivals. Mamai's interactions with the Genoese appear to have been more frequent. In the early 1370s the relations were peaceful, and in 1374 Mamai himself was received with honor in Genoese Caffa. To maintain his good relations with the Genoese, Mamai went as far as to ignore their seizure of Soldaia from the Prince of Gothia, one of his vassals. After his loss of Sarai in 1374, Mamai became more concerned about these Genoese gains in the Crimea, confiscated Soldaia and other settlements that had been taken over by the Genoese, and proceeded to fortify his administrative center at Solkhat. Mamai may have shown favor to the Pisan colony at Porto Pisano on the Don, on the north coast of the Sea of Azov.

== Mamai and Lithuania ==
Perhaps to offset the economic influence of the Italian merchants, Mamai also granted diplomas to merchants from Polish Cracow in 1372 and from its rival, Galician L'vov, in 1379. Relations with Lithuania, ruled by Algirdas (1345–1377) and Jogaila (1377–1434) were dominated by diplomatic and military concerns. On at least two occasions, in 1362 and 1374, Mamai lost control over Sarai, because he and the bulk of his forces had to rush to the western frontier to oppose Lithuanian advances from the northwest. Although for the most part he managed to stem these advances, Mamai lost territory to Lithuania, most notably the Podolia following the Lithuanian victory at the Battle of Blue Waters in 1362. The influence or overlordship of the Golden Horde in Moldavia also ended about this time, the principality becoming autonomous, albeit under Hungarian and Lithuanian influence. While the Lithuanians were exploiting the troubles within the Golden Horde to their advantage, Mamai appears to have attempted to do the same during the competition for power within Lithuania after the death of Algirdas in 1377 between his brother and son: in 1380 the Lithuanian prince Aleksandras Karijotaitis fell in battle against the Mongols. Algirdas' son Jogaila eventually decided that he needed Mongol support against his uncle, and sent an envoy to Mamai to make peace and arrange for an alliance between them.

Mamai could benefit from his new Lithuanian alliance to keep the Russians in line, especially as the prince of Moscow, also grand prince of Vladimir became increasingly recalcitrant and refused to pay his heavy tribute in silver to the Mongols. Military operations and raids for plunder yielded limited results. Although some other Russian princes did continue to pay their tribute (most notably that of Tver'), Mamai sought alternatives to make up for the lost influx of silver. One was to use gold obtained in long distance trade with India to mint coins for commerce with the Italians.

== Attempts to control the Russian principalities ==
Early in his political career, Mamai may have assisted in the diplomatic initiative that secured the liberation of the Metropolitan Aleksej from Lithuanian captivity, and his return to Moscow in 1360. Even while ejected from Sarai in 1363, Mamai, in the name of his puppet khan ʿAbdallāh, sought to secure the service and tribute of the Russian princes, and to that end he came to an arrangement with Dmitrij of Moscow and the Metropolitan Aleksej, lowering the amount of tribute owed to the khan; the prince of Moscow was also confirmed in his possession of Rostov. The rival khan Murād accordingly invested another Russian prince, Dmitrij Konstantinovič of Suzdal', as grand prince of Vladimir. Similarly, Mamai and Khan ʿAzīz Shaykh supported rival claimants for the throne of Nižnij Novgorod in 1365; in this instance, Mamai supported Dmitrij Konstantinovič, who subsequently helped Mamai subdue opposition in Volga Bulgaria in 1370. The struggle for supreme authority in the Golden Horde thus presented the Russian princes with both challenges and opportunities.

In 1370, Mamai shifted his favor from Dmitrij of Moscow (who had failed to assist Mamai's cause in Volga Bulgaria) to the prince of Tver' Mihail Aleksandrovič, who was duly invested as grand prince of Vladimir. Dmitrij did not yield the grand princely throne, and in fact attacked Mihail as he was returning from Sarai, forcing him to flee to his brother-in-law Algirdas of Lithuania. Although the Lithuanians took up Mihail's cause and besieged Moscow in December 1370, the siege was lifted by the arrival of Dmitrij's allies. The Lithuanians returned home, while Mihail went to Sarai to seek Mamai's help. He received a second investiture with the grand princely throne of Vladimir in early 1371, but was refused entry into Vladimir by the inhabitants. Dmitrij ignored Mamai's instructions to submit to Mihail, but soon presented himself before Mamai with gifts, and secured his own confirmation as grand prince of Vladimir. In effect, Mamai had forced the princes of Moscow and Tver' to bid for the throne of Vladimir with gifts, which enriched Mamai and his followers. This opportunistic policy did not, however, solidify Mamai's control over the Russian princes, and in 1373 Dmitrij of Moscow assumed an ambivalent attitude during Mamai's raid into the lands of Rjazan'.

Mamai lost the cooperation of the Russian princes, and especially Dmitrij of Moscow, after his loss of Sarai in 1374. Dmitrij may have felt the need or opportunity to refuse Mamai's demands for tribute, as his influx of silver from Hanseatic trade in the Baltic declined, while the Golden Horde was apparently impacted by an outbreak of plague. Emboldened by the attitude of Moscow, Nižnij Novgorod arrested and beat Mamai's envoys in 1374. Mamai retaliated by raiding the lands of Nižnij Novgorod and sacking Novosil' in 1375; he also invested Mihail of Tver' with the title of grand prince of Vladimir once again. Dmitrij immediately besieged Tver' and secured Mihail's renunciation of the elusive claim, while signing a defense pact against the Mongols. By 1376, most Russian princes transferred their obedience to Qāghān Beg and his cousin ʿArab Shāh, serving them in a punitive expedition in Volga Bulgaria. When the Russian princes helped themselves to local wealth without authorization, they risked the khan's wrath, and in 1377 the Moscow and Nižnij Novgorod joined forces to defend themselves against their new overlord. But while ʿArab Shāh prepared to engage them, and in the absence of the Muscovite forces, Mamai intervened (assisted by the Mordva), defeated the Nižegorodians at the P'jana river, and then sacked and burned Nižnij Novgorod in 1377. Unwilling to see his overlordship over the Russian princes pass back to Mamai, ʿArab Shāh raided through Suzdalia and sacked Rjazan'.

== Three final defeats: Vozha, Kulikovo, Kalka ==
In 1378, Mamai dispatched an army under several emirs against Rjazan', which had not yet recovered from the raid of ʿArab Shāh the previous year. Oleg Ivanovič, the prince of Rjazan' was unable to offer resistance, but Dmitrij of Moscow decided to oppose the Mongols. As they were crossing the Voža river on 11 August 1378, the Mongols were beset on three sides by the Muscovites, defeated, and turned to flight. The battle was Dmitrij's first victory against the Mongols, and resulted in heavy losses among the Mongol warriors and even commanders. Humiliated and irritated, Mamai led another raid on Rjazan', once more sacking the city.

Perhaps trying to recover his position by diplomacy, Mamai next showed favor to the Muscovite candidate for the newly vacant metropolitan throne, Archimandrite Mihail, granting him a diploma from the khan in February 1379, long before he could be appointed metropolitan by the Ecumenical Patriarch of Constantinople. The friendly gesture did not yield the desired results, and Mihail perished during the sea voyage from Caffa to Constantinople. Mamai also made one more attempt to turn the Russian princes against each other, sending a renegade Muscovite boyar to incite Mihail of Tver' against Dmitrij of Moscow; the plan failed when he was recognized and arrested at Serpuhov, to be publicly executed in Moscow at the end of August 1379.

His other plans having failed, Mamai sent an ultimatum to Dmitrij of Moscow, demanding that the grand prince submit and pay an increased tribute to Mamai's new khan, Tūlāk. Dmitrij failed to accede to the demand, and Mamai prepared for war. He sought out the support of Jogaila of Lithuania and was also assured of the cooperation of Oleg Ivanovič of Rjazan'. While Mamai was still gathering his forces (including mercenaries from Transcaucasia and Genoese Crimea), an alliance of Russian forces under Dmitrij of Moscow, excluding the princes of Tver' and Rjazan', crossed southward into Mongol territory in an anticipatory advance. Abandoning their usual defence strategy, the Russian forces suddenly attacked Mamai's army on 8 September 1380 at Kulikovo Field on the banks of the Neprjadva river near the Don. Mamai's mercenaries were perhaps poorly coordinated, although they offered determined resistance. Mamai's puppet khan failed to reach safety and was forced to fight, perishing in the engagement. Much of Mamai's force failed to engage before a Russian ambush regimen turned the tide of the battle definitively in Dmitrij's favor. Mamai's forces routed and he fled the battlefield, leaving it in the hands of Dmitrij, who was later called Donskoj ("of the Don") in memory of his victory.

While Mamai was concentrating on Russian affairs, a descendant of Jochi's son Tuqa-Timur named Tokhtamysh was rising to power in the east. Having already challenged his cousin Urus Khan, he sought the protection and support of Timur (Tamerlane), and then proceeded to replace Urus' sons as ruler of the former Ulus of Orda by 1379. In early 1380, Tokhtamysh was able to advance on Sarai and to obtain the submission and abdication of Khan ʿArab Shāh. The advance of Tokhtamysh, and his continued success (he conquered Astrakhan later in 1380), sabotaged Mamai's hopes of avenging his defeat at Kulikovo. Mamai was now forced to oppose Tokhtamysh on the Kalka River. Perhaps at the head of larger and better-rested forces, Mamai could hope for victory. However, he now lacked a legitimate khan to use as his protégé, and at any rate Tokhtamysh had already begun to suborn some of Mamai's emirs. In the resulting battle, many of Mamai's commanders deserted to Tokhtamysh together with their troops. Mamai fled the battlefield with his remaining loyal supporters, but lost his harem and much of his possessions to the victor.

== Death ==
Mamai and his retinue made their way to the Crimea. Mistrusting the loyalty and ability of his governors there, Mamai decided to seek refuge in Genoese Caffa. However, fearing the wrath of Tokhtamysh, the city's commune refused to admit Mamai within the walls. Still pursued by Tokhtamysh's agents, Mamai now headed to his old headquarters at Solkhat. Here, too, he was refused admittance: the population and the governor, Qutluq-Buqa, did not want to provoke Tokhtamysh. Besides, the governor hoped to preserve his position under the new ruler, while the populace resented the heavy taxes Mamai had levied to fortify the city. At the end of 1380 or the beginning of 1381, the agents of Tokhtamysh caught up with Mamai outside Solkhat and killed him. Nevertheless, he was given an honorable burial by order of Tokhtamysh. The death of Mamai paved the way for Tokhtamysh to attempt the reunification of the Golden Horde.

== Purported descendants: Princes Glinski ==
Mamai's son Mansur Kiyat entered the service of Tokhtamysh; his son Aleksandr, who had converted to Christianity, entered the service of Vytautas of Lithuania and was made prince of Glinsk with multiple estates around the modern city of Poltava (Ukraine). This is supposed to have occurred in the early 15th century, although the first documented mention of the Glinski princes dates to 1437. Mihail L'vovič Glinskij was the most illustrious member of the family: he studied at the German university, took part as a knight in the Italian Wars, was the most powerful man in Lithuania in the 16th century, but later rebelled and ran away with his brothers to Muscovy and helped the Russians to retake the city of Smolensk. His niece Elena Glinskaya was married to Vasilij III of Moscow, and Ivan the Terrible was their son.

- Mamai (d. 1380/1381)
  - Mansur Kiyat
    - Aleksandr (died after 1399)
      - Ivan Aleksandrovič m. Anastasija Danilovna Ostrožskaja
        - Fëdor Ivanovič
        - Semën Ivanovič
          - Fëdor Semënovič
            - Bogdan Fëdorovič (d. 1506/1512)
        - Boris Ivanovič (d. after 1451)
          - Lev Borisovič
            - Ivan L'vovič (d. before 1522)
              - Aleksandr Ivanovič
            - Mihail L'vovič (d. 1534) m. Elena Ivanovna Telepneva-Obolenskaja
              - Vasilij Mihajlovič (d. 1565)
            - Vasilij L'vovič (d. 1515) m. Ana Jakšić
              - Jurij Vasil'evič (d. 1547) m. Ksenija Vasil'evna
              - Mihail Vasil'evič (d. 1559)
                - Ivan Mihajlovič (d. 1602) m. Anna Grigor'evna Skuratova
                  - Anna Ivanovna
              - Elena Vasil'evna (d. 1538) m. Vasilij III Ivanovič of Russia (d. 1533)
                - Ivan IV Vasil'evič of Russia (d. 1584) m. Anastasija Romanovna
                  - Fëdor I Ivanovič of Russia (d. 1598) of Russia m. Irina Fëdorovna Godunova
                    - Feodosija Fëdorovna (d. 1594)
          - Grigorij Borisovič
          - Ivan Borisovič

== Bibliography ==
- "Мамай" . Brockhaus and Efron Encyclopedic Dictionary (in Russian). 1906.
- Favereau, Marie; Pochekaev, Roman Yu. (2023). "The Golden Horde, c. 1260–1502". The Cambridge History of the Mongol Empire. Cambridge University Press. pp. 243–318. ISBN 978-1-107-11648-1.
- Gaev, A. G., "Genealogija i hronologija Džučidov: K vyjasneniju rodoslovija numizmatičeski zafiksirovannyh pravitelej Ulusa Džuči," Drevnosti Povolž'ja i drugih regionov 4: Numizmatičeskij sbornik 3 (2002) 9–55.
- Howorth, H. H., History of the Mongols from the 9th to the 19th century, Part II.1, London, 1880.
- Jackson, P., The Mongols and the West, 1221–1410, London, 2005.
- Martin, J., Medieval Russia, 980–1584, Cambridge, 1995.
- Mirgaleev, I. M., Političeskaja istorija Zolotoj Ordy perioda pravlenija Toktamyš-hana, Kazan', 2003.
- Počekaev, Roman Julianovich (2010b). Мамай: история "антигероя" в истории (Mamaj: Istorija "anti-geroja" v istorii) [Mamai: the story of an 'anti-hero' in history]. Saint Petersburg: Eurasia. p. 287. ISBN 9785918520208.
- Sagdeeva, R. Z., Serebrjannye monety hanov Zolotoj Ordy, Moscow, 2005.
- Sidorenko, V. A., "Hronologija pravlenii zolotoordynskih hanov 1357–1380 gg.," Materialov po arheologii, istorii i ètnografii Tavrii 7 (2000) 267–288.
- Varvarovskij, J. E., Ulus Džuči v 60–70-e gody XIV veka, Kazan', 2008; posthumously published version of author's dissertation Raspad Ulusa Džuči v 60–70-e gody XIV veka (po dannym pis'mennyh istočnikov i numizmatiki, Kazan', 1994.
- Vernadsky, G., The Mongols and Russia, New Haven, 1953.
- Vohidov, Š. H. (trans.), Istorija Kazahstana v persidskih istočnikah. 3. Muʿizz al-ansāb. Almaty, 2006.

Preceded by Nogai Khan	Military Leader of Blue Horde; 1361 – 1380	Succeeded by Edigu
