= Perevozsky District =

Perevozsky District Перевозский район (Russian)
- District
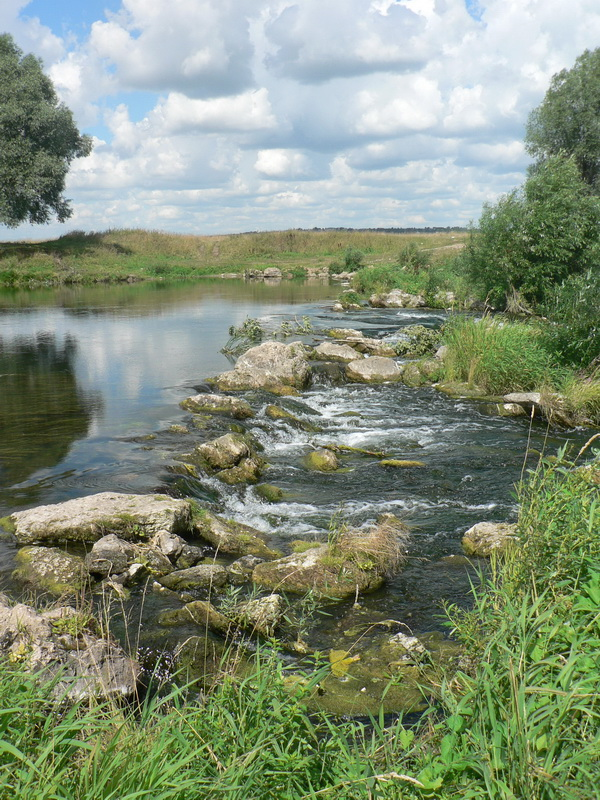
- The rapids of the Pyana River in Perevoz

- Flag Coat of arms
- Location of Perevozsky District in Nizhny Novgorod Oblast
- Coordinates: 55°36′N 44°33′E
- Country: Russia
- Federal subject: Nizhny Novgorod Oblast
- Established: 1935
- Administrative center: Perevoz

Area
  - Total: 769.2 km^{2} (297.0 sq mi)

Population (2010 Census)
  - Total: 16,519
  - Density: 21.48/km^{2} (55.62/sq mi)
  - Urban: 55.7%
  - Rural: 44.3%

Administrative structure
  - Administrative divisions: 1 Towns of district significance, 7 Selsoviets
  - Inhabited localities: 1 cities/towns, 52 rural localities

Municipal structure
  - Municipally incorporated as: Perevozsky Municipal District
  - Municipal divisions: 1 urban settlements, 7 rural settlements
- Time zone: UTC+3 (MSK)
- OKTMO ID: 22644000
- Website: http://www.perevozadm.ru

Perevozsky District (Russian: Перево́зский райо́н) is an administrative district (raion), one of the forty in Nizhny Novgorod Oblast, Russia. Municipally, it is incorporated as Perevozsky Municipal District. It is located in the southern central part of the oblast. The area of the district is 769.2 square kilometers (297.0 sq mi). Its administrative center is the town of Perevoz. Population: 16,519 (2010 Census); 18,024 (2002 census); 17,146 (1989 Soviet census). The population of Perevoz accounts for 55.7% of the district's total population.

== History ==
The district was established in 1935.

== Notable residents ==
- Patriarch Nikon of Moscow (1605–1681), born in the village of Valmanovo
- Sergey Safronov (1919–1983), aviator, Hero of the Soviet Union, born in Pilekshevo
- Gennady Yanayev (1937–2010), Soviet politician, born in Perevoz
