= Perevoz, Republic of Bashkortostan =

Perevoz Перевоз
- Village
- Location within Bashkortostan Location within Russia
- Coordinates: 56°07′N 59°18′E
- Country: Russia
- Region: Bashkortostan
- District: Belokataysky District
- Time zone: UTC+5:00

Perevoz (Russian: Перевоз) is a rural locality (a village) in Belyankovsky Selsoviet, Belokataysky District, Bashkortostan, Russia. The population was 6 as of 2010. There are 2 streets.

== Geography ==
Perevoz is located 59 km northeast of Novobelokatay (the district's administrative centre) by road. Tashkinova is the nearest rural locality.
