= Blue Horde =

Mongol horde of the 13th-14th centuries

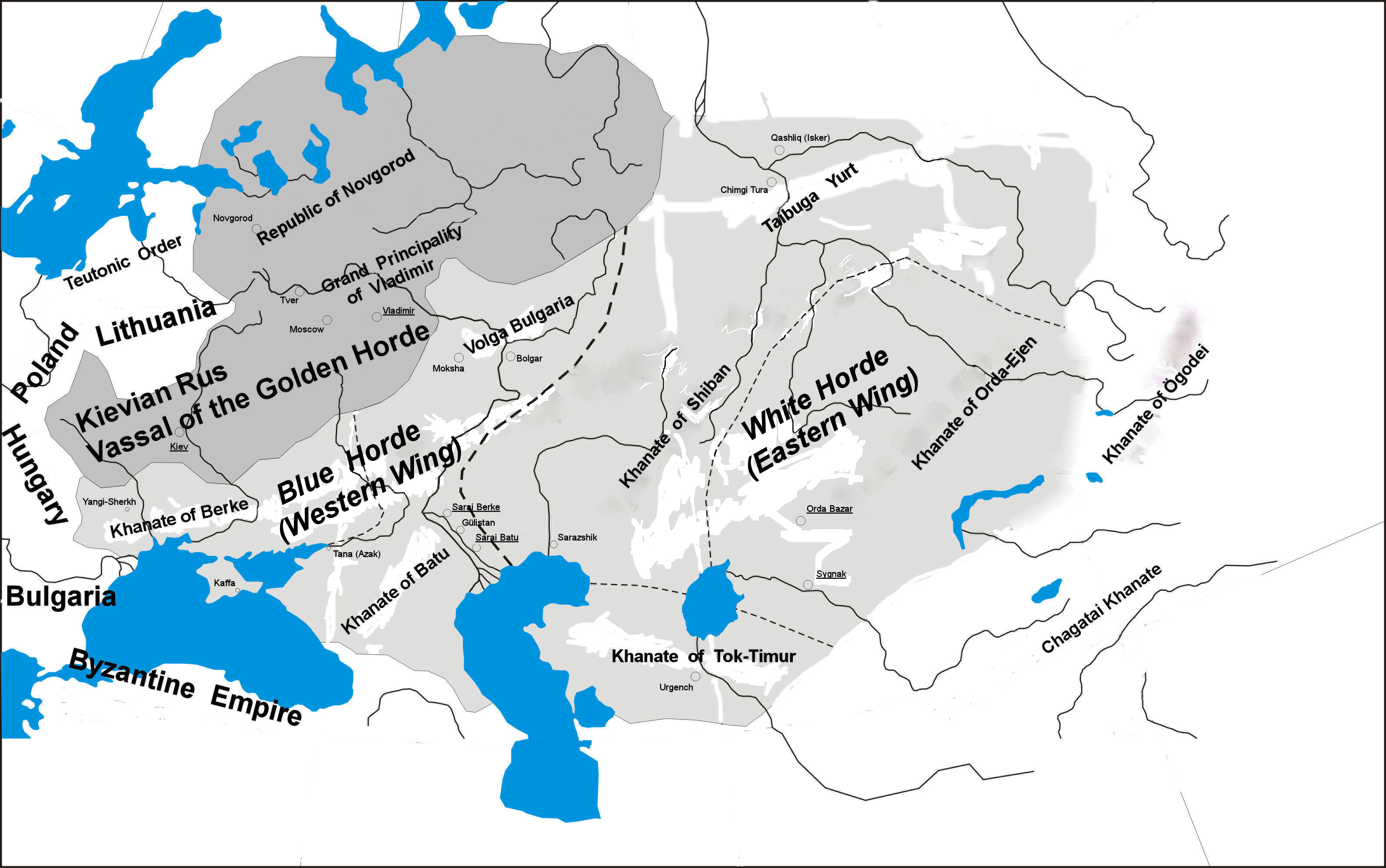
Blue Horde (Western Wing)

The Blue Horde was a crucial component of the Mongol Empire established after Genghis Khan's demise in 1227. Functioning as the eastern part of the split Golden Horde, it contrasted with the White Horde's western segment (see the Turkic cardinal system), adhering to the Mongolian and Turkic tradition of cardinal direction colors.

== The problem of identifying the color of the hordes ==
In historiography, there are contradictory uses of the color terminology in medieval sources.

=== The Eastern part of the Golden Horde ===
According to the traditional point of view in Russian chronicles, the Blue Horde is seen as the eastern part of the Golden Horde, which was being found in the allegiance on west, and which was being governed by the descendants of Orda Khan. After the succession struggle of Batu's line in the 1360's, known as the "Great Troubles", the authority of both parts of the Golden Horde was passed to the eastern Jochids.

According to Russian chronicles, the Blue Horde was located to the east of the Volga and is mentioned twice: the first time in connection with the great troubles, which was completed by the accession of Tokhtamysh ("tsar from blue horde"), and the second – with the invasion of Timur in 1395.

[...]In the horde: to powerful khan, Temir Aksak, from the East, from Blue Horde, the land of Samarkhiyskia, and is much confusion and mutiny to voivods in the horde and in Russia by his advent. [...]Neither king, son of king nor his tribe existed within its noyans, but such from the simple poor people, the common Tatars from Blue Horde, to the Iron Gate.

=== The Western part of the Golden Horde ===
According to the less popular and alternative point of view, the Blue Horde, on the contrary, corresponds to the western part of the Jochid Ulus (Golden Horde). This opinion is based on the literal movement to information of Persian composition of the XV century "Muntakhab atm-tavarikh- namu" by Muin ad-Din Natanzi (in the contemporary literature it still there is "by the anonymous author Of iskandera"). It is said after story about the administration of the Golden Horde khan Toqta (r. 1291–1312) in this work:

"After him, the ulus of Jochi was divided into two parts. Those, which relate to the left wing, i.e., the limits of ulug]-taga, Sekiz-yagacha and Karatala to the limits of Tuysena, environments of Jend and Barchkenda, were affirmed after the descendants [Nogai], and they began to be called by the sultans of Ak-Horde; however, the right wing, which includes Ibir-Sibir, Russian, Libka, Ukek, Madzhar, Bulgar, Bashgird and Srai-Berke, was given to descendants [Tokhta], and they named them the sultans of Blue Horde.

However, as showed the contemporary studies, they are in all probability incorrectly understood, since in the Persian tradition blue and white colors indicate the opposite sides of light in comparison with the Turkish and the Mongolian.

=== One of the parts of Eastern part of the Golden Horde ===
In Kazakhstan, this conventional is the third point of view, according to which the division into White and Blue Hordes' relates only to the eastern part of the Jochid Ulus. Accordingly, the Blue Horde is understood as appanage of Shiban, another son of Jochi, which located between the right wing of the Golden horde and the horde of Orda Khan (in the territory of modern western Kazakhstan).

== Foundation ==
Batu Khan effectively founded the Blue Horde upon the withdrawal from Europe in 1242 and by 1245, Sarai, the capital of the Blue Horde had been founded on the lower Volga. At the same time, the eastern lands of the Golden Horde were administered by Batu's older brother Orda, and these came to be known as the White Horde. Batu asserted his control over the Russian principalities after sacking the cities of Vladimir in 1238 and Kiev in 1240, forcing them to pay annual tribute and accept his nominations as princes.

== Golden Age ==
The Blue Horde stretched from the Ural River to the mouths of the Danube and the Carpathian. It exacted tribute from most of the Russian principalities and carried raids as far west as Poland and as far south as Iran and Bulgaria.

Starting with the conversion of Berke to Islam, the Blue Horde made a traditional alliance with the Mamluks of Egypt against their common rival, the Il-Khans.

From the 1280s until 1299, the Blue Horde was effectively under the control of two khans, the legitimate khans and Nogai Khan, a warlord and kingmaker, who made an alliance with the Byzantine Empire and invaded countries bordering the Blue Horde, particularly in the Balkans. Nogai's pre-eminence was ended by the assertion of the legitimate Khan Toqta, and the Blue Horde reached the apex of its power and prosperity during the reigns of Uzbeg Khan (Öz Beg) and his son Jani Beg in the middle of the 14th century, when it intervened in the affairs of the disintegrating Ilkhanate.

== Fall ==
The Blue Horde remained strong from its foundation (around 1240) until the 1350s. Problems in the west of the horde led to the eventual losses of Wallachia, Dobruja, Moldavia and the western Ukraine and the vassal principalities west of Kiev, losing those lands to Lithuania after being defeated by its army in the Battle of Blue Waters in 1362, and Poland. The death of Jani Beg led to the Blue Horde entering into a prolonged civil war, with concurrent khans fighting each other and holding no real power. At the same time, Mamai turned kingmaker in the Blue Horde. During this time, Vasily I of Moscow took advantage of the infighting and stopped paying tribute to the Horde, though the Horde still carried out some attacks on Moscow such as a raid in 1408.

It was not until the coming of Tokhtamysh that the concurrent khans were removed. He united the Blue Horde with his own White Horde and created the Golden Horde in 1380. The Blue Horde merged into both the other hordes, yet never really went away until finally the Golden Horde was defeated.

== Additional reading ==
- Boris Grekov and Alexander Yakubovski, "The Golden Horde and its Downfall".
- George Vernadsky, "The Mongols and Russia".

== See also ==
- Mongol invasion of Europe
- Wings of the Golden Horde
- List of khans of the Golden Horde
