= List of people known as the Just =

The Just is an epithet that may refer to:

== People ==
- Aristides (530 BC-468 BC), Athenian statesman
- Casimir II the Just (1138–1194), Duke of Wiślica, Duke of Sandomierz, Duke of Kraków and High Duke of Poland
- Childebert III (670 or probably 683–711), King of the Franks
- Diarmaid the Just (died 542), Irish abbot and saint
- Ferdinand I of Aragon (1380–1416), King of Aragon, Valencia, Majorca, Sardinia and (nominally) Corsica, and King of Sicily
- Ferdinand VI (1713–1759), King of Spain
- Harun al-Rashid (reigned 786–809), 5th Abbasid caliph of the Arab Caliphate
- James II of Aragon (1267–1327), King of Sicily (as James I), King of Aragon and Valencia, Count of Barcelona, King of Sardinia and Corsica
- Khosrow I (died 579), also known as Anushiravan the Just, twentieth Sassanid Emperor (Great King) of Persia
- Louis XIII (1601–1643), King of France and Navarre
- Matthias Corvinus (1443–1490), King of Hungary and Croatia, King of Bohemia, and Duke of Austria
- Menander II (fl. 90–85 BC), Indo-Greek ruler
- Peter of Castile (1334–1369), King of Castile and León
- Peter I of Portugal (1320–1367), King of Portugal and the Algarve
- Rev I of Iberia (189–216), King of a Georgian Kingdom of Iberia
- Simeon the Just (fl. 3rd century BCE), a Jewish High Priest during the time of the Second Temple

== Biblical or fictional characters ==
- James, brother of Jesus (died 62 or 69), a figure in early Christianity
- Edmund Pevensie, in C. S. Lewis's The Chronicles of Narnia
