= Perevoz, Nizhny Novgorod Oblast =

Town in Nizhny Novgorod Oblast, Russia

Perevoz Перевоз
- Town
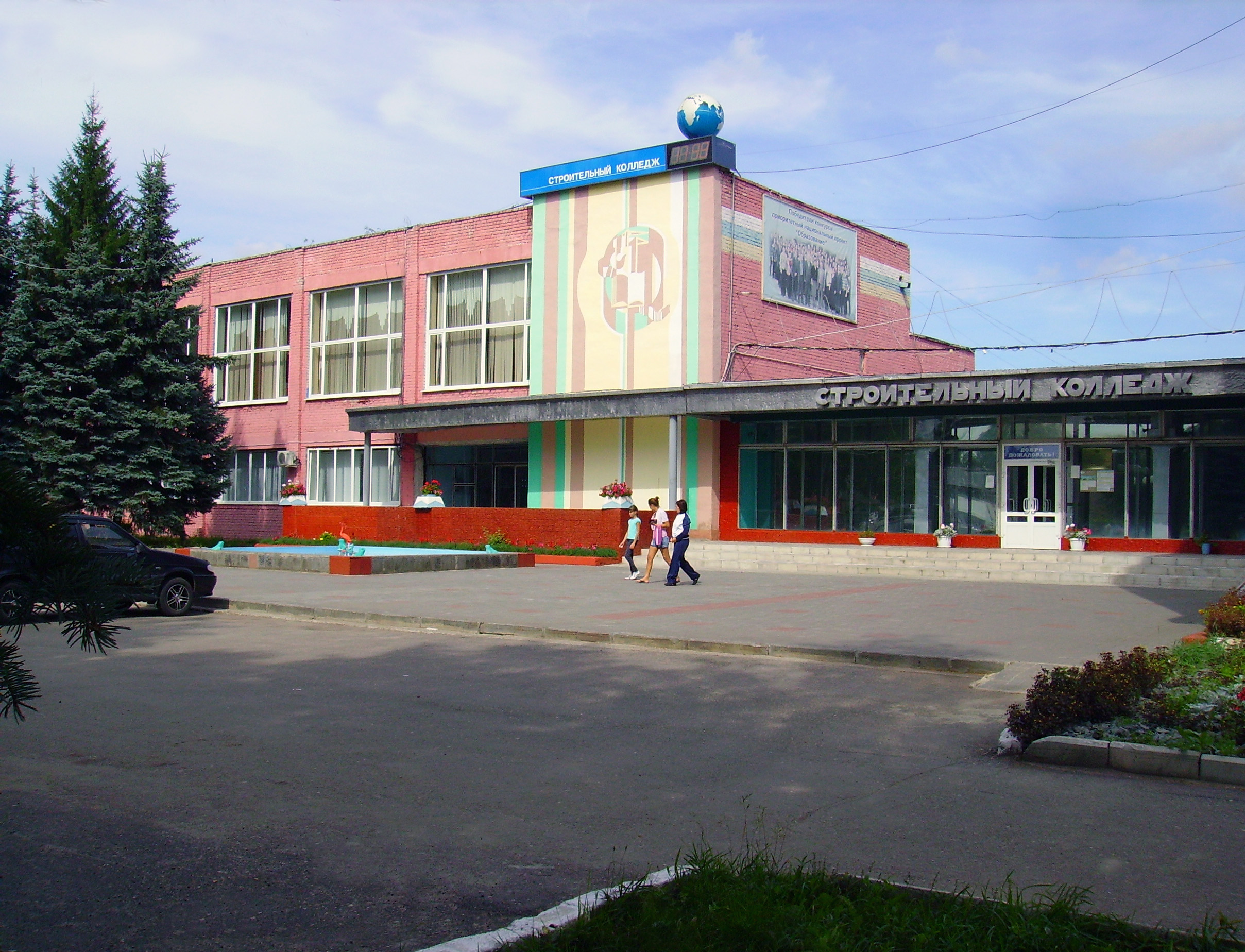
- Perevoz Civil Engineering College

- Flag Coat of arms
- Interactive map of Perevoz
- Location of Perevoz Perevoz (Nizhny Novgorod Oblast)
- Coordinates: 55°36′N 44°32′E
- Country: Russia
- Federal subject: Nizhny Novgorod Oblast
- Administrative district: Perevozsky District
- Town of district significanceSelsoviet: Perevoz
- Town status since: 2001

Population (2010 Census)
  - Total: 9,201
  - Estimate (2021): 8,999 (−2.2%)

Administrative status
  - Capital of: Perevozsky District, town of district significance of Perevoz

Municipal status
  - Municipal district: Perevozsky Municipal District
  - Urban settlement: Perevoz Urban Settlement
  - Capital of: Perevozsky Municipal District, Perevoz Urban Settlement
- Time zone: UTC+3 (MSK)
- Postal code: 607400
- OKTMO ID: 22644101001

Perevoz (Russian: Перево́з) is a town and the administrative center of Perevozsky District in Nizhny Novgorod Oblast, Russia, located on the Pyana River, 120 kilometers (75 mi) southeast of Nizhny Novgorod, the administrative center of the oblast. Population: 9,201 (2010 census); 9,386 (2002 census); 8,313 (1989 Soviet census).

== History ==
Town status was granted to Perevoz in 2001.

== Administrative and municipal status ==
Within the framework of administrative divisions, Perevoz serves as the administrative center of Perevozsky District. As an administrative division, it is, together with the village of Chergat, incorporated within Perevozsky District as the town of district significance of Perevoz. As a municipal division, the town of district significance of Perevoz is incorporated within Perevozsky Municipal District as Perevoz Urban Settlement.

== Notable people ==
- Gennady Yanayev (1937–2010), Soviet politician
