= Pyana =

River in Russia

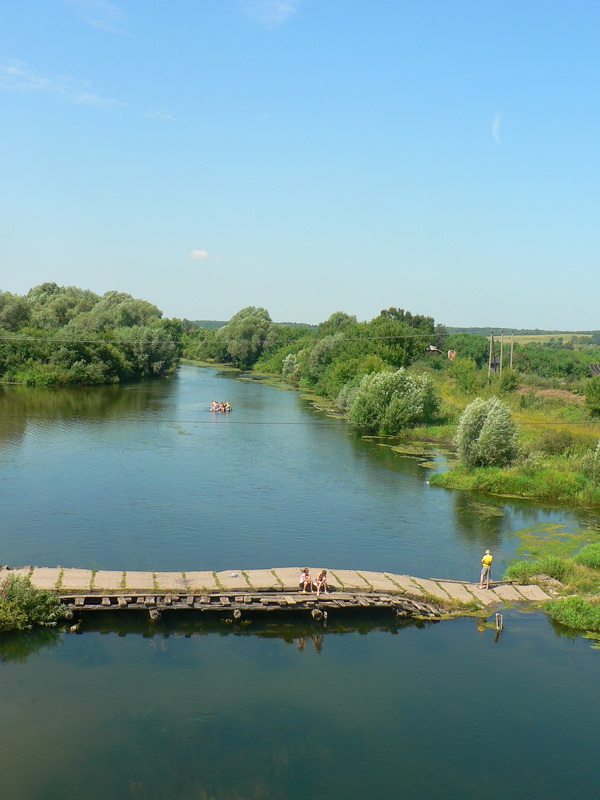

Location
- Country: Russia

Physical characteristics
- Source
  - location: Volga Upland
  - elevation: 220 m (720 ft)
- Mouth
  - location: Sura
  - coordinates: 55.6671°N 45.9163°E
  - elevation: 62 m (203 ft)
- Length: 436 km (271 mi)
- Basin size: 8,060 km^{2} (3,110 sq mi)
- Discharge
  - average: 25 m^{3}/s (880 cu ft/s)

Basin features
- Progression: Sura→ Volga→ Caspian Sea

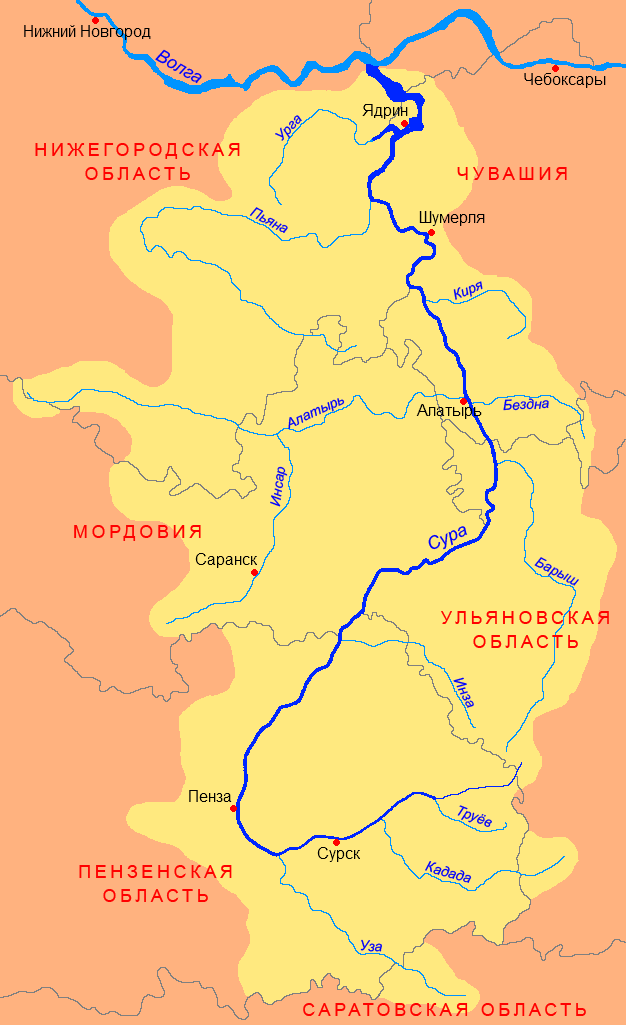

The Pyana (Russian: Пья́на) is a river in Nizhny Novgorod Oblast and the Republic of Mordovia, Russia. It is a left tributary of the Sura.

== History and etymology ==
Pyana translates from Russian into drunken. The original name of the river was likely Piana, and, like many other old Russian geographical names, might be of Uralic origin (compare Finnish pieni meaning small). The most likely reason for the transformation of Piana to Pyana was the Battle on Pyana River. The battle was fought on 2 August 1377 between the Blue Horde Khan Arapsha (Arab-Shah Muzaffar) and joint Russian troops under Knyaz Ivan Dmitriyevich. Awaiting the battle, the Russian Army lost discipline with drunkenness being a norm. They were unexpectedly attacked from all sides and crushed by the Mongols, forcing retreat to and across the Pyana. Many soldiers, and the Knyaz himself, drowned while crossing it. This explanation is further supported by the original text of the chronicles of the battle, where the writer first calls the river Piana, then notes the ironical similarity of the words piana and pyana (in a sense of drunkenness) and further uses Pyana as the river name.

== Geography and hydrology ==
The river is 436 kilometres (271 mi) long, and has a drainage basin of 8,060 square kilometres (3,110 sq mi). It freezes over in November and thaws in April. The average discharge 65 km from its mouth is 25 m³/s and can vary between 10 and 1,500 m³/s. The river's banks contain numerous karst caves. The Pyana is remarkable in its shape: it runs to the north-west and then turns 180° south-east, making a nearly closed loop (see map) before turning north and merging with the Sura.

== Human activities ==
The towns of Perevoz and Sergach are located on the Pyana. The river is navigable in its lower reaches. On the river banks there is Ichalkovsky Natural Reserve of 936 ha area which is protected by the state since 1963. There is a hydroelectric station near the village of Ichalkovo with the annual production of 600 MW. Its construction was started after World War II, but completed only in the 1990s.
