= Battle on Pyana River =

1377 battle between the Blue Horde and an alliance of Russian principalities

Battle on Pyana River (1377)
- Part of the Great Troubles
Date	August 2 [O.S. July 21] 1377
Location	Pyana River
Result	Golden Horde victory

Belligerents
Pereyaslavl; Yaroslavl; Yuryev; Nizhny Novgorod-Suzdal; Murom	Golden Horde

Commanders and leaders
Ivan Dmitriyevich †	Arab Shah; Albuga

The Battle on Pyana River (Russian: Сражение на реке Пьяне) took place on August 2, 1377, on the Pyana River between the Golden Horde under Arab Shah (Arapsha) and an alliance of Russian principalities led by Prince Ivan Dmitriyevich, made up of the Pereyaslavl, Yaroslavl, Yuryev, Nizhny Novgorod, and Murom principalities.

The Russian army, being drunken, was almost entirely routed by small forces of Arapsha, while Ivan Dmitriyevich had drowned together with druzhina and staff. The river's name Pyana, translated as "drunken" from Russian, is derived from those events. The corresponding events are further recorded in the medieval Russian Chronicle On The Slaughter at Pyana River.

== Background ==
In 1377 Moscow became aware of Arapsha and Knyaz Dmitry raising an army to recover his father-in-law Dmitri of Nizhny Novgorod. However nothing had happened and the troops returned to Moscow. Young knyaz Ivan Dmitriyevich, who assumed the joint command, moved the troops to River Pyana. The voyevodas learned that Arapsha was still far away, on the river Volchyi Vody, a tributary of Don. Because of hot weather, the awaiting Russian warriors began wandering around and consuming alcoholic beverages like mead and beer, which the troops of Suzdal prince drank while waiting in the local villages for the battle to begin.

== Battle ==
By the time the Russian troops were intoxicated, Arapsha, drawn by Mordva nobles, had sensibly arrived and divided his troops into five units. On August 2, he unexpectedly attacked the Russians from all sides. Unable to fight, the Russians retreated to Pyana. Ivan Dmitriyevich had drowned together with numerous servants and warriors while crossing the river. The rest were slain by Blue Horde soldiers. The aftermath was catastrophic. The Tatars under Arapsha were then able to reach Niznhy Novgorod, prompting the evacuation of residents by boats, while Dmitry of Suzdal evacuated to Suzdal. The town itself was sacked.

== Bibliography ==
=== References ===
- Pokhlebkin, William; Pokhlebkin, Vilʹi︠a︡m Vasilʹevich (1992). A history of vodka. Verso. ISBN 0-86091-359-7.
- Solovyov, Sergey (1851–1879). A History of Russia. Vol. 3 (1851–1879 ed.).
