= Orda (organization) =

Type of organization

An orda (also ordu, ordo, or ordon) or horde was a historical sociopolitical and military structure found on the Eurasian Steppe, usually associated with the Turkic and Mongol peoples. This form of entity can be seen as the regional equivalent of a clan or a tribe of nomads. Some successful ordas gave rise to khanates. The original term did not carry the meaning of a large khanate such as the Golden Horde. These structures were contemporarily referred to as ulus ("state" or "tribe").

== Etymology ==
Etymologically, the word ordu ultimately comes from the Turkic ordu which means "army" in Turkic and Mongolian languages, as well as "seat of power" or "royal court". In English, it was directly or indirectly borrowed from Latin orda, or from Polish horda.

Within the Liao Empire of the Khitans, the word ordo was used to refer to a nobleman's personal entourage or court, which included servants, retainers, and bodyguards. Emperors, empresses, and high ranking princes all had ordos of their own, which they were free to manage in practically any way they chose.

In modern times the term is also used to denote Kazakh tribal groupings, known as zhuz. The primary ones are the Younger Horde (junior zhuz) in western Kazakhstan, the Middle Horde (middle zhuz) in central Kazakhstan and the Older Horde (senior zhuz) in southeastern Kazakhstan.

'Urdu', the name of a language spoken in the Indian subcontinent, is also a cognate of this Turkic word.

In 16th-century Russian sources, the term Golden Horde is applied to the western khanate that succeeded the Mongol Empire; the term is now used retrospectively in modern scholarship. The term golden may have been used to refer to the riches of the khanate, or simply the yellow tents used by Mongol commanders. Previously, the Russians had used the term orda to denote the seat of the khan.

== Mongol Empire ==
Ordu or Ordo also means the Mongolian court. In Mongolian, the Government Palace is called "Zasgiin gazriin ordon".

Genghis Khan's encampment.

William of Rubruck described the Mongol mobile tent as follows:

The dwelling in which they sleep is based on a hoop of interlaced branches, and its supports are made of branches, converging at the top around a small hoop, from which projects a neck like a chimney. They cover it with white felt: quite often they also smear the felt with chalk or white clay and ground bones to make it gleam whiter, or sometimes they blacken it. And they decorate the felt around the neck at the top with various fine designs. Similarly they hang up in front of the entrance felt patchwork in various patterns: they sew onto one piece others of different colours to make vines, trees, birds and animals. These dwellings are constructed of such a size as to be on occasions thirty feet (9 metres) across: I myself once measured a breadth of twenty feet (6 metres) between the wheel tracks of a wagon, and when the dwelling was on the wagon it protruded beyond the wheels by at least five feet on either side. I have counted twenty-two oxen to one wagon, hauling along a dwelling, eleven in a row, corresponding to the width of the wagon, and another eleven in front of them. The wagon's axle was as large as a ship's mast, and one man stood at the entrance to the dwelling on top of the wagon, driving the oxen.

— William of Rubruck, c. 1220 – c. 1293

Ibn Battuta writes:

...we saw a vast city on the move with its inhabitants, with mosques and bazaars in it, the smoke of the kitchens rising in the air (for they cook while on the march), and horse drawn wagons transporting the people. On reaching the camping place they took down the tents from the wagons and set them on the ground, for they are light to carry, and so likewise they did with the mosque and shops.

— Ibn Battuta, 1331–1332

The Century Dictionary and Cyclopedia (1911) defined orda as "a tribe or troop of Asiatic nomads dwelling in tents or wagons, and migrating from place to place to procure pasturage for their cattle, or for war or plunder."

Merriam–Webster defined horde in this context as "a political subdivision of central Asian people" or "a people or tribe of nomadic life".

Ordas would form when families settled in auls would find it impossible to survive in that area and were forced to move. Often, periods of drought would coincide with the rise in the number of ordas. Ordas were patriarchal, with its male members constituting a military. While some ordas were able to sustain themselves from their herds; others turned to pillaging their neighbors. In subsequent fighting, some ordas were destroyed, others assimilated. The most successful ones would, for a time, assimilate most or all other ordas of the Eurasian Steppe and turn to raiding neighboring political entities; those ordas often left their mark on history, the most famous of which is the Golden Horde of the later Mongol Empire.

Famous ordas (hordes) include:

- the White Horde, formed 1226
- the Blue Horde, formed 1227
- the Golden Horde, a Tatar-Mongol state established in the 1240s
- the Great Horde, remnant of the Golden Horde from about 1466 until 1502
- the Nogai Horde, a Tatar clan situated in the Caucasus Mountain region, formed in the 1390s

In the modern Mongolian language, the form of the word, Ordon is more commonly used throughout Mongolia and Inner Mongolia.

== See also ==
- Nomadic pastoralism
- Cossack host
- Urdu
