= Shiban =

- Khan of the Ulus of Jochi
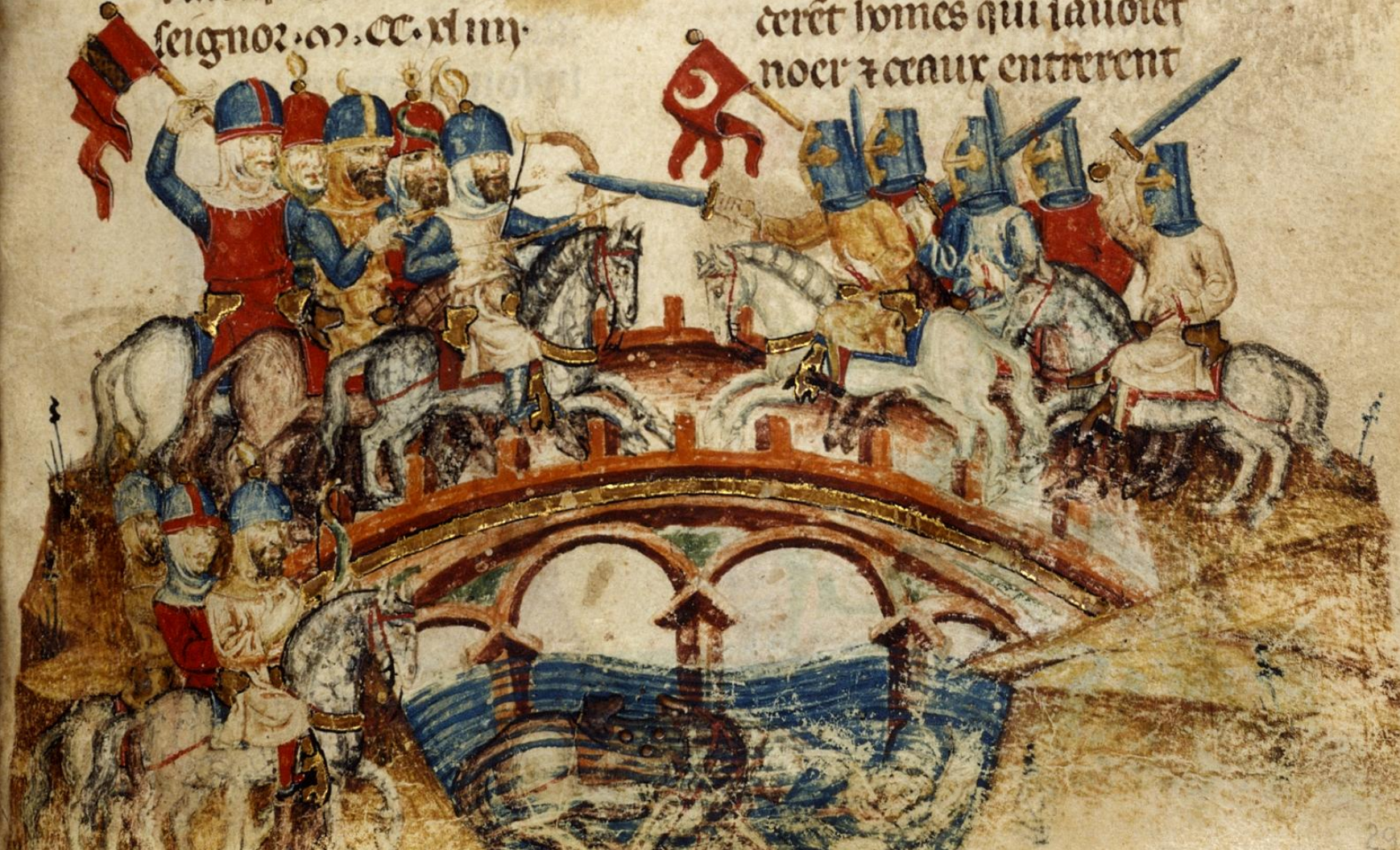
- Depiction of the Battle of Mohi between the Mongols, including Shiban, and Hungary. 13th-century illumination
- Predecessor: Batu Khan
- Died: 1248; Eurasia
- Issue: Bahadur; Salghan; Qadaq
- House: Borjigin
- Dynasty: Mongol Empire
- Father: Jochi Khan

Shiban (/ˈʃɪbən/; Mongolian: Шибан [ˈɕib̥əɴ]), Siban (Kazakh: Сибан) or Shayban (/ʃaɪˈbɑːn/; Classical Persian: شیبان, romanized: Shaybān, [ʃæjˈbɒːn]) was a prince of the early Golden Horde, a division of the Mongol Empire. He was a grandson of Genghis Khan, the fifth son of Jochi and a younger brother of Batu Khan who founded the Golden Horde. His descendants were the Shaybanids who became important about two centuries later.

== Mongol invasion of Europe ==
Shiban participated the Mongol invasion of Europe and made a decisive attack on the army of Béla IV at the Battle of Mohi in 1241.

== Territorial grants by the Golden Horde ==
Because he had not reached his majority when his father died in 1227, he did not receive any lands at that time. Abulghazi says that after this campaign, Batu gave Shiban lands east of the Ural Mountains on the lower parts of the Syr Darya, Chu River, and Sary su Rivers as winter quarters and the lands of the Ural River flowing off the east side of the Urals, as summer quarters. Shiban was also given 15,000 families as a gift from his brother Orda Khan, as well as the four Uruks of the Kuchis, the Naimans, the Karluks, and the Buiruks, while he assigned him as a camping ground all the country lying between that of his brother Orda Ichin and his own. Thus Shiban's lands were somewhat between Batu's and Orda's and between the Ural mountains and the Caspian Sea.

== Descendants ==
Although it is unknown how long he lived, his descendants continued to rule long after the breakup of the Ulus of Jochi (Golden Horde). It is merely said that he left twelve sons, namely Bainal or Yasal, Behadur, Kadak, Balagha, Cherik or Jerik, Mergen or Surkhan, Kurtugha or Kultuka, Ayachi or Abaji, Sailghan or Sasiltan, Beyanjar or Bayakachar, Majar, and Kunchi or Kuwinji. Shiban's descendants are known as the Shaybanids; his male line continues down to the present time.

One of Shiban's sons, Balagha Bey (Prince Balagha) assisted Hulagu Khan in taking Baghdad in 1258. However, he died in unknown circumstances. According to William of Rubruck, he killed his cousin Güyük Khan in a violent brawl.

A number of Shiban's descendants ascended the throne of the Golden Horde after the extinction of the line of Batu in 1359, including the thrones of the Golden Horde's successor states, like the Khanate of Sibir and the Uzbek Khanate. Two sets of Shiban's descendants established themselves in Central Asia, founding the Khanates of Transoxiana (later Bukhara) and Khwarazm (later Khiva).

== See also ==
- Khanate of Sibir
- Muhammad Shaybani
- Shaybanids

== Sources ==
- Bosworth, C. E., The New Islamic Dynasties, New York, 1996.
- Bregel, Y. (transl.), Firdaws al-Iqbāl: History of Khorezm by Shir Muhammad Mirab Munis and Muhammad Riza Mirab Agahi, Leiden, 1999.
- Desmaisons, P. I. (transl.), Histoire des Mongols et des Tatares par Aboul-Ghâzi Béhâdour Khân, St Petersburg, 1871-1874.
- Gaev, A. G., "Genealogija i hronologija Džučidov," Numizmatičeskij sbornik 3 (2002) 9-55.
- Grousset, R. The Empire of the Steppes, New Brunswick, New Jersey: Rutgers University Press, 1970 (translated by Naomi Walford from the French edition published by Payot, 1970), pp. 478–490 et passim.
- Howorth, H. H., History of the Mongols from the 9th to the 19th Century. Part II.1, II.2. London, 1880.
- Judin, V. P., Utemiš-hadži, Čingiz-name, Alma-Ata, 1992.
- Sabitov, Ž. M., Genealogija "Tore", Astana, 2008.
- Sagdeeva, R. Z., Serebrjannye monety hanov Zolotoj Ordy, Moscow, 2005.
- Tizengauzen, V. G. (trans.), Sbornik materialov, otnosjaščihsja k istorii Zolotoj Ordy. Izvlečenija iz arabskih sočinenii, republished as Istorija Kazahstana v arabskih istočnikah. 1. Almaty, 2005.
- Tizengauzen, V. G. (trans.), Sbornik materialov otnosjaščihsja k istorii Zolotoj Ordy. Izvlečenija iz persidskih sočinenii, republished as Istorija Kazahstana v persidskih istočnikah. 4. Almaty, 2006.
- Vohidov, Š. H. (trans.), Istorija Kazahstana v persidskih istočnikah. 3. Muʿizz al-ansāb. Almaty, 2006.
