= Velyaminov =

Velyaminov (Russian: Вельяминов), or Velyaminova (Вельяминова; feminine), is a Russian last name and may refer to:

== People ==
- Velyaminov (family), a family of Muscovite boyars, see candidate branch Vorontsov
- Alexei Velyaminov (1785–1838), Russian general and brother of Ivan Velyaminov; see Ernst von Stackelberg
- Ivan Velyaminov (1771–1837), a Russian commander in the Patriotic War of 1812
- Ivan Velyaminov, birth name of Josyf Veliamyn Rutsky (1574-1637), bishop of Kiev–Galicia
- Nikolai Velyaminov (1855–1920), Russian surgeon and public figure
- Pyotr Velyaminov (1926–2009), Soviet/Russian actor and People's Artist of the RSFSR
- Stepan Velyaminov (1670–1737), Russian general
- Vasily Velyaminov (?-1373), father-in-law of Ivan II of Moscow
- Pyotr Velyaminov-Zernov (18th century), Russian governor-general of Moscow, 1726-1738
- Alexandra Velyaminova (died 1364), Grand Princess consort of Muscovy (married to Ivan II of Moscow)
- Boris Vorontsov-Velyaminov (1904–1994), Russian astronomer

== Places ==
- Velyaminovo railway station, a stop on the Paveletsky suburban railway line
