= Tsarevich (disambiguation) =

Tsarevich is a Slavic title given to tsars' sons.

Tsarevich may also refer to:

- Ivan Tsarevich, a hero of Russian folklore
- Tsarevich (Fabergé egg), a 1912 Fabergé egg
- The Tsarevich (1929 film), a 1929 German silent historical film
- The Tsarevich (1933 film), a 1933 German historical musical film
- Russian battleship Tsarevich

== See also ==
- Tsarevich Ivan (disambiguation)
- Tsesarevich
