= Iconostasis of the Cathedral of the Archangel =

Traditional Russian wall of icons

The Iconostasis of Cathedral of the Archangel Michael is a traditional Russian iconostasis, which dates from 1678 to 1681. The iconostasis, which has been preserved to our day, is located in The Cathedral of the Archangel in the Kremlin of Moscow

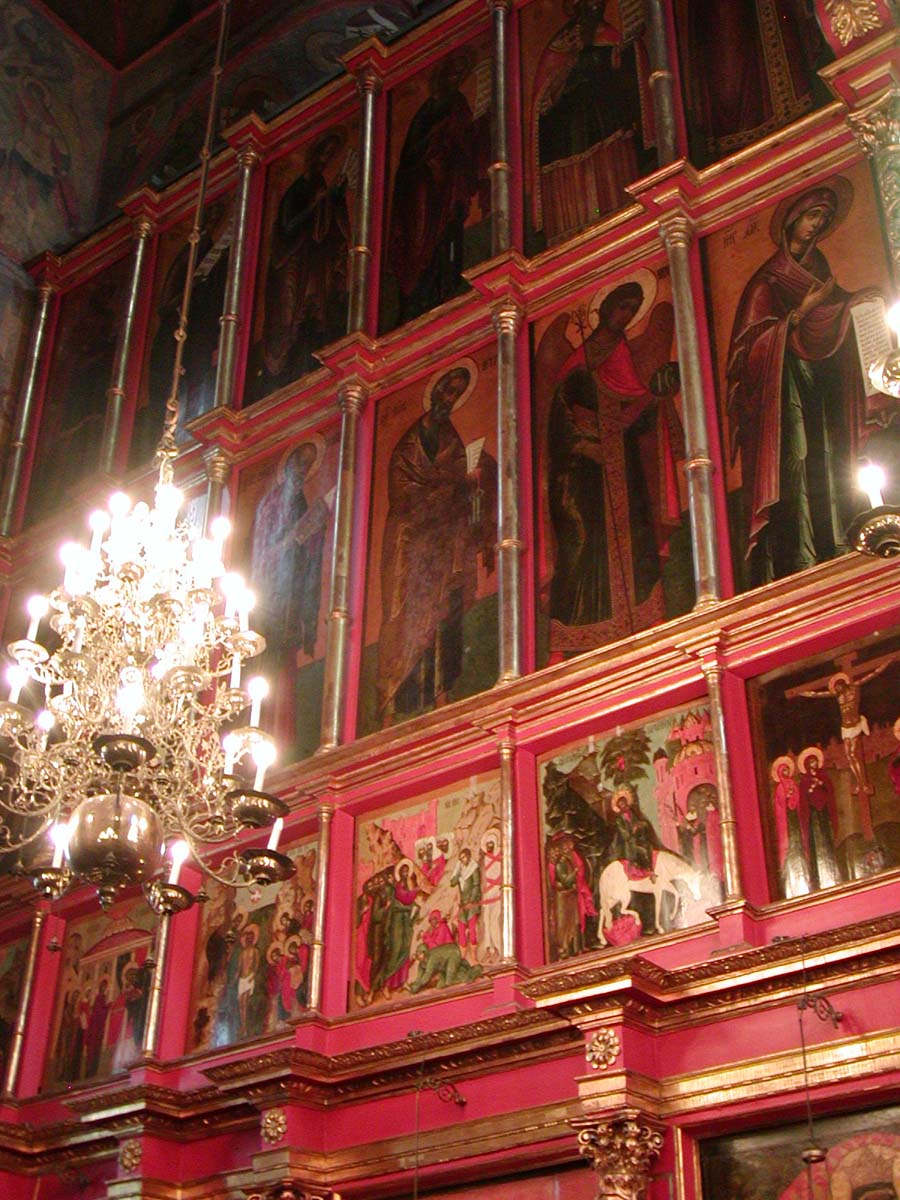
The interior is entirely covered with holy icons.

== History ==
The large iconostasis, 13 meters high, dates from 1678-81. Ninety-two painters selected by Simon Ushakov, the famous icon painter of the 17th century, took part in painting the murals of Archangel Cathedral. The paintings in the Archangel Cathedral are monumental showing the obvious tendency of the masters to spaciousness and simultaneously to simple and clear composition unburdened by subject-matter detail. The faces are painted in the soft painting technique typical of 17th century icon painting. The color scheme is simple, including gold, yellow, green, light-blue, blue, pink, and red.

== Details ==
The iconostasis of the Archangel's Cathedral consists of four tiers – local, festive, deisis and prophets. All the icons of the iconostasis, except two icons of the local row – "The Annunciation of Ustyug" and "Archangel Michael in deeds" – were created by royal painters ("isografs") in 1679-1681. All the other icons, following the medieval Christian tradition were left unsigned. The wooden frame of the iconostasis was created in the reign of Theodore Alexeevich by a team of carvers. It is crafted in the Baroque style.

=== Prophets ===
All the prophets are depicted standing and holding open scrolls with prophetic scripture. The central image of the row is the monumental icon of "Our Lady" sitting on a throne with the Child on her lap.

=== Deises ===
The deisis row includes both the traditional, five-figured key (Saviour Almighty, Our Lady, John the Precursor, Archangel Michael, Archangel Gabriel) and icons of the twelve Apostles (six from each side).

=== Local ===
There are two images on the Local tier, on either side of King's Gatee: "Our Lady the Favoured Heaven" and "saviour the Great Pontiff".

=== Festive ===
The festive row depicts the events from New Testament that are celebrated in the church. they include Christmas, Candelas Day, Epiphany, the Resurrection of Lazarus, Enter into Jerusalem, and the Crucifixion

=== "Archangel Michael" ===
The icon that the church draws its name from, "Archangel Michael" is the most ancient one. It was painted c. 1399 and adorned the iconostasis of the preceding Archangel’s Church. The icon, the oldest in the iconostasis, is believed to have been created for Princess Eudoxia, the wife of Dmitri Donskoi to the memory the victory in the Battle of Kulikovo.
