= Tsarevich Ivan =

Tsarevich Ivan may refer to:

- Ivan I of Moscow, son of Daniel of Moscow and his wife Maria
- Tsarevich Ivan Simeonovich, son of Simeon of Moscow and Maria of Tver
- Ivan II of Moscow, son of Ivan I of Moscow and his wife Helena
- Tsarevich Ivan Ivanovich, Prince of Zvenigorod (1356 – October 1364), son of Ivan II of Moscow and Alexandra Vasilyevna Velyaminova
- Tsarevich Ivan Dmitriyevich (died 1393), son of Dmitry Donskoy and Eudoxia of Moscow
- Tsarevich Ivan Vasilievich (1396–1417), son of Vasily I of Moscow and Sophia of Lithuania
- Ivan III of Russia, son of Vasily II of Moscow and Maria of Borovsk
- Ivan the Young (1458–1490), son of Ivan III of Russia and Maria of Tver
- Ivan the Terrible, son of Vasili III of Russia and Elena Glinskaya
- Tsarevich Ivan Ivanovich of Russia, son of Ivan IV of Russia and Anastasia Romanovna
- Tsarevich Ivan Dmitriyevich, son of False Dmitry of Russia and Marina Mniszech
- Tsarevich Ivan Mikhailovich, son of Michael of Russia and Eudoxia Streshneva
- Ivan V of Russia, son of Alexis of Russia and Maria Miloslavskaya
- Ivan Tsarevich, supposed youngest son of Tsar Vislav and Vasilisa Prekrasna
