= Ivan of Moscow =

May refer to the following grand princes of Moscow:

- Ivan I of Moscow (1288–1340 or 1341)
- Ivan II of Moscow (1326–1359)
- Ivan III of Moscow (1440–1505)
- Ivan IV of Moscow (also known as Ivan the Terrible), first tsar of Russia (1530–1584)
