= Tulak (Golden Horde) =

Khan of the Golden Horde from 1379 to 1380

Tūlāk

Khan of the Golden Horde Western Half (Blue Horde)
- Reign: 1379–1380
- Predecessor: Muḥammad-Sulṭān
- Successor: Tokhtamysh
- Died: 1380
- Dynasty: Borjigin
- Father: Tughluq Khwaja?
- Religion: Islam

Tūlāk (Turki/Kypchak: تولاک; Persian: توکل; Teljak, Tjuljak, Tetjak in Russian texts; died 1380) was Khan of part of the Golden Horde from 1379 to 1380. He was a protégé of Mamai, a beglerbeg. While Tūlāk was recognized as khan throughout the territories dominated by his patron Mamai, he was not in possession of the traditional capital Sarai.

== Origins ==
Based on the early readings of coin labels, Tūlāk was long identified with Muḥammad-Sulṭān as a single individual, the supposed Khan Muḥammad-Būlāq ("Muhammad-Bolaq," "Muhammed-Buljak"). This identification has had a long influence on subsequent historiography, but has been disproved by recent scholarship, which established that Tūlāk is to be distinguished from his predecessor as Mamai's protégé, Muḥammad-Sulṭān (Mamat-Sultan in Russian sources). The form Būlāq is to be seen as a variant reading of Tūlāk, and to be associated with the khan reigning in 1379–1380, not the khan (Muḥammad-Sulṭān) reigning in 1370–1379.

The source evidence on Tūlāk is extremely limited, and his ancestry is nowhere stated specifically. On the supposition that he was related to his predecessors as Mamai's protégés, and that these came from among the Crimean descendants of Tuqa-Timur (Togai-Timur), son of Jochi, it has been suggested that Tūlāk should be identified with a certain Tawakkul, son of Tughluq Khwāja, son of Mīnkāsar, son of Abāy, son of Kay-Tīmūr, son of Tūqā-Tīmūr, son of Jochi, listed in the detailed genealogical compendium Muʿizz al-ansāb. If this identification is correct, it would make Tūlāk the nephew of ʿAbdallāh Khan and the first cousin of Muḥammad-Sulṭān.

== Partnership with Mamai ==
The reverses suffered by Mamai at the hands of the Russians and of his rivals for possession of Sarai in the late 1370s may have strained his relationship with his protégé, Muḥammad-Sulṭān, who had reached the age of maturity. According to a Russian chronicle, Mamai had his khan murdered, fearing his popularity among his subjects. Although the Russian chronicle gives the impression that Mamai did so to rule on his own, this was not the case. He installed a new khan as his protégé, Tūlāk, the dead khan's cousin, if his ancestry has been identified correctly. This happened before 28 February 1379, when a diploma (yarlik) was issued for the would-be Russian Metropolitan Mihail (Mitjaj) in the name of Tūlāk Khan. This action of Mamai and his new khan has been interpreted as a last-ditch effort to conciliate the increasingly independent Grand Prince Dmitrij Ivanovič of Moscow. If so, the gesture failed, and Mamai and Tūlāk soon adopted a more aggressive stance, attempting to undermine Dmitrij of Moscow from within, and also issuing an ultimatum demanding the payment of renewed and increased tribute. Both sides prepared for the looming conflict, but the Russians stole a march on their foes and attacked them at the Battle of Kulikovo on 8 September 1380. Tūlāk's presence on the battlefield is confirmed by the Russian sources, although his fate is not. He disappears from the sources after finding himself under attack by Dmitrij of Moscow, and it is assumed that he perished in the battle. Mamai's loss of his khan was possibly a contributing factor to his abandonment by many of his emirs, ensuring the triumph of the new khan Tokhtamysh in 1380–1381. Despite his short reign, coins were issued in Tūlāk's name at an unspecified mint and possibly at (old) Astrakhan.

== Genealogy ==
- Genghis Khan
- Jochi
- Tuqa-Timur
- Kay-Timur
- Abay
- Minkasar
- Tughluq Khwaja
- Tūlāk

(as identified by Gaev 2002)

== See also ==
- List of khans of the Golden Horde

== Sources ==
- Bosworth, C. E., The New Islamic Dynasties, New York, 1996.
- Fren (Frähn), H. M., Monety Hanov Ulusa Džučieva ili Zolotoj Ordy, St Petersburg, 1832.
- Gaev, A. G., "Genealogija i hronologija Džučidov," Numizmatičeskij sbornik 3 (2002) 9-55.
- Grekov, B. D., and A. J. Jakubovskij, Zolotaja orda i eë padenie. Moscow, 1950.
- Grigor'ev, A. P., "Zolotoordynskie hany 60-70-h godov XIV v.: hronologija pravlenii," Istriografija i istočnikovedenie stran Azii i Afriki 7 (1983) 9-54.
- Howorth, H. H., History of the Mongols from the 9th to the 19th Century. Part II.1. London, 1880.
- Dmitriev, L. A., and O. P. Lihačëv, Skazanija i povesti o Kulikovskoj bitve, St Petersburg, 1982.
- May, T., The Mongol Empire. Edinburgh, 2018.
- Mirgaleev, I. M., Političeskaja istorija Zolotoj Ordy perioda pravlenija Toktamyš-hana, Kazan', 2003.
- Nasonov, A. N., Mongoly i Rus', Moscow, 1940.
- Počekaev, R. J., Cari ordynskie: Biografii hanov i pravitelej Zolotoj Ordy. Saint Petersburg, 2010.
- Polnoe sobranie russkih letopisej 11, St Petersburg, 1897.
- Sabitov, Ž. M., Genealogija "Tore", Astana, 2008.
- Safargaliev, M. G., Raspad Zolotoj Ordy. Saransk, 1960.
- Sagdeeva, R. Z., Serebrjannye monety hanov Zolotoj Ordy, Moscow, 2005.
- Savel'ev, P., Monety džučidov, džagataidov, dželairidov, St Petersburg, 1857.
- Sidorenko, V. A., "Hronologija pravlenii zolotoordynskih hanov 1357-1380 gg.," Materialov po arheologii, istorii i ètnografii Tavrii 7 (2000) 267–288.
- Thackston, W. M. (trans.), Khwandamir, Habibu's-siyar. Tome Three. Cambridge, MA, 1994.
- Tizengauzen, V. G. (trans.), Sbornik materialov, otnosjaščihsja k istorii Zolotoj Ordy. Izvlečenija iz arabskih sočinenii, republished as Istorija Kazahstana v arabskih istočnikah. 1. Almaty, 2005.
- Tizengauzen, V. G. (trans.), Sbornik materialov otnosjaščihsja k istorii Zolotoj Ordy. Izvlečenija iz persidskih sočinenii, republished as Istorija Kazahstana v persidskih istočnikah. 4. Almaty, 2006.
- Vernadsky, G., The Mongols and Russia, New Haven, 1953.
- Vohidov, Š. H. (trans.), Istorija Kazahstana v persidskih istočnikah. 3. Muʿizz al-ansāb. Almaty, 2006.

Preceded by Muḥammad-Sulṭān	Khan of the Golden Horde; 1379–1380	Succeeded by Tokhtamysh
