= Serkiz =

14th-century Tatar prince

Serkiz (Russian: Серкиз) was a Tatar prince. Born in the mid-14th century, in the Golden Horde, he became an Orthodox Christian and was baptised under the name Ivan Serkizov. He died in the late 14th century in Muscovy.

== Biography ==
There is no contemporary record of Serkiz's existence. Later records state that he led an army in the service of the Grand Prince Dmitry Donskoy. He had at least one child, Andrey Ivanovich Serkizov (died 1380).

== Legacy ==
Four villages in the Moscow region were named Cherkizovo or Serkizovo in his honour by Dmitry Donskoy. Serkiz is the ancestor of the Starkov family.
