= Abdallāh (Golden Horde) =

Khan of the Golden Horde in 1361

ʿAbdallāh
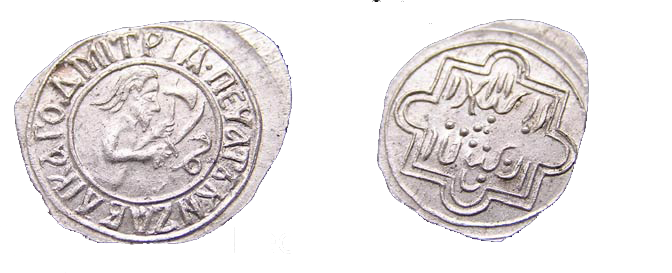
- coin, Moscovite Tartary (Muscovy), on the reverse - Khan's name Abdullah (in Arabic), stamping Dmitry Donskoy

Khan of the Golden Horde Western Half (Blue Horde)
- Reign: 1361–1370
- Predecessor: Kildi Beg
- Successor: Tulun Beg Khanum and Muḥammad-Sulṭān
- Died: June? 1370
- Issue: Muḥammad-Sulṭān
- Dynasty: Borjigin
- Father: Minkasar?
- Religion: Islam

ʿAbdallāh (Turki/Kypchak and Persian: عبدالله; also Avdulja, modern Abdulla and Avdulla in Russian texts; died 1370) was Khan of the Golden Horde in 1361–1370, as a protégé of the beglerbeg Mamai. While ʿAbdallāh was recognized as khan throughout the territories dominated by his patron Mamai, he was in possession of the traditional capital Sarai only intermittently, in 1362, 1367–1368, and 1369–1370.

== Origins ==
The origins and identity of Khan ʿAbdallāh are unclear, and nowhere stated precisely. On the basis of Mamai's marriage to the daughter (Tulun Beg Khanum?) of Khan Berdi Beg, a descendant of Jochi's son Batu, and also Ibn Khaldun's statement that "Mamai went to the Crimea and appointed as khan one of the offspring of the children of Öz Beg, named ʿAbdallāh," some modern historians have considered ʿAbdallāh a descendant of Batu and, more specifically, of Öz Beg. This is possibly undermined by negative evidence: Ibn Khaldun is not infallible in his coverage of the Golden Horde (considering, for example, Tokhtamysh the son of Berdi Beg); the Čingīz-Nāmah asserted that the death of Berdi Beg was said to have ended the line of Batu; Mamai is unlikely to have supported a pretended descendant of Öz Beg in Kildi Beg, if a genuine one was available in ʿAbdallāh; the detailed genealogical compendiums do not include any descendant of Batu identifiable with ʿAbdallāh. A plausible alternative is to identify ʿAbdallāh with a certain ʿAbdal (son of Mīnkāsar, son of Abāy, son of Kay-Tīmūr, son of Tūqā-Tīmūr, son of Jochi), listed by the Muʿizz al-ansāb and Tawārīḫ-i guzīdah-i nuṣrat-nāmah among the descendants of Jochi's son Tuqa-Timur, alongside others that can be identified with Mamai's subsequent puppet khans Muḥammad-Sulṭān and Tūlāk; moreover, descendants of Tuqa-Timur are known to have settled in the Crimea, which was Mamai's power base.

== Partnership with Mamai ==
The former beglerbeg Mamai was apparently excluded from power at Sarai following the death of his father-in-law, Khan Berdi Beg in 1359. He returned to his power base in and near the Crimea, where he seems to have been autonomous, his relations with the rapidly changing khans in capital being unknown. In 1361, Mamai briefly cooperated with a fellow emir of Berdi Beg, Yaglï Bay, in promoting the pretended Kildi Beg against the rival khans Timur Khwaja and Ordu Malik. After Kildi Beg was installed at Sarai, however, Mamai returned to the Crimea and declared a khan of his own, ʿAbdallāh, still in 1361. As a descendant of Genghis Khan's son Jochi, ʿAbdallāh provided a legitimate, if nominal, monarch, in whose name Mamai could act and legitimize his actions. If, as suggested above, ʿAbdallāh was a descendant of Jochi's son Togai-Timur, he would have belonged to a line of the royal clan already established in Mamai's power base in the Crimea, which may have been convenient and helpful for Mamai. The limited information of the sources shows ʿAbdallāh as entirely cooperative with, and perhaps subservient to Mamai; on the occasions when he was not alongside Mamai, he was quickly driven off by rivals.

When Kildi Beg was defeated and killed by Murād in September 1362, Mamai succeeded in taking over the capital Sarai, and installing his khan, ʿAbdallāh, there. However, Mamai was apparently immediately needed elsewhere due to a Lithuanian invasion, leaving ʿAbdallāh at Sarai. The rival khan Murād lost no time in expelling ʿAbdallāh and seizing the city for himself. Even reduced to the territory under Mamai's effective control, ʿAbdallāh continued to be considered khan, and it was in his name that Mamai negotiated with the Russian princes, including Dmitrij Donskoj of Moscow, and with other foreigners. In 1367, Mamai took advantage of (and possibly engineered) the murder of Khan ʿAzīz Shaykh to recover Sarai and reinstall ʿAbdallāh there. This was followed by a repeat of the previous experience, with Mamai called away to the Crimea in 1368, and ʿAbdallāh quickly expelled from Sarai by Mamai's rival Ḥājjī Cherkes of Astrakhan, who installed a puppet khan of his own in the city. Continued rivalries over Sarai allowed Mamai and ʿAbdallāh to recover the city faster than before, in 1369. Shortly afterwards, by June 1370, ʿAbdallāh died. A Russian chronicle relates that Mamai murdered his own khan, fearing the people's attachment to him; this is often considered a reference to the end of ʿAbdallāh, but whether he is meant here and whether the allegation is true, remains unclear. Coins were minted in the name of ʿAbdallāh at Orda (apparently a city rather than, as sometimes supposed, Mamai's mobile headquarters), Azaq, Yangishehr (perhaps Old Orhei in Bassarabia), and Sarai, depending on when Mamai's control extended to these mints. Following ʿAbdallāh's death, Mamai appointed Tulun Beg Khanum, apparently his wife, the daughter of Berdi Beg, as stopgap monarch at Sarai (1370-1371), before installing there his next choice as khan, Muḥammad-Sulṭān, apparently ʿAbdallāh's son.

== Genealogy ==
- Genghis Khan
- Jochi
- Tuqa-Timur
- Kay-Timur
- Abay
- Minkasar
- ʿAbdallāh

(as identified by Gaev 2002)

== See also ==
- List of khans of the Golden Horde

== Sources ==
- Gaev, A. G., "Genealogija i hronologija Džučidov," Numizmatičeskij sbornik 3 (2002) 9-55.
- Grekov, B. D., and A. J. Jakubovskij, Zolotaja orda i eë padenie. Moscow, 1950.
- Grigor'ev, A. P., "Zolotoordynskie hany 60-70-h godov XIV v.: hronologija pravlenii," Istriografija i istočnikovedenie stran Azii i Afriki 7 (1983) 9-54.
- Howorth, H. H., History of the Mongols from the 9th to the 19th Century. Part II.1. London, 1880.
- Judin, V. P., Utemiš-hadži, Čingiz-name, Alma-Ata, 1992.
- May, T., The Mongol Empire. Edinburgh, 2018.
- Mirgaleev, I. M., Političeskaja istorija Zolotoj Ordy perioda pravlenija Toktamyš-hana, Kazan', 2003.
- Nasonov, A. N., Mongoly i Rus', Moscow, 1940.
- Počekaev, R. J., Cari ordynskie: Biografii hanov i pravitelej Zolotoj Ordy. Saint Petersburg, 2010.
- Sabitov, Ž. M., Genealogija "Tore", Astana, 2008.
- Safargaliev, M. G., Raspad Zolotoj Ordy. Saransk, 1960.
- Sidorenko, V. A., "Hronologija pravlenii zolotoordynskih hanov 1357-1380 gg.," Materialov po arheologii, istorii i ètnografii Tavrii 7 (2000) 267-288.
- Thackston, W. M. (trans.), Khwandamir, Habibu's-siyar. Tome Three. Cambridge, MA, 1994.
- Tizengauzen, V. G. (trans.), Sbornik materialov, otnosjaščihsja k istorii Zolotoj Ordy. Izvlečenija iz arabskih sočinenii, republished as Istorija Kazahstana v arabskih istočnikah. 1. Almaty, 2005.
- Tizengauzen, V. G. (trans.), Sbornik materialov otnosjaščihsja k istorii Zolotoj Ordy. Izvlečenija iz persidskih sočinenii, republished as Istorija Kazahstana v persidskih istočnikah. 4. Almaty, 2006.
- Vernadsky, G., The Mongols and Russia, New Haven, 1953.
- Vohidov, Š. H. (trans.), Istorija Kazahstana v persidskih istočnikah. 3. Muʿizz al-ansāb. Almaty, 2006.

Preceded by Kildi Beg	Khan of the Golden Horde; 1361–1370	Succeeded by Tulun Beg Khanum and Muḥammad-Sulṭān
