= Muhammad Sultan (Golden Horde) =

Khan of the Golden Horde from 1370/1371 to 1379

Muḥammad-Sulṭān

Khan of the Golden Horde Western Half (Blue Horde)
- Reign: 1370/1371–1379
- Predecessor: ʿAbdallāh and Tulun Beg Khanum
- Successor: Tūlāk
- Died: 1379
- Dynasty: Borjigin
- Father: ʿAbdallāh?
- Religion: Islam

Ghiyās̱ al-Dīn Muḥammad (Persian: غیاث الدین محمد), also known as Muḥammad Khān (Turki/Kypchak: محمد خان; Mamat-Sultan in Russian texts; died 1379), was Khan of the Golden Horde from 1370/1371 to 1379. He was a protégé of Mamai, a beglerbeg. While Muḥammad-Sulṭān was recognized as the khan throughout the territories dominated by his patron Mamai, he was in possession of the traditional capital Sarai only intermittently, in 1371–1373, 1374, and perhaps briefly in 1375–1376.

== Origins ==
Based on the early readings of coin labels, Khan Muḥammad-Sulṭān was long identified as a supposed Khan Muḥammad-Būlāq ("Muhammad-Bolaq," "Muhammed-Buljak"). This identification has had a long influence on subsequent historiography, but has been disproved by recent scholarship, which established that Muḥammad-Sulṭān is to be distinguished from his successor as Mamai's protégé, Tūlāk (Teljak, Tjuljak, Tetjak in Russian sources).

The ancestry of Khan Muḥammad-Sulṭān is nowhere precisely stated, and some scholars have supposed that he was a member of the line of Jochi's son Batu Khan, indeed a descendant of Öz Beg Khan. But the line of Batu is said to have ended in 1359 with the death of Berdi Beg, who had eliminated his close male kindred as potential rivals. A plausible alternative is to identify Muḥammad-Sulṭān with Muḥammad, son of ʿAbdal (i.e., ʿAbdallāh), son of Mīnkāsar, son of Abāy, son of Kay-Tīmūr, son of Tūqā-Tīmūr, son of Jochi, listed by the Muʿizz al-ansāb and Tawārīḫ-i guzīdah-i nuṣrat-nāmah. This would make Muḥammad-Sulṭān the son of his predecessor ʿAbdallāh, also a protégé of Mamai, and one of the descendants of Tuqa-Timur, who are known to have settled in the Crimea, which was Mamai's power base.

== Partnership with Mamai ==
When Khan ʿAbdallāh died in 1370, the all-powerful beglerbeg Mamai replaced him on the throne with Muḥammad-Sulṭān, apparently the dead khan's son. In the words of the Nikon Chronicle, "In this year, the Horde prince Mamai installed for himself in the Horde a new Tsar, Mamat Sultan." The new khan was perhaps only about 9 years old. While coins began to be struck in his name at Orda (either a city or Mamai's camp), at the traditional capital Sarai Mamai apparently employed his own wife, Tulun Beg Khanum, the daughter of Berdi Beg Khan, as a stopgap ruler in 1370–1371, before installing Muḥammad-Sulṭān there at the end of 1371 or beginning of 1372.

The narrative and numismatic sources provide fragmented and sometimes contradictory evidence about the khan's reign. Muḥammad-Sulṭān appears to have been recognized briefly at Sarai, while Mamai had Prince Dmitrij Konstantinovič of Suzdal' advance on Bolghar and force the local ruler Ḥasan to recognize Muḥammad-Sulṭān as his khan. In the name of Muḥammad-Sulṭān, in 1370 Mamai issued a diploma of investiture (yarlik) with the Grand Principality of Vladimir for Prince Mihail Aleksandrovič of Tver', although the grand princely throne was occupied by Dmitrij Ivanovič of Moscow. Mihail, however, failed to dislodge Dmitrij of Moscow, in both 1370 and 1371. It was also in Muḥammad-Sulṭān's name that Mamai gave trade privileges to the Polish city of Cracow in 1372.

More disappointment awaited Mamai, as his protégé Muḥammad-Sulṭān was chased out of Sarai in 1372 by Urus Khan, a distant cousin also descended from Jochi's son Tuqa-Timur, who had taken over the former Ulus of Orda in the eastern part of the Golden Horde. Urus Beg was expelled by a Shibanid, Īl Beg, in 1374. Mamai seized the city again, and reinstated Muḥammad-Sulṭān later in 1374, before having to attend to the Lithuanian threat on his western frontier. Left to his own devices, Muḥammad-Sulṭān was expelled from Sarai once more by Urus Beg in 1374. These reverses eroded Mamai's authority over the Russian princes, and in 1374 Dmitrij of Moscow refused to recognize Muḥammad-Sulṭān as his overlord and to pay tribute to the khan and his beglerbeg. Mamai retaliated, by sacking Dmitrij's ally Novosil' and raiding the lands of Dmitrij's father-in-law Dmitrij of Suzdal'. On the death of Mamai's rival Ḥājjī Cherkes in (old) Astrakhan in 1375, Mamai was able to induce the new ruler of the city to recognize Muḥammad-Sulṭān as khan. However, Mamai's subsequent attempt to displace Dmitrij of Moscow through Mihail Aleksandrovič of Tver' failed, again. At Sarai Urus Beg was replaced by Qāghān Beg, the son of Īl Beg, who incited the Russian princes to force Bolghar into submission to him, rather than Mamai and Muḥammad-Sulṭān. Dmitrij of Moscow duly availed himself of this opportunity for plunder, blocking Mamai's way and sending Dmitrij of Suzdal' and Dmitrij Mihajlovič Volynskij to attack Bolghar. They met with success, forcing the local ruler Asan (Ḥasan) to submit to Qāghān Beg in 1377. Khan Muḥammad-Sulṭān was present in Bolghar, and together with Ḥasan had to plead for peace and pay an indemnity to the Russian princes. For reasons that are unclear, his regular coinage at Orda ceased about this time, although coins continued to be minted in his name elsewhere, at Kungur, until 1379. While Mamai was able to use the subsequent dissent between the Russian princes and Qāghān Beg to defeat the forces of Suzdal' and sack Nižnij Novgorod in 1377, he suffered a defeat at the hands of Dmitrij of Moscow at the Voža river in 1378.

== Death ==
Mamai's difficulties and Muḥammad-Sulṭān reaching more mature years may have led to tension between them, possibly reflected in the khan's absence in Bolghar in 1377 and the end of his coinage at Orda. Despite his embarrassing defeat at the hands of the Russian princes, Mamai still exercised complete control at the court of "his Tsar... who controlled nothing by himself in the Horde, and did not dare do anything before Prince Mamai." The Nikon Chronicle proceeds to relate that Mamai now murdered his own 18-year-old khan and his supporters, fearing the people's attachment to him. Whether this was so, Mamai replaced this khan with a new protégé, Tūlāk, in whose name a diploma of investiture was issued on 28 February 1379 for the would-be Russian Metropolitan Mihail (Mitjaj) on his way to Constantinople in 1379.

== Genealogy ==
- Genghis Khan
- Jochi
- Tuqa-Timur
- Kay-Timur
- Abay
- Minkasar
- ʿAbdallāh
- Muḥammad-Sulṭān

(as identified by Gaev 2002)

== See also ==
- List of khans of the Golden Horde

== Sources ==
- Bosworth, C. E., The New Islamic Dynasties, New York, 1996.
- Fren (Frähn), H. M., Monety Hanov Ulusa Džučieva ili Zolotoj Ordy, St Petersburg, 1832.
- Gaev, A. G., "Genealogija i hronologija Džučidov," Numizmatičeskij sbornik 3 (2002) 9-55.
- Grekov, B. D., and A. J. Jakubovskij, Zolotaja orda i eë padenie. Moscow, 1950.
- Grigor'ev, A. P., "Zolotoordynskie hany 60-70-h godov XIV v.: hronologija pravlenii," Istriografija i istočnikovedenie stran Azii i Afriki 7 (1983) 9-54.
- Howorth, H. H., History of the Mongols from the 9th to the 19th Century. Part II.1. London, 1880.
- Judin, V. P., Utemiš-hadži, Čingiz-name, Alma-Ata, 1992.
- May, T., The Mongol Empire. Edinburgh, 2018.
- Mirgaleev, I. M., Političeskaja istorija Zolotoj Ordy perioda pravlenija Toktamyš-hana, Kazan', 2003.
- Nasonov, A. N., Mongoly i Rus', Moscow, 1940.
- Počekaev, R. J., Cari ordynskie: Biografii hanov i pravitelej Zolotoj Ordy. Saint Petersburg, 2010.
- Polnoe sobranie russkih letopisej 11, St Petersburg, 1897.
- Sabitov, Ž. M., Genealogija "Tore", Astana, 2008.
- Safargaliev, M. G., Raspad Zolotoj Ordy. Saransk, 1960.
- Sagdeeva, R. Z., Serebrjannye monety hanov Zolotoj Ordy, Moscow, 2005.
- Savel'ev, P., Monety džučidov, džagataidov, dželairidov, St Petersburg, 1857.
- Sidorenko, V. A., "Hronologija pravlenii zolotoordynskih hanov 1357-1380 gg.," Materialov po arheologii, istorii i ètnografii Tavrii 7 (2000) 267–288.
- Thackston, W. M. (trans.), Khwandamir, Habibu's-siyar. Tome Three. Cambridge, MA, 1994.
- Tizengauzen, V. G. (trans.), Sbornik materialov, otnosjaščihsja k istorii Zolotoj Ordy. Izvlečenija iz arabskih sočinenii, republished as Istorija Kazahstana v arabskih istočnikah. 1. Almaty, 2005.
- Tizengauzen, V. G. (trans.), Sbornik materialov otnosjaščihsja k istorii Zolotoj Ordy. Izvlečenija iz persidskih sočinenii, republished as Istorija Kazahstana v persidskih istočnikah. 4. Almaty, 2006.
- Vernadsky, G., The Mongols and Russia, New Haven, 1953.
- Vohidov, Š. H. (trans.), Istorija Kazahstana v persidskih istočnikah. 3. Muʿizz al-ansāb. Almaty, 2006.

Preceded by ʿAbdallāh and Tulun Beg Khanum	Khan of the Golden Horde; 1370–1379	Succeeded by Tūlāk
