= Joseph Vladimirov =

Russian painter

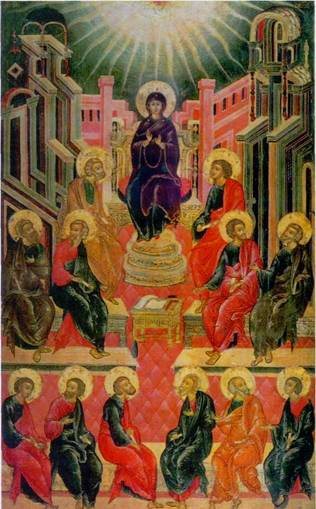
Descent of the Holy Spirit upon the Apostles by Joseph Vladimirov, Trinity Church Nikitniky, 1666

Joseph Vladimirov (Russian: Иосиф Владимиров) (active 1642–1666) was a Russian painter and art theorist of the 17th century.

== Biography ==
Vladimirov was born in Yaroslavl to iconographer Vladimir Titov. He grew up in the settlement Tolchkovo, in the parish of St. John the Baptist Church, Yaroslavl. In 1646, he lived in the Spasskaya Sloboda with his brother Sava, a priest of the church of Peter of Kiev.

In the years 1642-1644 he was summoned to Moscow and participated in the execution of the paintings for the Assumption Cathedral of the Kremlin. It is known that he was the one to paint icons for the Kremlin Armoury. Also, he took part in painting the walls of the Cathedral of the Archangel (from 1652), Trinity Church in Nikitniki (1652–1653) in Moscow, and Cathedral of the Dormition in Rostov (1659). Together with Simon Ushakov he decorated the royal gates to the church in the Kremlin Palace of Evdokia worked on decorations for the north door to the Cathedral of St. Basil, and repaired five local icons and holy gates. In August 1660, led by Ivan Filateva he worked on repairing wall paintings of the Assumption Cathedral of Moscow.

In September 1657, Vladimirov authored a treatise (addressed to Simon Ushakov), where he advocated the use of chiaroscuro in icon painting. He believed that this method would bring art closer to nature.
