= Tulun Beg Khanum =

Ruler of the Golden Horde from 1370 to 1371

Khan of the Golden Horde Western Half (Blue Horde)
- Reign: 1370–1371
- Predecessor: ʿAbdallāh
- Successor: Muḥammad-Sulṭān
- Died: 1386
- Spouse: Mamai; Tokhtamysh
- Dynasty: Borjigin
- Father: Berdi Beg
- Religion: Islam

Tulun Beg Khanum (تولون بک خانم; died 1386) was a princess of the Golden Horde at the time of the Great Troubles. Exceptionally for this political formation, she served as monarch and had her name inscribed on coins minted in 1370–1371 at Sarai and Mokhshi. She was the only female monarch of the state.

== Life ==
The origins and identity of Tulun Beg Khanum are not stated expressly, but she has been identified plausibly as the otherwise unnamed daughter of Khan Berdi Beg, who was married to the kingmaker Mamai. This would make Tulun Beg the last monarch of the Golden Horde demonstrably descended from Batu Khan.

It appears that she served as a stopgap ruler, appointed by the beglerbeg Mamai to reign between the death of his protégé Khan ʿAbdallāh (r. 1361–1370) and his next protégé, Khan Muḥammad-Sulṭān (r. 1371–1379). She is titled king (khan) on some coins and queen (khanum) on others. She was the only woman on the Khan's throne in the Ulus of Jochi.

At the end of 1371 or the beginning of 1372, Mamai replaced Tulun Beg on the throne with the young Muḥammad-Sulṭān. Following his defeat by the Russians at Kulikovo in 1380, Mamai was defeated by a new Khan of the Golden Horde, Tokhtamysh, and fled to the Crimea, where he was murdered in late 1380 or early 1381 by agents of Tokhtamysh, after being turned out by the local Genoese and by his own governor. Even before Mamai's death, his harem fell into Tokhtamysh's hands after the Battle of the Kalka, and Tulun Beg married the new Khan Tokhtamysh. He treated the corpse of his former rival Mamai with honor and extended his protection over Mamai's family.

Tulun Beg appears to have been implicated in an obscure plot against Tokhtamysh in 1386, and was executed. In the words of the Russian Rogozh Chronicle, "This same year, Tsar Tokhtamysh himself killed his own Tsaritsa, named Tovlunbek." Related to these events may be the unexplained appearance of coins with the name of the long-dead Berdi Beg, Tulun Beg's father, in this period.

== Genealogy ==
- Genghis Khan
- Jochi
- Batu Khan
- Toqoqan
- Mengu-Timur
- Toghrilcha
- Uzbeg Khan
- Jani Beg
- Berdi Beg
- Tulun Beg Khanum

== Sources ==
- Bosworth, C. E., The New Islamic Dynasties, New York, 1996.
- Grigor'ev, A. P., "Zolotoordynskie hany 60-70-h godov XIV v.: hronologija pravlenii," Istriografija i istočnikovedenie stran Azii i Afriki 7 (1983) 9-54.
- Howorth, H. H., History of the Mongols from the 9th to the 19th century, Part II.1, London, 1880.
- Mirgaleev, I. M., Političeskaja istorija Zolotoj Ordy perioda pravlenija Toktamyš-hana, Kazan', 2003.
- Počekaev, R. J., Cari ordynskie: Biografii hanov i pravitelej Zolotoj Ordy. Saint Petersburg, 2010a.
- Počekaev, R. J., Mamaj: Istorija “anti-geroja” v istorii, Sankt-Peterburg, 2010b.
- Sidorenko, V. A., "Hronologija pravlenii zolotoordynskih hanov 1357-1380 gg.," Materialov po arheologii, istorii i ètnografii Tavrii 7 (2000) 267-288.
- Tizengauzen, V. G. (trans.), Sbornik materialov, otnosjaščihsja k istorii Zolotoj Ordy. Izvlečenija iz arabskih sočinenii, republished as Istorija Kazahstana v arabskih istočnikah. 1. Almaty, 2005.
- Varvarovskij, J. E., Ulus Džuči v 60-70-e gody XIV veka, Kazan', 2008; posthumously published version of author's dissertation Raspad Ulusa Džuči v 60-70-e gody XIV veka (po dannym pis'mennyh istočnikov i numizmatiki, Kazan', 1994.

Preceded by ʿAbdallāh	Khan of the Golden Horde; 1370–1371	Succeeded by Muḥammad-Sulṭān
