= Cathedral of the Archangel =

- Архангельский собор
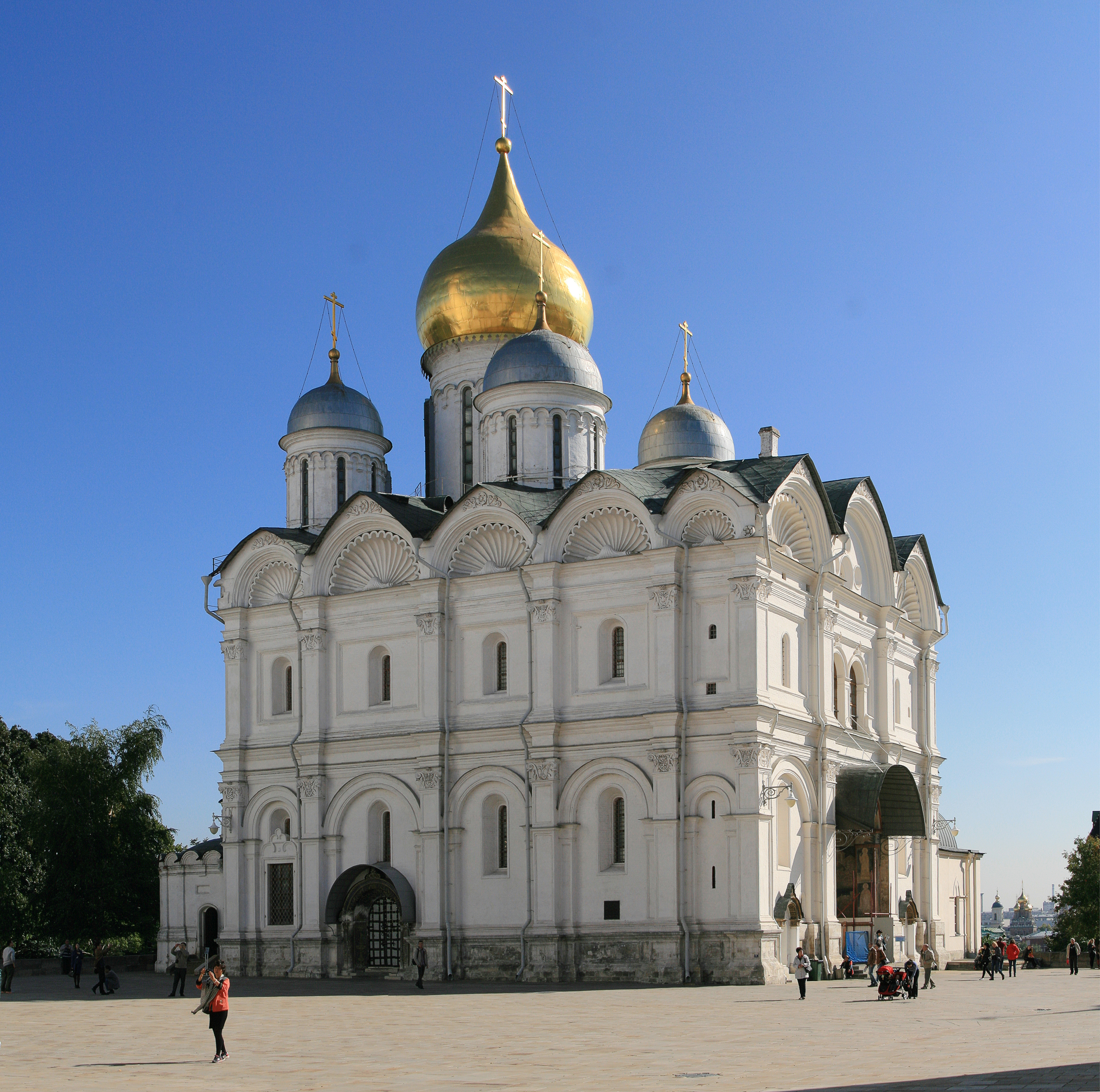
- View from Sobornaya Square
- Cathedral of the Archangel
- 55°45′01″N 37°37′04″E
- Location: Moscow
- Country: Russia
- Denomination: Russian Orthodox
- Website: Official site

History
- Dedication: Archangel Michael
- Consecrated: 1333 (stone cathedral); 1508 (current cathedral)

Architecture
- Style: Russian

The Cathedral of the Archangel (Russian: Архангельский собор, romanized: Arkhangel'skiy sobor) is a Russian Orthodox church dedicated to the Archangel Michael. It is located in Cathedral Square of the Moscow Kremlin in Russia between the Great Kremlin Palace and the Ivan the Great Bell Tower. It was the main necropolis of the tsars of Russia until the relocation of the capital to St. Petersburg.

It was constructed between 1505 and 1508 under the supervision of the Italian architect Aloisio the New on the spot of an older cathedral, built in 1333. Now it also serves as a part of Moscow Kremlin Museums.

== History ==
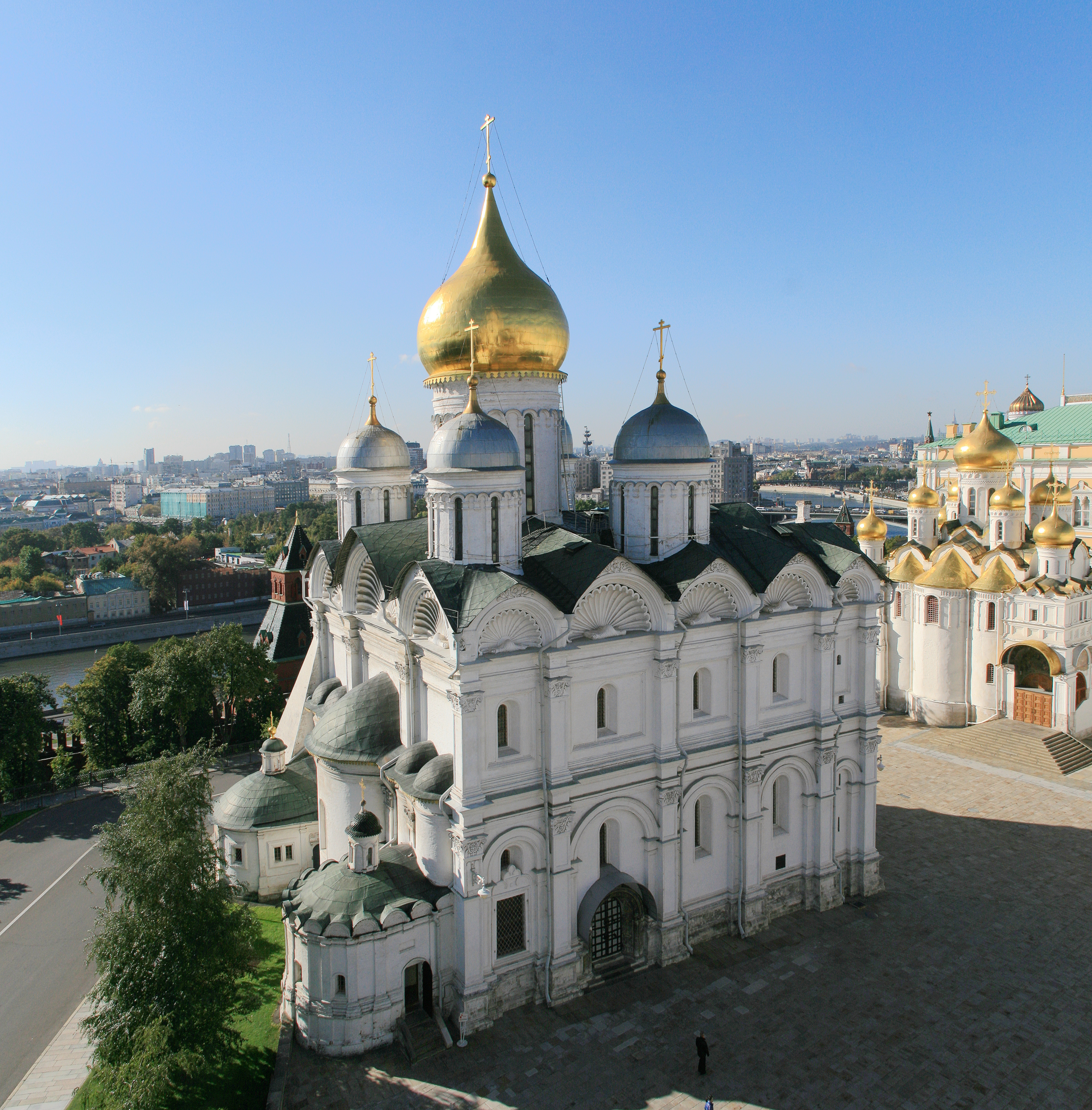
View of the Archangel Cathedral from Ivan the Great Bell Tower, with the Cathedral of the Annunciation in the background.

A precursor to the present cathedral was built in 1250, and was replaced with a stone church in 1333 by Grand Duke Ivan Kalita, who would later become the first Russian monarch to be buried in the church. In 1505, Grand Duke Ivan III, already in the midst of major renovation project for the Kremlin, turned his attention to the church, as in the case of the rebuilding of the Assumption Cathedral two decades earlier, turned to architects from Italy for assistance. An Italian, Lamberti Aloisio da Mantagnana (Aloisio the New) was invited to Moscow, and ground was broken for a new cathedral on 21 May 1505. Ivan died in the autumn of the same year, and was buried in the still unfinished building. Work on the cathedral was completed by the end of 1508, but it was not formally consecrated until 8 November 1509.

The new building incorporated many elements of the Italian Renaissance, and numerous of these details (considered “exotic” by Moscow standards) disappeared during later repairs and restorations. The interior walls were not painted with frescoes until the 1560s. A fresco of Lazar of Serbia was painted in 1564. In addition, inside the cathedral are the depictions of Saint Sava, Stefan Nemanja (Saint Simeon) and Byzantine emperor Michael VIII Palaiologos attesting to Ivan the Terrible's connection to his Serbian roots. His mother Elena Glinskaya was a daughter of Prince Vasili Lvovich Glinsky of Lithuania and Serb Princess Ana Jakšić.

The cathedral was damaged in the 1737 Kremlin Fire, and was further threatened by the construction of the predecessor of the Grand Kremlin Palace, which led to soil subsidence, and caused a slight tilt in the orientation of the walls.

Victories of the Russian military were celebrated in the Cathedral of the Archangel. All Russian tsars and grand princes were buried within the cathedral until the time of Peter the Great, along with many empresses and princes of the blood, with the sole exception of Boris Godunov. After the royal necropolis was moved to Peter and Paul Cathedral in St. Petersburg, only Tsar Peter II, who happened to die in Moscow, was interred here.

There are 54 burials in the cathedral, with 46 ornamented whitestone tombstones (1636–1637) and glazed cases made of bronze (1903). Of note is the tomb of Tsarevich Demetrius, the son of Ivan the Terrible, who was buried there in the early 17th century and was later canonized.

During the 1917 Russian Revolution, the cathedral was damaged during the fighting. Afterwards, it was closed by the Bolshevik regime. During the 1950s, along with the other surviving churches in the Moscow Kremlin, it was preserved as a museum. A large portion of the church's treasures were either transferred to the Kremlin Armory Museum, or sold overseas.

After 1992, the building was returned to the Russian Orthodox Church and occasional religious services resumed.

== Architecture ==
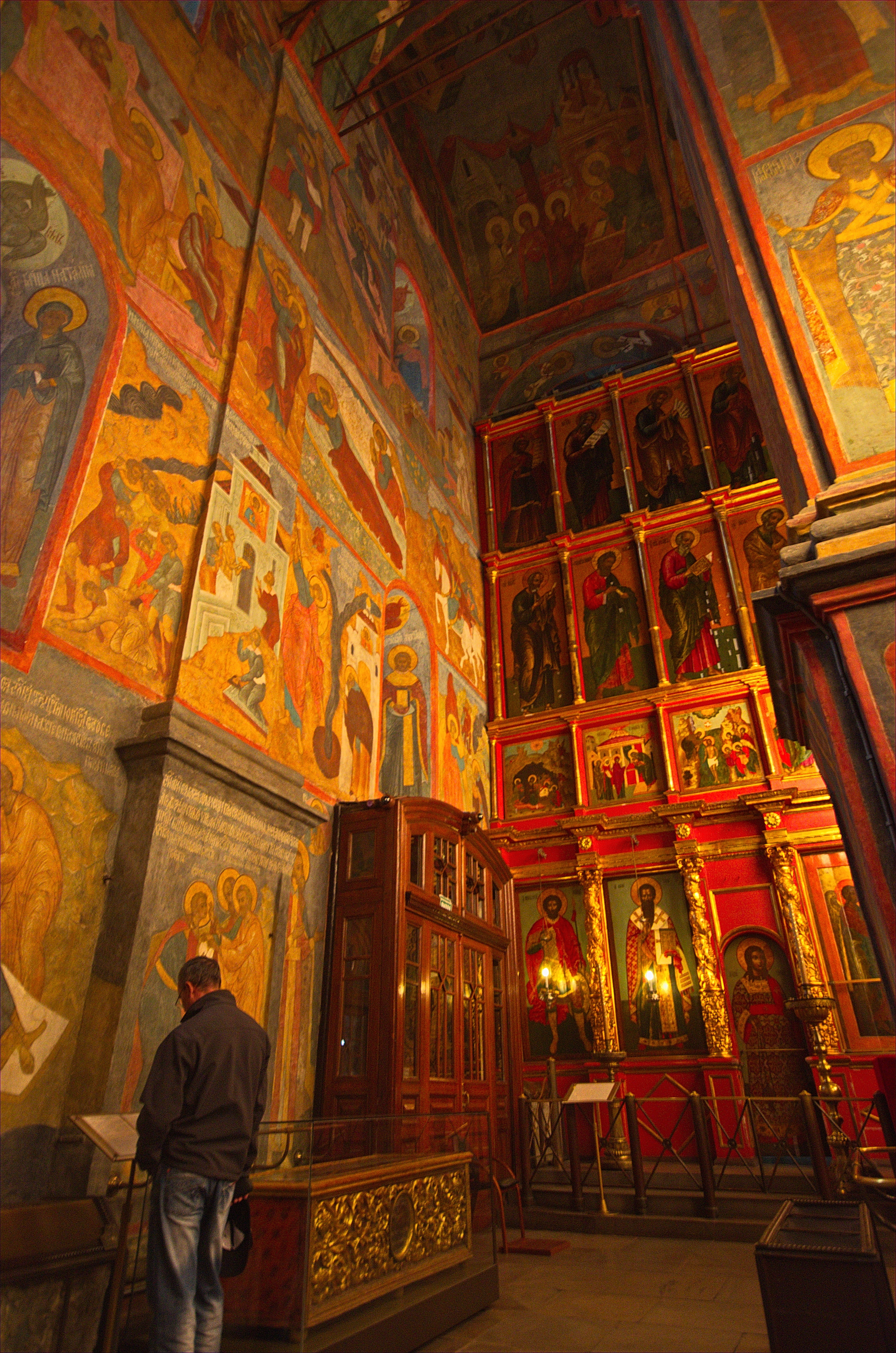
Icons of the Iconostasis in the Cathedral

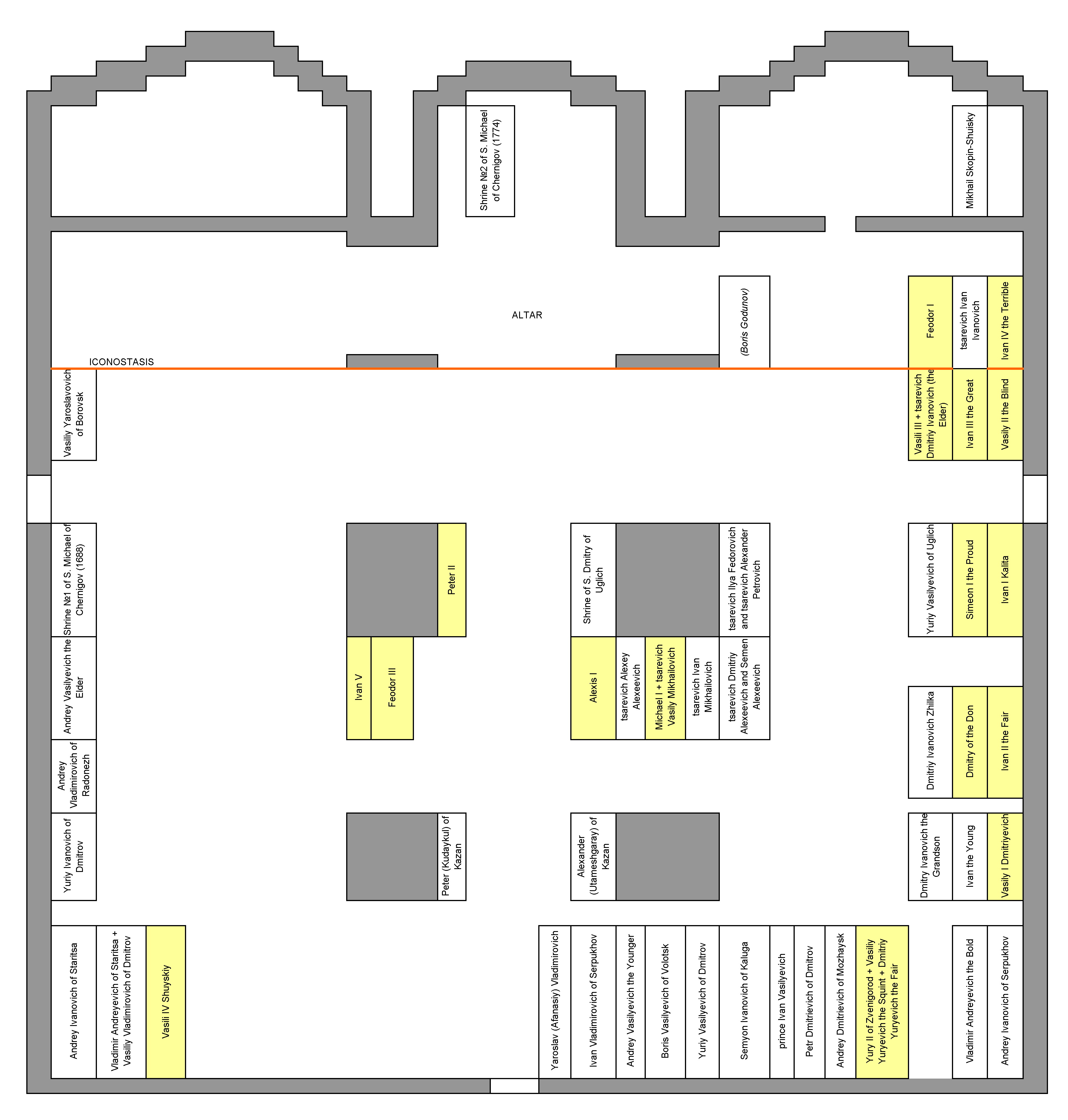
Graves of Russian tsars and Muscovite princes (scheme of Cathedral)

Compared with the other two major Kremlin cathedrals, the Archangel Cathedral is substantially different in style, despite maintaining a traditional layout. It echoes the layout of the Assumption Cathedral in its use of five domes (representing Jesus Christ and the Four Evangelists. However, the exterior ornamentation its characteristic semi-circular niches with shell-shaped ornaments and gateways with arc-shaped frames made of white limestone, which are coated with paint and decorated with floral ornaments point to the Italian Renaissance influence.

The interior of the cathedral, however, was largely constructed in a manner typical for Russian churches. The large iconostasis of the cathedral of the archangel, 13 meters high, dates from 1678 to 1681. The icon of Archangel Michael, the oldest in the iconostasis, is believed to have been created for Princess Eudoxia, the wife of Dmitri Donskoi to the memory the victory in the Battle of Kulikovo.

The wall frescoes date to the 16th and 17th centuries. Some were painted by Yakov of Kazan, Stepan of Ryazan, Joseph Vladimirov and others between 1652 and 1666.

== Notable burials ==
- Alexis I (1629–1676)
- Dmitry Donskoy (1350–1389)
- Feodor I ("the Blessed", 1557–1598)
- Feodor III (1661–1682)
- Ivan I of Moscow (Ivan Kalita, 1288–1340/41)
- Ivan II of Moscow ("the Fair", 1326–1359)
- Ivan III ("the Great", 1440–1505)
- Ivan IV ("the Terrible", 1530–1584)
- Ivan V (1666–1696)
- Michael I (1596–1645)
- Peter II (1715–1730)
- Simeon of Moscow ("the Proud", 1317–1353)
- Vasily I of Moscow (1371–1425)
- Vasily II of Moscow ("the Blind", 1415–1462)
- Vasili III (1479–1533)
- Vasili IV (c. 1552 – 1612)
- Yury of Zvenigorod (1374–1434)

== Sources ==
- Klein, Mina. The Kremlin: Citadel of History. MacMillan Publishing Company (1973). ISBN 0-02-750830-7
- Tropkin, Alexander. The Moscow Kremlin: history of Russia's unique monument. Publishing House "Russkaya Zhizn" (1980). ASIN: B0010XM7BQ
