= Tsarevich (Fabergé egg) =

1912 Imperial Fabergé egg

Tsarevich Fabergé egg
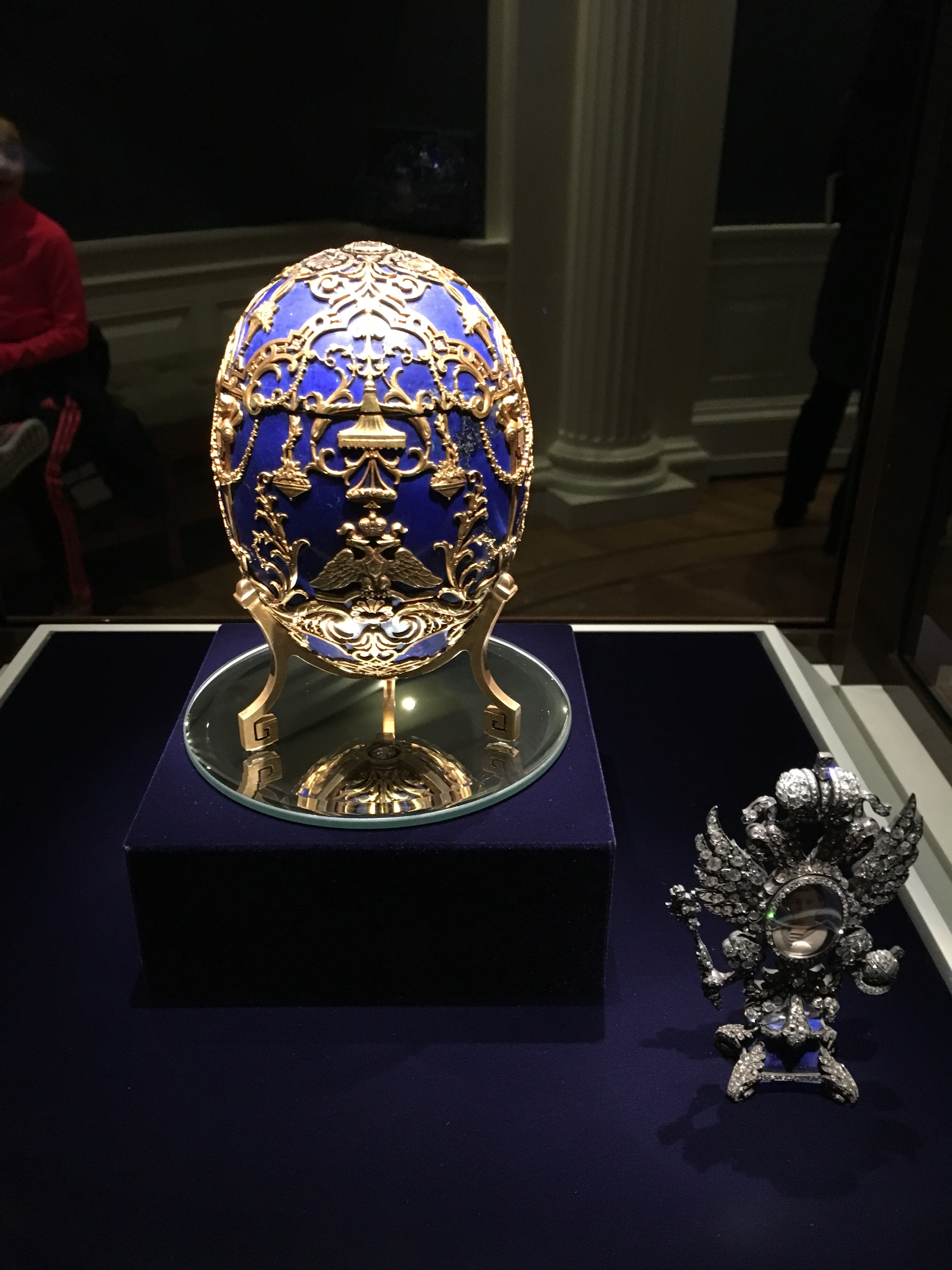
- The egg and its surprise. The original stand is lost, the one in the photo was made in 2012 and is similar to the original one
- Year delivered: 1912
- Customer: Nicholas II
- Recipient: Alexandra Fedorovna

Current owner
- Individual or institution: Virginia Museum of Fine Arts
- Year of acquisition: 1947

Design and materials
- Workmaster: Henrik Wigström
- Materials used: Lapis Lazuli, gold, diamond
- Height: 146.1 millimetres (5.75 in)
- Width: 101.6 millimetres (4.00 in)
- Surprise: Framed portrait of Tsarevich Alexei

The Tsarevich egg, also known as the Czarevich egg, is a Fabergé egg, one of a series of jewelled eggs made under the supervision of Peter Carl Fabergé. It was created in 1912 for Empress Alexandra Fyodorovna as a tribute by Fabergé to her son the Tsarevich Alexei (Alexei). The egg is currently in the Virginia Museum of Fine Arts in Richmond, Virginia, US.

== Design ==
The egg is about 5 3/4 inches (15 cm) tall on its stand, with a diameter of 4 inches (10 cm). The outer shell is blue lapis lazuli, with architectural, Louis XV-style gold cagework in a design of leafy scrolls. The gold motifs cover each joint, making the egg look as if it was carved from a single block of lapis. The goldwork includes two Imperial double-headed eagles, as well as cupids, canopies, floral scrolls, flower baskets and garlands. Most of the decorative elements are based on designs by Jean Bérain.

Two large diamonds, one at top and one at bottom, are encrusted into the egg's surface, showing the initials of Tsarina Alexandra Fyodorovna, the year 1912 and the Imperial crown. The location of the original stand is unknown, however it is thought to have not made it out of Russia when purchased by antiques dealer Armand Hammer.

== Surprise ==
The "surprise" inside is a Russian double-headed Imperial eagle with a miniature portrait of the Tsarevich Alexei, set in platinum and encrusted with diamonds. The Imperial eagle holds the orb and sceptre representative of the Romanov crown jewels. The intricate frame sits on a lapis lazuli base and can be completely removed from inside the egg. The portrait shows Alexei in his sailor suit, a favorite of the Tsarevich's. The original double-sided watercolor miniature portrait has suffered damage and is still in the collection of the Virginia Museum of Fine Arts. The current portrait on display is an archival photograph. Inside the egg, an engraved golden disc with a rose window design serves as a platform for the portrait frame.

== History ==
Fabergé created the egg as a tribute to Tsarevich Alexei. Unknown to all but the royal family, Alexei was expected to die of hemophilia and was at one point so close to death that the Russian Imperial Court had already drawn up his death certificate. When Alexei survived, Fabergé, who knew of the Tsarevich's health, created the egg for Alexei's mother as a tribute to the miracle of his survival.

Subsequent owners included antiques dealer Armand Hammer, who moved from Paris to New York in the early 1930s. Philanthropist Lillian Thomas Pratt (1876–1947) of Fredericksburg, Virginia, purchased the egg in New York from Hammer in 1933–34. The egg was bequeathed by her in 1947 to the Virginia Museum of Fine Arts in Richmond, Virginia, where it remains on permanent view.

== See also ==
- Objet d'art
- Colonnade (Fabergé egg)
