= Alexandra Velyaminova =

- Grand Princess of Moscow
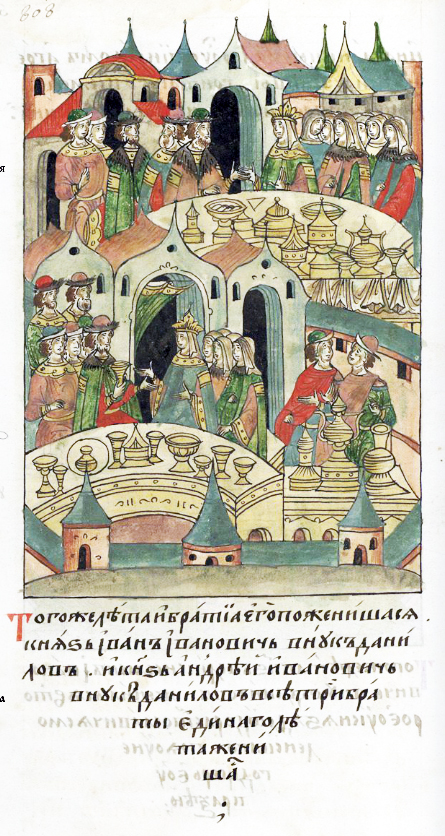
- Wedding of Ivan and Alexandra, miniature from the Illustrated Chronicle of Ivan the Terrible
- Tenure: 1353–1359
- Died: 26 December 1364
- Spouse: Ivan II of Moscow
- Issue: Dmitry Donskoy; Lyuba Ivanovna; Ivan Ivanovich of Zvenigorod; Maria Ivanovna
- Alexandra Vasilyevna Velyaminova
- Father: Vasily Velyaminov
- Religion: Russian Orthodox

Alexandra Vasilyevna Velyaminova (Russian: Александра Васильевна Вельяминова; died 26 December 1364) was the grand princess consort of Moscow as the second wife of Ivan II of Moscow from 1345.

== Life ==
She was the daughter of Vasily Velyaminov, a tysyatsky of Moscow who held great power. The marriage took place in 1345. Following the death of Ivan II, their son Dmitry succeeded him.

== Issue ==
Alexandra had four children with Ivan II:

- Dmitry Donskoy (12 October 1350 – 19 May 1389), succeeded as grand prince of Moscow.
- Lyuba Ivanovna, assumed the name "Anna" following her marriage to Dmitry Mikhailovich, prince of Volhynia (d. 1399); her husband was a son of Karijotas
- Ivan Ivanovich (c. 1356 – October 1364), prince of Zvenigorod
- Maria Ivanovna

Russian royalty
Vacant Title last held by Maria Alexandrovna of Tver	Grand Princess of Moscow; 1353–1359	Vacant Title next held by Eudoxia of Moscow
