= The Resurrection of Lazarus =

Painting by Henry Ossawa Tanner

- La Résurrection de Lazare (French)
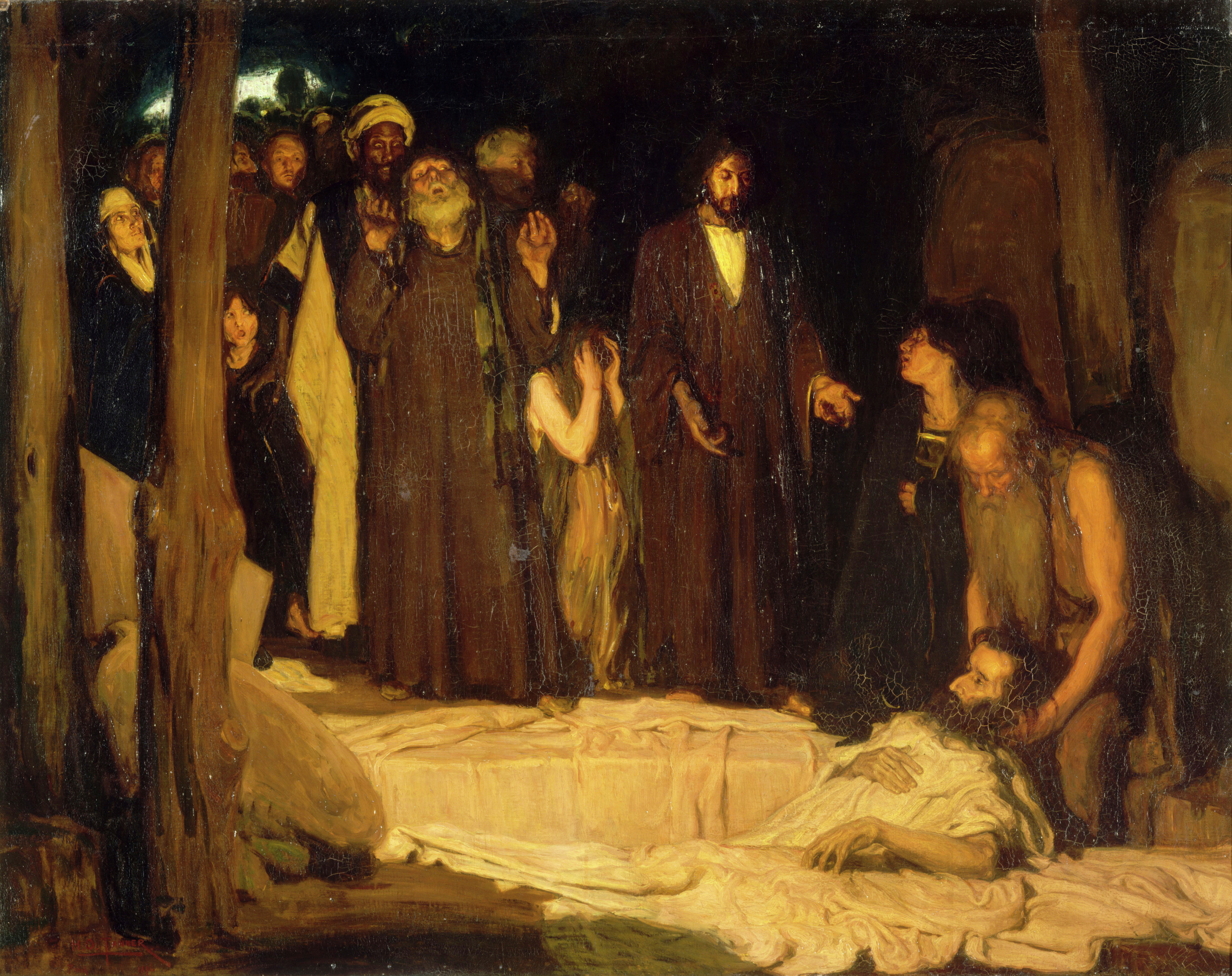
- Artist: Henry Ossawa Tanner
- Year: 1896
- Medium: Oil on canvas
- Dimensions: 90.7 cm × 120.5 cm (35.7 in × 47.4 in)
- Location: Musée d'Orsay, Paris

The Resurrection of Lazarus is a painting by Henry Ossawa Tanner entered into the Paris Salon in 1897 and winning a third place medal. During his lifetime, this was the painting for which he was most known, his "masterwork". Since his death in 1937, secular tastes have pushed The Banjo Lesson to the top place in public esteem. The work was purchased by the French government (a rare honor for someone not a French citizen) for display in its Luxemburg museum. Today the painting is held by the Musée d'Orsay.

During Tanner's lifetime, the painting was never exhibited in the United States, having been bought at its first exhibition in France. It was finally exhibited in the U.S. in 2012 as part of the show Henry Ossawa Tanner: Modern Spirit, organized by the Pennsylvania Academy of Fine Arts.

== Biblical narrative ==
The painting illustrates John 11 from the Bible, in which Christ raises his friend Lazarus from death. It catches the moment of resurrection when Lazarus opens his eyes and the reaction of the crowd which came to see. Women thought to be Mary and Martha (sisters to Lazarus) kneel to either side of Jesus, Mary with her head in her hands, Martha looking up at him.

The scene is an adaption of the biblical text; in that work, the people did not enter the tomb but Christ told Lazarus, "Come forth."

Tanner's crowd of Jewish people run "from a range of locales across North Africa and the Near East." They are not a racially homogeneous mixture and represent a variety of Jewish peoples.

== Effects on Tanner's career ==
The purchase of the painting by the French government placed Tanner into a small group of artists who did not have to submit their paintings to an admissions panel for entry into Paris Salons. Beyond that, Tanner's work now held "authoritative cache and the zeal of official approbation," and it was considered that anything he chose to paint would have an instant market.

The painting also gained Tanner the attention of American businessman Rodman Wanamaker who saw it in Paris and was impressed by Tanner's religious sentiments and attempts at Orientalism. He wanted Tanner to have a "firsthand look at the setting of the biblical stories he painted" and paid Tanner's travel expenses in the spring of 1897 to the Near East (Palestine and Egypt).

Tanner would make multiple trips to Palestine, Egypt, Algeria and Morocco in his lifetime, creating numerous paintings of these trips. He would incorporate details noticed on these trips in his paintings. One example is the dress style of Mary in The Annunciation, which is remarked on as a particular dress style in Palestine.

Works coming out of this trip include The Jew's Wailing Place (also final painting), Lions in the Desert, Lion drinking, A Water Carrier, and A Mosque in Cairo.

== See also ==
- List of paintings by Henry Ossawa Tanner
