= Ivan II of Moscow =

Prince of Moscow from 1353 to 1359

Ivan II the Fair
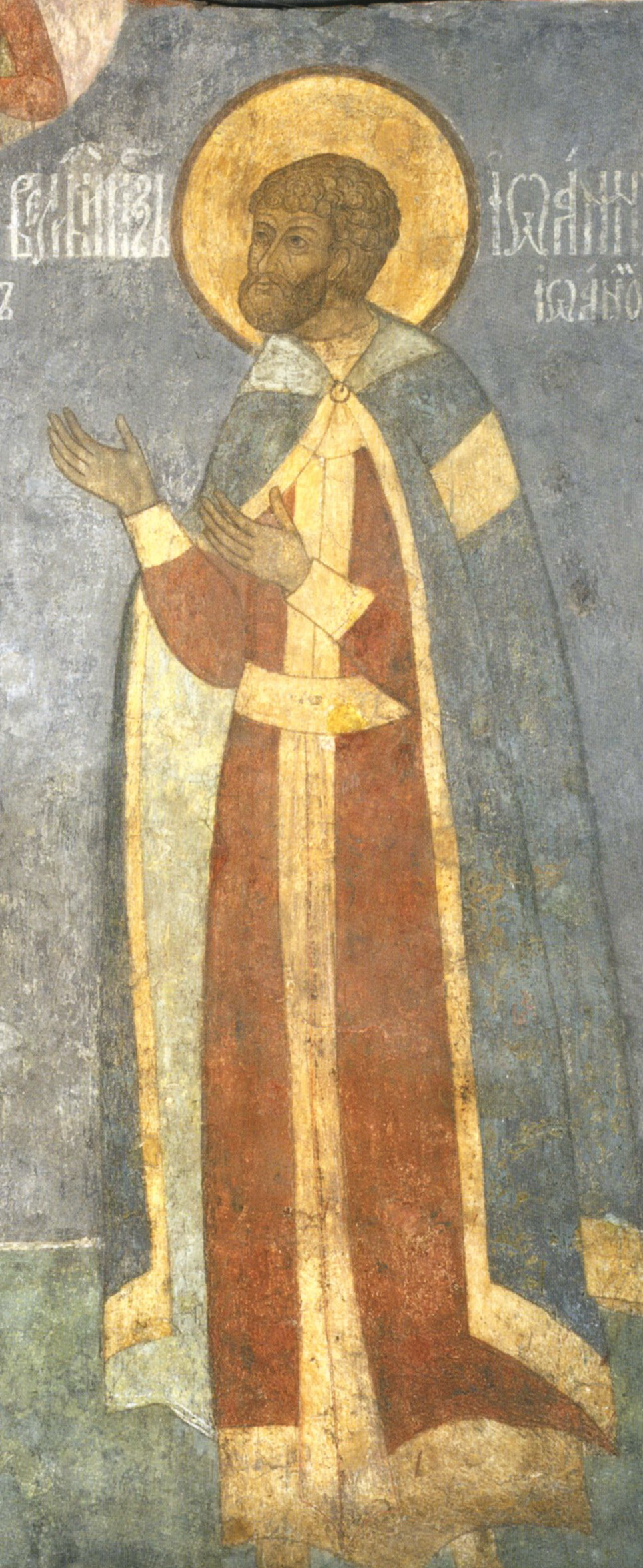
- Fresco in the Cathedral of the Archangel (1652)

Prince of Moscow
- Reign: 27 April 1353 – 13 November 1359
- Predecessor: Simeon I
- Successor: Dmitri I
- Born: 30 March 1326; Moscow
- Died: 13 November 1359 (aged 33); Moscow
- Burial: Principality of Moscow
- Spouse: Fedosia of Bryansk; Alexandra Velyaminova
- Issue more...: Dmitri Donskoi
- Dynasty: Rurik
- Father: Ivan I of Moscow
- Mother: Helena
- Religion: Russian Orthodox

Ivan II Ivanovich the Fair (Russian: Иван II Иванович Красный, romanized: Ivan II Ivanovich Krasnyy; 30 March 1326 – 13 November 1359) was Prince of Moscow and Grand Prince of Vladimir from 1353 to 1359. Until that date, he had ruled the towns of Ruza and Zvenigorod. He was the second son of Ivan Kalita, and succeeded his brother Simeon the Proud, who died of the Black Death.

== Reign ==
Upon succeeding his brother and because of increased civil strife among the Golden Horde, Ivan briefly toyed with the idea of abandoning traditional Moscow allegiance to the Mongols and allying himself with Lithuania, a growing power in the west. This policy was quickly abandoned and Ivan asserted his allegiance to the Golden Horde.

Contemporaries described Ivan as a pacific, apathetic ruler, who didn't flinch even when Algirdas of Lithuania captured his father-in-law's capital, Bryansk. He also allowed Oleg of Riazan to burn villages on his territory. However, Orthodox churchmen aided in consolidating the power of the Prince of Moscow. He received much aid from the capable Metropolitan Alexius. Like his brother, Ivan II was not as successful as his father or grandfather with regard to territorial expansion. Nevertheless, he was able to annex areas southwest of Moscow, including the areas of Borovsk, and Vereya.

He is buried in the Cathedral of the Archangel Michael in Moscow.

== Family ==
Ivan was born on 30 March 1326 in Moscow, the seventh child and third son of Ivan I of Moscow and his wife, Helena. Ivan was married twice. In 1341, Ivan married his first wife Fedosia Dmitrievna of Bryansk. She was a daughter of Dmitry Romanovich, Prince of Bryansk. She died childless in autumn 1342.

Ivan remained a widower for three years. In 1345, Ivan married his second wife, Alexandra Vassilievna Velyaminova. She was a daughter of Vasily Velyaminov, a mayor of Moscow. They had at least four children:

- Dmitry Donskoy (12 October 1350 – 19 May 1389). His successor as Prince of Moscow ;
- A daughter married Prince Bobrok of Volhynia ;
- Ivan Ivanovich, Prince of Zvenigorod (c. 1356 – October 1364) ;
- Maria Ivanovna.

Regnal titles
Preceded by Simeon	Prince of Moscow; 1353–1359	Succeeded by Dmitriy Donskoy
