= Dmitry Donskoy =

Prince of Moscow from 1359 to 1389

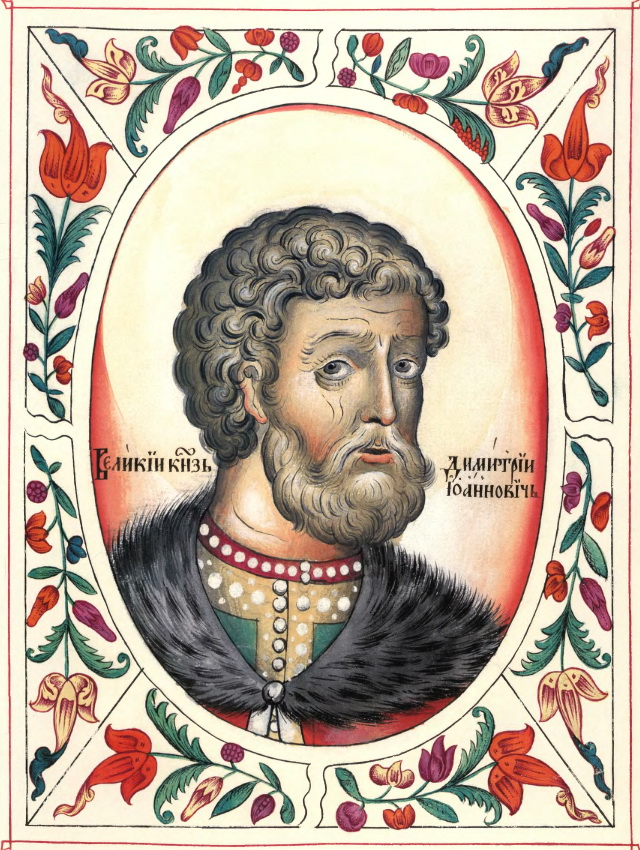
- Portrait in the Tsarsky titulyarnik, 1672

Prince of Moscow
- Reign: 1359–1389
- Predecessor: Ivan II
- Successor: Vasily I

Grand Prince of Vladimir
- Reign: 1362–1389
- Predecessor: Dmitry of Suzdal
- Successor: Vasily I
- Born: 12 October 1350; Moscow
- Died: 19 May 1389 (aged 38); Moscow
- Burial: Cathedral of the Archangel, Moscow Kremlin
- Consort: Eudoxia Dmitriyevna
- Issue more...: Vasily I of Moscow; Yury of Zvenigorod
Names
- Dmitry Ivanovich
- Dynasty: Rurik
- Father: Ivan II of Moscow
- Mother: Alexandra Velyaminova
- Religion: Russian Orthodox

Dmitry Ivanovich Donskoy (Note: Also spelled as Dimitrii, Dmitri, Dmitrii, or Demetrius; also known as Dmitry of the Don.) (Russian: Дми́трий Ива́нович Донско́й; 12 October 1350 – 19 May 1389) was Prince of Moscow from 1359 and Grand Prince of Vladimir from 1362 until his death in 1389.

Dmitry became prince at the age of nine following the death of his father, Ivan II. During the early years of his reign, Metropolitan Alexius effectively ruled Moscow on Dmitry's behalf and equated the interests of the Russian Orthodox Church with those of Moscow. In 1360, as a result of political turmoil in the Golden Horde, Dmitry temporarily lost the Grand Principality of Vladimir to Dmitry of Suzdal. However, two years later, the latter abandoned his claim and arranged for his daughter, Eudoxia, to marry Dmitry.

He was the first prince of Moscow to openly challenge Mongol authority in Russia. His nickname, Donskoy ('of the Don'), alludes to his great victory against the Tatars at the Battle of Kulikovo in 1380, which took place on the Don River. Although Moscow was sacked by Tokhtamysh two years later, Moscow's prestige among the Russian principalities greatly increased. Dmitry spent his final years strengthening his authority among the Russian princes, and by the end of his reign, he had permanently united the thrones of Moscow and Vladimir.

In Russian historiography, he is regarded as a Russian national hero and a central figure of medieval Russia. He was canonized as a saint by the Russian Orthodox Church in 1988, and his feast day is on 19 May.

== Reign ==
=== Early life ===
Dmitry Ivanovich was born in Moscow on 12 October 1350. He was the eldest son of Ivan II of Moscow with his second wife, Alexandra Velyaminova, the daughter of Vasily Velyaminov, the tysyatsky (military commander) of Moscow. Ivan died on 13 November 1359, when Dmitry was nine years old. During Dmitry's minority, real power rested with the late grand prince's advisers, led by Velyaminov. Metropolitan Alexius supervised Dmitry's upbringing and education. He also wielded significant influence within the government.

=== Struggle against Suzdal ===
Following the assassination of Berdi Beg in 1359, there was political turmoil in the Golden Horde. In 1360, the Grand Principality of Vladimir, which had been held by Dmitry's predecessors, was transferred to Dmitry Konstantinovich of Suzdal by the decision of Nawruz Beg, who was khan at the time. At the same time, Novgorod invited Dmitry Konstantinovich to reign in the city, further weakening Moscow's position. In 1362, Dmitry Ivanovich received a patent (yarlyk) to the throne from one of the rival khans, Murad. Afterward, the boyars (nobility) of Moscow, Dmitry Ivanovich, and his cousin, Vladimir Andreyevich of Serpukhov, assembled an army and drove Dmitry Konstantinovich from Vladimir.

As the army approached Suzdal, Dmitry Konstantinovich was forced to abandon his claim to the throne, despite receiving another patent to the grand princely throne. From 1363 to 1365, Dmitry Ivanovich helped Dmitry Konstantinovich recover the throne of Nizhny Novgorod from his younger brother, Boris, leading to a lasting peace between the two principalities that was secured by a dynastic union. In January 1366, Dmitry Ivanovich married Dmitry Konstantinovich's youngest daughter, Eudoxia. In addition, Eudoxia's elder sister, Maria, married Mikula Vasilyevich, one of the four sons of Vasily Velyaminov. From the second half of the decade, Dmitry Ivanovich began pursuing an independent policy, and in 1367, the Moscow Kremlin was rebuilt in stone for the first time. The Golden Horde's attempt to shift the balance of power failed, primarily due to political strife, which subsequently led to the rise of Mamai, who established his own entity in the western half of the Golden Horde.

=== Struggle against Tver ===
After taking the throne of Tver in 1366, Mikhail Aleksandrovich mounted a direct challenge to Moscow's pre-eminence with Lithuanian support. In response, Dmitry continued to support the appanage princes of Tver against Mikhail, including Vasily of Kashin. The conflict escalated when the Muscovite army invaded Tver. The Lithuanian army came to Mikhail's aid, but the new stone walls of Moscow were able to withstand the siege. Dmitry launched another invasion in 1370, taking advantage of Lithuanian involvement in other conflicts. The Muscovite army marched on Bryansk, while Dmitry himself launched a campaign against Tver, forcing Mikhail to flee to Lithuania again. Mikhail's son-in-law, the Lithuanian grand duke Algirdas, approached Moscow, but Dmitry was better prepared, causing Algirdas to propose a truce and retreat.

The Golden Horde also began to intervene in the in the struggle between the Russian princes. Mikhail visited Mamai's court and received the patent to the grand princely throne through his protégé Muhammad Sultan in 1371, but was unable to enforce his claim without Lithuanian assistance. Dmitry convinced the khan to restore the title to him; however, the khan did not withdraw the patent given to Mikhail, anticipating internecine strife among the Russian princes. Dmitry's payment of tribute to the khan caused discontent among the population, and on 14 December 1371, Muscovite forces defeated the troops of the Principality of Ryazan at the Battle of Skornishchevo.

Metropolitan Alexius negotiated a peace treaty with Lithuania and had Dmitry's cousin Vladimir Andreyevich marry one of the daughters of Algirdas. According to the treaty, Algirdas recognized the grand principality as Dmitry's patrimony (otchina), thereby refusing to recognize Mikhail's claim. From 1374, Dmitry refused to pay tribute to Mamai, leading to a stand-off between the two sides for the next six years.

Mikhail once again received the patent from Mamai in 1375, but Dmitry retained the loyalty of the other princes, and their combined forces defeated Mikhail's army. Mikhail made peace and acknowledged Dmitry as his "elder brother", or feudal superior. According to the treaty signed on 1 September 1375, Mikhail pledged to assist Dmitry in the event of a war with the Tatars, as Dmitry saw a clash with Mamai as inevitable.

=== Struggle against the Golden Horde ===
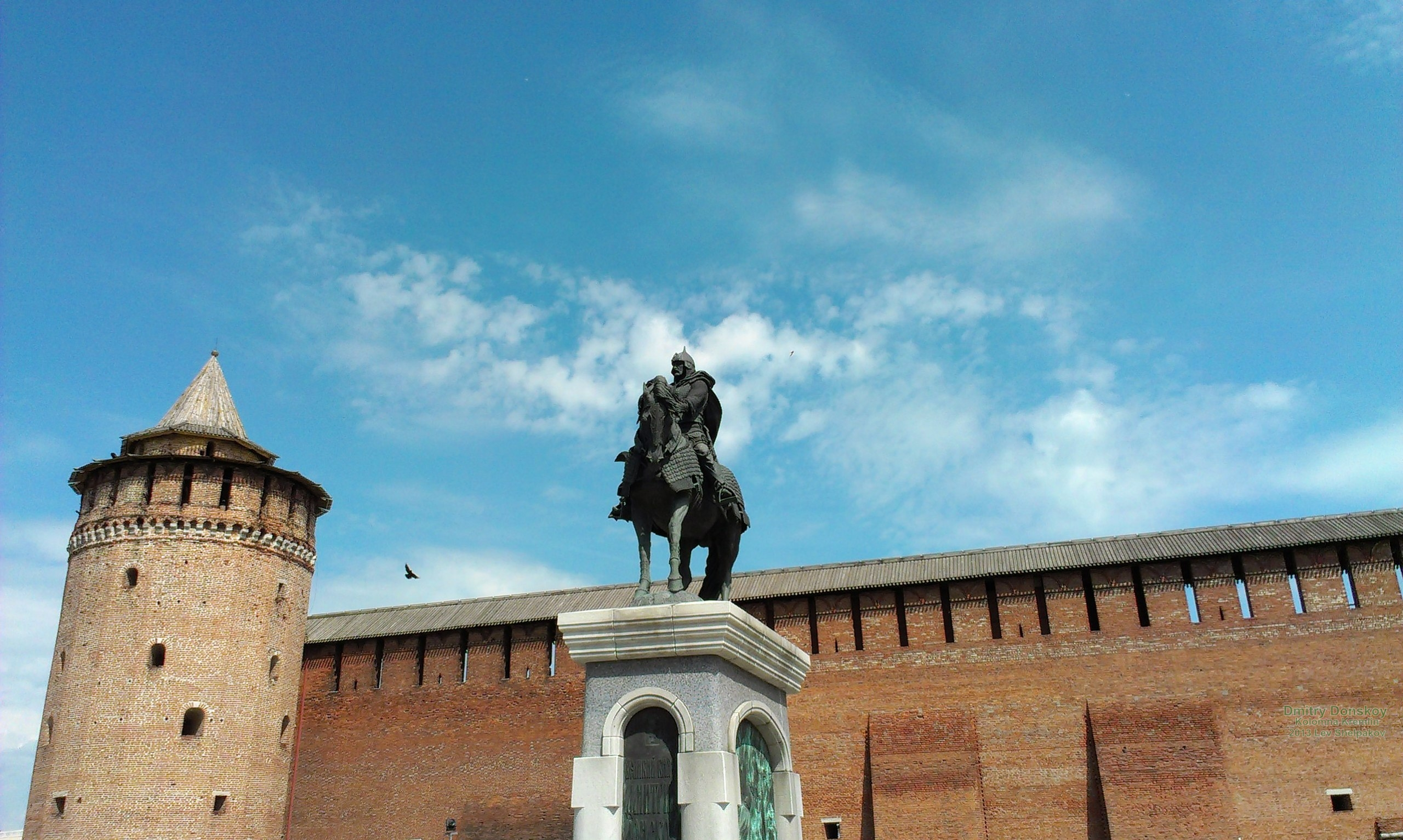
Monument to Dmitry Donskoy in front of Marinkina tower (Kolomna Kremlin)

The Mongol domination of Rus' began to crumble during Dmitry's thirty-year reign. The Golden Horde was severely weakened by civil war and dynastic rivalries. Dmitry took advantage of this lapse in Mongol authority to openly challenge the Tatars. While he kept the Khan's patent to collect taxes for all of Russia, Dmitry is also famous for leading the first Russian military victory over the Mongols. Mamai, a Mongol general and claimant to the throne, tried to punish Dmitry for attempting to increase his power. In 1378, Mamai sent a Mongol army, but it was defeated by Dmitry's forces in the Battle of Vozha River.

Two years later, Mamai personally led a large force against Moscow. Sergius of Radonezh blessed Dmitry Donskoy when he went to fight the Tatars in the signal Battle of Kulikovo field, but only after he was certain Dmitry had pursued all peaceful means of resolving the conflict. Sergius sent the two warrior monks Alexander Peresvet and his friend Oslyabya to join the Russian troops. The battle of Kulikovo was opened by a single combat between two champions. The Russian champion was Alexander Peresvet. The Golden Horde champion was Temir-Murza. The champions killed each other in the first run. Dmitry defeated the Horde. In gratitude for the victory, Dmitry established the Dormition monastery on the Dubenka River and built a church in honor of the Nativity of the Holy Theotokos over the graves of the fallen warriors.

The defeated Mamai was presently dethroned by a rival Mongol general, Tokhtamysh. That khan reasserted Mongol rule of Rus and overran Moscow in 1382 for Dmitry's resistance to Mamai. Dmitry, however, pledged his loyalty to Tokhtamysh and to the Golden Horde and was reinstated as Mongol principal tax collector and grand prince of Vladimir. Upon his death in Moscow in 1389, Dmitry was the first grand prince to bequeath his titles to his son Vasily I of Moscow without consulting the Khan.

== Issue ==
Dmitry married Eudoxia Dmitriyevna, daughter of Dmitry of Suzdal. They had at least 12 children:

- Daniil Dmitriyevich (c. 1370 – 15 September 1379);
- Vasily Dmitriyevich (30 September 1371 – 27 February 1425), grand prince of Moscow;
- Sofia Dmitriyevna (d. 1427), married Fyodor Olgovich of Ryazan;
- Yury Dmitriyevich (26 November 1374 – 5 June 1434), prince of Zvenigorod and Galich;
- Maria Dmitriyevna (d. 15 May 1399), married Lengvenis;
- Anastasia Dmitriyevna, married Ivan Vsevolodovich of Kholm;
- Simeon Dmitriyevich (d. 11 September 1379);
- Ivan Dmitriyevich (1380 – 29 July 1393);
- Andrey Dmitriyevich (14 August 1382 – 9 July 1432), prince of Mozhaysk;
- Pyotr Dmitriyevich (29 July 1385 – 10 August 1428), prince of Dmitrov;
- Anna Dmitriyevna (b. 8 January 1387), married Yury Patrikiyevich;
- Konstantin Dmitriyevich (14 May 1389 – 1433), prince of Uglich and Pskov.

== Veneration ==
Demetrius Ioannovich Donskoy
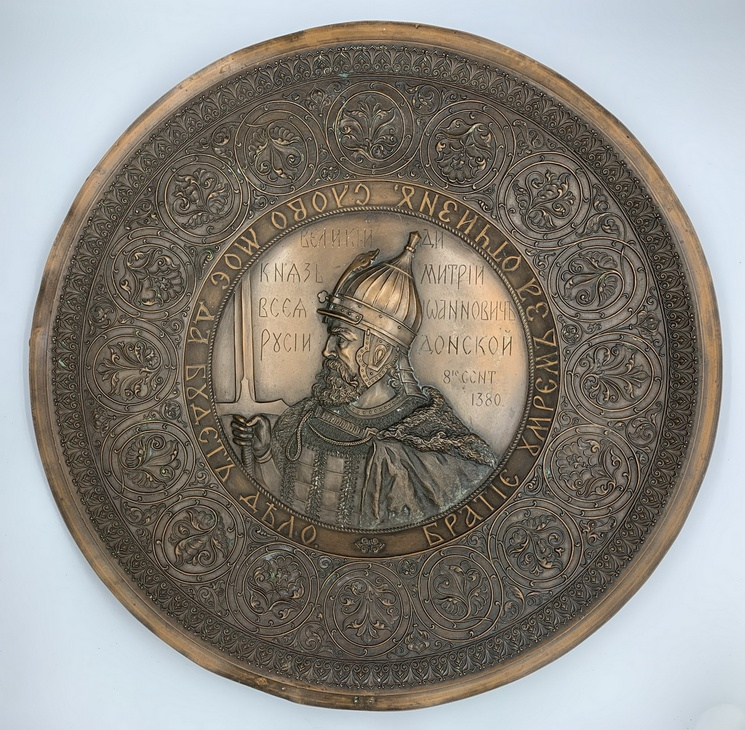

Right-Believing Prince
- Honored in: Eastern Orthodox Church
- Canonized: 6 June 1988, Trinity Lavra of St. Sergius by 1988 Local Council of the Russian Orthodox Church
- Major shrine: Cathedral of the Archangel
- Feast: 19 May
- Attributes: Sword and helmet
- Patronage: Military Police of Russia

Right-Believing Prince Demetrius Ioannovich Donskoy was canonized as a saint on 6 June 1988 in the Trinity Lavra of St. Sergius at the 1988 Local Council of the Russian Orthodox Church under Patriarch Pimen I of Moscow. His feast day is on 19 May; he is also commemorated on 6 July in the Synaxis of the Saints of Radonezh and on 22 September in the Synaxis of the Saints of Tula.

A bone fragment, allegedly from the sword hand of Donskoy, was abstracted from the burial place of Donsky during renovation of the Cathedral of the Archangel, inside the Kremlin.

== Gallery ==
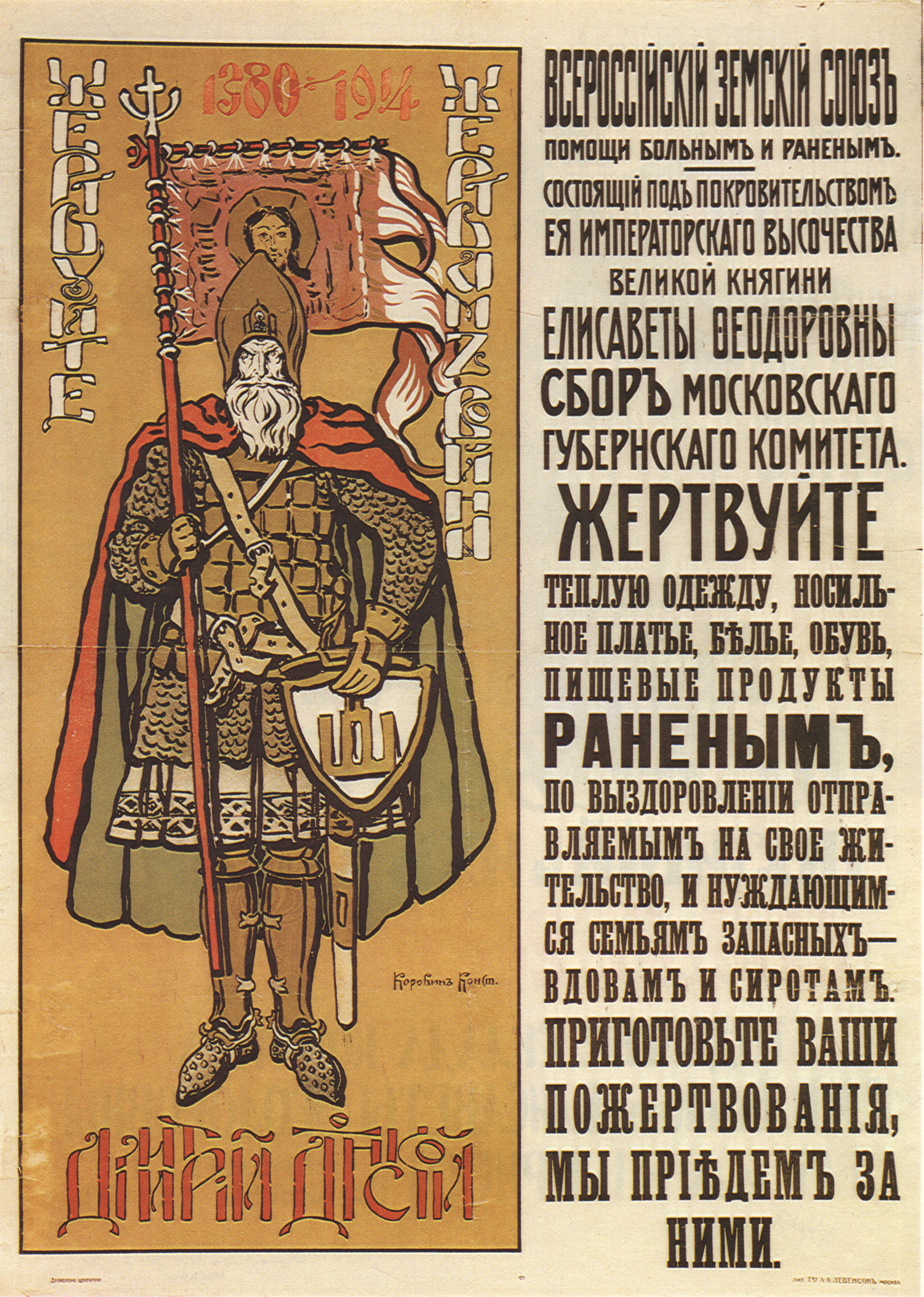
Dmitry Donskoy in a World War I patriotic poster by Konstantin Korovin

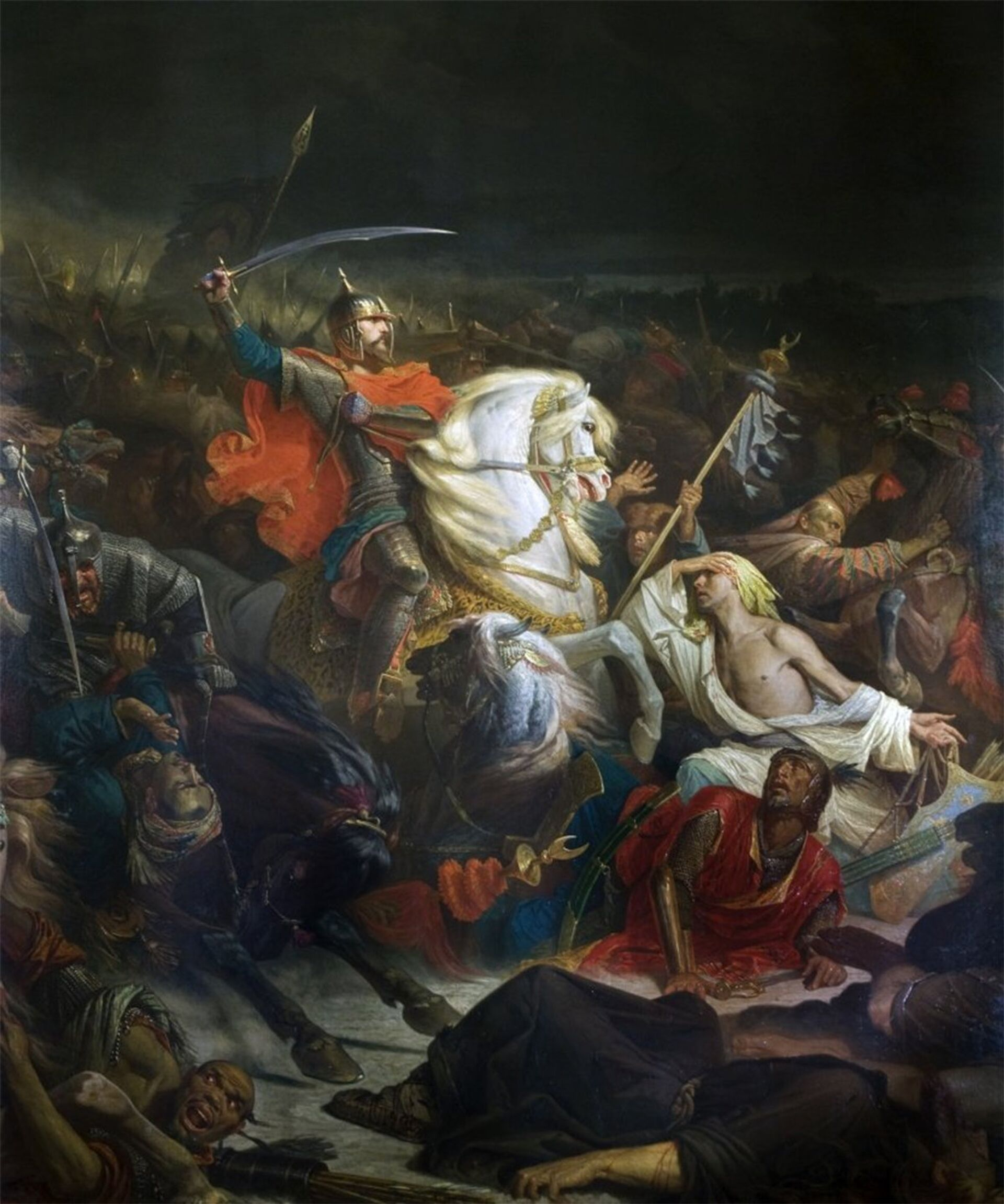
Dmitriy Donskoy in the Battle of Kulikovo, by Adolphe Yvon

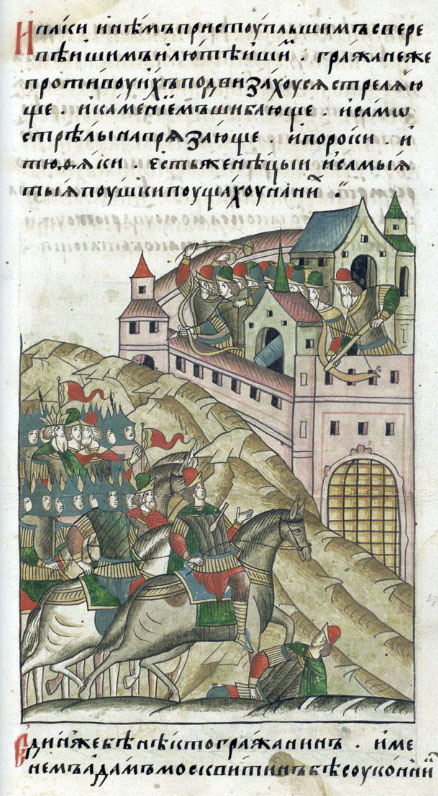
Defense of Moscow from Tokhtamysh in 1382

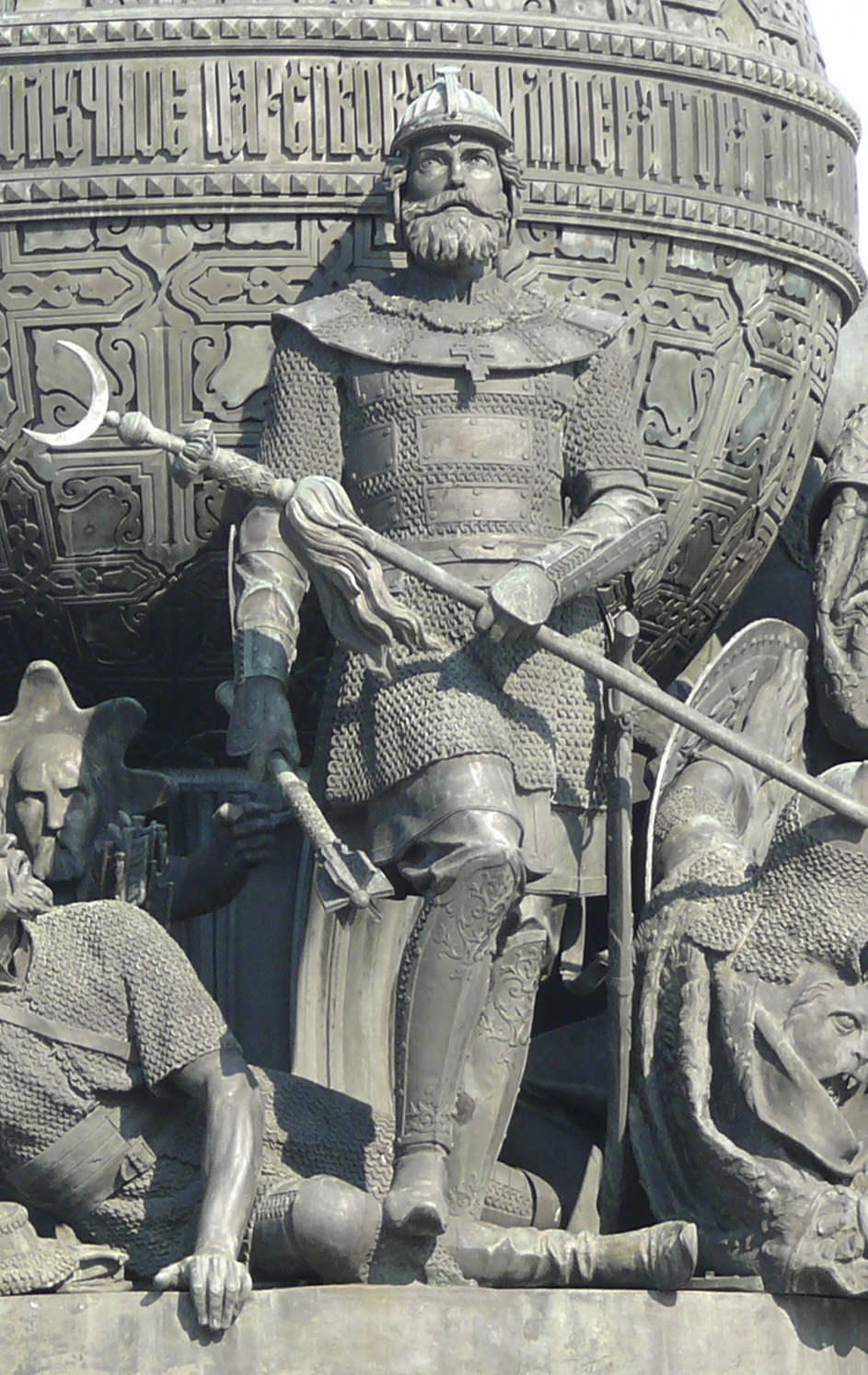
Dmitriy Donskoy on the Millennium of Russia monument in Veliky Novgorod

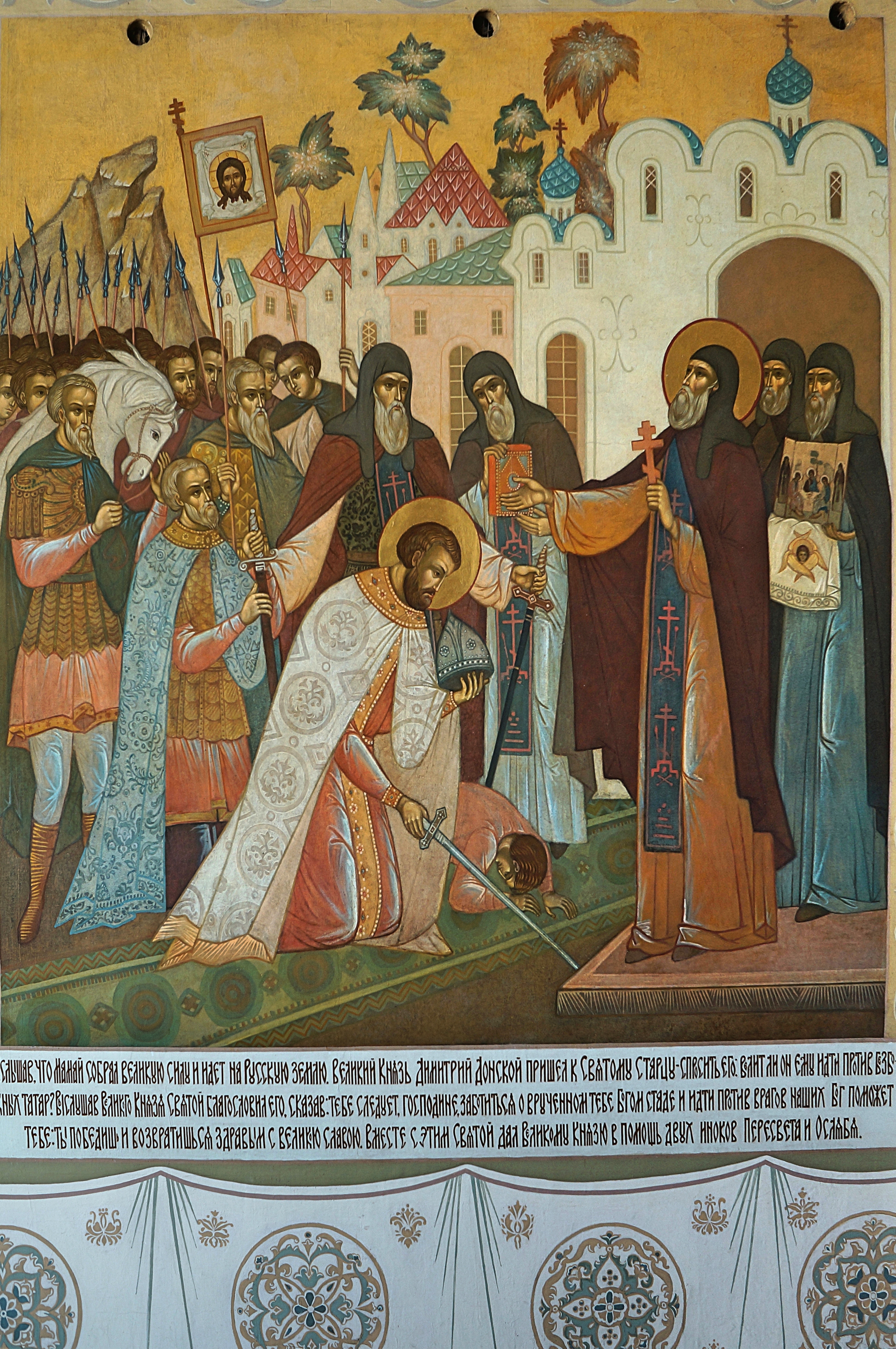
Fresco of the blessing of Prince Dimitry Donskoy by Saint Sergius of Radonezh (Artel of Andrei Rublev), Trinity-Sergius Lavra, Sergiev Posad Oblast, Moscow

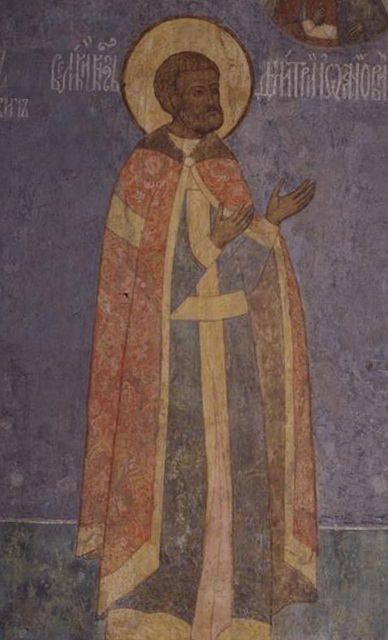
Fresco of Saint Dmitry Donskoy in the Cathedral of the Archangel in Moscow (1652–1666)

== See also ==
- Bibliography of Russian history (1223–1613)
- Family tree of Russian monarchs
- Dmitry Donskoy, opera by Anton Rubinstein (1852).
- Dmitri Donskoi (ship)

== Sources ==
- Crummey, Robert O. (6 June 2014) [1987]. The Formation of Muscovy 1300–1613. Routledge. ISBN 978-1-317-87200-9.
- Fennell, John L. I. (14 January 2014) [1995]. A History of the Russian Church to 1488. Routledge. ISBN 978-1-317-89720-0.
- Kuchkin, V. A. (2007). "Дмитрий Иванович Донской". Большая российская энциклопедия. Том 9: Динамика атмосферы — Железнодорожный узел (in Russian). Большая российская энциклопедия. pp. 129–130. ISBN 978-5-85270-339-2. Archived from the original on 17 November 2025.
- Kvlividze, N. V. (2007). "Димитрий Иоаннович". Православная энциклопедия. Т. XV: Димитрий — Дополнения к 'Актам Историческим' (in Russian). Moscow: Православная энциклопедия. pp. 116–132. ISBN 978-5-89572-026-4.

Regnal titles
Preceded by Dmitry of Suzdal	Grand Prince of Vladimir; 1362–1389	Succeeded by Vasily I
Preceded by Ivan II	Prince of Moscow; 1359–1389	Succeeded by Vasily I
