= Kazan rebellion =

War between the Tsardom of Russia and Kazans

- Part of Russo-Kazan Wars
Date	1552–1556
Location	Former Kazan Khanate, Russia
Result	Russian victory: Uprising quelled

Belligerents
Muscovite Russia; Hill Cheremisa	People of Kazan; Chyuvasha; Meadow Cheremisa; Hill Cheremisa; Ar people Nogai Horde

Commanders and leaders
Alexander Gorbatyi-Shuisky; Andrey Kurbsky; B. Saltykov	Mameshbirde (surrendered); Ali Akram †; Ayet Usayen; Tuaqmish Shahzada; Sarı Batır; Kebenke Morza; Qulay Morza

Casualties and losses
Unknown dead Unknown wounded	

The Kazan rebellion or Tatar Rebellion (1552–1556) was an uprising against Tsardom of Russia. It aimed to restore the Kazan Khanate, which the Russians had conquered in October 1552.

The rebel armies mostly consisted of Tatars, Chuvash, Cheremisses, Mordvins, and Udmurts. Some Nogais were also involved in the war. Independent rebel governments formed among the Chalem and in Mishatamaq. The khan of the Nogai Horde, Ğäli Äkräm, was invited to head the renewed khanate because Mameshbirde, leader of the rebellion, was not a descendant of Genghis Khan. Russian troops under Andrey Kurbsky and Alexander Gorbatyi-Shuisky opposed the "rebels".

At the peak of the rebellion, Tatars controlled the greater part of the former khanate. However, the city of Kazan, the former capital, remained under Russian control. Ivan IV sent major reinforcements to the Kazan area and suppressed the uprising. Part of the Russo-Kazan Wars.
