= Siege of Kazan =

1552 final battle of the Russo-Kazan Wars

- Part of Russo-Kazan Wars
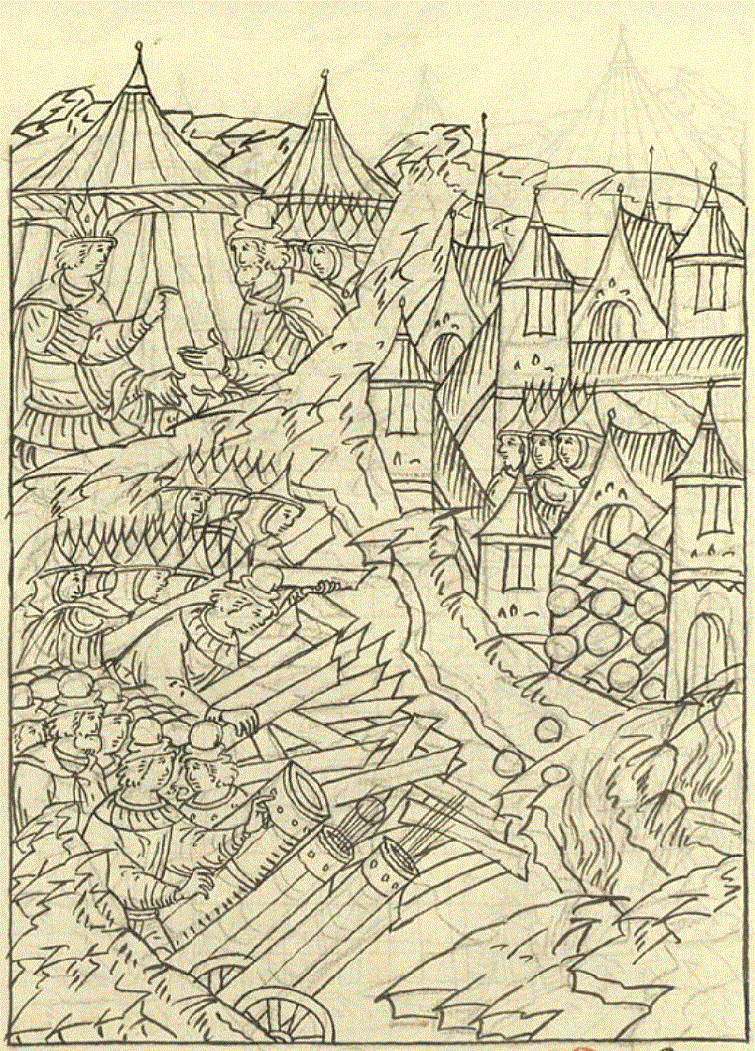
- Illustration in chronicle
| Date | September 2 – October 13, 1552 (1 month, 1 week and 4 days) |
| Location | Kazan, Khanate of Kazan (Current day Russia) |
| Result | Russian victory |
| Territorial changes | Destruction of the Khanate of Kazan |

Belligerents
| Tsardom of Russia; Qasim Khanate | Khanate of Kazan |

Commanders and leaders
| Tsar Ivan IV; A. Gorbatyi-Shuisky; Andrey Kurbsky; Mikhail Vorotynsky; Shahghali | Yadegar Moxammat (POW); Yapancha Bak †; Zaynash Morza (POW); Qolsharif † |

Units involved
| Streltsy; Muscovy and Qasim irregular feudal cavalry Russian artillery and sappers | Kazan garrison Kazan irregular feudal cavalry Kazan civilians Cheremis infantry units Nogay cavalry units Kazan artillery |

Strength
| 150,000 men, 150 cannons Unknown battleships Several siege towers | 50,000 men, including civilians^{a} Unknown cannons |

Casualties and losses
| 15,355^{a} Unknown wounded | Around 65,000 dead or missing (including civilians)^{a} Other estimate: 20,000 dead More than 190,000 captured^{a} Many thousands displaced |
- ^{a} Kazan Chronicle; it is likely that this source underestimates Russian and overstates Tatar casualties

The siege of Kazan or Fall of Kazan in 1552 was the final battle of the Russo-Kazan Wars and led to the fall of the Khanate of Kazan. Conflict continued after the fall of Kazan, however, as rebel governments formed in Çalım and Mişätamaq, and a new khan was invited from the Nogais. This guerrilla war lingered until 1556.

== Background ==
During the existence of the khanate (1438–1552) Russian forces besieged Kazan at least ten times (1469, 1478, 1487, 1506, 1524, 1530, 1545, 1547, 1549–1550, 1552). In 1547 and in 1549–1550, Ivan the Terrible besieged Kazan, but supply difficulties forced him to withdraw. The Russians pulled back 29 kilometres (18 mi) and built the town or fort of Sviyazhsk. They also annexed land west of the Volga which weakened the khanate. The peace party agreed to accept the pro-Russian Shah-Ali as khan. The patriotic party regained power, Shah Ali fled and Yadegar Mokhammad of Kazan was called in as khan. Religious leaders like Qolsharif inspired the people to a determined resistance.

== Siege ==
The Russian forces included streltsy as well as Moscow and Qasim irregular feudal cavalry, but the Muscovite artillery and sappers, both Russian and foreigners, played a vital role. At first they faced the Tatar garrison of Kazan, 10,000 Nogai horsemen led by the khan of Kazan, Yadegar Mokhammad, who originated from the Nogai Horde. Cheremiss units and Kazan irregular feudal cavalry had bases in forests north and east of Kazan respectively, with the stronghold of Archa as their base. Before the battle Russians had a fortress on the Volga, Ivangorod, later known as Sviyazhsk, some kilometres above Kazan. The Russian military engineer Ivan Vyrodkov had built this wooden fortress in 1551, when after the conclusion of peace, the right bank of the Khanate (Taw yağı) had passed to Russia. It would serve as a strong point for the capture of Kazan by the Muscovite army.

The 150,000 strong Muscovite army under Ivan the Terrible came under Kazan's walls and laid siege to the city on August 22, 1552 (Old Style). Russian cannons shelled the walls from 29 August. Soon they smothered the fire of large-calibre Tatar cannons. During the period from 30 August to 6 September Alexander Gorbatyi-Shuisky defeated the inner cavalry under Yapancha and the Ar units and burned Archa. Andrey Kurbsky defeated Cheremis troops. Sappers blew up the underground way to Kazan's underground drinking-water source.

Ivan Vyrodkov built on site a 12-metre-high wooden siege tower (also called a "battery-tower", to distinguish it from pre-gunpowder siege engines) to mount siege cannon. This revolutionary new design could hold ten large-calibre cannon and 50 lighter cannon, allowing a concentration of artillery fire on a section of the earthen-filled wooden wall of the city; this played a crucial role in shattering Tatar resistance. However, the few cannon defending Kazan had first to be put out of action for the tower to be effective, as it would otherwise have become an obvious target for the remaining Tatar artillery.

On 2 October, sappers (believed to have been led by the Englishman Butler, also known as Rozmysl in Russian chronicles) blew up the wall near the Nogai and Atalıq Gates. Russian soldiers entered the city; the civil population as well as the army of Kazan opposed them. After desperate street fighting, some survivors were blockaded in the citadel. Then, after the capture of khan Yadegar Moxammad and of Nogai leader Zaynash, the defenders of the citadel tried to escape to the northern forests, but they were defeated. A number of Russians who had been captured in military campaigns from the Russian borderland and held captive in the Khanate were released, and a large massacre of Kazan Tatars took place, as well as the destruction of almost all Tatar buildings, including mosques.

Before the siege, Ivan IV encouraged his army with examples of Queen Tamar of Georgia's battles, describing her as: "The most wise Queen of Iberia, endowed with the intelligence and courage of a man".

== Aftermath ==
18,000 men were left as a garrison and Ivan returned to Moscow to celebrate. After the fall of Kazan, resistance continued in the countryside. The tribes refused to pay taxes. Russian merchants were killed, which led to reprisals. The forts of Çalım and Mişätamaq were built on the west and east sides of the Volga. The Nogai Ali Akram was brought in as khan. Soltikov marched against Mişätamaq but he and 500 men were surrounded in the snow and killed. Ivan sent a larger force. There was daily fighting in the snow and forests. Ten thousand men were killed, six thousand were captured along with fifteen thousand women and children. 1,600 leading Tatars were put to death. The leaders Yepancha and Aleka were killed. Ali Akram proved incompetent and was killed by Mameshbirde. Mameshbirde was betrayed to the Russians. The fort of Mişätamaq fell at some point. After the fall of Çalım in 1556 most resistance came to an end.

In 1556 the Russians went down the Volga and conquered the Khanate of Astrakhan. In 1558 Anikey Stroganov was granted large lands on the Kama River northeast of Kazan, which he worked to develop. In 1582 the Stroganovs were involved in the conquest of the Khanate of Sibir east of the Urals. The Kazan Tatars continued to live in the area and retained their language and religion.

The tsarist administration prohibited the Tatars, Chuvash and Mari from settling along rivers and in cities, and also from engaging in blacksmith and jewelry crafts.[1] Settlements in the specified zone were destroyed or relocated. [2]

After his conquest of Kazan, Ivan IV is said to have ordered the crescent, a symbol of Islam, to be placed underneath the Christian cross on the domes of Orthodox Christian churches.

== Commemoration ==
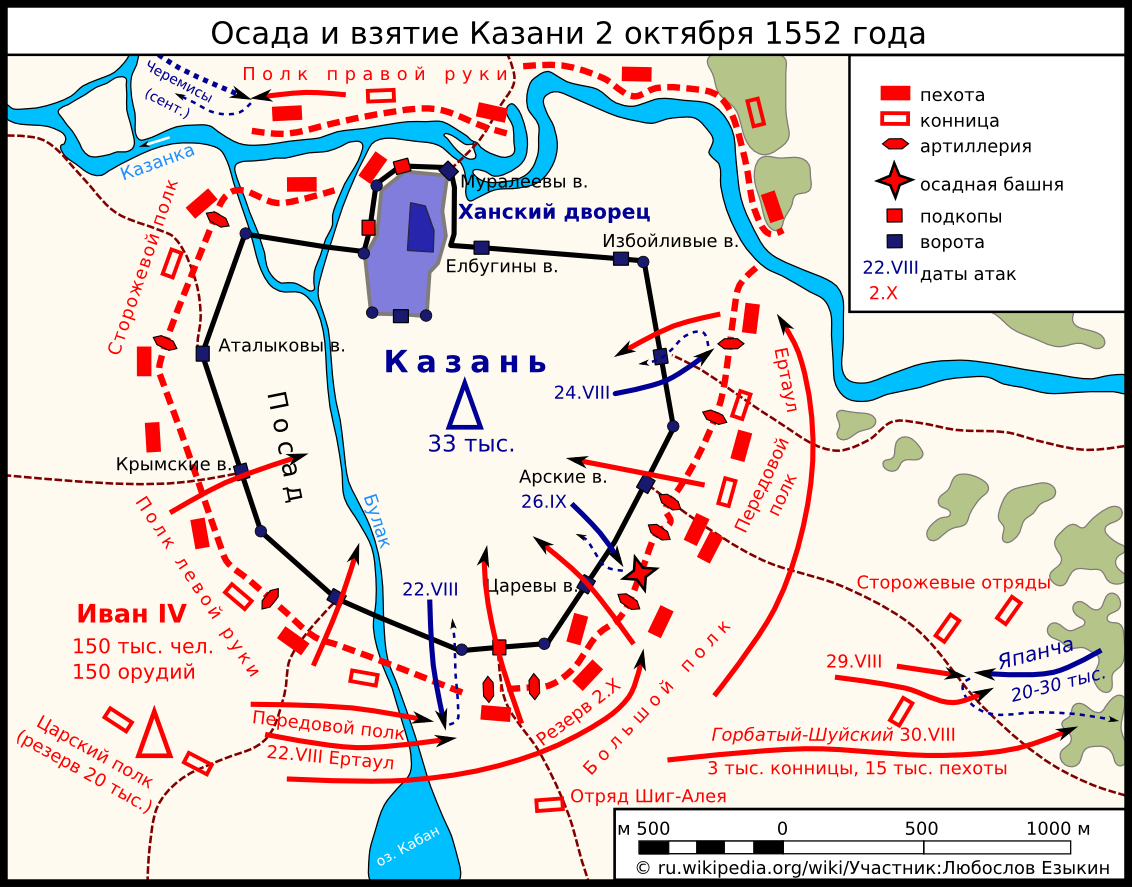
Siege of Kazan

In Tatarstan, a Memorial Day (Xäter Köne) is held each October to commemorate the fall of Kazan. In 2021 it was banned by the Russian government.

- Mikhail Kheraskov recounted the capture of Kazan in his epic poem, the Rossiada (1771-1779).
- Saint Basil's Cathedral in Moscow commemorates the conquest of Kazan.

== Gallery ==
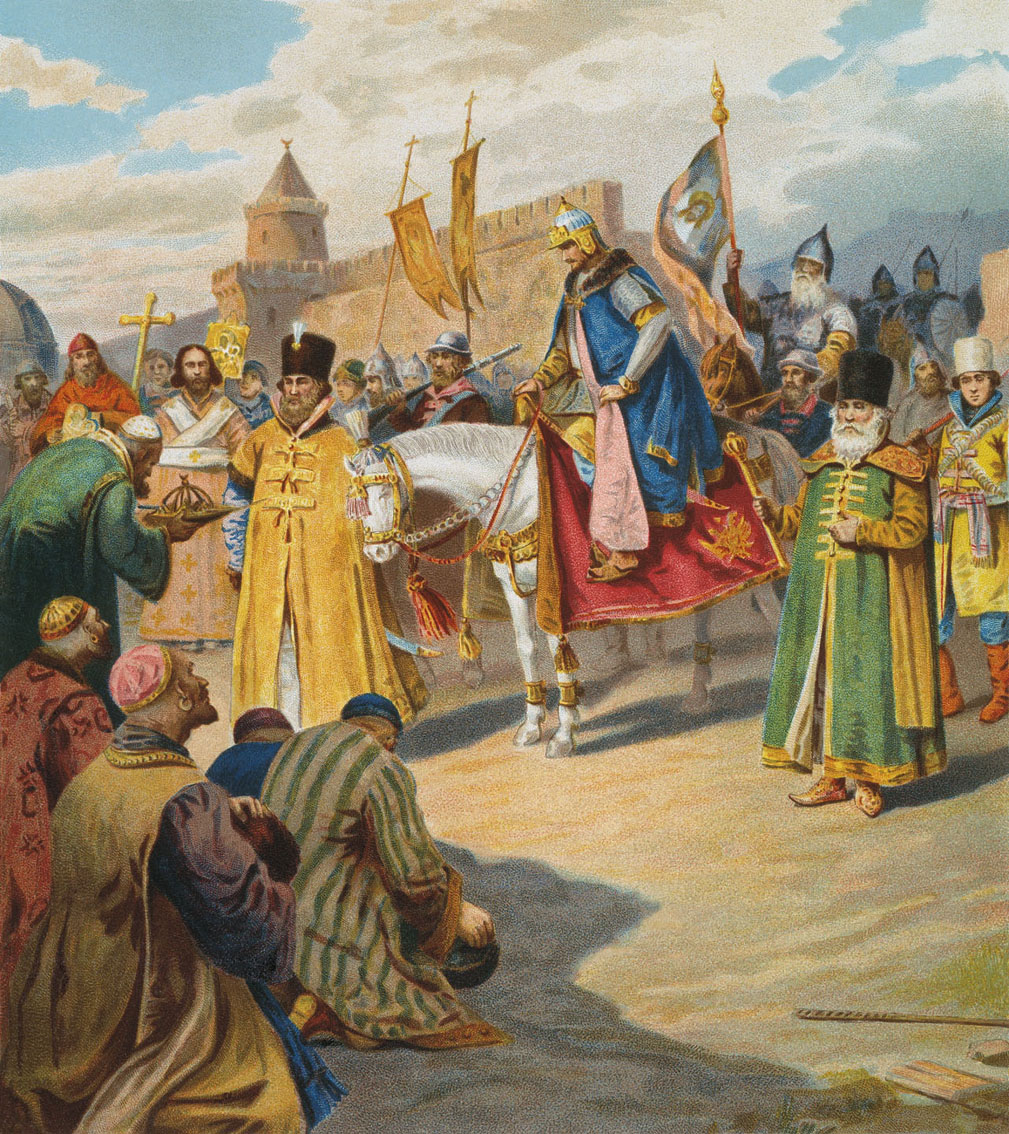
Ivan IV under the walls of Kazan

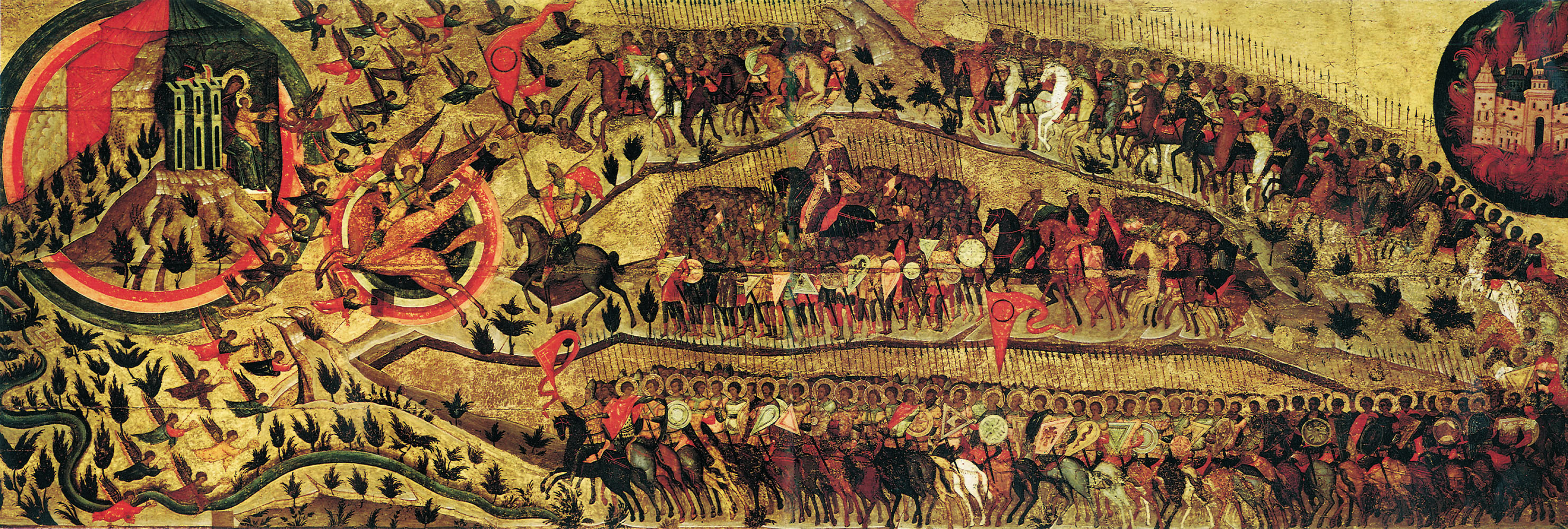
Blessed Be the Host of the Heavenly Tsar (alternatively known as Church Militant). Russian icon, ca. 1550–1560. This icon is traditionally perceived as an allegorical representation of the fall of Kazan.

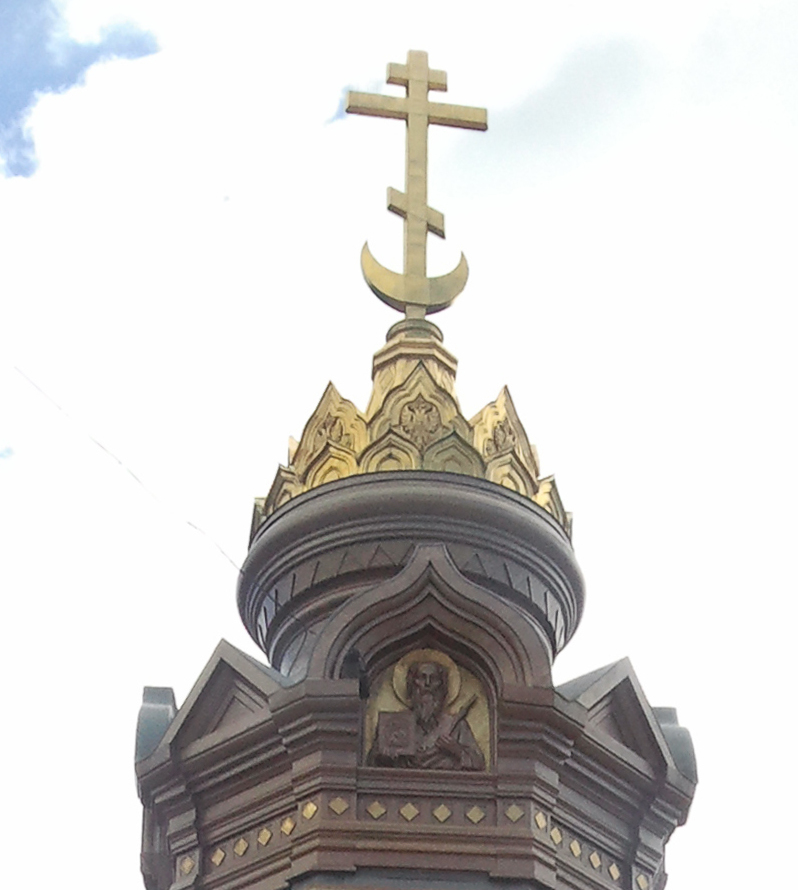
Cross over Crescent variation of the Christian cross, which was devised by Ivan IV after conquering Kazan.

== See also ==
- Islam in Tatarstan

== References and notes ==
- Henry Hoyle Howorth, History of the Mongols, 1880, Part 2, pp 412–429
