= Mameshbirde =

Mameshbirde (Mari: Мамич Бердей, Tatar: Мәмешбирде, romanized: Mämeşbirde, Tatar: Мамышбирде, romanized: Mamışbirde, Russian: Мамич-Берде́й) (died 1556) was a rebel commander during Kazan War for the independence of Kazan Khanate in 1552–1556. According to legend, he was a son of Mari noble and Chuvash noble woman.

In 1555, some years after the fall of Kazan, Mameshbirde gathered an army and started to struggle against Russian invaders on both banks of the Volga. At the Hill Bank Land of the Volga, his army reconstructed Çalım, the old stronghold at the Sender (Sundyr) Hill and based there. Mameshbirde tried to restore the khanate, but as he wasn't one of the Chinggisids, he needed someone to head the khanate. He invited the Nogay noble Ğäli Äkräm. After their joint armies were defeated by the Russian punitive expedition in 1556, he was captured. He was later executed in Moscow.
