= Kul Sharif Mosque =

Mosque in Kazan, Tatarstan, Russia

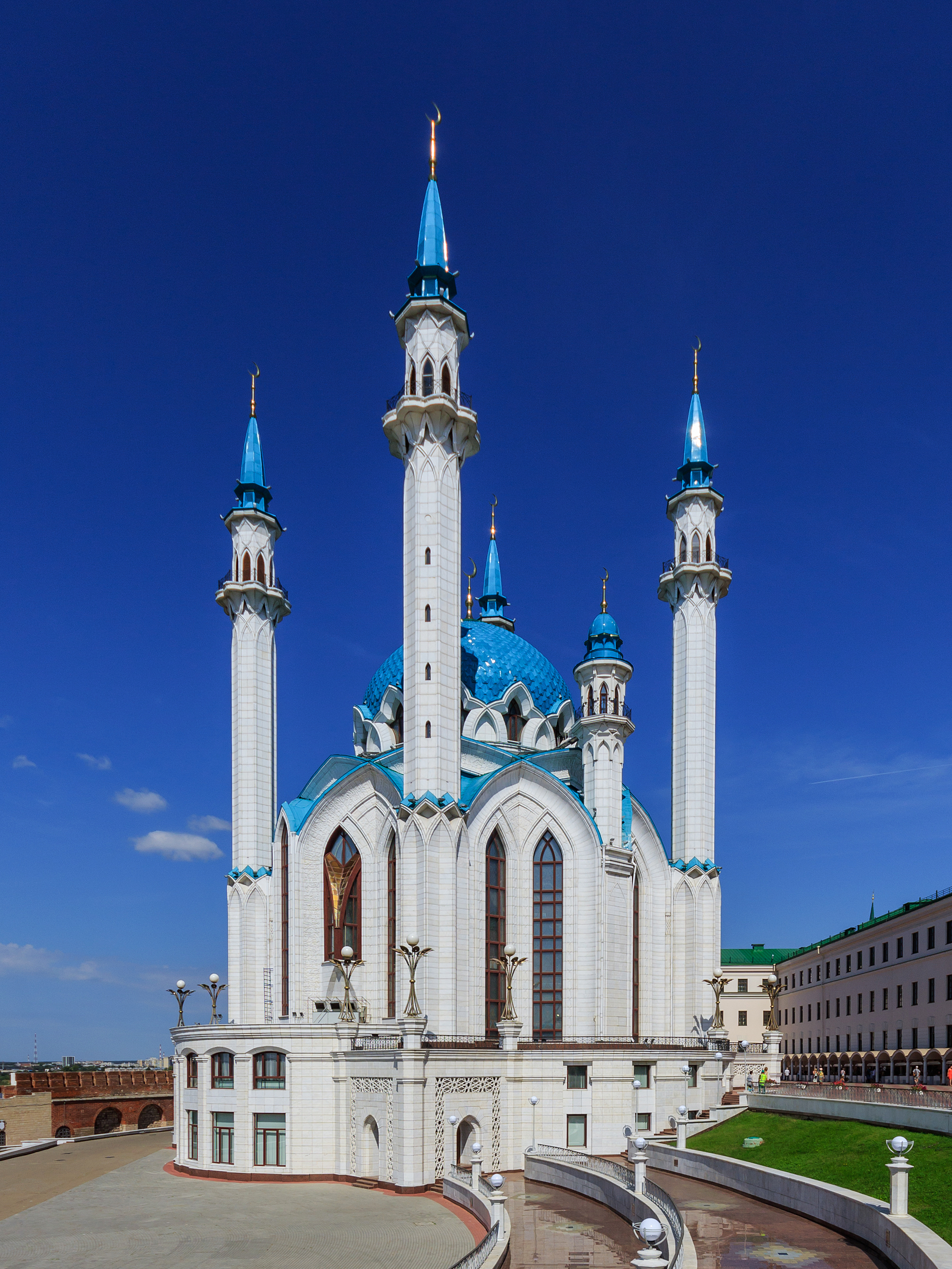

Religion
- Affiliation: Sunni Islam
- District: Tatarstan
- Status: Active

Location
- Location: Kazan, Russia
- Interactive map of Kul Sharif Mosque
- Coordinates: 55°47′54.49″N 49°06′17.32″E

Architecture
- Type: Mosque
- Style: Islamic architecture, Russian architecture
- Completed: c. 1552 CE (original structure); 2005 CE (current restoration)

Specifications
- Capacity: 6,000
- Dome: 1
- Minaret: 4

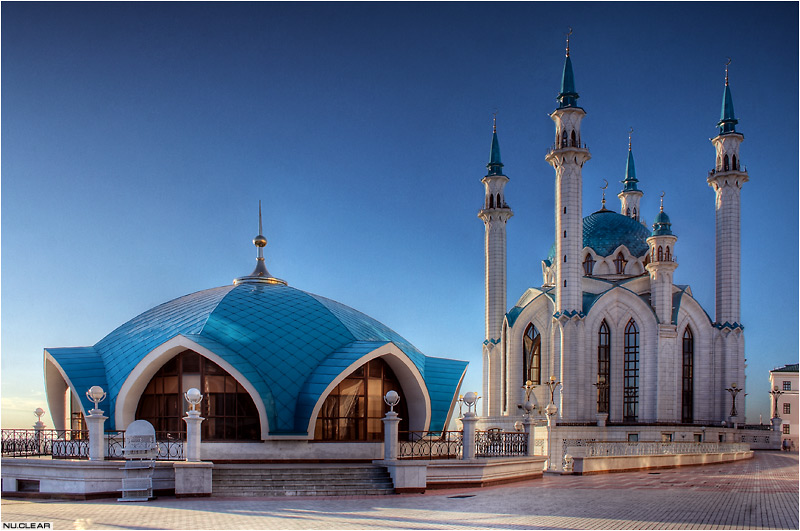

The Kul Sharif Mosque (Tatar: Кол Шәриф мәчете, romanized: Qol Şərif məçete; Russian: Мечеть Кул-Шариф, romanized: Mechet' Kul-Sharif) located in Kazan Kremlin, was reputed to be – at the time of its construction – one of the largest mosques in Russia, and in Europe outside of Istanbul.

== History ==
Originally, the mosque was built in the Kazan Kremlin in the 16th century. It was named after Kul Sharif, who was a religious scholar who served there. Kul Sharif died along with his numerous students while defending Kazan from Russian forces in 1552 during the Siege of Kazan, and the mosque was destroyed by Ivan the Terrible's forces. It is believed that the building featured minarets, both in the form of cupolas and tents. The current building is a replacement, constructed in the first years of the 21st century and completed in the year 2005.

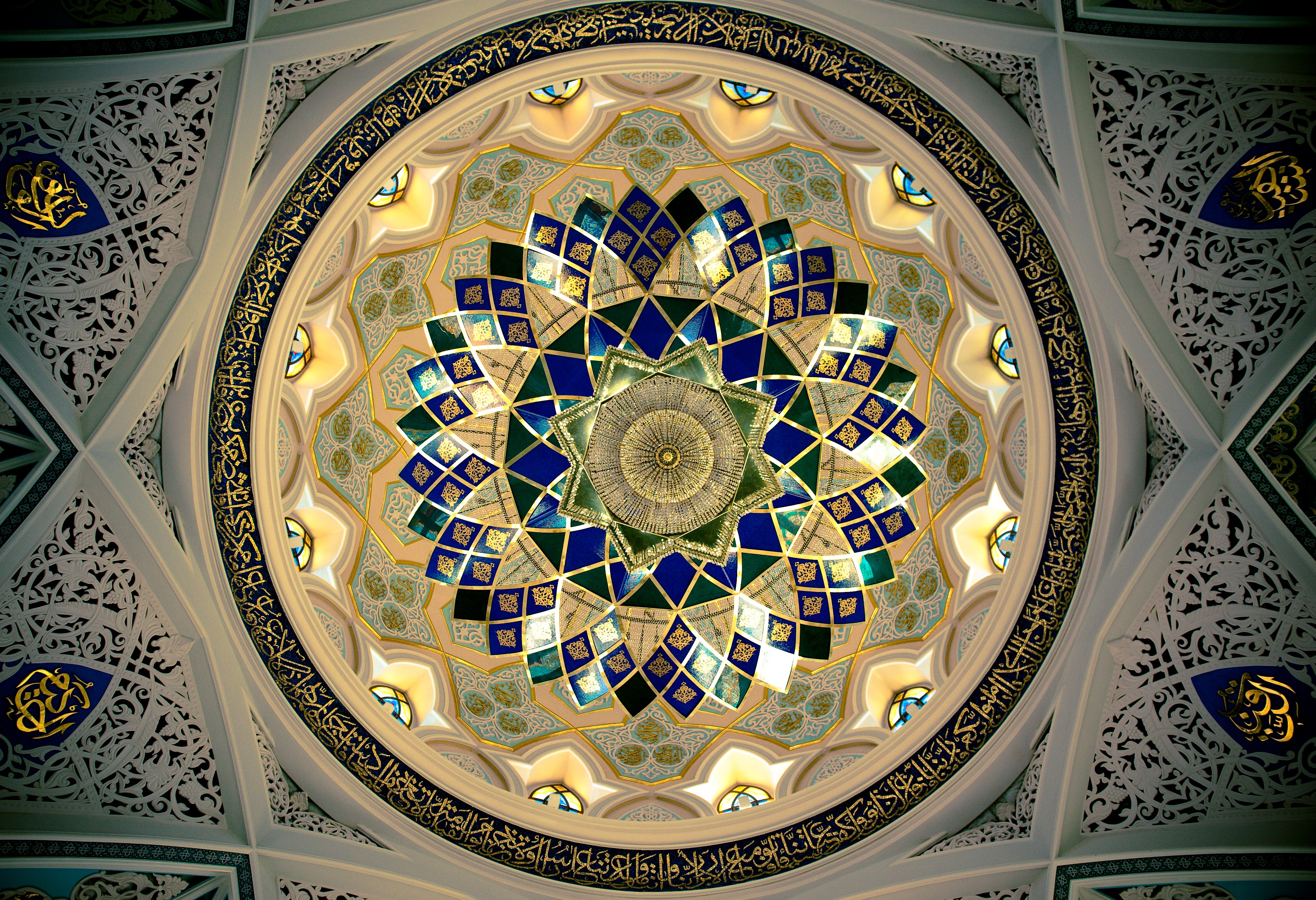
The mosque displays several detail through mosaics, ornaments, calligraphy, and more.

== See also ==
- Islam in Russia
- List of mosques in Russia
- List of mosques in Europe
