= Edward L. Keenan =

American historian (1935–2015)

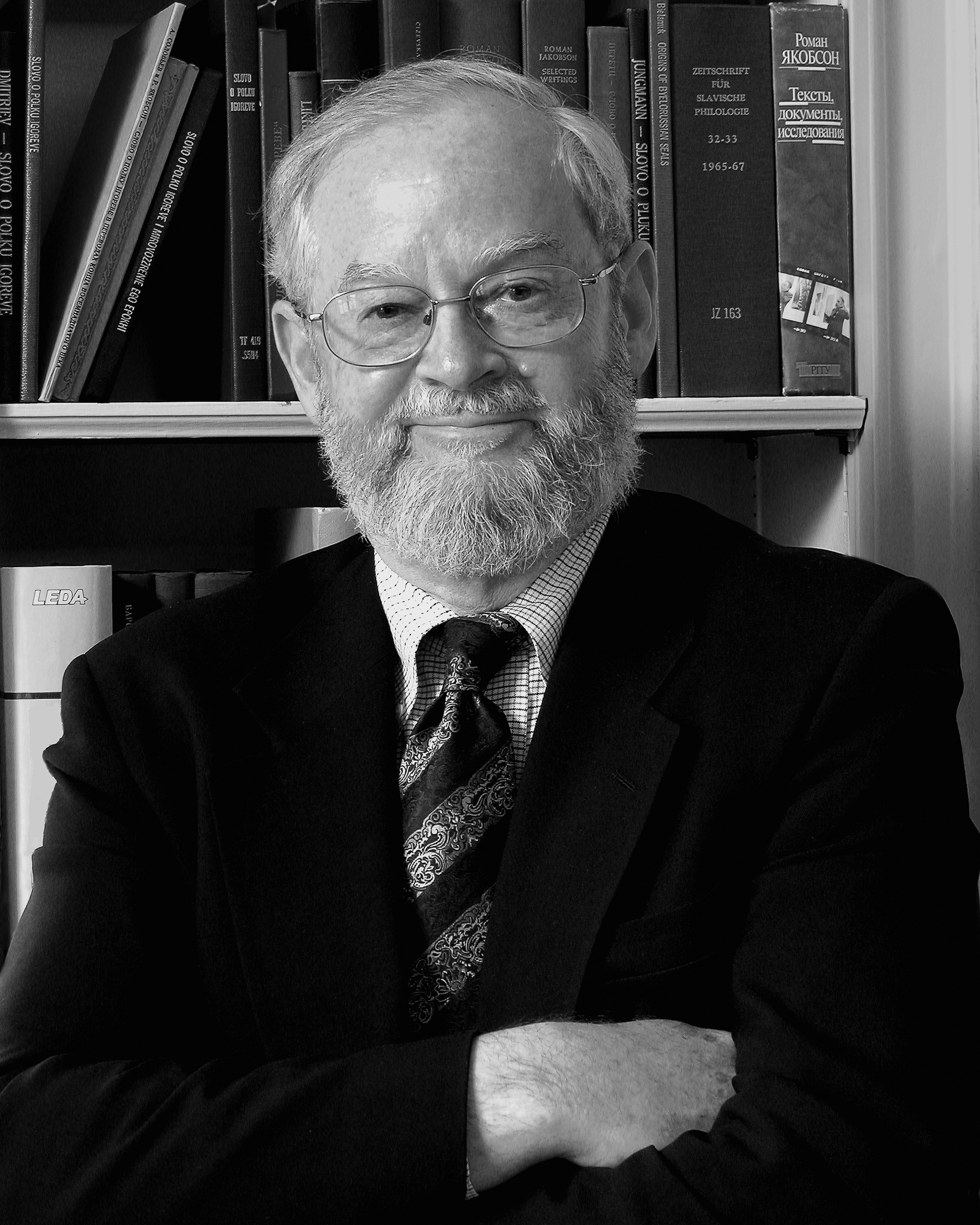
- Keenan in 1998
- Born: May 14, 1935; Buffalo, New York
- Died: March 9, 2015 (aged 79); Deer Isle, Maine

Academic background
- Education: Harvard University

Academic work
- Discipline: History
- Sub-discipline: Russian history
- Institutions: Harvard University; Dumbarton Oaks

Edward Louis "Ned" Keenan Jr. (May 14, 1935 – March 9, 2015) was an American professor of history at Harvard University who specialized in medieval Russian history (especially the cultural and the political history of Muscovy). He became a prominent and controversial figure after conducting various studies that analyzed and ultimately disproved the authenticity of major resources in East Slavic history. Two of his books argue that two texts were not medieval at all, but seventeenth- and eighteenth-century, respectively: The Kurbskii-Groznyi Apocrypha: The Seventeenth-century Genesis of the "Correspondence" Attributed to Prince A. M. Kurbskii and Tsar Ivan IV (1971), and Joseph Dobrovsky and the Origins of the "Igor Tale" (2003) He eventually became one of the world's leading experts on medieval Russian history. He also wrote a number of seminal articles.

== Early life and education ==
Keenan was born in Buffalo, New York. In the fall of 1953, he entered Harvard and proceeded to "essentially waste [his] freshman year". Eventually he decided to major in Russian, completing his A.B. degree in Slavic Languages and Literatures in 1957. He received his A.M. in Regional Studies in 1962, and his Ph.D. in History and Middle Eastern Studies in 1965.

== Career ==
Keenan served as an associate director (1973–1975) and then director (1976–1977) of Harvard's Russian Research Center. He was the dean of the Graduate School of Arts and Sciences (1978–84) and the director of the Center for Middle Eastern Studies over a considerable period (1981–1983, 1986–1987, 1993–1994). He also served as a director of the Dumbarton Oaks Research Library in Washington, D.C..

== Work ==
Keenan was skeptical of the authenticity of texts that were attributed to medieval Russia. Two of these supposedly medieval texts were used to characterize the relations between Muscovites and the Mongol steppe. These texts were the Iarlyk of Akhmed-khan to Ivan III and Kazanskaia istoriia (The History of Kazan). He was also skeptical of the authenticity of the correspondence between Tsar Ivan IV and Prince Andrei Kurbskii. The Kurbskii-Groznyi Apocrypha: The Seventeenth-century Genesis of the 'Correspondence' Attributed to Prince A. M. Kurbskii and Tsar Ivan IV claims these letters were forgeries. Also, in a more recent study, Joseph Dobrovsky and the Origins of the 'Igor Tale', Keenan argued the Igor Tale, traditionally thought to be from the twelfth century, was created in the eighteenth century by Bohemian linguist and scholar Josef Dobrovsky. This work has led to renewed interest and debate about the authenticity of the Igor Tale and has gained mixed reviews. Scholars who were critical of Keenan's views expressed their criticisms in articles, books, and reviews. Keenan was known for his witty and charismatic personality and was well versed in story-telling. He died in his home at Deer Isle, Maine, at the age of 79.

== Publications ==
- Josef Dobrovský and the Origins of the Igorʹ Tale (2004)
- The Kurbskii-Groznyi Apocrypha: the 17th-Century Genesis of the "Correspondence" Attributed to Prince A. M. Kurbskii and Tsar Ivan IV (1971)
