= Siege tower =

Mobile structure for attacking walls

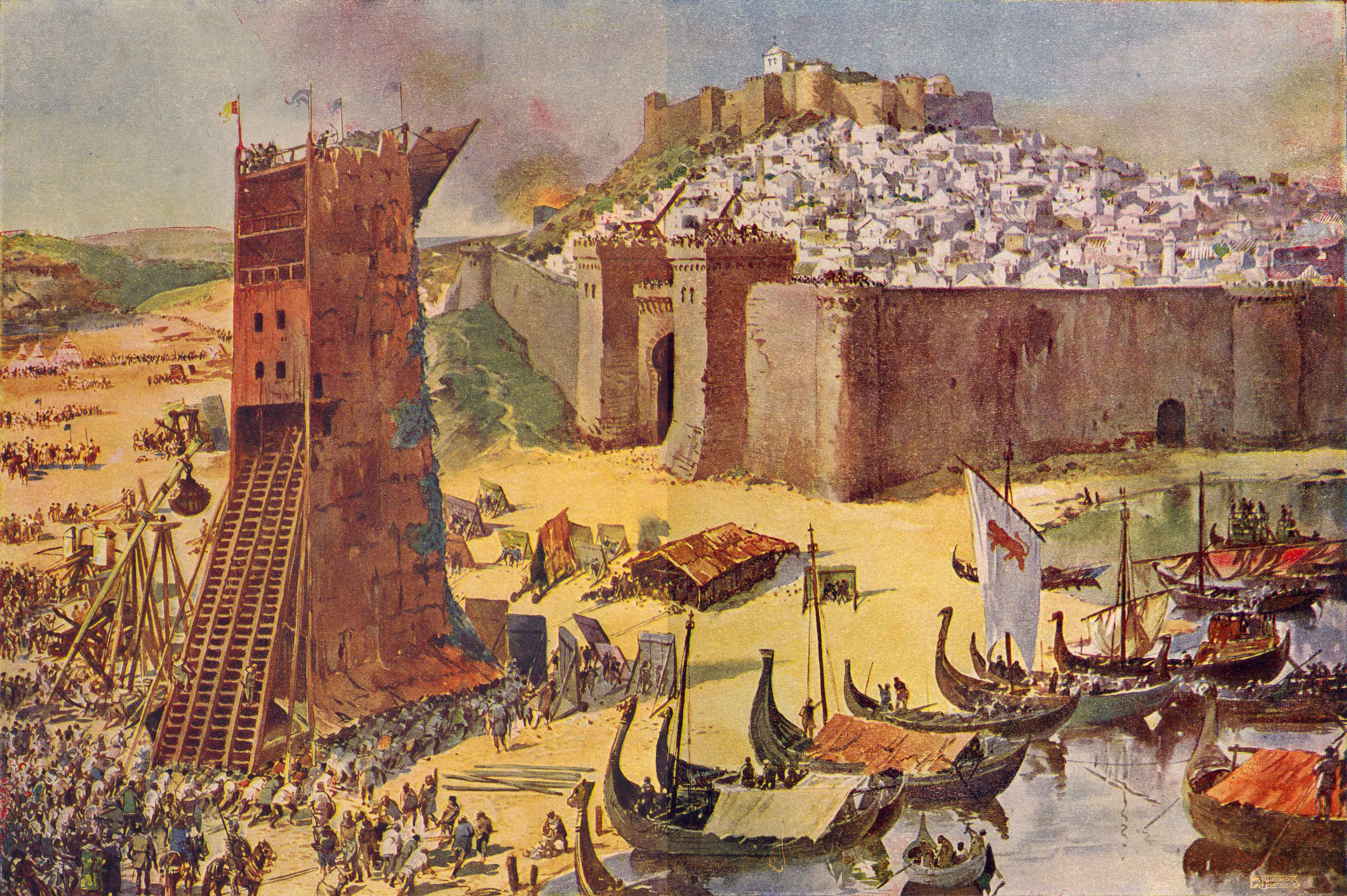
12th century siege of Lisbon with siege tower, trebuchets and mantlets.

A siege tower or breaching tower (or in the Middle Ages, a belfry) is a specialized siege engine, constructed to protect assailants and ladders while approaching the defensive walls of a fortification. The tower was often rectangular with four wheels with its height roughly equal to that of the wall or sometimes higher to allow archers or crossbowmen to stand on top of the tower and shoot arrows or quarrels into the fortification. While the towers were primarily constructed of wood and thus flammable, their builders typically incorporated whatever non-flammable coverings could be readily procured including iron and/or fresh animal skins.

Evidence for use of siege towers in Ancient Egypt, Ancient China and Anatolia dates to the Bronze Age. They were used extensively in warfare of the ancient Near East after the Late Bronze Age collapse, and in Egypt by Kushites from Sudan who founded the 25th dynasty. During classical antiquity they were common among Hellenistic Greek armies of the 4th century BC and later Roman armies of Europe and the Mediterranean, while also seeing use in ancient China during the Warring States Period and Han dynasty. Siege towers were of unwieldy dimensions and, like trebuchets, were therefore mostly constructed on site of the siege. Taking considerable time to construct, siege towers were mainly built if the defense of the opposing fortification could not be overcome by ladder assault ("escalade"), by mining, or by breaking walls or gates with tools such as battering rams.

The siege tower sometimes housed spearmen, pikemen, and swordsmen or archers and crossbowmen, who shot arrows and quarrels at the defenders. Because of the size of the tower it would often be the first target of large stone catapults, but it had its own projectiles with which to retaliate.

Siege towers were used to get troops over an enemy curtain wall. When a siege tower was near a wall, it would drop a gangplank between it and the wall. Troops could then rush onto the walls and into the castle or city. Some siege towers also had battering rams which they used to bash down the defensive walls around a city or a castle gate.

== Ancient use ==
In the First Intermediate Period tomb of General Intef at Thebes (modern Luxor, Egypt), a mobile siege tower is shown in the battle scenes. In modern Harpoot, Turkey, an artistically Akkadian style stone carved relief dated circa 2000 BC was found depicting a siege tower, the earliest known visual depiction from Anatolia (siege towers were later described in Hittite cuneiform writing).

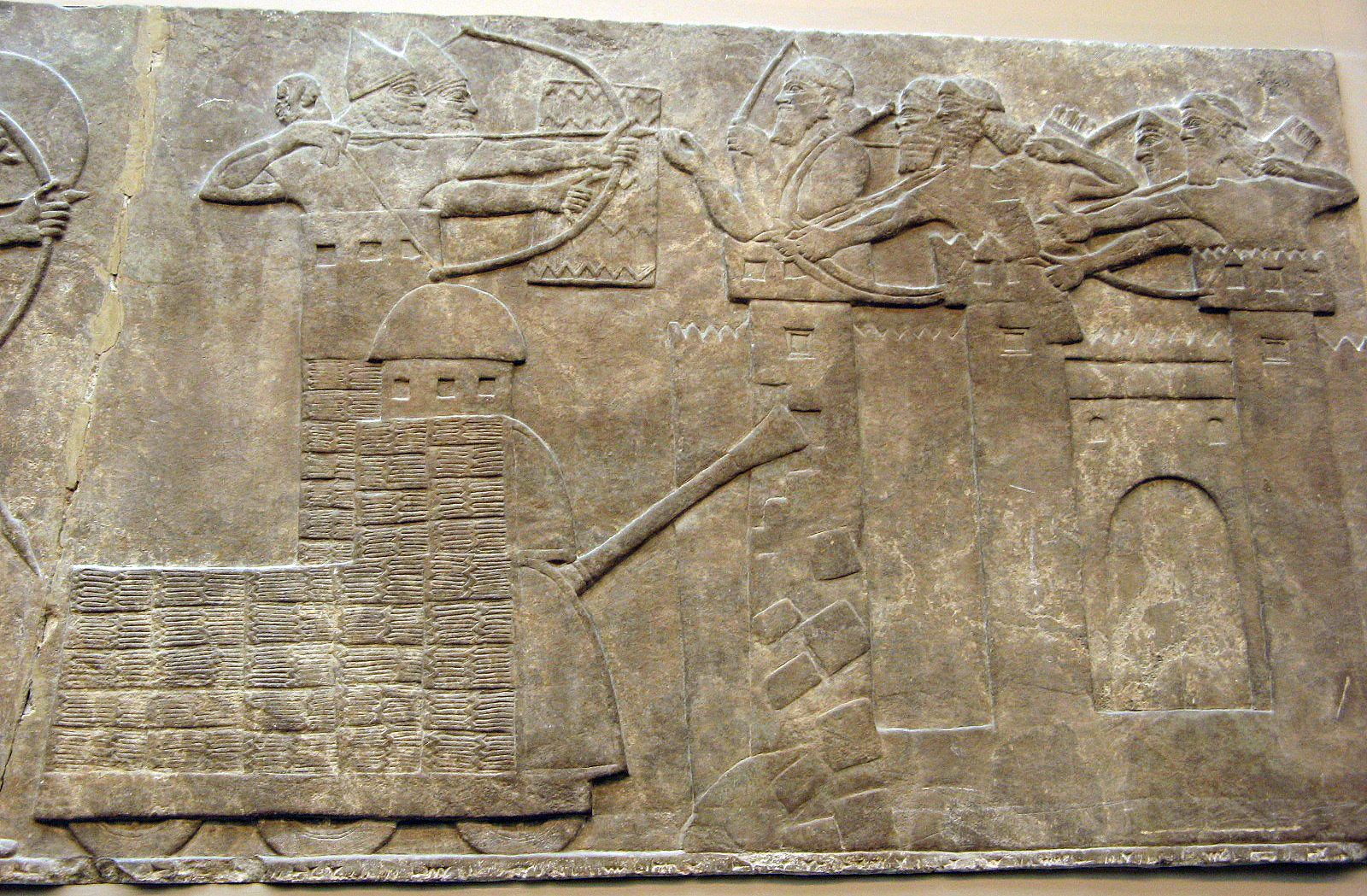
Assyrian attack on a town with archers and a wheeled battering ram; Neo-Assyrian relief, North-West Palace of Nimrud (room B, panel 18); 865–860 BC

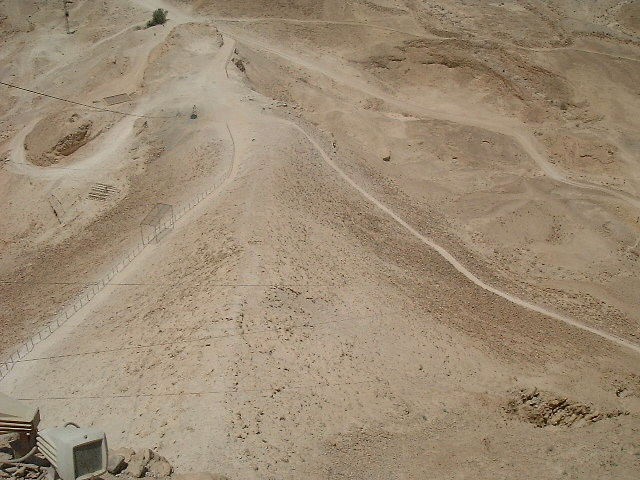
The remains of the Roman siege-ramp at Masada

Siege towers were used by the armies of the Neo-Assyrian Empire in the 9th century BC, under Ashurnasirpal II (r. 884 BC – 859 BC). Reliefs from his reign, and subsequent reigns, depict siege towers in use with a number of other siege works, including ramps and battering rams.

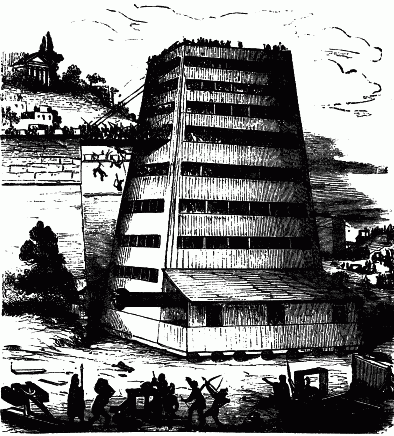
Roman siege tower

Centuries after they were employed in Assyria, the use of the siege tower spread throughout the Mediterranean. During the siege of Memphis in the 8th century BC, siege towers were built by Kush for the army led by Piye (founder of the Nubian 25th dynasty), in order to enhance the efficiency of Kushite archers and slingers. After leaving Thebes, Piye's first objective was besieging Ashmunein. He admonished his assembled army for their failures, and took personal command. He had a wooden siege tower erected from which his archers could overlook the city and fire down on the enemy.

During the siege of Syracuse in 413 BC, Athenians erected a siege tower on ship hull. Alexander did the same at Tyre (322 BC) as did Marcellus in Syracuse (214 BC). Towers were used against both land and naval targets. At the time of Julius Caesar, ship towers were built with a lighter, collapsible design that could be stowed flat on the deck when not in use, lowering the center of gravity.

The biggest siege towers of antiquity, such as the Hellenistic Greek Helepolis (meaning "The Taker of Cities" in Greek) of the siege of Rhodes in 305 BC by Demetrius I of Macedon, could be as high as 40 m (130 ft) and as wide as 20 m (66 ft). Such large engines would require a rack and pinion to be moved effectively. It was manned by 200 soldiers and was divided into nine stories; the different levels housed various types of catapults and ballistae. Subsequent siege towers down through the centuries often had similar engines.

However, large siege towers could be defeated by the defenders by flooding the ground in front of the wall, creating a moat that caused the tower to get bogged in the mud. The siege of Rhodes illustrates the important point that the larger siege towers needed level ground. Many castles and hill-top towns and forts were virtually invulnerable to siege tower attack simply due to topography. Smaller siege towers might be used on top of siege-mounds, made of earth, rubble and timber mounds in order to overtop a defensive wall. For example, the remains of such a siege-ramp at Masada, Israel built by the Romans during the siege of Masada (72–73 AD) have survived and can still be seen today.

On the other hand, almost all the largest cities were on large rivers, or the coast, and so did have part of their circuit wall vulnerable to these towers. Furthermore, the tower for such a target might be prefabricated elsewhere and brought dismantled to the target city by water. In some rare circumstances, such towers were mounted on ships to assault the coastal wall of a city: at the Roman siege of Cyzicus during the Third Mithridatic War, for example, towers were used in conjunction with more conventional siege weapons.

One of the oldest references to the mobile siege tower in Ancient China was a written dialogue primarily discussing naval warfare. In the Chinese Yuejueshu (Lost Records of the State of Yue) written by the later Han dynasty author Yuan Kang in the year 52 AD, Wu Zixu (526 BC – 484 BC) purportedly discussed different ship types with King Helü of Wu (r. 514 BC – 496 BC) while explaining military preparedness. Before labeling the types of warships used, Wu said:

Nowadays in training naval forces we use the tactics of land forces for the best effect. Thus great wing ships correspond to the army's heavy chariots, little wing ships to light chariots, stomach strikers to battering rams, castle ships to mobile assault towers, and bridge ships to light cavalry.

—

== Medieval and later use ==
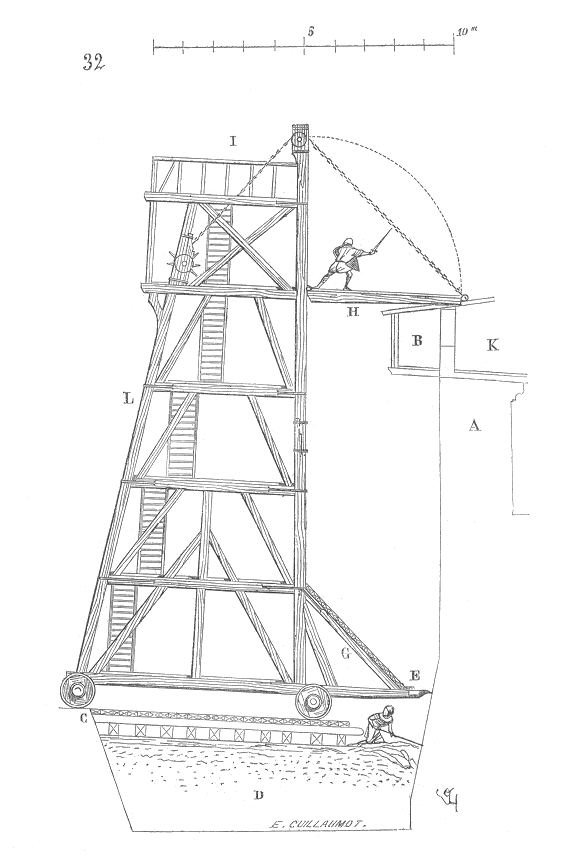
Sketch of a medieval siege tower

Chinese siege tower

With the collapse of the Western Roman Empire into independent states, and the Eastern Roman Empire on the defensive, the use of siege towers reached its height during the medieval period. Siege towers were used when the Avars laid siege unsuccessfully to Constantinople in 626, as the Chronicon Paschale recounts:

And in the section from the Polyandrion Gate as far as the Gate of St Romanus he prepared to station twelve lofty siege towers, which were advanced almost as far as the outworks, and he covered them with hides.

—

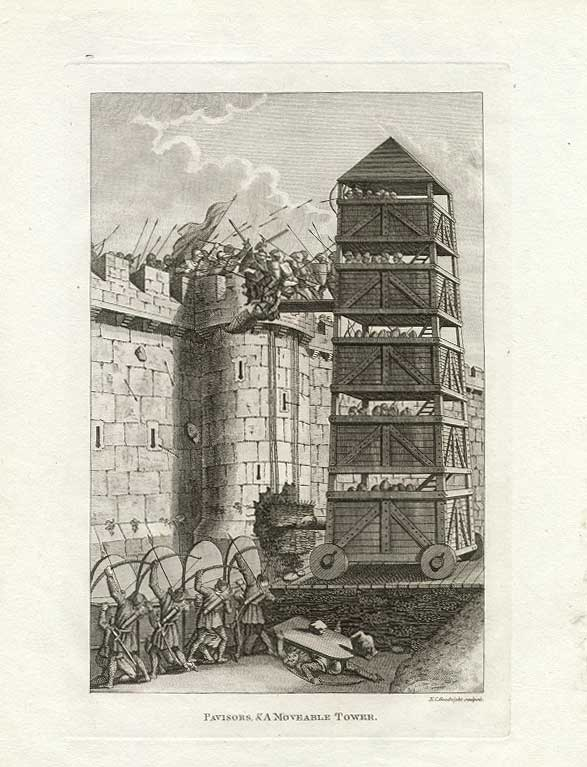
Medieval English siege tower

At this siege, the attackers also made use mobile armoured shelters known as sows or cats, which were used throughout the medieval period and allowed workers to fill in moats with protection from the defenders (thus levelling the ground for the siege towers to be moved to the walls). However, the construction of a sloping talus at the base of a castle wall (as was common in crusader fortification) could have reduced the effectiveness of this tactic to an extent.

Siege towers also became more elaborate during the medieval period; at the siege of Kenilworth in 1266, for example, 200 archers and 11 catapults operated from a single tower. Even then, the siege lasted almost a year, making it the longest siege in all of English history. They were not invulnerable either, as during the Fall of Constantinople in 1453, Ottoman siege towers were sprayed by the defenders with Greek fire.

Siege towers became vulnerable and obsolete with the development of large cannon. They had only ever existed to get assaulting troops over high walls and towers and large cannons also made high walls obsolete as fortification took a new direction. However, later constructions known as battery towers took on a similar role in the gunpowder age; like siege-towers, these were built out of wood on-site for mounting siege artillery. One of these was built by the Russian military engineer Ivan Vyrodkov during the siege of Kazan in 1552 (as part of the Russo-Kazan Wars), and could hold ten large-calibre cannon and fifty lighter cannons. Likely, it was a development of the gulyay-gorod (that is a mobile fortification assembled on wagons or sleds from prefabricated wall-sized shields with holes for cannons). Later battery towers were often used by the Ukrainian Cossacks.

During the Imjin War, the Japanese utilized siege towers to scale the walls of Jinju but were beaten back several times by Korean cannons. In the early 19th century, the Joseon Army utilized siege towers to lay siege to Jeonju where the last of Hong Gyeong-Rae's Rebellion made their stand but were beaten back several times by the rebels.

== Modern parallels ==
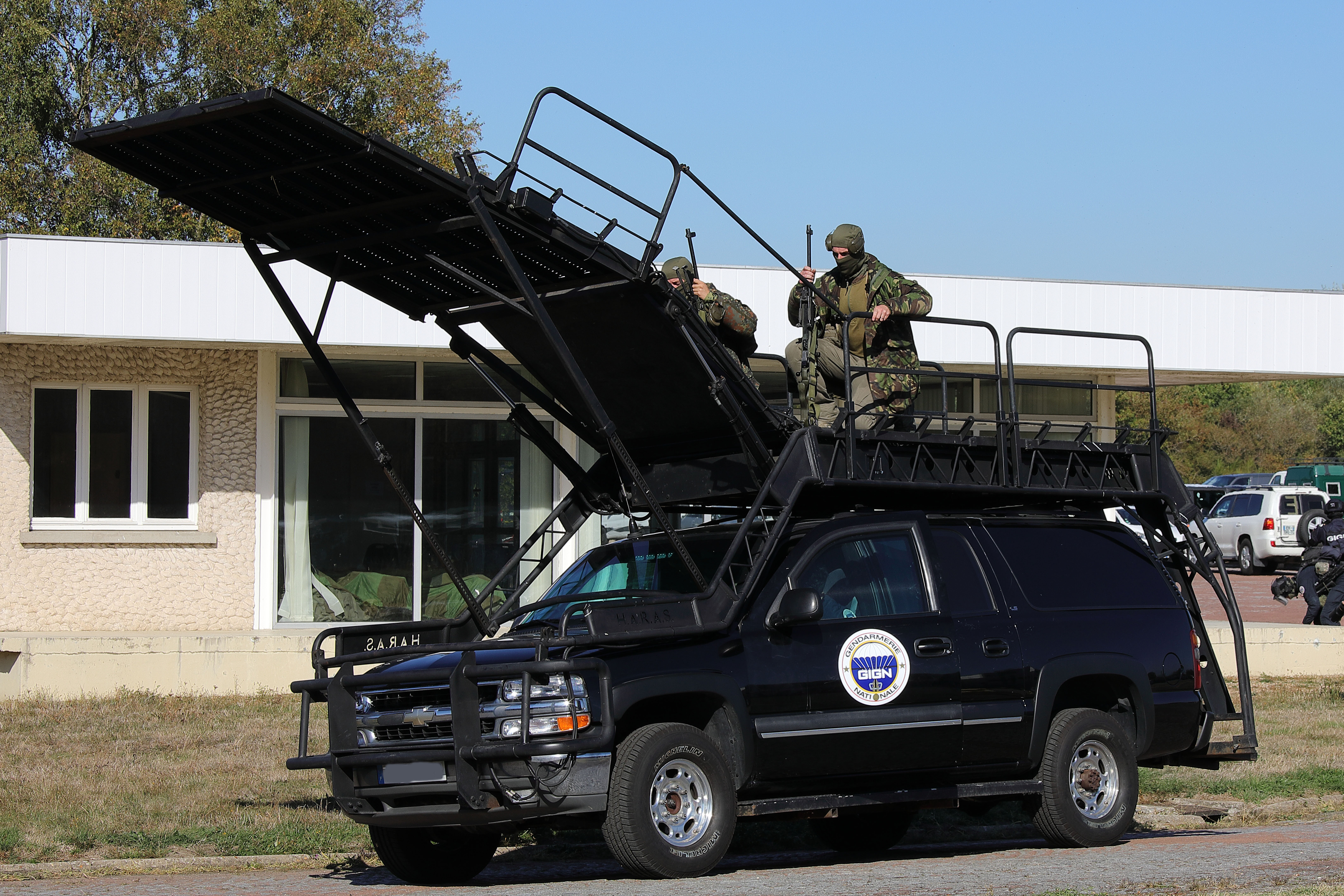
A vehicle used by GIGN featuring a mechanical assault ladder mounted on its roof, essentially a modern version of a siege tower

In modern warfare, some vehicles used by police tactical units, counterterrorists, and special forces can be fitted with mechanical assault ladders with ramps. These are essentially modernized siege towers with elements of escalade ladders, and are used to raid a structure through its upper levels. These assault ladders are not as large or as tall as their predecessors, and are typically only capable of reaching roughly the third or fourth floor of a structure.

On 1 March 2007, police officers entered Ungdomshuset in Copenhagen, Denmark using boom cranes in a manner similar to siege towers. The officers were placed in containers that the crane operators raised and placed against the structure's windows, from which the officers then entered.

== See also ==
- Ancient Greek military personal equipment
- Chinese siege weapons
- Helepolis
- List of siege engines
- Category:Siege equipment

== Bibliography ==
- Turnbull, Stephen (2008), The Samurai Invasion of Korea 1592-98, Osprey Publishing Ltd
