= Mişätamaq =

Mişätamaq /mee-shah-tah-MAHQ/, was a Tatar rebel castle, which was constructed during the Kazan War for the restoration of the Khanate of Kazan in 1552 to 1556. It was built in 1553 in the confluence of Myosha River and Kama River. It was situated 60 km south of Kazan (today Taşkirmän village (?!)). In 1556 the castle was besieged and ruined by troops of Ivan the Terrible.

== See also ==
- Çalım
