= Kazan Chronicle =

The Kazan Chronicle (Russian: Казанский летописец), also known as the Story of the Tsardom of Kazan (История Казанского Царства) or Kazan Story (Казанская история, Kazanskaya istoriya), is a document written between 1560 and 1565. The chronicler introduces himself as a Russian who was held in captivity in Kazan for about 20 years until Ivan the Terrible sacked Kazan in 1552. In some sources, his name is given as Ioann Glazaty (Иоанн Глазатый). While in captivity, the chronicler assumed Islam, which gave him substantial freedom to explore the local customs. The document deals with events from formation of Kazan Khanate in the first half of 15th century until its annexion in 1552. The authenticity of events, particularly events before the date when the chronicler came to Kazan, is doubtful. The chronicle contains numerous errors, and what appears to be complete fiction, mixed with genuine historical data. The chronicle was first published in print in Saint Petersburg in 1790.
