= Ivan Vyrodkov =

Russian engineer (?-1568)

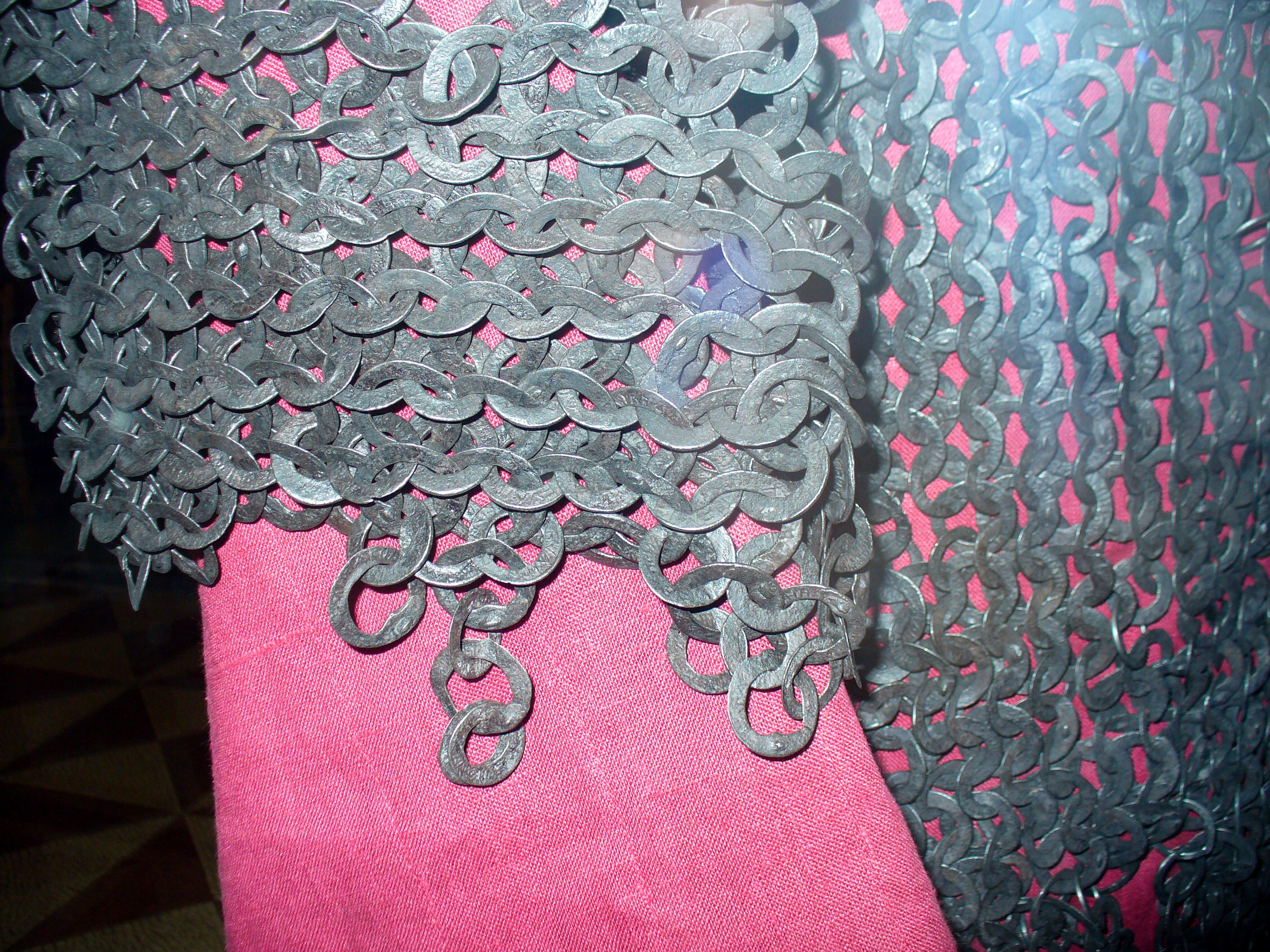
Vyrodkov's coat of mail is preserved in the State Historical Museum

Ivan Grigoryevich Vyrodkov (Russian: Иван Григорьевич Выродков; not later than 1520 – 1568) was a diak, Russian military engineer and inventor.

== Life ==
Ivan Vyrodkov's name was first mentioned in 1538. It is known that he participated in Ivan the Terrible's military campaigns against Kazan, during the Russo-Kazan Wars. In 1551, Ivan Vyrodkov was in charge of the construction of Sviyazhsk - a wooden fortress near Kazan that he would build in 28 days. This would serve as a strong point for the capture of the city by the Muscovite army.

In 1552, he supervised the fortification works during the siege of Kazan, and is credited for constructing a 12 metre high siege tower in just one night. Although older siege towers had been made obsolete by the advancement of artillery, Vyrodkov made a revolutionary alteration to the design: this new type of siege engine is more accurately described as a "battery-tower", as it was built for the bombardment of the city, able to hold ten large-calibre cannon and 50 lighter cannon. This allowed a concentration of artillery fire on a section of the wooden wall or city, which played a crucial role in shattering Tatar resistance. Nonetheless, it is certain that the few cannon defending Kazan would first have to have been put out of action in order for the tower to be effective, as it would otherwise have been an obvious target for any remaining artillery.

After the war, in 1557, Vyrodkov built a fortress and a harbor at the mouth of the Narva River and a fort in Galich. In 1563, Vyrodkov commanded the so-called pososhniye lyudi (recruits) during a military campaign against Polotsk. In 1568, he and his seventeen relatives, including children, were executed for an unknown reason in the course of the oprichnina.

== See also ==
- List of Russian inventors

== Sources ==
- Russian Fortresses, 1480–1682, Osprey Publishing, ISBN 1-84176-916-9
