= Alexander Gorbaty-Shuysky =

Russian general (d. 1565)

Prince Alexander Borisovich Gorbatyi-Shuisky (Russian: Александр Борисович Горбатый-Шуйский; died 1565) was a Russian general during the reign of Ivan the Terrible.

== Life ==
He belonged to the powerful Shuisky family, being the last scion of its junior branch. His father was one of the successful generals of Vasily III, but Alexander managed to outshine him at an early age. He was made boyar in 1544 and led the Russian armies against Khanate of Kazan in 1547.

Five years later, when Kazan was besieged, he annihilated the force of prince Yapancha at Arsk Field, making possible the final conquest of Kazan later that year. In acknowledgement of his important services, he was appointed the first Russian governor of Kazan. During the next decade he not only managed to keep Kazan in Russian hands, but also rebuilt the ruined citadel and converted a large portion of the khanate's population to Christianity.

Ivan the Terrible, apparently, grew jealous of Alexander's popularity in Moscow. In 1564, the tsar incriminated him of secretly supporting Andrey Kurbsky and plotting against Ivan's life. After that, Alexander and his 17-year-old son Peter were brought to Moscow and beheaded.

He left two daughters, one of them being married to the noblest Muscovite boyar, Prince Ivan Mstislavsky, and another one – to the tsar's brother-in-law, Nikita Romanovich as his second wife. The latter was grandfather of tsar Mikhail Romanov.
