= Qoşçaq =

Qoşçaq beg (died 1551) was a statesman (uğlan) in Khanate of Kazan. From 1546 to 1551 he was a head of government during the reigns of Safagäräy and Söyembikä. He struggled against pro-Muscovite opposition. After the victory of Şahğäli's coup, he was forced to escape from Kazan. Russians caught and executed him after he refused to be baptized.
