= Yadegar Mokhammad of Kazan =

Yadegar Mokhammad
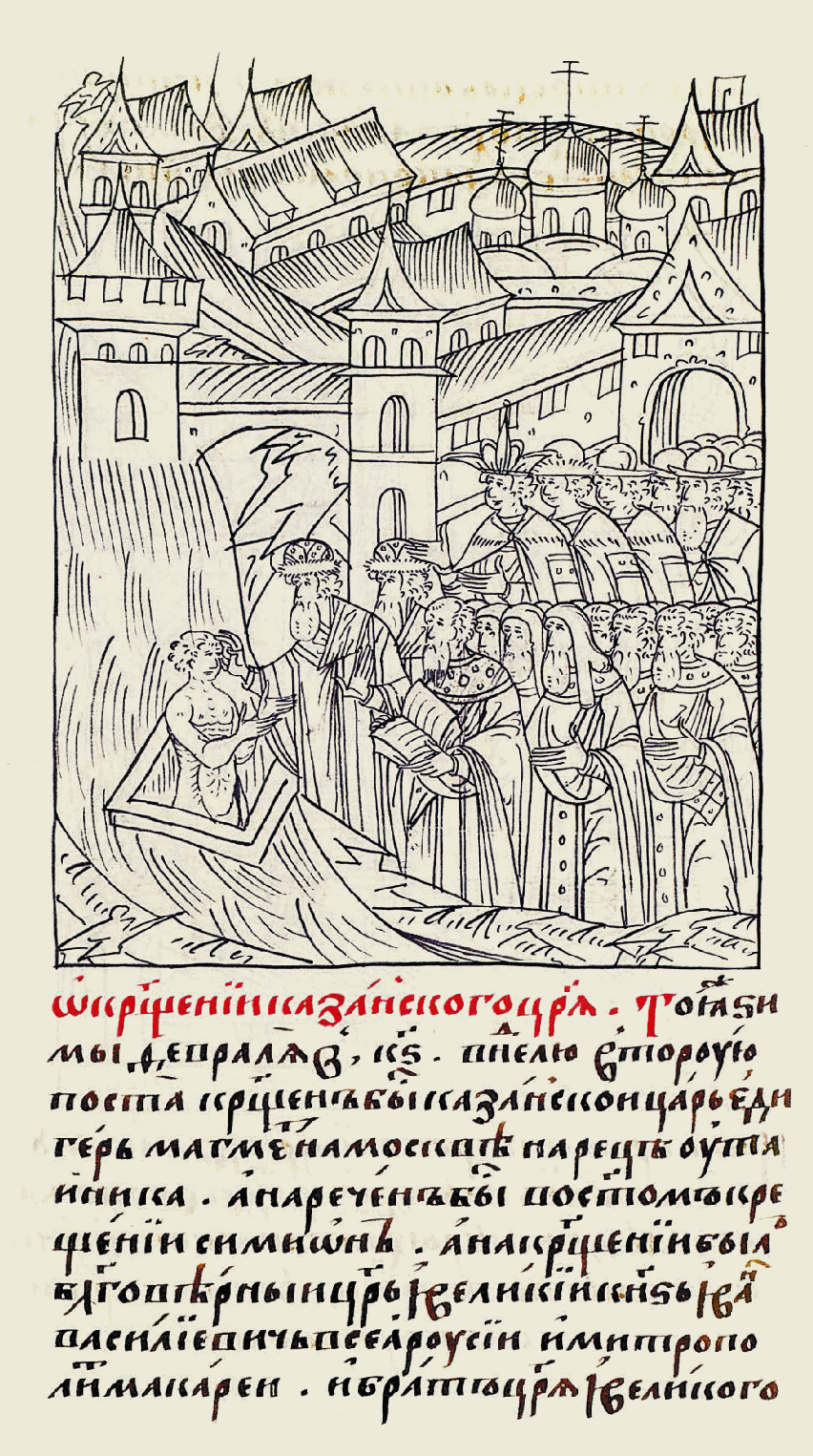

Khan of the Tatar Kazan Khanate
- Reign: March – October 1552
- Predecessor: Shahghali
- Successor: Monarchy abolished
- Born: c. 1494
- Died: 1565 (aged 71)
- Father: Qasim II of Astrakhan

Yadegar Mokhammad (Volga Türki and Persian: یادگار محمد; Tatar: Yädegär Möxämmäd, Yädkär, Yädegär, [jædeˈɡær mœxæmˈmæt]) (died 1565) was the last khan of the Kazan Khanate, occupying the position from March to October 1552. He was the son of Astrakhan khan Qasim II. Between 1542 and 1550 he was in the service of the Tsardom of Russia. In 1550, he participated in the attack on Kazan and then joined the Nogais. After the Kazan Khanate was nearly brought to defeat by Ivan the Terrible's forces in 1550, in 1551 the "peace party" in Kazan enthroned the pro-Russian khan Shah Ali. In 1552 the anti-Russian "patriotic party" regained power. Shah Ali fled and Yadegar was invited by Qol Sharif and Chapqin bek Otich uli (Çapqın bäk Otıç ulı, [ɕʌpˈqɯn bæk ɔˈtɯɕuˈlɯ]) to the throne of the Kazan Khanate. Subsequently, he led the war against the Russian invasion (see Siege of Kazan). He was captured in October 1552 when Russian troops took Kazan. In 1553 he converted to Christianity, assumed the name of Simeon Kasayevich and lived in Moscow as a Russian nobleman. He was one of the last great descendants of Jochi Khan, the eldest son of the Genghis Khan.

Preceded by Shahghali	Khan of Kazan; 1552	Succeeded by Ivan IV of Russia (as Tsar of Kazan) (Khanate absorbed by Russia)
