= Alat, Russia =

Rural locality in Vysokogorsky District, Tatarstan

Coordinates: 56.195°N 49.211°E

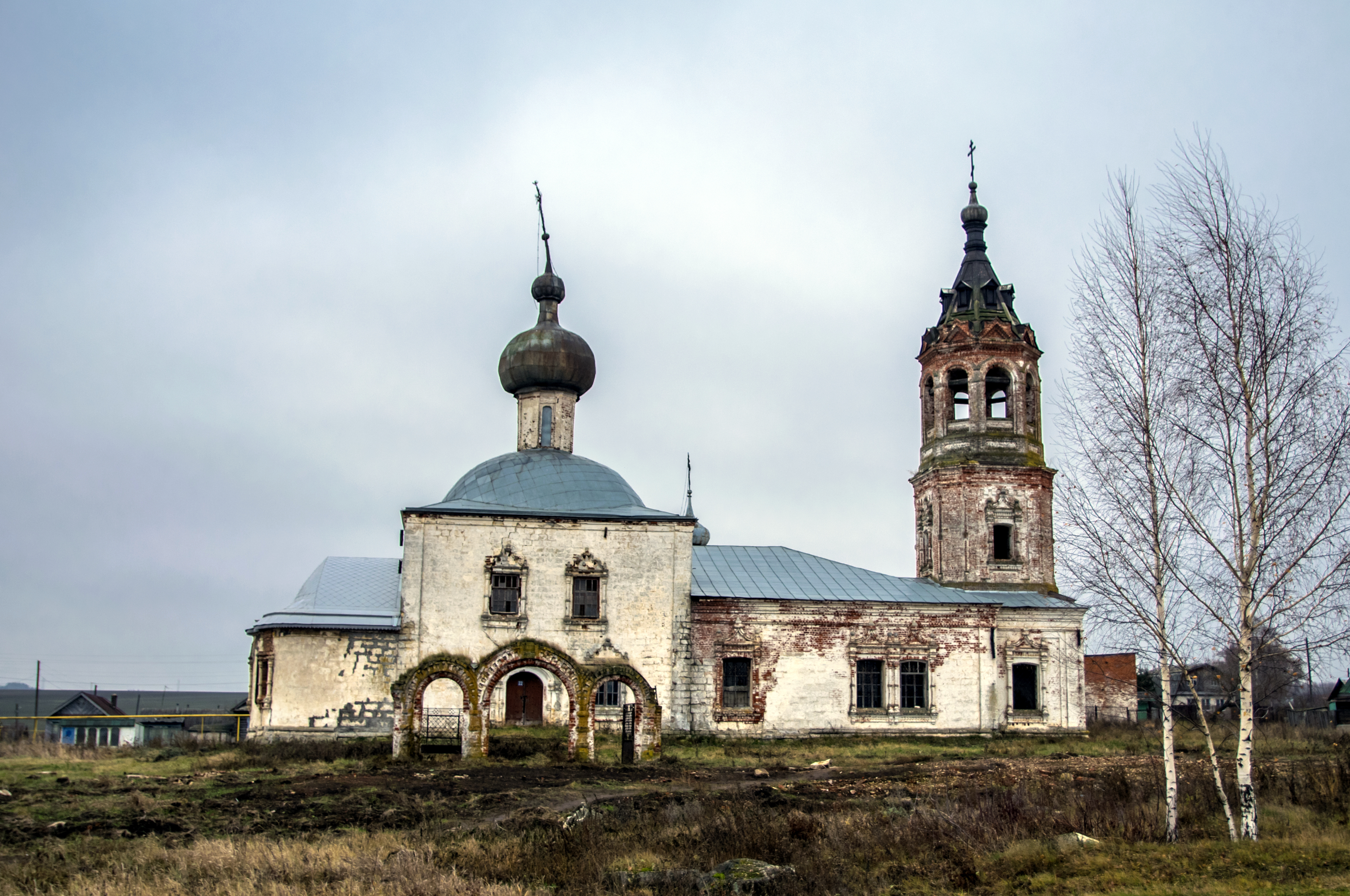
Ruined church in Alat, Tatarstan.

Alat (Russian: Алат; Tatar: Урыс Алаты) is a village (selo) in Vysokogorsky District of the Republic of Tatarstan, Russia. The village is situated on the Ashit River, 33 kilometers (21 mi) to the north of Vysokaya Gora railway station. In 2000, its population numbered 212; in 1989, it was 210. All residents of Alat are ethnic Russians.

Alat was founded in the epoch of Kazan Khanate and was an administrative center of the Alat darugha. In 1708–1766, it was a town in the Kazan Governorate. In 1758, a distillery was established in the neighborhood. In the 19th century, the village was known for its brickworks and potteries.

The population is engaged in cattle-breeding. There is a secondary school and a club in the village. The Church of the Assumption dates back to the first quarter of the 18th century.
