= Russo-Kazan Wars =

1439–1552 wars between Kazan and Russia

Date	1437–1439, 1445; 1467–1469; 1486–1487; 1505–1507; 1552–1556
Location	Khanate of Kazan and Muscovy
Result	Russian victory
Territorial changes	Khanate of Kazan conquered by the Tsardom of Russia

Belligerents
Grand Principality of Moscow (pre-1547); Tsardom of Russia (post-1547); Supported by: Qasim Khanate; Pro-Moscow factions in Kazan	Khanate of Kazan; Supported by: Crimean Khanate; Nogai Horde; Khanate of Sibir; Khanate of Bukhara; Anti-Moscow factions in Kazan

Commanders and leaders
Commanders: Vasily II (POW)(1439–1445); Ivan III (1467–1506); Qasim Khan (1467–1469); Daniil Kholmsky (1467, 1487); Möxämmädämin (1484–1519); Ghabdellatif (1496–1502); Vasily Kholmsky (1505–1507); Fyodor Belsky (1506); Shahghali (executed) (1518–1521, 1546, 1551–1552); Vasili III (1521–1541); Canghali (1532–1535); (Tsardom of Russia) Ivan the Terrible (1540–1552); (Tsardom of Russia) Alexander Gorbatyi-Shuisky (1547–1552); Ivan Vyrodkov (1547–1552)	Commanders: Ulugh Muhammad (1439–1445); Mäxmüd (1438–1466); Ibrahim (1467–1469, 1478); Ilham Ghali (surrendered) (1479–1487); Mamuq (1495–1496); Safa Giray (1524–1549); Yadegar Mokhammad (1552); (Crimean Khanate) Devlet I Giray (1551–1552)

The Russo-Kazan Wars were a series of short, intermittent wars fought between the Grand Principality of Moscow and the Khanate of Kazan between 1437 and 1556. Most of these were wars of succession in Kazan, in which Muscovy intervened on behalf of the dynastic interests of its main ally, the Crimean Khanate. For most of the period, neither side sought to conquer the other, until Ivan the Terrible decided to annex Kazan upon the successful 1552 siege, which was followed by a rebellion lasting until 1556.

== General ==
Before it separated from the Golden Horde, the Kazan region was part of Volga Bulgaria (c. 630–1240) and then the Bulgar Ulus of the Golden Horde (c. 1240–1438). They adopted Islam in 921, several decades before the Christianisation of Kievan Rus' was boosted by the conversion of Volodimer in c. 988. In the 1430s, the Khanate of Kazan emerged on the mid-Volga, breaking away from the Golden Horde, and roughly comprising the area of former Volga Bulgaria.

Charles J. Halperin (1987) noted: 'Muscovy's relations with the Kazan' khanate were complex, her aggressive intentions tempered by the lure of trade and her own limited military capability.' Both Kazan and Muscovy experienced wars of succession within their reigning families in the 15th and 16th century. The Muscovite War of Succession between Vasily Vasilyevich and his uncle Dmitry Shemyaka tore Muscovy apart from 1425 to 1453, while Ulugh Muhammad (Ulu-Mehmed), the first khan of Kazan, was murdered by his son Mäxmüd (Mahmutek), who then expelled his brothers Qasim and Yakub. For most of the decades-long intermittent conflict, neither the Kazanians sought to conquer Moscow, nor did the Muscovites make any attempt to conquer Kazan.

The foreign policy of Ivan III centred on his alliance with the Crimean Khanate, and both Ivan III and Vasily III used their military might to uphold the dynastic interests of the Crimean khans in Kazan. The princes of Moscow contented themselves with maintaining a pro-Crimean khan on the Kazan throne whenever they could exploit a dynastic conflict. Although Ivan III failed to put a puppet on the throne during the 1466–1469 Kazan succession crisis, the 1469 peace treaty meant 20 years of relative peace between Muscovy and an initially anti-Muscovite khan, Ibrahim. During the 1486–1487 succession dispute, however, Ivan managed to place the Crimean khan Meñli I Giray's stepson Möxämmädämin (Muhammed Amin) on the throne of Kazan. When Ivan III died in 1505, his will still allocated tributes to the Qasim Khanate, the Crimean Khanate, the Astrakhan Khanate, and the Khanate of Kazan, although the sums were smaller than those of previous Muscovite princes. Vasily III continued Ivan's pro-Crimean policies, and during their reigns, the Khanate of Kazan, the Principality of Moscow and the Crimea Khanate were allies, the latter being the senior partner of the other two.

The boundary between Muscovy and Kazan was near Nizhny Novgorod, about halfway between the two cities. The land east of Nizhny Novgorod was fairly difficult. Whenever the Tatars attacked, they would first hit Nizhny Novgorod and then move on Murom, Ryazan, and other places, only twice approaching Moscow. When the Rus' attacked, they would usually send two armies, one down the Volga, and one over land. As Muscovy grew stronger, fighting shifted eastward.

== Wars of Vasily II ==
=== 1437–1439 ===
In 1437, the khan of Kazan, Ulugh Muhammad, defeated Muscovite troops in the Battle of Belyov. In 1439, Ulugh advanced on Moscow with a large army. Vasily II of Moscow fled from his capital across the Volga River. Tatars devastated the outskirts of Moscow for 10 days and on their way back to Kazan burned Kolomna; they also took many captives.

=== 1445 ===
The campaign of 1445 was disastrous for Muscovy and had major repercussions in Russian politics. Hostilities broke out when khan Ulugh Muhammad (Ulu-Mehmed) took the strategic fortress of Nizhny Novgorod and invaded Muscovy. Vasily II mustered an army and defeated the Tatars near Murom and Gorokhovets. Thinking the war over, he disbanded his forces and returned to Moscow in triumph, only to learn that the Tatars had besieged Nizhny Novgorod again. A new army was mustered and marched towards Suzdal, where they met the Russian generals who had surrendered Nizhny to the enemy after setting the fortress on fire. On 7 July 1445, the Russians and the Tatars clashed in the Battle of Suzdal near the walls of St. Euphemius Monastery. The battle was a resounding success for the Tatars, who took Vasily II prisoner. It took four months (July–November 1445) and an enormous ransom to recover the monarch from captivity.

Ulugh Muhammad (Ulu-Mehmed) died in late 1445, murdered by his eldest son Mäxmüd of Kazan (Mahmutek). A conflict arose over the throne of Kazan, and in 1447, Mäxmüd expelled two brothers named Qasim (Kasim) and Iakub, who fled to Muscovy and offered to aid Vasily in his bid for the throne against Dmitry Shemyaka. It was in part due to these renegade Kazan princes' help that Vasily was able to regain the Muscovite throne. In 1452, Vasily would grant the former a small fiefdom known as the Qasim Khanate, centred on the town of Kasimov on the Oka River, with revenues collected from neighbouring Ryazan.

=== 1458–1462 raids on tributaries ===
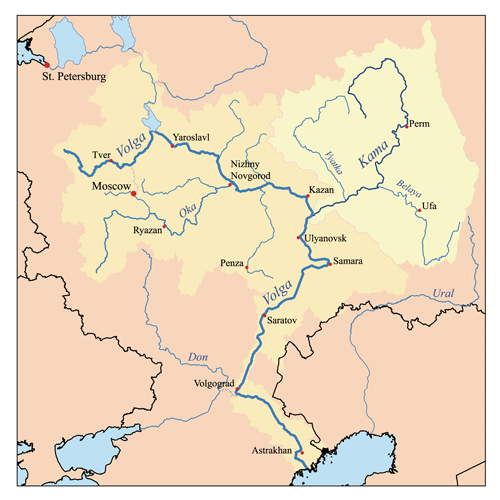
Volga basin, highlighting the Kama and Vyatka left-bank tributaries

Since its formation in the 1430s and 1440s, the Khanate of Kazan had claimed tribute from peoples living on the (upper) Kama river and Vyatka river (left-bank tributaries of the Volga), as well as controlling access to the best routes across the Ural Mountains into western Siberia. To disrupt this control, Muscovy performed several raids into the upper Kama and Vyatka river regions between 1458 and 1462. A Kazan counter-raid at outposts near Ustyug failed. One of the Kazan tributaries that the Muscovites sought to take control of was Great Perm.

== Wars of Ivan III ==
=== Qasim War (1467–1469) ===
The death of Mäxmüd of Kazan in 1466 or 1467 triggered a war of succession in the khanate between his son Ibrahim and his brother Qasim, the vassal of Ivan III (succeeded Vasily in 1462). Ivan's army sailed down the Volga, with their eyes fixed on Kazan, but autumn rains and rasputitsa ("quagmire season") hindered the progress of Russian forces. When frosty winter came, the Russian generals launched an invasion of the northern Vyatka Region. The campaign fell apart for lack of unity of purpose and military capability.

The following year, the Russians set out from Kotelnich in the Vyatka Land. They sailed down the Vyatka River and the Kama towards the Volga, pillaging merchant vessels on their way. In response, Ibrahim mounted a counter-offensive, overran Vyatka, and forced local inhabitants into slavery for the duration of the campaign.

In 1469, a much stronger army was raised and, sailing down the Volga and the Oka, linked up in Nizhny Novgorod. The Russians marched downstream and ravaged the neighbourhood of Kazan but did not dare to lay siege to the Tatar capital because Qasim's widow had pledged to negotiate an advantageous peace with Ibrahim (her son). In the meantime, the units from Yaroslavl and Veliky Ustyug vainly attempted to win Vyatka to the Russian side. After negotiations were broken, the Tatars clashed with the Russians in two bloody but indecisive battles.

In autumn 1469 Ivan III launched a third invasion of the khanate. The Russian commander, Prince Daniil Kholmsky, besieged Kazan, cut off water supplies, and compelled Ibrahim to surrender. Ivan failed to get Qasim on the throne of Kazan, and had to recognise Ibrahim as the legitimate successor in a 1469 peace treaty. Under the terms of the peace settlement, the Tatars set free all the ethnic Christian Russians they had enslaved in the forty previous years. Qasim died soon after.

=== 1470s–1480: Muscovite–Crimean alliance formed ===
A map of successor states of the Golden Horde.

Meanwhile, the death of Hacı I Giray in 1466 triggered a war of succession in the Crimean Khanate between his sons Nur Devlet (Nur-Daulet), Hayder (Aidar, Khaidar), and Meñli (Mengli). In the early 1470s (certainly by 1475), Meñli forged an alliance with Ivan III of Moscow against his brothers. In 1475, the Ottomans also conquered Caffa for Meñli in return for becoming an Ottoman vassal. By 1478, Meñli had chased his brothers out of the khanate, with Nur Devlet being exiled to Kyiv in the Grand Duchy of Lithuania, later entering in Muscovite military service. The Crimeans and Muscovites waged simultaneous raids against the Great Horde and Lithuania. Ibrahim of Kazan maintained good relations with the Great Horde until his death around 1486. In 1478, some time before his death, Ibrahim devastated the Vyatka region, which remained a bone of contention between Kazan and Moscow. In retaliation, Ivan III sent his generals to sack the neighbourhood of Kazan.

=== 1480s Kazan succession crisis ===
At that time Ibrahim died (c. 1486), he was succeeded by Ilham, whilst his half-brother Moxammat Amin fled to Moscow. Ivan III allowed him to settle in Kashira and pledged his support for Moxammat's claims to the Tatar throne. Meanwhile, the Crimean Khan Meñli married Ibrahim's widow, the mother of Moxammat Amin; this marriage was a great Crimean diplomatic victory, and also shifted the allegiance of Kazan's ruling clan from the Great Horde to the Crimean Khanate. Meñli then devised a plan to put Moxammat Amin on Kazan's throne, and enlisted Ivan to carry it out. On behalf of the Crimean Khan, the Muscovites intervened in the Kazan succession struggle to replace Ilham with Moxammat Amin, the Crimean Khan's stepson. Prince Kholmsky sailed down the Volga from Nizhny Novgorod and laid siege to Kazan on 18 May 1487. The city fell to the Muscovites on 9 June. Ilham was sent in chains to Moscow before being imprisoned in Vologda, while Moxammat Amin was proclaimed the new khan.

=== Crimean–Muscovite–Kazan alliance (1487–1519) ===
With the enthronement of Moxammat Amin, Kazan became part of the alliance. The Crimean Khanate acted as the senior partner, the Khanate of Kazan as the junior partner, and the Principality of Moscow worked in between, using its military to uphold the Crimean dynastic interests in Kazan, and facilitating diplomatic messages between the two khanates. This Crimean–Muscovite–Kazan alliance would remain intact from 1487 until 1519.

=== Russo-Kazan War (1505–1507) ===
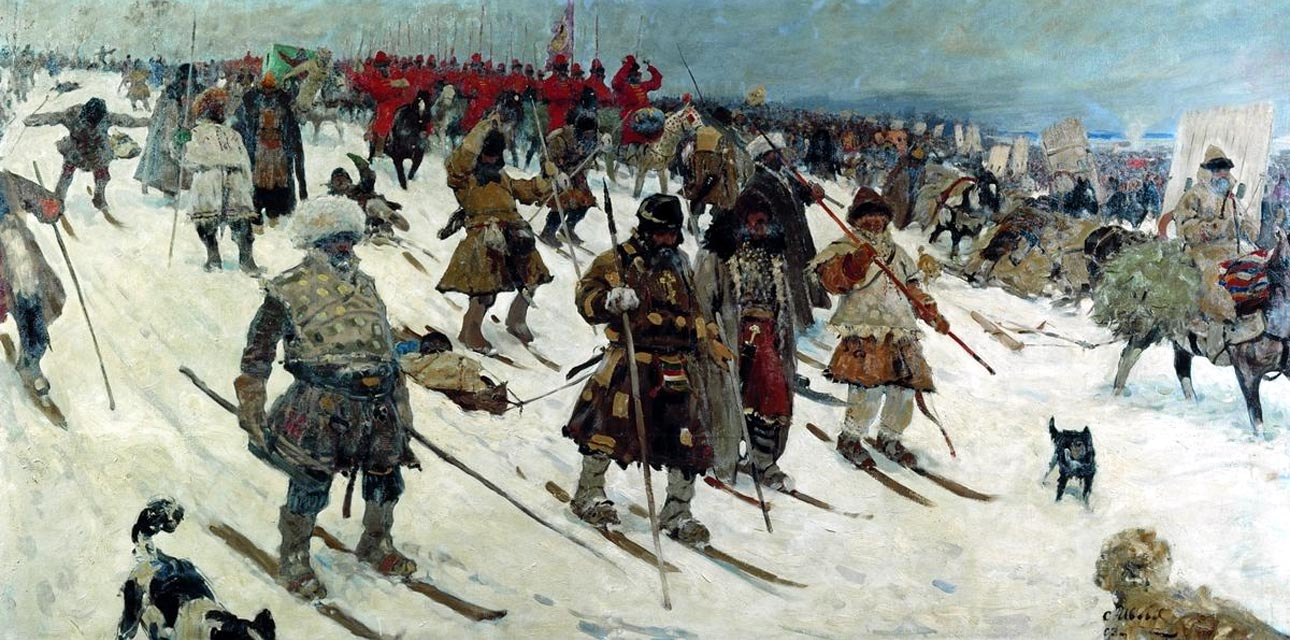
Campaign of Muscovites, 16th century. (S. Ivanov, 1903). Muscovites often used skis for transportation during winter campaigns.

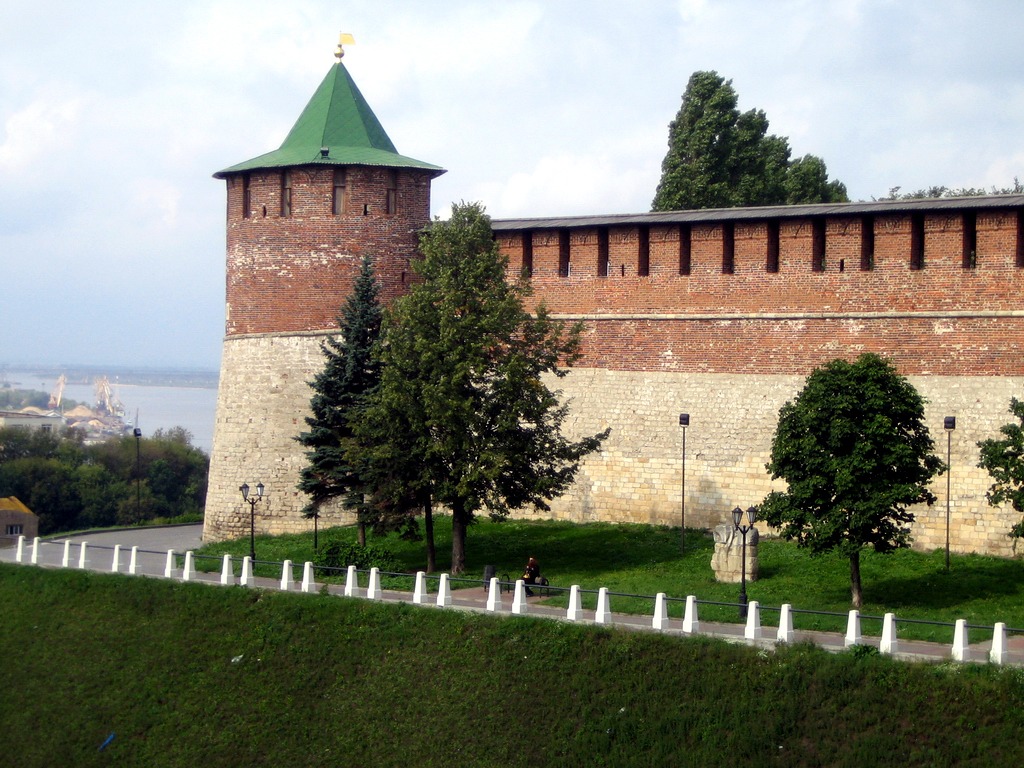
Tower of the Nizhny Novgorod kremlin, built in 1500–1511 to repel Kazan attacks.

The last war of Ivan's reign was instigated by Ilham's widow, who married Moxammat Amin and persuaded him to assert his independence from Moscow in 1505. The rebellion broke out into the open on Saint John's Day, when the Tatars massacred Russian merchants and envoys present at the annual Kazan Fair. A huge army of the Kazan and Nogai Tatars then advanced towards Nizhny Novgorod and besieged the city. The affair was decided by 300 Lithuanian archers, who had been captured by Russians in the Battle of Vedrosha and lived in Nizhny in captivity. They managed to put the Tatar vanguard into disarray: the khan's brother-in-law was killed in action and the horde retreated.

Ivan's death prevented hostilities from being renewed until May 1506, when Prince Fyodor Belsky led Russian forces against Kazan. After the Tatar cavalry attacked his rear, many Russians took flight or drowned in the Foul Lake (22 May). Prince Vasily Kholmsky was sent to relieve Belsky and defeated the khan on Arsk Field on June 22. Moxammat Amin withdrew to the Arsk Tower but, when the Russians started to celebrate their victory, ventured out and inflicted an excruciating defeat on them (June 25). Although it was the most brilliant Tatar victory in decades, Moxammat Amin – for some reason not clearly understood – resolved to sue for peace and paid homage to Ivan's successor, Vasily III of Russia.

== Wars of Vasily III ==
A new massacre of Russian merchants and envoys residing in Kazan took place in 1521. Vasily III was so enraged that he forbade his subjects to visit the Kazan Fair again. Instead, the famous Makariev Fair was inaugurated downstream from Nizhny Novgorod, an establishment which undermined the economical prosperity of Kazan, thus contributing to its eventual downfall.

In 1524, Prince Ivan Belsky led the 150,000-strong Russian army against the Tatar capital. This campaign is described in detail by a foreign witness, Sigismund von Herberstein. Belsky's huge army spent 20 days encamped on an island opposite Kazan, awaiting the arrival of Russian cavalrymen. Then news came that part of the cavalry had been defeated, and the vessels loaded with provisions had been captured by the Tatars. Although the army suffered from hunger, Belsky at once laid siege to the city and soon the Tatars sent their envoys proposing terms. Belsky accepted them and speedily returned to Moscow.

Prince Belsky returned to the walls of Kazan in July 1530. The khan had fortified his capital and built a new wall, yet the Russians set the city ablaze, massacring their rivals utterly (according to Rus' chronicles) and causing their enemy, Safa Giray, to withdraw to Arsk. The Tatars sued for peace, promising to accept any khan appointed from Moscow. The tsar put Shahgali's younger brother, Canghali, on the throne. He was murdered by the anti-Russian faction in 1535.

Rus' chronicles record about forty attacks of Kazan khans on northeastern Rus' territories (mainly the regions of Nizhniy Novgorod, Murom, Vyatka, Vladimir, Kostroma, and Galich) in the first half of the 16th century. Half of the Kazan raids occurred in the 1530s and 1540s. Besides 1521, most the ruinous Kazan attacks occurred in 1522, 1533, 1537, 1538, 1539, 1540, and 1541.

== Wars of Ivan IV ==
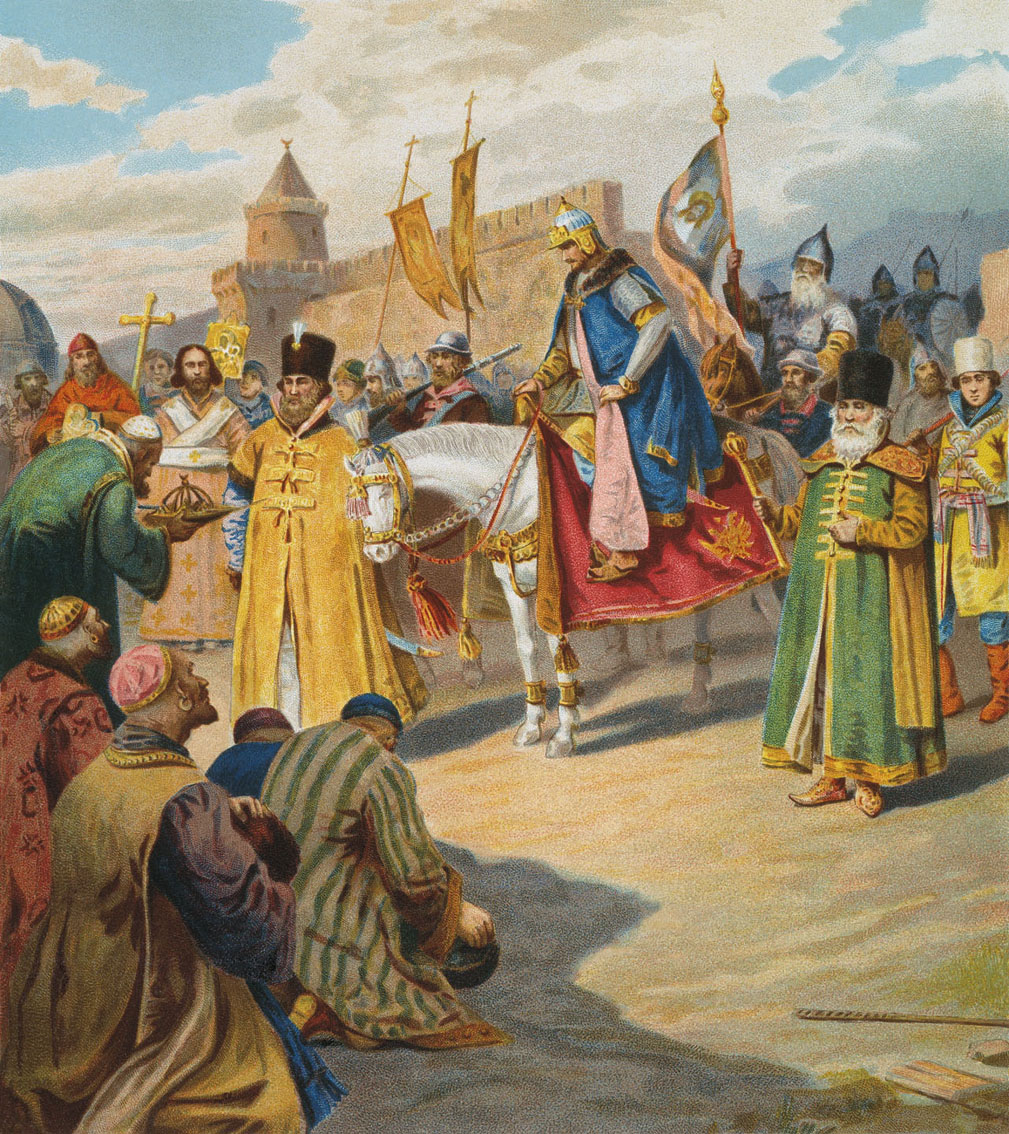
Ivan IV under the walls of Kazan

While Ivan IV was a minor, border skirmishes continued unabated, but the leaders of both powers were reluctant to commit their troops to open conflicts. In 1536, the Russians and Tatars were on the brink of a new war and met near Lyskovo, but the battle was averted. Over the following years, the Crimean khan constructed an offensive alliance with Safa Giray of Kazan, his relative. When Safa Giray invaded Muscovy in December 1540, the Russians used Qasim Tatars to contain him. After his advance was stalled near Murom, Safa Giray was forced to withdraw towards his own borders.

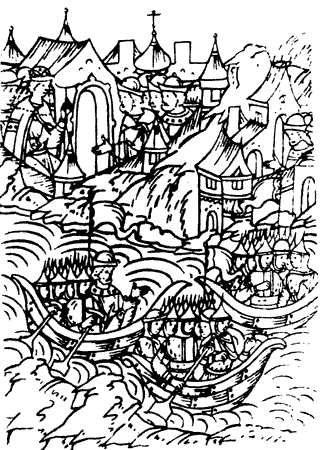
Russian troops departing for Kazan in 1545 (drawing from a contemporary manuscript).

These reverses undermined Safa Giray's authority in Kazan. A pro-Russian party, represented by Shahgali, gained enough popular support to usurp the throne more than once. In 1545, Ivan IV mounted an expedition to the Volga River, mainly in order to flex muscles and to show his support for pro-Russian factions. Little was achieved during the campaign of 1547-48 and the story was much the same for 1549-50.

In 1551, detailed schemes for the eventual conquest of Kazan started to be aired. The tsar sent his envoy to the Nogai Horde and they promised to maintain neutrality during the impending war. The Ar begs and Udmurts submitted to Russian authority as well. In 1551, the wooden fort of Sviyazhsk was transported down the Volga from Uglich all the way to Kazan. It was used as the Russian place d'armes during the decisive campaign of 1552.

== Conquest of Kazan and rebellion (1552–1556) ==
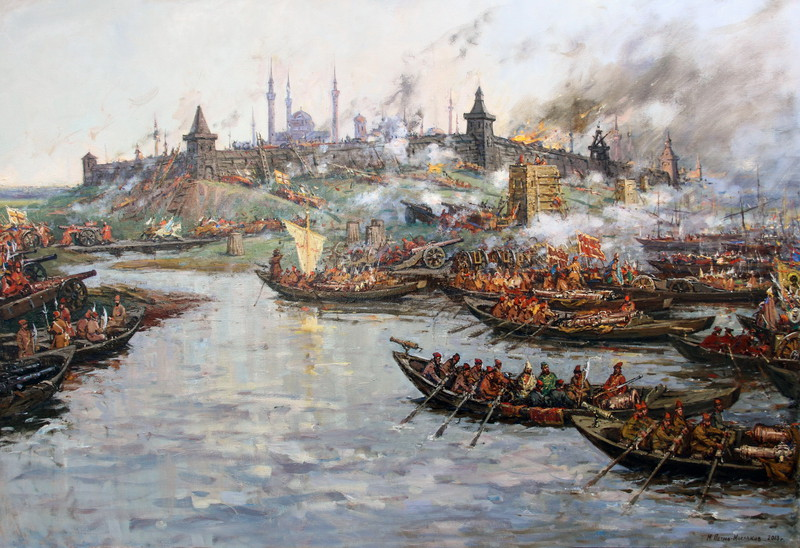
Conquest of Kazan in 1552

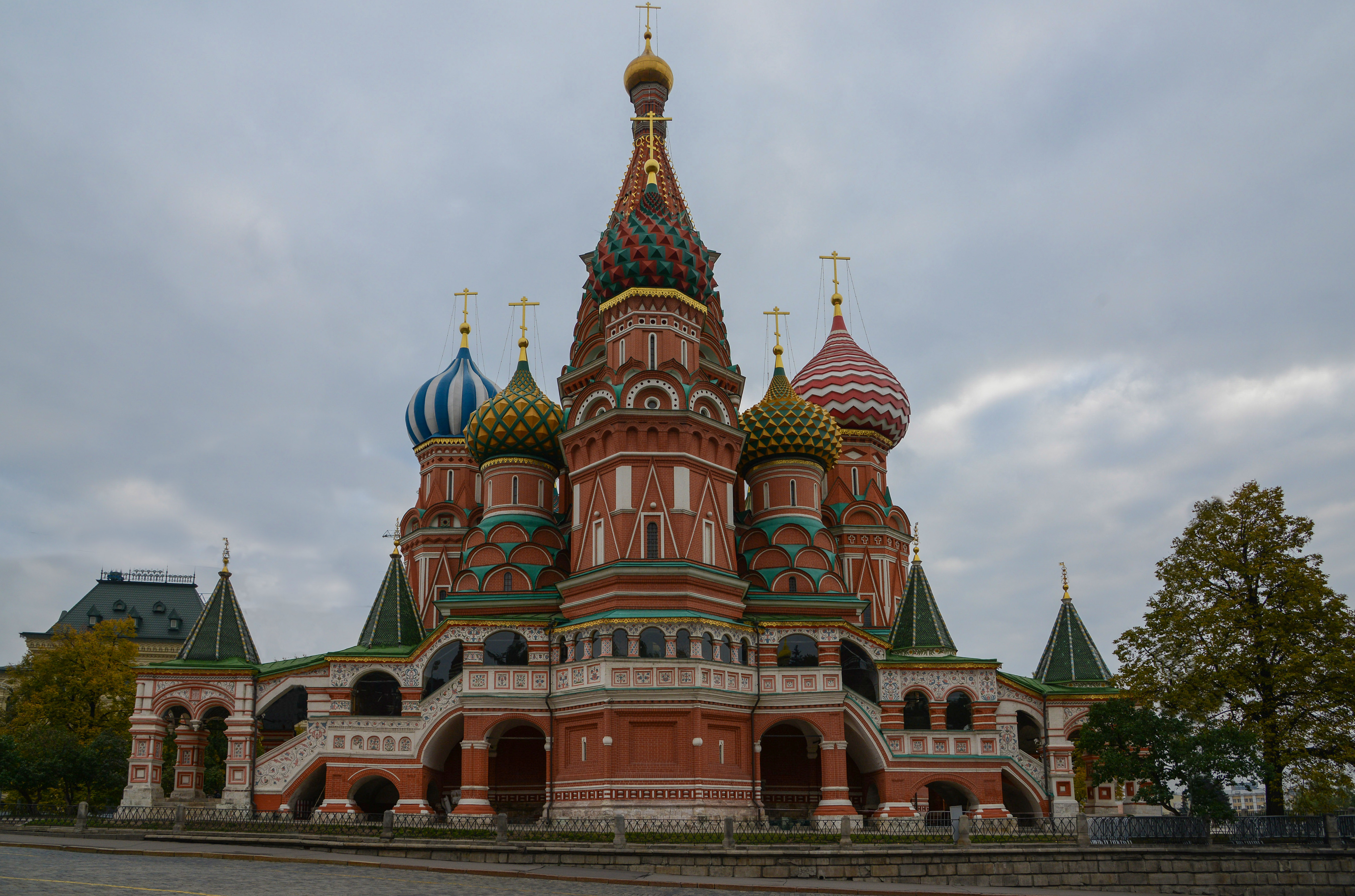
St. Basil's Cathedral is a monument to the 1552 Russian conquest of Kazan

On 16 June 1552 Ivan IV led a 150,000-strong Russian army from Moscow towards Kolomna. They routed the Crimean Tatars under Devlet Giray near Tula before turning to the east. The tsar pressed on towards Kazan, and the final siege of the Tatar capital commenced on 30 August. Under the supervision of Prince Alexander Gorbatyi-Shuisky, the Russians used ram weapons, a battery-tower, mines, and 150 cannons. The Russians had the advantage of efficient military engineers, such as Ivan Vyrodkov, Nemchin Erazm ("Rozmysl") from the Grand Duchy of Lithuania, and the English engineer Butler. The besiegers blocked the city's water supply and breached the walls before the final storming on 2 October led to the taking of the city of Kazan, and the razing of its fortifications.

The conquest of Kazan had as its primary effect the assertion of Moscow's control over the Middle Volga. The Bashkirs accepted Ivan IV's authority two years later. The tsar celebrated his victory over Kazan by building several churches with oriental features, most famously Saint Basil's Cathedral on Red Square in Moscow. The siege of Kazan forms the subject of the longest poem in the Russian language, Mikhail Kheraskov's epic Rossiada (1771–1779).

After the fall of Kazan, a guerrilla uprising known as the Kazan rebellion or Kazan War (1552–1556) started in the region, lasting several years until its final suppression in 1556. The Tsar responded with a policy of Christianization and Russification of his Tatar subjects and other indigenous peoples, an approach not reversed until the time of Catherine the Great (reigned 1762–1796).

== See also ==
- Timeline of the Golden Horde
- Russo-Crimean Wars

== Bibliography ==
- Bosworth, Clifford Edmund (2007), Historic cities of the Islamic world, Brill Publishers, ISBN 978-90-04-15388-2
- Fennell, John Lister Illingworth (1962), Ivan the Great of Moscow, Macmillan Publishers
- Halperin, Charles J. (1987). Russia and the Golden Horde: The Mongol Impact on Medieval Russian History. Indiana University. p. 222. ISBN 9781850430575. (e-book).
- Martin, Janet (2007). Medieval Russia: 980–1584. Second Edition. E-book. Cambridge: Cambridge University Press. ISBN 978-0-511-36800-4.
- Pelenski, Jaroslaw (1974). Russia and Kazan: Conquest and Imperial Ideology (1438–1560s). Near and Middle East monographs. The Hague / Paris: Mouton. p. 368. ISBN 978-3-11-194174-5.
- Raffensperger, Christian; Ostrowski, Donald (2023). The Ruling Families of Rus. Reaktion Books. ISBN 978-1-78914-715-5.
- Solovʹev, Sergeĭ Mikhaĭlovich (1976), History of Russia: The age of Vasily III, Academic International Press, ISBN 0-87569-066-1
