= Kul Sharif =

Kul Sharif or Qol Şärif (Volga Türki and Persian: قل شریف; Tatar: Кол Шәриф; Russian: Кул-Шариф; died 1552) was an Old Tatar language-poet, statesman, university professor and imam of the Khanate of Kazan.

He participated in some diplomatic missions on behalf of Kazan khans to the Tsardom of Russia and there carried out negotiations for the khanate's independence. In 1550 he concluded a deal with Moscow for mutual assistance and understand with each side sending an ambassador, a treaty which was soon after broken.

In 1552 he was one of leaders of Kazan's defense against the Russian troops of Ivan the Terrible. He also participated in the negotiations with Russian representatives in Sviyazhsk (Zöyä). After the Siege of Kazan started, he organized a group of students and defended the Khan Palace. He was killed during the battle.

Later, four of his poems were included in "The Book of Baqırğan". Qolşärif's literary legacy was published in "İ küñel, bu dönyadır (O soil, may be this world...)", a collection of verses (Kazan, 1997). It is believed that the authorship of the dastan "Qíssai Xöbbi xuca" also belongs to him. It was published in 1889.

== See also ==
- Islam in Tatarstan
- Kul Sharif Mosque
