= Çalım =

Çalım Tatar pronunciation: [ɕɒˈlɤ̞m] was a citadel and a staff of Tatar troops, which was constructed during the Kazan War for the restoration of the Khanate of Kazan in 1552-1556. The citadel was constructed by the people under Mameshbirde at the right bank of Volga at the Sundır hill in 1555. It was situated in 160 çaqrım upper than Kazan. In 1556, it was seized by Russian troops and ruined.
