= Andrey Kurbsky =

Russian politician and military leader (1528–1583)

- Андрей Курбский
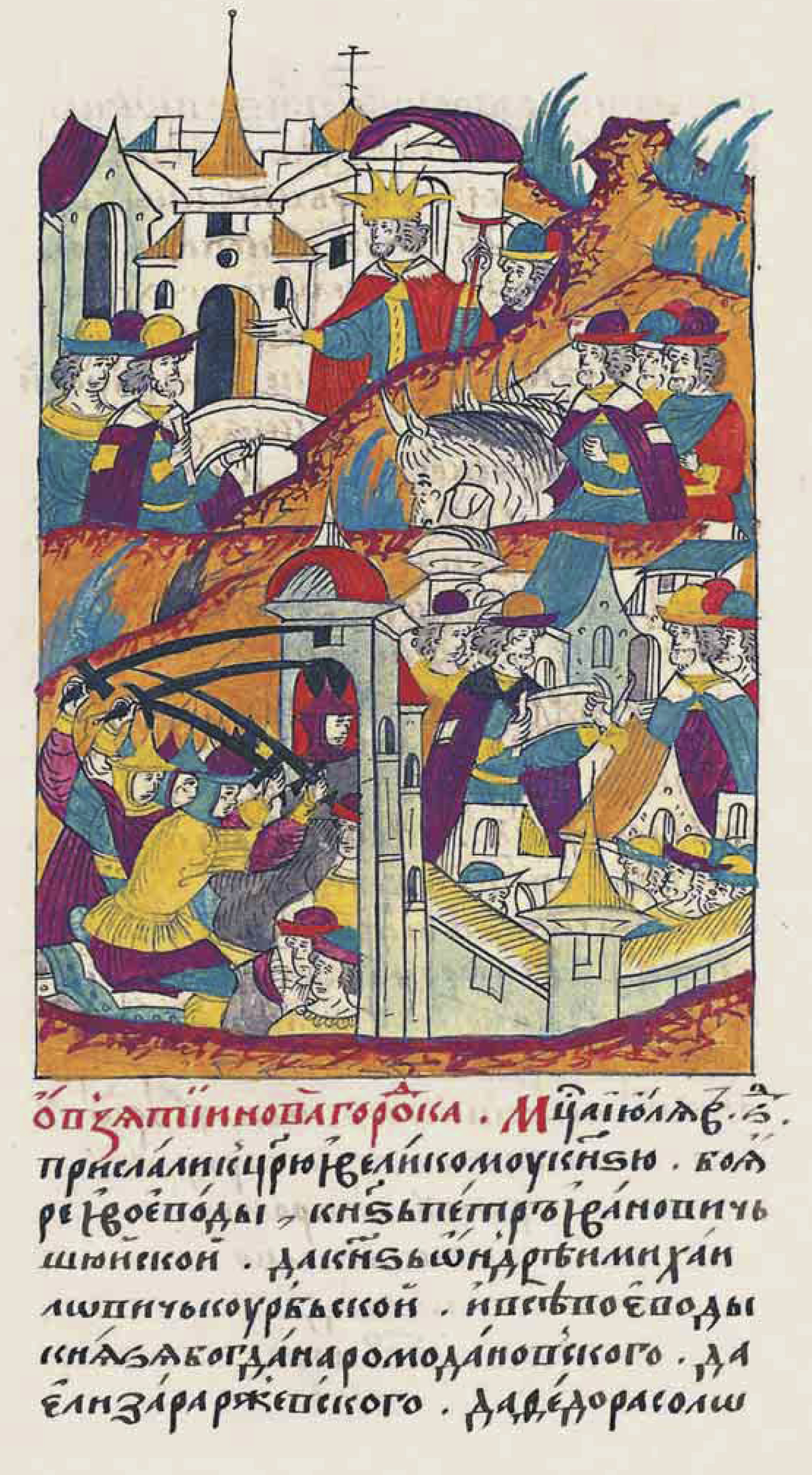
- Kurbsky in Novgorod, miniature from the Illustrated Chronicle of Ivan the Terrible
- Born: 1528? (Note: Based on the attribution of The History to Kurbsky, which proponents accept, but skeptics reject.)
- Died: 1583
- Father: Mikhail Kurbsky

Prince Andrey Mikhailovich Kurbsky (Note: Also transcribed as Andrei Kurbskii. Russian: Андрей Михайлович Курбский. Polish: Andriej Michajłowicz Kurbski.) (1528?–1583) was a Russian political figure, military leader, and political philosopher, known as an intimate friend and then a leading political opponent of the Russian tsar Ivan the Terrible (r. 1533–1584). He defected to the Grand Duchy of Lithuania around 1564, in the midst of the Livonian War.

Kurbsky purported correspondence with tsar Ivan provides a unique source for the history of 16th-century Russia, although the attribution to Kurbsky of these letters and other works has been debated in scholarly circles since 1971.

== Life ==
Andrey Kurbsky was born in the village of Kurba near Yaroslavl. In a legal document from 9 October 1571, he spelt his own name in Latin letters as Andrej Kurpski manu proprija, while declaring "I am unable to write in Cyrillic." Given that all texts that have been preserved in his name or have been attributed to him have been written in Cyrillic, this has posed problems for proponents of authenticity. On the other hand, there is evidence that Kurbsky owned books, and proponents and skeptics agree that he could have dictated some texts to be written by someone else.

Based on the assumption that Kurbsky wrote the anonymous work The History of the Grand Prince of Moscow, several seemingly autobiographical details have been inferred from the text. For example, the unnamed author claims that he and his brother (who is not named) participated in the Siege of Kazan (1552) when he was "about twenty-four years old", leading proponents to conclude Andrey Kurbskii was born in 1528. But that is only correct if he wrote The History, and the Compilatory Version of The History does not describe the conquest of Kazan, so it might be an interpolation and not a fact from Kurbsky's own life. Boeck (2007) sought to demonstrate that the Full Version of The History was written later than the Compilatory Version, and that both borrowed significant amounts of text from the vita of Philip II, Metropolitan of Moscow, which was not written until after 1592 (at least 9 years after Kurbsky died in 1583).

During the Livonian War of 1558-1583, Kurbsky led the Russian troops against the Livonian fortress of Dorpat (in Russian sources Yuryev; today Tartu, Estonia), and was victorious (1558). After Ivan failed to renew his commission, Kurbsky defected to Lithuania on April 30, 1564, citing impending repressions as his reason. Later the same year he led a Polish-Lithuanian army against Russia and devastated the region of Velikie Luki. As a reward, Sigismund II August, king of the Polish–Lithuanian Commonwealth, gave him the town of Kovel in Volhynia (now in Ukraine), where he lived peacefully, defending his Orthodox subjects from Polish encroachments. Kurbsky thus became the first prominent Russian political emigre.

Kurbsky is best remembered for a series of vitriolic letters he exchanged with the tsar between 1564 and 1579. In 1573, he wrote a political pamphlet, which voiced the former independent princeling's disapproval of Ivan's slide towards absolutism. In his writings, Kurbsky blames the tsar for a number of pathologically cruel crimes, but historians still disagree as to whether his claims should be given credit. Kurbsky's language is remarkable for an abundance of foreign loan-words, especially from Latin, which he had mastered abroad.

Kurbsky's third marriage, late in life, was to Alexandra Petrovna Semashko. She raised their son Dmitri Kurbsky (Krupski), after his father died (1583) when he was one year old. Dmitrii went on to become a statesman in the grand duchy of Lithuania, and converted from Orthodoxy to Catholicism.

== Works attributed to Andrey Kurbsky ==
The works attributed to Andrey Kurbsky, collectively known as kurbskiana, may be divided into two groups: those in the Miscellany of Kurbskii (Russian: сборник Курбского, romanized: sbornik Kurbskogo) (a modern name that does not appear in any of the codices), and those outside it. In 2009, Konstantin Erusalimskii (European University at Saint Petersburg) published a critical edition and scholarly analysis of all the extant miscellanies of Kurbskii (Russian: сборники Курбского, romanized: sborniko Kurbskogo) which have survived in 85 manuscripts (the oldest dating from the 1670s) and, based primarily on their contents, classified them into five groups (recensions). Some of the texts in the miscellanies are anonymous, such as The History of the Grand Prince of Moscow and The History of the Eighth Council. Other texts in the miscellanies of Kurbskii are in fact attributed to different authors, such as Taranovskii, Guagnini, and Strykowski, leading Donald Ostrowski (2020) to remark: "[S]o the principle of attribution regarding the items in the Miscellany of Kurbskii is that any unattributed items were written by him", meaning Kurbskii.

=== Works attributed to Andrey Kurbsky in the Miscellany of Kurbskii ===
- The History of the Grand Prince of Moscow (Church Slavonic: Исторія о великомъ князѣ Московскомъ, romanized: Istoriia o velikom kniaze Moskovskom)
- Three (or five) letters to Ivan the Terrible (Russian: Иван Грозный, romanized: Ivan Groznyi). These are scholarly abbreviated K1, K2 and K3.
- 13 letters to Polish–Lithuanian recipients.
- The History of the Eighth Council (Church Slavonic: Исторія о осьмом соборе, romanized: Istoriia o osmom sobore).

=== Other works attributed to Andrey Kurbsky, outside the Miscellany of Kurbskii ===
- The preface to the Novyi Margarit ("New Pearl"), extant in two manuscripts, only one of which (dated to the 18th century) contains a text that reads: Preface of the much sinful Andrei Iaroslavskii. Ever since Ivanishev (1849) suggested that this must have been "Prince Andrei Kurbskii", scholars have debated its authorship and dating amongst the other works attributed to Kurbskii. Edward L. Keenan (1998) instead proposed that this Andrii was a Ruthenian monk from Jarosław (Ruthenian: Ярославл Yaroslavl), given its linguistic features and the fact that calling oneself "sinful" is typical for the writing style of monks. Nevertheless, both attributions to Kurbskii and a monk of Jarosław proved to be rather problematic.
- Three letters to Elder Vas'ian of the Pskov-Caves Monastery; the first and third letter name the author as "Prince Andrei Kurbskii".
- The preface to the Dialectica of John of Damascus.
- The preface to the Life of Simeon Metaphrastes.
- Marginal glosses to translations of John Chrysostom and John of Damascus.
- Translations
  - The completion of translation of the works Dialectica and On Syllogism of John of Damascus.
  - Works of John Chrysostom which entered into the Novyi Margarit.
  - An incomplete translation of Bogosloviia ("Theology") of John of Damascus.
  - Sermons 44 to 47 of John Chrysostom, according to the preface of the 1665 Moscow edition.
  - Some other anonymous translations of John of Damascus, according to M.A. Obolenskii.
  - Translations of a dialogue of Gennadius Scholarius, works of Pseudo-Dionisius the Areopagite, Gregory of Nazianzus, Basil of Caesarea, and others.
- A biographical notice on Maksim Grek.

=== Authorship studies ===
Much of the authorship question depends entirely on whether or not Kurbsky wrote the anonymous The History of the Grand Prince of Moscow (abbreviated The History), when it was first composed and put into circulation, who first attributed it to Kurbsky and when, when other writings attributed to Kurbsky became associated with it, and when all these writings were first collected into several miscellanies that contained disparate items, including anonymous works, works attributed to Kurbsky and to others. Proponents of authenticity such as Erusalimskii (2009) contend that Kurbsky wrote parts of The History in the second half of the 1570s, completing the text after 1581, and compiled a miscellany of his own works including The History before his death in 1583. Skeptics such as Boeck (2012) and Ostrowski (2020) contend that it is more likely that The History is a fabrication of the (late) 17th century, as there is no evidence of its existence between 1583 and the 1670s, and the attribution to Kurbsky has led to several unresolved anachronisms and contradictions.

== In popular culture ==
A dramatized account of his life, in which he is depicted as the second-most powerful aristocrat in Russia (second only to the tsar) who is constantly put under pressure by boyars who want to make him revolt against the imperial authority at Moscow, can be found in the epic 1945 work of Soviet film director Sergei Eisenstein, Ivan the Terrible.

== Bibliography ==
- Boeck, Brian J. (2007). "Eyewitness or False Witness? Two Lives of Metropolitan Filipp of Moscow". Jahrbücher für Geschichte Osteuropas. 55 (2). Franz Steiner Verlag: 161–177. ISSN 0021-4019. JSTOR 41052656.
- Boeck, Brian J. (2012). "Miscellanea Attributed to Kurbskii : The 17th Century in Russia Was More Creative Than We Like to Admit". Kritika: Explorations in Russian and Eurasian History. 13 (4). Slavica Publishers: 955–963.
- Halperin, Charles J. (1998). "Edward Keenan and the Kurbskii-Groznyi Correspondence in Hindsight". Jahrbücher für Geschichte Osteuropas. 46 (3). Franz Steiner Verlag: 376–403. ISSN 0021-4019. JSTOR 41050171.
- Ostrowski, Donald (2020). "Who Wrote the Works Attributed to Prince Andrei Kurbskii?". Who Wrote That? Authorship Controversies from Moses to Sholokhov. Cornell University Press. pp. 189–222. doi:10.7591/cornell/9781501749704.001.0001. ISBN 978-1-5017-4970-4.
