= Khanate of Kazan =

Tatar state on the Volga (1438–1552)

Coordinates: 55°47′N 49°09′E

Khanate of Kazan قزان خانلغی (Old Tatar)
- 1438–1552
- Battle standard Coat of arms (15th century) (Note: Report on the Council of Konstanz, held 1414-1418 by Ulrich Richental (1420-'30) on fol. 130a)

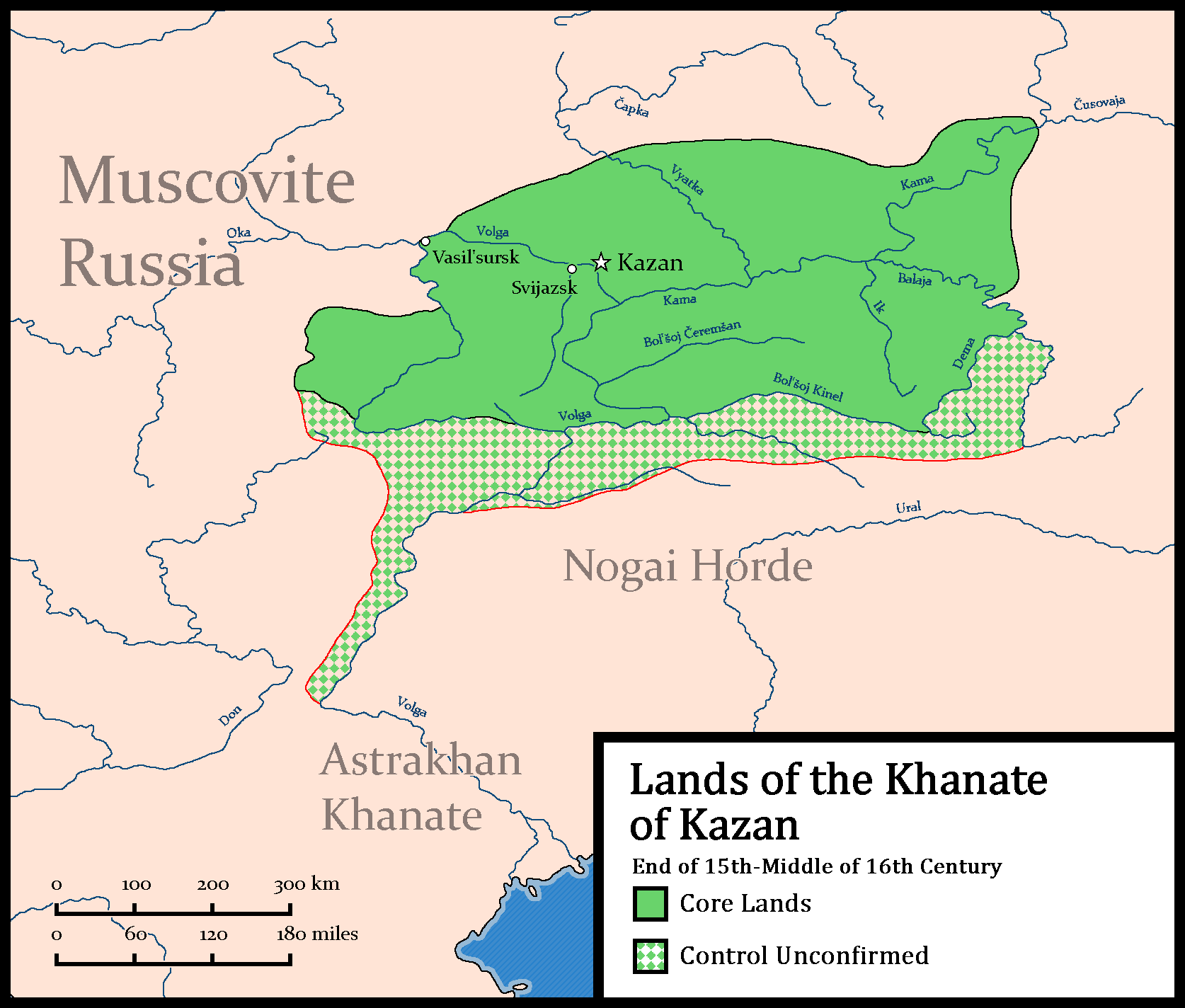
- The Khanate of Kazan, c. 1500–1550.
- Status: Khanate
- Capital: Kazan
- Official languages: Volga Turki
- Common languages: Turkic (Tatar, Chuvash, Bashkir); Mari; Udmurt; Mordvin
- Religion: Sunni Islam (Hanafi; state religion); Shamanism
- Kazan Khan
  - 1438–1445: Ulugh Muhammad (first)
  - March–October 1552: Yadegar Mokhammad (last)
- History
  - Elevation of Ulugh Muhammad: 1438
  - Conquest of Kazan by Ivan IV: 1552

Population
  - Mid-16th century: 450,000
Preceded by	Succeeded by
Golden Horde	Tsardom of Russia
- Today part of: Russia; Tatarstan; Mari El; Chuvashia; Udmurtia; Bashkortostan

The Khanate of Kazan, also called the Kazan Khanate, (Note: Old Tatar: قزان خانلغی; Tatar: Казан ханлыгы, romanized: Qazan xanlığı; Russian: Казанское ханство, romanized: Kazánskoye khánstvo) was a Tatar state on the Middle Volga, in the territory of the former Volga Bulgaria, from the mid-15th century until 1552. It covered present-day Tatarstan, Mari El, Chuvashia, Mordovia, and parts of Udmurtia and Bashkortostan; its capital was Kazan.

The khanate was one of the successor states of the Golden Horde. Historians date its founding either to 1437 or 1438, when Ulugh Muhammad took power in Kazan, or to 1445, when his son Maxmud began to rule there. Its history was marked by frequent changes of khan and by conflict between pro-Moscow and pro-Crimean groups in the nobility. From 1487 to 1521 the khanate was in effect a Muscovite protectorate. The Tsardom of Russia conquered it in 1552, after the siege of Kazan, and resistance in the former khanate continued until 1557.

The population included Tatars, Chuvash, Mari, Mordvins, Udmurts, and Bashkirs. Sunni Islam was the state religion. The khan was formally the sole ruler, but real power lay with the diwan, an assembly of the highest religious and secular aristocracy. The towns lived by crafts and by trade with Russia, Central Asia, and the Caucasus, and the Taşayaq fair in Kazan was the main fair of the Volga region.

== Geography and population ==
The territory of the khanate comprised the Muslim Bulgar-populated lands of the Bolğar, Cükätäw, Kazan, and Qaşan duchies and other regions that originally belonged to Volga Bulgaria. The Volga, Kama, and Vyatka were the main rivers of the khanate, as well as the major trade routes. The size of the Tatar population is disputed. The Chuvash encyclopedia describes the Tatars as a minority that formed the ruling class, and gives the tribute-paying Chuvash, about 200,000 people, as the largest group. Most of the population identified itself by religion, as Muslims, and people also called themselves "the people of Kazan" (qazanlılar). Sunni Islam of the Hanafi school was the state religion.

The local feudal nobility consisted of ethnic Bulgars, but the court and bodyguard of the Kazan khans were composed of steppe Tatars (Kipchaks, and later Nogais) who lived in Kazan. According to the Genghisid tradition, the local Turkic tribes were also called Tatars by the steppe nobility and, later, by the Russian elite. The highest nobility came from four ruling clans: Shirin, Barin, Arghin, and Qipchaq. In the 1540s and 1550s the Manghit clan was added to them.

Peoples subject to the khan included the Chuvash, Mari, Mordvins, Udmurts, and Bashkirs. Mishar Tatars and some Komi tribes also lived in the khanate. The Mishars had arrived during the period of the Golden Horde and gradually assimilated the resident Mordvins and Burtas. Their territory was governed by former steppe Tatars. Some Mishar duchies were never controlled from Kazan and instead gravitated toward the Qasim Khanate or Muscovite Russia.

Most of the khanate territory was covered by forests, and only the southern part adjoined the steppe. The main population of the steppes were the nomadic Manghites, also known as Nogais, who sometimes recognized the rule of the Kazan khan, but more often raided agricultural Tatars and Chuvash, as they had done in the Golden Horde period. Later, Nogais were transplanted and replaced with Kalmyks. More recently, this area was settled by Tatars, Chuvash, and Russians, who erected defensive walls to guard the southern border. Since the khanate was established, Tatar Cossack troops defended the khanate from the Nogais.

The most widely spoken language, and the official language, was Volga Turki (Old Tatar), which was used in administration and diplomatic correspondence. Prince Andrey Kurbsky wrote that five other languages were spoken in the khanate besides Tatar: Mordvin, Chuvash, Mari, Udmurt, and Bashkir. The Chuvash language was a descendant of the Bulgar language, which also strongly influenced the Middle dialect of the Tatar language.

== History ==
The former territories of Volga Bulgaria (Kazan Ulus or Kazan Duchy) may have regained a degree of independence within the disintegrating Golden Horde by the turn of the 15th century. Historians disagree about when the khanate was founded. One view dates it from 1437 or 1438, when Ulugh Muhammad, a former khan of the Golden Horde, took power in Kazan with the support of the local nobility. According to the Great Russian Encyclopedia, most sources support a second view, which dates the khanate from autumn 1445, when his son Maxmud began to rule in Kazan; Ulugh Muhammad's presence in Kazan is not confirmed. The History of the Tatars concludes that none of the versions of the founding is confirmed by even two independent sources.

Throughout its history, the khanate was prone to civil turmoil and struggles for the throne. Sources differ on the number of khans. Mikhail Khudyakov counted 15 khans in 118 years (1438–1556), some of whom reigned two or three times, while the Chuvash encyclopedia gives 14 khans in 114 years. Şahğäli reigned three times. (See List of Kazan khans.) Major matters of state, including the enthronement and deposition of khans, and declarations of war and peace, were decided at assemblies of the nobility (kurultai).

Sources for the history of the khanate are scarce. No document of the khanate survived the Russian conquest, and the records of the early Russian colonial administration, the Prikaz Kazanskogo Dvortsa, were destroyed during the Time of Troubles.

=== Early history ===
During the reign of Ulugh Muhammad and his son Maxmud, Kazan forces raided Muscovy and its subject lands several times. In 1445 Maxmud and his brother Yakub defeated the army of Vasily II of Moscow near Suzdal and captured him. Vasily agreed to pay a large ransom and an annual tribute.

In July 1487, Grand Duke Ivan III of Moscow occupied Kazan and placed Möxämmädämin on the Kazan throne. During Möxämmädämin's reign (1487–1495), the khanate was in effect a Muscovite protectorate and followed a foreign policy shared with Moscow. In 1496, a conspiracy of the nobility, supported mainly by the Nogais and the Siberian Tatars, placed the Siberian Genghisid Mamuk on the throne, but he could not hold Kazan. Möxämmädämin returned in 1502, and in 1505 he broke with Moscow: he arrested the Russian envoy and imprisoned Russian merchants.

In 1521, with the support of his mother Nur Sultan, the Crimean prince Sahib Giray took the Kazan throne. Relying on an alliance with Crimea, he began military action against Russia, and in 1521 he led a successful campaign against Moscow. The campaign coincided with an attack on Moscow by his brother, the Crimean khan Mehmed I Giray.

=== Final decade ===
Map of the Khanate of Kazan, 1540s

The growth of Crimean influence displeased the pro-Moscow elements in Kazan. Some of these noblemen started the Kazan uprising of 1545–1546, and in early January 1546 they deposed Safa Giray and killed much of his Crimean entourage. A Moscow supporter, Şahğäli, took the throne. From 1545 Moscow organized a series of campaigns against Kazan, including those of February–March 1547 and January–February 1548, but Safa Giray kept power.

Safa Giray fled to the Nogai ruler Yusuf, obtained troops from him, returned to Kazan, and overthrew Şahğäli. The leaders of the uprising were executed, and 75 Kazan nobles entered the service of Ivan IV. Safa Giray died in an accident in early March 1549, and his two-year-old son Ütämeşgäräy became khan. His mother Söyembikä acted as regent and relied on the Crimean guard led by the oğlan Qoşçaq.

At that time Safa Giray's relatives (including Devlet I Giray) were in Crimea. A large part of the local nobility opposed inviting them to the throne of Kazan. Under Qoşçaq's government relations with Russia continued to worsen. In 1551 Söyembikä tried to flee with her son to the Nogai Horde but was captured. Qoşçaq and his men were executed, and Söyembikä and Ütämeşgäräy were sent to Moscow. The Kazan nobility accepted Russian terms, which included the transfer of the lands west of the Volga (Taw yağı) to Russia and the accession of Şahğäli, who began his third reign.

Şahğäli left Kazan on 6 March 1552. An anti-Moscow uprising led by emirs and the sayyid Qolşärif expelled the Russian garrison. The Astrakhan Genghisid Yadegar Mokhammad became khan.

=== Downfall ===
In 1552, forces of Ivan the Terrible, operating from the Russian fortress of Sviyazhsk, built in 1551, laid siege to Kazan. The Russians defeated the Tatar inland troops and burnt Archa and some castles. After a siege of more than 40 days, the Russians blew up the walls near the Atalyk and Nogai gates and stormed the city on 2 October 1552 (Old Style; 12 October New Style). Yadegar Mokhammad was captured and taken to Moscow. Some defenders escaped, but most were killed, and the population was massacred.

After the fall of Kazan, territories such as Udmurtia and Bashkortostan joined Russia without a conflict. The administration of the khanate was wiped out; pro-Moscow and neutral nobles kept their lands, but others were executed. Tatars were then resettled far away from rivers, roads and Kazan. Free lands were settled by Russians and sometimes by pro-Russian Tatars. Orthodox clergy such as Germogen forcibly baptized many Tatars.

=== Resistance ===
Part of the population continued to resist Russian rule. The Mari invited a Nogai prince, whom the chronicle calls Akhpolbey; since Khudyakov, historians have often identified him as Ali-Akram, a brother of Söyembikä, which the History of the Tatars regards as an error. The Kazan voivode P. V. Morozov later took and burnt the town of Chalym, the rebels' center. The Mari stopped resisting in May 1557. Rebel governments were also formed in Mishatamaq.

By some estimates, the population of the former khanate declined by several thousand during the wars. The territory of the khanate was placed under the Prikaz of the Kazan Palace, a Russian government office, which undertook the forced Russification and Christianization of the Tatars and other peoples. The term Tsardom of Kazan was in use until 1708, when the Kazan Governorate was formed.

== Economics ==
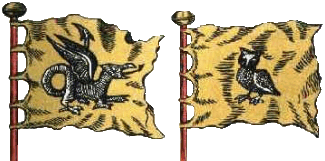
It is unclear whether the khanate had its own flag. The Dutchman Carlus (Carel) Allard wrote that the Caesar of Tataria used two flags, and that the first showed the Zilant.

The urban population worked in crafts, including pottery, woodworking, leatherworking, ironworking, arms-making, weaving, and jewelry. The main towns included Qazan, Alabuğa, Arça, Bolğar, Cükätaw, Qaşan, İske Qazan, Çallı, Alat, Cöri, and Täteş. The khanate traded locally with the upper Kama region and the southern Urals, and internationally with Russia, Central Asia, and the Caucasus. Its main exports were furs, leather goods, honey, and grain; its imports included luxury goods, expensive weapons, textiles, and spices. Slaves were also exported. The khanate minted no coins of its own and mainly used Russian coins. In spring 1525, at Russian insistence, Safa Giray agreed to move the trade fair from Kazan to Nizhny Novgorod. The Taşayaq fair in Kazan was considered the main fair of the Volga region, and an annual fair, moved in the 15th century from Bolghar, was held on Gostiny Island in the Volga near Kazan. A landholder who held a hereditary estate in return for service had the title söyurğal or tarkhan.

== Society ==
The population of the khanate was multiethnic, and comprised the following peoples: Tatars ("Kazanliyar", "Kazan Tatars"), Chuvash, Mari (Cheremis), Mordvins, Udmurts (Votyaks, Ary), and Bashkirs.

The khan was formally the sole ruler, but real power belonged to the diwan, an assembly of the highest religious and secular aristocracy. The military service nobility included the uğlans, bäks (begs), ämirs (emirs), morzas, and Cossacks. The knightly class, the çura, comprised the bahadirs and Cossacks; the term meant military servants, not serfs. Muslim clergy also played a major role. The head of the clergy was the säyet (sayyid). Şäyexs (sheikhs), qazís (qadis), mullahs, imams, and hafizes led worship and also judged civil cases. A madrasa stood at the cathedral mosque in Kazan, and there were many other madrasas and maktabs.

The tax-paying class, the qara xalıq ("black people"), comprised state peasants, dependent people, and prisoners of war (qollar). Most of the Muslim population were subjects of the state; only a small part was held by the nobility. The main taxes and duties were the yasaq and others; Muslims also paid gošur and zakat, and non-Muslims paid the jizya. The khan and the Tatar lords held many prisoners of war as slaves. According to the Chuvash encyclopedia, 100,000 Russian captives were held in the khanate between the 1520s and the 1540s. Landowners settled prisoner-slaves on their estates to work the land; when Russian slaves were freed in 1551, about 60,000 people returned home according to official figures. Captives, especially women, were the main object of the slave trade and were sold to harems in the lands around the Caspian Sea. Sigismund von Herberstein wrote that in 1521 Sahib Giray sold all the captives he had taken from Muscovy to Tatars at the market in Astrakhan.

== Administration and military ==
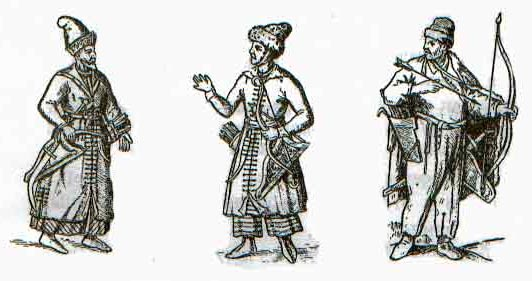
Tatar soldiers

The khanate was divided into large districts, the daruğas. Sources differ on their number. The 2008 Great Russian Encyclopedia lists five: Alat, Arça, Gäreç (Galich), Cöri, and Nuğay, the last created in the 1540s–1550s. The Tatar encyclopedia gives four at first, with the Nogai daruğa added later, and the Chuvash encyclopedia gives six or seven, each governed by an emir. Some feudal lords asserted independence from Kazan at times, but such attempts were suppressed.

The army was made up of levies from the daruğas and towns, the personal troops of the khan and the nobility, and allied troops. Estimates of its size differ: the Tatar encyclopedia gives 30,000 to 50,000 men, and the Chuvash encyclopedia gives up to 60,000. Firearms were used in field battles and in the defense of fortifications. The barrel of a 16th-century hand firearm (pishchal) has been excavated in Kazan, and Russian sources record the defenders firing cannon, handguns, and bows from the city walls.

== Culture ==
Khudyakov described the khanate as formed from two elements: an older Bulgar base, with its population and culture, and a Tatar element that brought the state organization. Cultural elements of the Golden Horde were also present among the nobility.

Literacy among the Tatars was fairly widespread, because every village with a mosque also had a school. Inscriptions on surviving household objects and gravestones give evidence of literacy. There was a large madrasa and library at the cathedral mosque in Kazan, and many madrasas had manuscript libraries. Kazan became a center of science and theology.

Although Islamic influence predominated, lay literature also developed. Known Old Tatar poets and writers include Möxämmädyar, Qolşärif, Möxämmädämin, and Ğärifbäk. The History of the Tatars calls Möxämmädyar the great poet of the Kazan Khanate.

By the time of the khanate the city of Bolghar was in ruins, but it became a religious and educational center and a place of pilgrimage for the khanate's Muslims.

Building and architecture, including white-stone architecture, reached a high level, as did stone carving.

== See also ==
- Islam in Tatarstan
- Bulgarian epigraphic monuments
- Ar begs
- List of Sunni Muslim dynasties
- Bibliography of Russian history
