= Vyatka Land =

Historical region in Russia

Vyatka Land Вятская земля
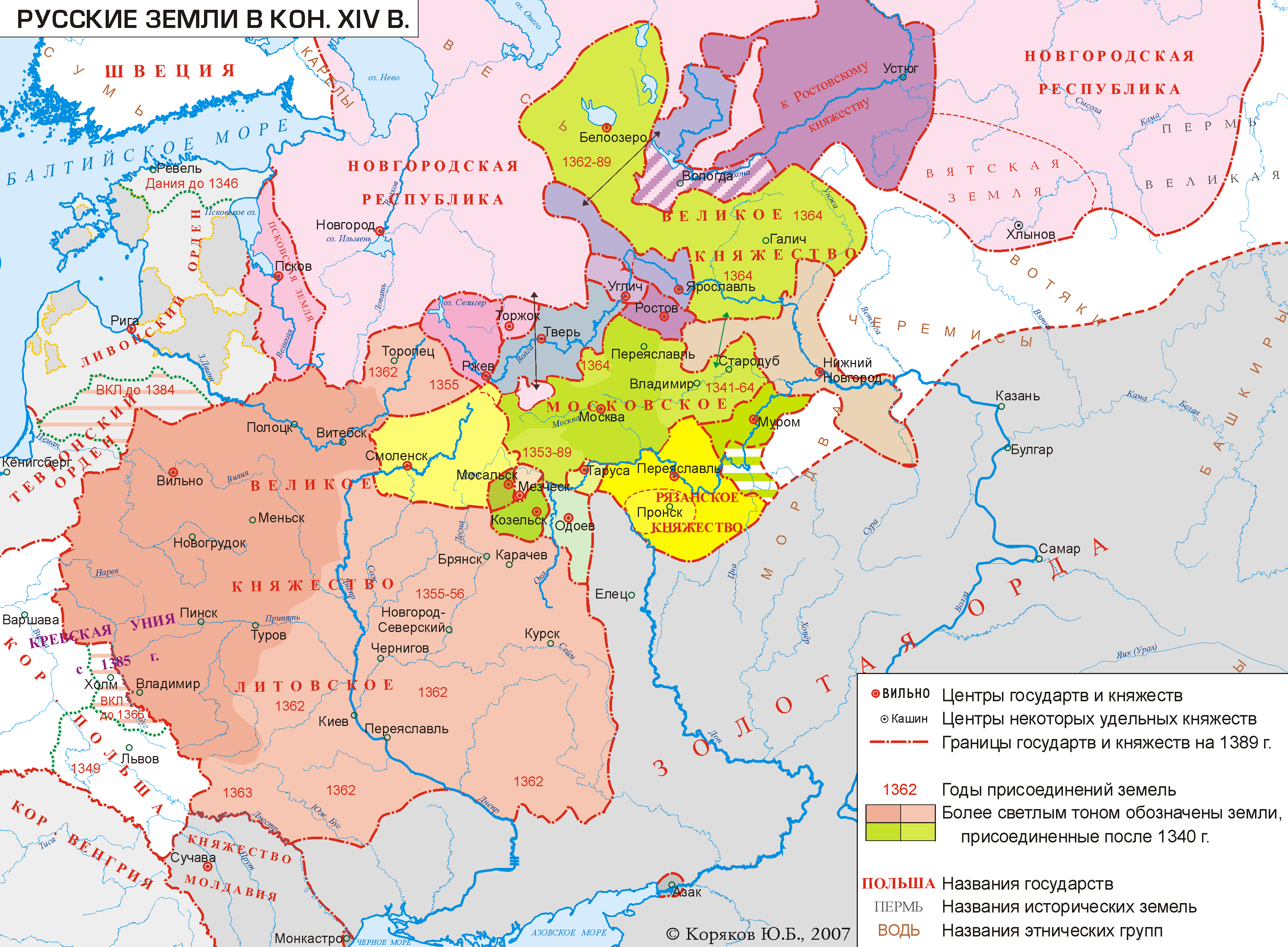
- Grand Duchy of Lithuania and Russian states in 1389 (in Russian)
- Today part of: Kirov Oblast

Vyatka Land (Russian: Вятская земля), or simply Vyatka (Russian: Вятка), is a historical region in the basin of the Vyatka River, approximately corresponding to modern-day Kirov Oblast in Russia.

While the Permians were its original inhabitants, it was gradually settled by Russian settlers, whose arrival is traditionally dated to the late 12th century. Vyatka Land, being geographically isolated from the rest of the Russian lands, sometimes accepted the suzerainty of other Russian states, but enjoyed a large degree of de facto independence until it was annexed by the Grand Principality of Moscow in 1489.

== History ==
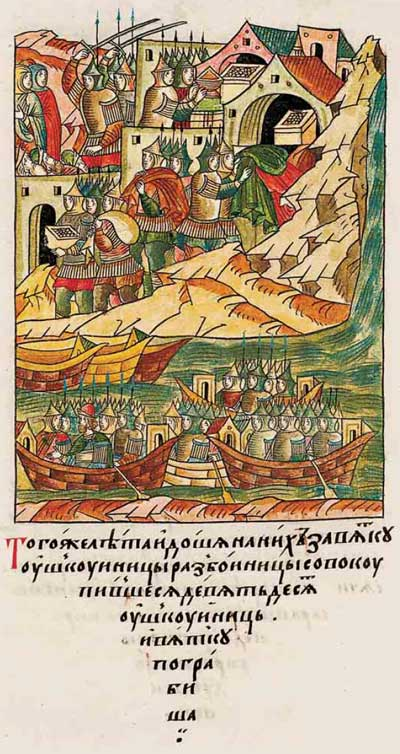
Ushkuyniki raiding Vyatka in 1382, miniature from the Illustrated Chronicle of Ivan the Terrible (16th century)

Udmurts inhabited Vyatka Land before the arrival of Russian settlers from Novgorod or Vladimir-Suzdal. According to the Legend of the Vyatka Land, they came from Novgorod in 1174, conquered Kotelnich and Nikulitsyn with the supernatural help of saints Boris and Gleb, and founded Khlynov (now Kirov), which became the main settlement of Vyatka Land. This account was disputed by some historians who consider the Legend to be a much later and unreliable source. The settlement appears in the archaeological record of the 11th–13th centuries and intensifies after the Mongol conquest. The first undisputed mention of Vyatka in Russian chronicles dates to 1374, when a band of ushkuyniki (pirates) from Vyatka raided Sarai. According to an Udmurt legend, the Udmurts who lived in the settlement on the site of future Vyatka burned down their sanctuary and migrated east to the Cheptsa River.

Around 1383, it was annexed by Dmitry Konstantinovich of Nizhny Novgorod-Suzdal. It remained dependent on Nizhny Novgorod-Suzdal in principle until 1393 and in fact until 1402. However, the Tatar prince Bektut launched a military expedition to Vyatka in 1391. Some of the inhabitants were killed and others captured, with Vyatka joining the rest of the Russian lands that had already fallen under Tatar suzerainty. Following the annexation of Nizhny Novgorod-Suzdal by Moscow, the Suzdalian prince Semyon Dmitriyevich continued the struggle against Moscow and gained military support from the Tatars before he was exiled to Vyatka, where he died in December 1401. There was a rivalry between Vyatka and Ustyug which led to several battles fought in the late 14th and early 15th centuries.

In 1402–1403, Grand Prince Vasily I of Moscow acquired Vyatka Land from the Suzdalian line of princes and handed it to his brother Yury as an appanage principality, together with Galich. Yury lived in the latter and sent a deputy to Vyatka. He fortified Khlynov (Vyatka), Kotelnich and Orlov and thereafter they were considered towns (goroda). Vyatka supported Yury and his son Dmitry Shemyaka against Vasily II in the Muscovite Civil War. Jonah, the head of the Russian Orthodox Church, accused the people of Vyatka (vyatchane) of cruelty, destroying churches and selling captives into slavery in 1452. By that time the war had ended in victory for Vasily II and he subsequently organised several campaigns to subdue Vyatka. The first two were unsuccessful – the Muscovite generals were reportedly bribed off – and only the third one launched in 1459 succeeded. The Muscovite army took Kotelnich and Orlov and besieged Vyatka until it surrendered. It accepted the suzerainty of Moscow and was forced to pay tribute. The residents "gave their lowered foreheads" to the grand prince "to do as he will". However, Vyatka continued to experience conflict between local boyars (nobles) and merchants with separatist tendencies, and factions that supported unification with Moscow.

Vyatka remained semi-independent even after formally accepting the suzerainty of the grand prince of Moscow. They fought together with other Muscovite forces against the Kazan Khanate in 1468; however, then khan Ibrahim of Kazan sent his troops to Vyatka and extracted a promise not to help Moscow against Kazan. When Ivan III gathered forces to attack Kazan in the following year, Vyatka refused to join the army, citing the promise to Ibrahim. In 1485, only a show of force made Vyatka join another Muscovite campaign against Kazan. The vyatchane raided both Tatar and Russian lands: in 1471, they looted Sarai, and in the 1480s, they twice attacked Muscovite lands on the Northern Dvina.

Ivan III subjugated the lands of Perm in 1472, annexed Novgorod in 1478, and installed a pro-Russian khan after capturing Kazan in 1487. Ivan then sent an army to subdue Vyatka in 1489, under the command of Daniil Shchenya. Kotelnich and Orlov were taken without resistance. Khlynov was besieged on August 16. Khlynov notables presented gifts to the Muscovite generals and offered obedience to the grand prince. The generals demanded they hand over three atamans. This was debated for two days in the city and ultimately the vyatchane refused the demand. The Muscovite army started siege preparations, which caused Khlynov to surrender. The three atamans were beheaded in Moscow, the Vyatka nobles were resettled on the southern border of Muscovy and the merchants were resettled in Dmitrov. The all-Russian system of administration was expanded to Vyatka with the appointment of local officials known as namestniki. The term Vyatka Land remained in official use until the 17th–18th centuries.

The scarcity of information on Vyatka led Nikolay Kostomarov to remark that "there is nothing in Russian history more obscure than the fortunes of Viatka and its region".

== Government ==
Vyatka Land was self-governed to a large degree; however, the nature of its government is not known for sure. The local leaders, known as voivodes (Russian: земские воеводы, romanised: zemskiye voyevody), were apparently elected and sometimes they are identified with atamans who headed military campaigns and raids. There are no explicit mentions of a veche (popular assembly) in Vyatka in surviving sources, and historians' opinions on its existence differ. Nikolay Kostomarov and some post-Soviet historians believed that it was the highest authority in Vyatka while Soviet historians argued that there is no proof of its existence.

== Population ==
A Vyatka republic was formed in the late 14th century following an influx of Russian peasants. It had a mixed population consisting of Russians, Udmurts and Besermyans. The Russian population grew over time, and after Moscow's annexation of the region in 1489, the local Russian elite was deported.

== Sources ==
- Auty, Robert; Obolensky, Dimitri (1976). An Introduction to Russian History. Cambridge University Press. ISBN 978-0-521-28038-9.
- Berdinskikh, V. A.; Tatarenkova, L. S., eds. (1995). Энциклопедия земли Вятской. Т. 4: История (in Russian). Городская газета. ISBN 5-86645-010-0.
- Chew, Allen F. (1 January 1970). An Atlas of Russian History: Eleven Centuries of Changing Borders. Yale University Press. ISBN 978-0-300-01445-7.
- Feldbrugge, Ferdinand J.M. (2017). A History of Russian Law: From Ancient Times to the Council Code (Ulozhenie) of Tsar Aleksei Mikhailovich of 1649. BRILL. ISBN 9789004352148.
- Kashtanov, S. M (1986). "Viatka Land". In Wieczynski, Joseph L. (ed.). The Modern Encyclopedia of Russian and Soviet History. Vol. 42. Gulf Breeze: Academic International Press. pp. 74–75. ISBN 0875690645.
- Kostomarov, Nikolai Ivanovich (1868). Исторія Новгорода, Пскова и Вятки во время удѣльно-вѣчеваго уклада (in Russian). С.-Петербургъ: Типографія В. С. Эттингера.
- Luppov, P. N. (1958). История города Вятки (in Russian). Кировское книжное издательство.
- Kropotkin, Peter Alexeivitch; Bealby, John Thomas (1911). "Vyatka (government)" . Encyclopædia Britannica. Vol. 28 (11th ed.). p. 222.
- Presnyakov, Aleksandr E. (1970). Rieber, Alfred J. (ed.). The Formation of the Great Russian State: A Study of Russian History in the Thirteenth to Fifteenth Centuries. Translated by Moorhouse, A.E. Quadrangle Books. ISBN 9781131812656.
- Seleznyov, Yury Vasilyevich (2009). "Бектут (Бек-Тут)". Элита Золотой Орды. Научно-справочное издание. Kazan: Фэн. p. 54. ISBN 978-5-9690-0068-1.
- Shaikhutdinov, Marat (23 November 2021). Between East and West: The Formation of the Moscow State. Academic Studies Press. ISBN 978-1-64469-715-3.
- Taagepera, Rein (26 November 2013). The Finno-Ugric Republics and the Russian State. Routledge. ISBN 978-1-136-67808-0.
- Tikhonov, A. N. (2007). "К вопросу о вече в Вятской земле XIV-XV веков". Материальная и духовная культура народов Урала и Поволжья: история и современность: Мат-лы Междунар. науч.-практ. конференции, посв. 450-летию вхождения удмуртского народа в состав Российского государства (in Russian). Глазовский гос. педагогический институт. pp. 53–56. ISBN 978-5-93008-105-3.
- Tikhonov, A. N. (2008). "Спор о народоправстве: вопрос о политическом строе Вятской земли XIV – XV вв. в советской и новейшей историографии". Россия в XX веке, общество и власть: проблемы региональной истории, историографии и источниковедения: Мат-лы межвуз. науч.-практ. конф. 12 дек. 2007 г (in Russian). Полиграфцентр ННГАСУ. pp. 22–28. ISBN 978-5-87941-521-6.
