= Dmitry Krasny =

Russian nobleman, died 1440

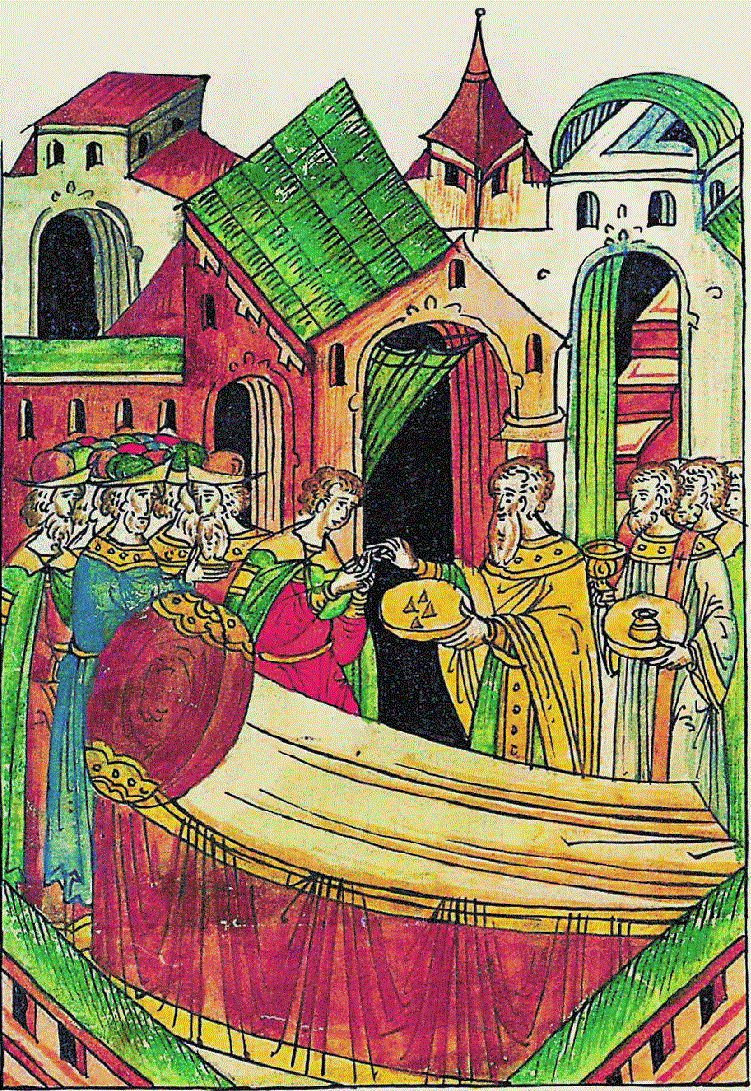
Prince Dmitry Krasny takes the sacrament while being terminally ill (miniature of the Facial Chronicle))

Dmitriy Yurievich Krasny (Russian: Дмитрий Юрьевич Красный; died September 22, 1440) was a Russian nobleman, the youngest son of Yury of Zvenigorod and Anastasia of Smolensk, and grandson of Dmitry Donskoy. He was the appanage prince of Galich-Mersky and took part in the Great Feudal War. The strange circumstances of his death are described in chronicles with many details and cause speculation about possible poisoning.

== Biography ==
=== Family ===
Dmitry's father was Yury of Zvenigorod, the son of the hero of the Battle of Kulikovo, Dmitry Donskoy. According to the old testament of Dmitry Donskoy, written when his eldest son Vasily I had no children, Yury was to receive the throne of the Grand Duchy. After the birth of the grandson of Dmitry Donskoy, Vasily II, the issue was not finally resolved, which led to a confrontation between the uncle (Yury of Zvenigorod) and nephew (Vasily II). The sons of Yury were also involved in this struggle for power.

The exact date of birth of Dmitry Krasny is unknown. The first time he was mentioned in the title of a treaty of 1427/1428, that was not preserved (only an inventory is known), as Dmitry Menshoy (i.e. junior in relation to the older brother, Dmitry Shemyaka). Since his mother Anastasia died in 1422, he was born earlier. The author of the biography of his father believed that Dmitry Krasny was born in 1421, but known historian Zimin suggested that at 1425 (when Yury start the open struggle for power) he had "four young, but already independent sons at the age of 20-24". Despite the fact that only three sons of Yuri Zvenigorodsky are widely known, there are serious reasons to assume that he had another son, Ivan Yuryevich. The later went to a monastery under the name of the monk Ignatius and died in 1432. However, a study of the remains of the older brother (Dmitry Shemyaka) showed that he was most likely born around 1413 (at the time of his death in 1453, he was about 40 years old). Thus, Dmitry Krasny could be born in 1414–1422.

=== Great Feudal War ===
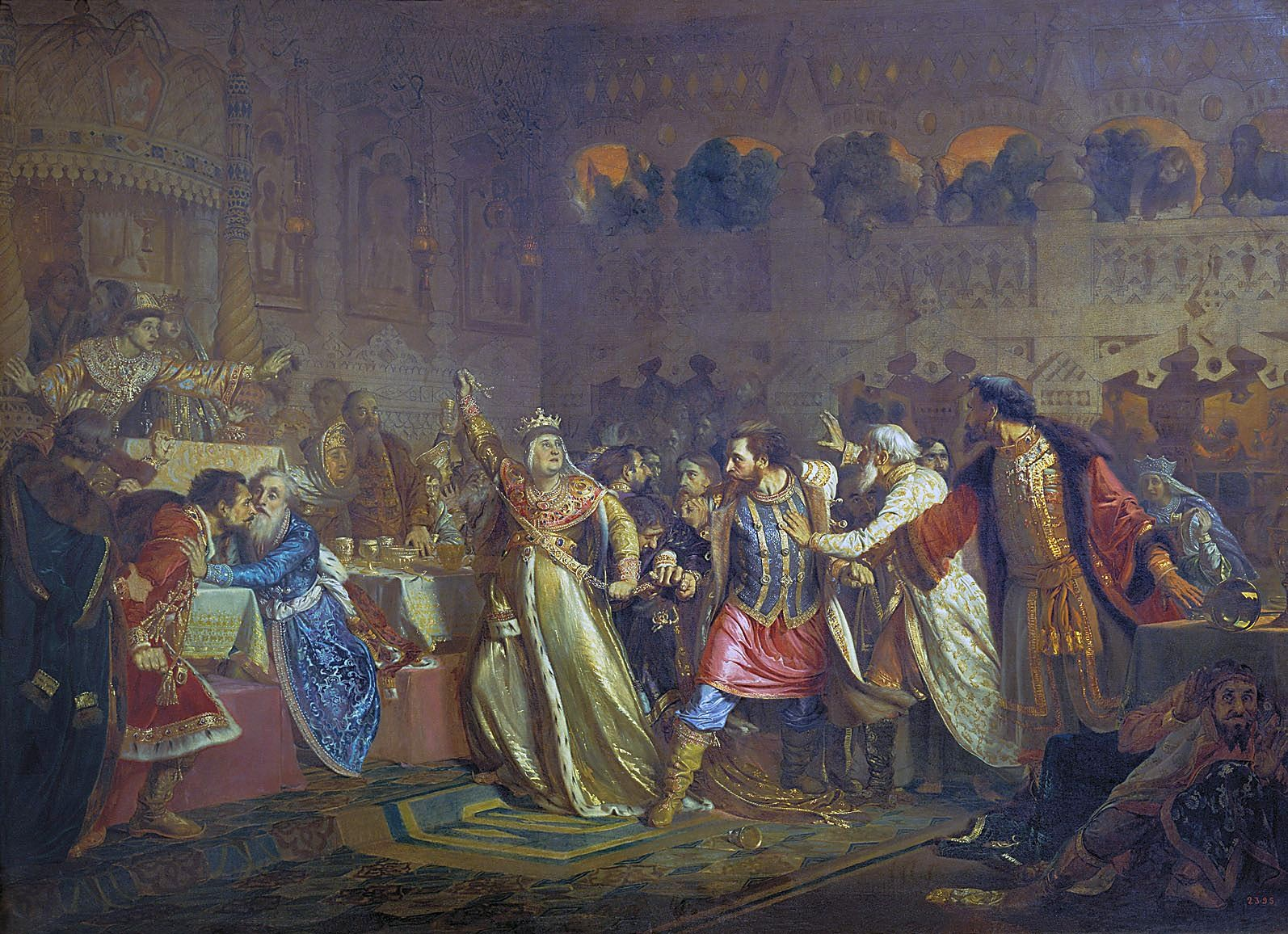
Sophia of Lithuania pulls the belt from Vasily Kosoy during a wedding feast at 1433. Painting by Pavel Chistyakov.

After the death of Vasily I in 1425, Yury Zvenigorodsky began to struggle for power with his nephew Vasily II. However, at first both sides avoided an open clash (Metropolitan Photius did much to reconcile his relatives). One treaty (or draft of the treaty) between Vasily and Yury with his son Dmitry Menshoy (Krasny) dates back to 1427/1428. Historians note that in this case the elder brothers of Dmitry Krasny were not mentioned, which may indicate their independent role or even the beginning of the confrontation with their father. At the famous feast in 1433, when a quarrel over the belt occurred, only older brothers were present again; thus, the father and youngest son (Dmitry Krasny) were opposed to them at that time. But now the offended elder sons went to Galich and teamed up with their father. The combined forces defeated Vasily and so Yury, according to the testament of Dmitry Donskoy, sent Vasily to reign in Kolomna. However, Kosoy and Shemyaka were not satisfied; they killed boyar Morozov, the initiator of the peace agreement with Vasily, and left Moscow. The position of Yury became fragile and he soon abandoned Moscow. In 1433, a new treaty was signed between Vasily and Yurн together with Dmitry Krasny. In it, as a separate paragraph, Yury and Dmitry Krasny pledged not to help Kosoy ana Shemyaka. Historian Zimin suggests that the agreement implied a joint struggle against the eldest sons of Yuri. Under the agreement, Dmitry Krasny got Bezhetsky Verkh from Vasily. Thus, Dmitry Krasny continued to follow his father's moderate policies, while his older brothers were more radical.

In 1434 an open clash happened and the combined forces of Yury with his sons prevailed over Vasily II. The Vologda-Perm chronicle noted that Dmitry Krasny participated in the father's march on Moscow. Yury sat on the throne of the Grand Duchy in Moscow, and two Dmitry (Shemyaka and Krasny) were sent in pursuit of Vasily II. But along the way, the word got round that their father had died (he was at the head of the state only for two months), and Vasily Kosoy, the eldest of the brothers, declared himself ruler. This was a complete violation of all laws of succession: both majorat and agnatic seniority. (Note: After the death of Yury, the last of the sons of Dmitry Donskoy, Vasily II (the eldest son of the eldest son of Donskoy) became the head of the clan of Moscow princes. Yury had the right to the throne according to the old principle of agnatic seniority, but, according to the same law, now Vasily II, and not Vasily Kosoy, should have become the new Grand Prince.) Two Dmitry did not recognize the claims of their older brother and went over to the side of Vasily.

Under an agreement with Vasily II, Dmitry Krasny received the important cities of Galich and Vyshgorod (according to the will of his father, Yury of Zvenigorod) and also Bezhetsky Verkh. In the war of two Vasily in 1434–1436, he did not take a noticeable part, although the military campaigns of Vasily Kosoy affected his lands. Zimin characterizes the behavior of Dmitry Krasny at this time as "lacking initiative". However, in the decisive battle near Skoryatin, Dmitry Krasny fought along with Vasily II against his older brother.

=== Death ===
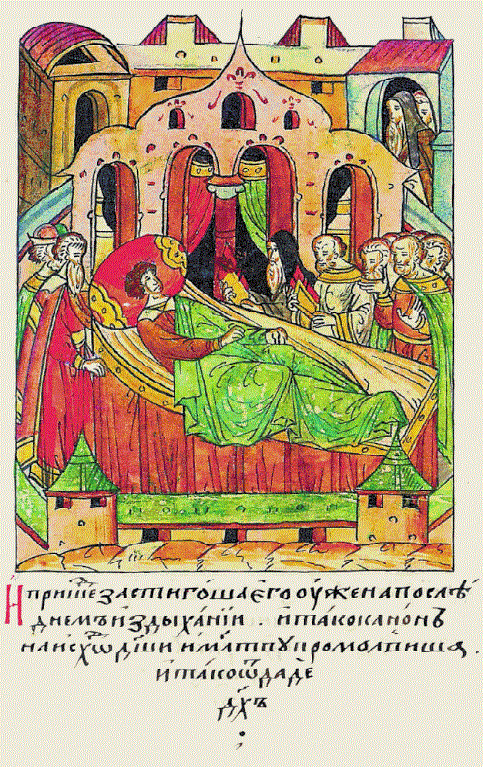
Death of Dmitry Krasniy

After the final defeat of Vasily Kosoy in 1436, Vasily II concluded a new treaty with the senior Dmitry (Shemyaka). Vasily II took the possessions of the rebel prince, but the inheritance of a died son of Dmitry Donskoy, Konstantin, remained in the domain of Dmitry Shemyaka and Dmitry Krasny. These were the cities of Rzhev and Uglich, as well as part of Moscow. Two brothers owned them together and Vasily II promised not to interfere in the management of these possessions. In 1437, two Dmitry commanded a large army, sent by Vasily II against the exiled Khan Ulugh Muhammad. This campaign was ended in a catastrophic defeat at the Battle of Belyov. In 1439 Ulugh Muhammad, who settled in Kazan, struck back; he plundered the outskirts of Moscow and burned Kolomna. Dmitry Shemyaka did not send his troops, which sharply worsened his relationship with Vasily II. Dmitry Krasny, by contrast, became governor in Moscow during the absence of Vasily II.

In the fall of 1440 (Note: Tatyana Panova believes that he died in 1441. In old Russian chronicles Anno Mundi chronology was used and an exact recount into Anno Domini is not always possible) Dmitry Krasny, still a young man, suddenly died in his inheritance Bezhetsky Verkh. The description of his death in the chronicle is uniquely in-depth and emotional, with many details. At first he was sick for a long time, he could not eat, lost sleep and even seemed to go deaf. On Sunday, 18 September he was able to take the sacrament, although he was bleeding from his nose and through the pores on his skin. After the sacrament, for a short time he felt better, he was able to eat a little. At night, his condition worsened, it even seemed to others that he had already died. However, he suddenly came to life and the next two days he read out loud prayers and sang psalms but talked with people around him off the mark. This delusional state ended on Wednesday, and the next day, September 22, Dmitry Krasny died. The body was brought to Moscow only on October 14, and when they opened the temporary coffin to move the body to a stone tomb, it did not show any signs of decay, "his face was white as that of a sleeping man". He was buried in the same grave with his father Yury of Zvenigorod in Cathedral of the Archangel.

Tatyana Panova, author of the book "Poisons in the struggle for power. Russia. XI - beginning of the XVII century", suggests that Dmitry Krasny was poisoned by arsenic. In her opinion, this is indicated by both a description of his decease and too good preservation of the body. However, the burial itself remains unstudied. As the commissioner of the murder, she points to Vasily II.

== Heritage ==
Nothing is known about his wife or children. Dmitry Shemyaka at first considered all the inheritance of the deceased brother to be his own. So, he transferred one village near Bezhetsky Verkh to the Trinity Monastery "for the soul" of Dmitry Krasny. In 1441–1442, Vasily II waged a war against Dmitry Shemyaka. The Abbot of the Trinity Monastery reconciled them, and Shemyaka received Galich and Vyshgorod (possessions of Dmitry Krasny under an agreement in 1434), but now Vasily II was in charge of the Bezhetsky Verkh.

Dmitry Krasny was glorified as a "faithful prince" by the Russian Orthodox Church, but at the beginning of the 20th century he was forgotten. Professor Golubinsky included him in the "List of the deceased, who are not really commemorated".

== Sources ==
- Kovalyov-Sluchevsky, Konstantin (2008). Юрий Звенигородский. Великий князь Московский [Yury of Zvenigorod. Grand Prince of Moscow] (in Russian). Moscow: Молодая гвардия. ISBN 978-5-235-03159-3.
- Zimin, Aleksandr (1991). Витязь на распутье. Феодальная война в России XV в. [The Knight at the Crossroads. The feudal war in Russia of the 15th century] (in Russian). Moscow: Мысль. ISBN 5-244-00518-9.
- Nazarov V. D. "ДМИ́ТРИЙ Ю́РЬЕВИЧ". Большая Российская энциклопедия - электронная версия (in Russian).
- Bobrov, A. G. (2014). Великий князь Дмитрий Юрьевич Шемяка в древнерусской литературе и книжности. Труды отдела древнерусской литературы (in Russian). 63: 516–540.
- Panova, T. D. (2017). Яды в борьбе за власть [Poisons in the struggle for power. Russia. XI - beginning of the XVII century] (in Russian). Moscow. pp. 33–44. ISBN 978-5-906454-73-7.
