= List of heirs to the Russian throne =

This is a list of the individuals who were, at any given time, considered the next in line to inherit the throne of Russia or Grand Prince of Moscow. Those who actually succeeded (at any future time) are shown in bold. Stillborn children and infants surviving less than a month are not included.

== 1281 to 1547 ==
At this time the ruler is known as Grand Prince of Moscow.

Heir	Status	Relationship to Monarch	Became heir	Reason	Ceased to be heir	Reason	Next in line	Monarch
**Yury Danilovich**	Heir apparent	eldest son	1281	born	4 March 1303	became Grand Prince	**Ivan Danilovich**; 1288–1303, brother	Daniel
**Ivan Danilovich**	Heir presumptive	brother	4 March 1303	brother became Grand Prince	21 November 1325	became Grand Prince	uncertain	Yury
**Ivan Danilovich**	Heir presumptive	brother	4 March 1303	brother became Grand Prince	21 November 1325	became Grand Prince	**Simeon Ivanovich**; 1316–1325, son	Yury
**Simeon Ivanovich**	Heir apparent	eldest son	21 November 1325	father became Grand Prince	31 March 1340	became Grand Prince	**Ivan Ivanovich**; 1325–1340, brother	Ivan I
**Ivan Ivanovich**	Heir presumptive	brother	31 March 1340	brother became Grand Prince	1348	son born to Grand Prince	uncertain	Simeon
Ivan Simeonovich	Heir apparent	eldest son	1349	born	1353	died	**Ivan Ivanovich**; 1349–c. 1350, uncle	Simeon
Ivan Simeonovich	Heir apparent	eldest son	1349	born	1353	died	XX Simeonovich c. 1350–1353, brother	Simeon
**Ivan Ivanovich**	Heir presumptive	brother	1353	death of Grand Prince's sons	27 April 1353	became Grand Prince	Dmitry Ivanovich; 1353, son	Simeon
**Dmitry Ivanovich**	Heir apparent	eldest son	27 April 1353	father became Grand Prince	13 November 1359	became Grand Prince	uncertain	Ivan II
**Dmitry Ivanovich**	Heir apparent	eldest son	27 April 1353	father became Grand Prince	13 November 1359	became Grand Prince	Ivan Ivanovich c. 1356–1359, brother	Ivan II
Ivan Ivanovich	Heir presumptive	brother	13 November 1359	brother became Grand Prince	1364	died	Vladimir Andreyevich; 1359–1364, cousin	Dmitry Donskoy
Vladimir Andreyevich	Heir presumptive	cousin	1364	death of Grand Prince's brother	c. 1370	son born to Grand Prince	uncertain	Dmitry Donskoy
Daniil Dmitrievich	Heir apparent	eldest son	c. 1370	born	15 September 1379	died	Vladimir Andreyevich; 1370–1371, father's cousin	Dmitry Donskoy
Daniil Dmitrievich	Heir apparent	eldest son	c. 1370	born	15 September 1379	died	**Vasily Dmitrievich**; 1371–1379, brother	Dmitry Donskoy
**Vasily Dmitrievich**	Heir apparent	eldest son	15 September 1379	brother died	19 May 1389	became Grand Prince	**Yury Dmitrievich**; 1379–1389, brother	Dmitry Donskoy
**Yury Dmitrievich**	Heir presumptive	brother	19 May 1389	brother became Grand Prince	30 March 1395	son born to Grand Prince	Andrey Dmitrievich; 1389–1395, brother	Vasily I
Yury Vasilievich	Heir apparent	eldest son	30 March 1395	born	30 November 1400	died	**Yury Dmitrievich**; 1395–1396, uncle	Vasily I
Yury Vasilievich	Heir apparent	eldest son	30 March 1395	born	30 November 1400	died	Ivan Vasilievich; 1396–1400, brother	Vasily I
Ivan Vasilievich	Heir apparent	eldest son	30 November 1400	brother died	20 July 1417	died	**Yury Dmitrievich**; 1400, uncle	Vasily I
Ivan Vasilievich	Heir apparent	eldest son	30 November 1400	brother died	20 July 1417	died	Daniel Vasilievich; 1400–1402, brother	Vasily I
Ivan Vasilievich	Heir apparent	eldest son	30 November 1400	brother died	20 July 1417	died	**Yury Dmitrievich**; 1402–1415, uncle	Vasily I
Ivan Vasilievich	Heir apparent	eldest son	30 November 1400	brother died	20 July 1417	died	**Vasily Vasilievich**; 1415–1417, brother	Vasily I
**Vasily Vasilievich**	Heir apparent	eldest son	20 July 1417	brother died	27 February 1425	became Grand Prince	**Yury Dmitrievich**; 1417–1425, uncle	Vasily I
**Yury Dmitrievich**	Heir presumptive	uncle	27 February 1425	nephew became Grand Prince	1433	seized the throne	**Vasily Yurievich Kosoy**; 1425–1433, son	Vasily II

Heir	Status	Relationship to Monarch	Became heir	Reason	Ceased to be heir	Reason	Next in line	Monarch
**Vasily Kosoy**	Heir apparent	eldest son	1433	father became Grand Prince	5 June 1434	became Grand Prince	**Dmitry Yurievich**; 1433–1434, brother	Yury II Dmitrievich
**Dmitry Yurievich**	Heir presumptive	brother	5 June 1434	brother became Grand Prince	1435	Grand Prince deposed by his cousin	uncertain	Vasily Kosoy

Heir	Status	Relationship to Monarch	Became heir	Reason	Ceased to be heir	Reason	Next in line	Monarch
succession uncertain 1435–1440								Vasily II
**Ivan Vasilievich**	Heir apparent	eldest son	22 January 1440	born	1446	Grand Prince deposed	uncertain	Vasily II
**Ivan Vasilievich**	Heir apparent	eldest son	1447	father returned to throne	27 March 1462	became Grand Prince	Andrey Vasilievich Bolshoy; 1447–1458, brother	Vasily II
**Ivan Vasilievich**	Heir apparent	eldest son	1447	father returned to throne	27 March 1462	became Grand Prince	Ivan Ivanovich; 1458–1462, son	Vasily II
Ivan Ivanovich	Heir apparent	eldest son	27 March 1462	father became Grand Prince	6 March 1490	died	Andrey Vasilievich Bolshoy; 1462–1479, uncle	Ivan III
Ivan Ivanovich	Heir apparent	eldest son	27 March 1462	father became Grand Prince	6 March 1490	died	**Vasily Ivanovich**; 1479–1483, half-brother	Ivan III
Ivan Ivanovich	Heir apparent	eldest son	27 March 1462	father became Grand Prince	6 March 1490	died	Dmitry Ivanovich; 1483–1490, son	Ivan III
Dmitry Ivanovich	Heir apparent	grandson	1490	father died	April 1502	excluded from succession by Grand Prince	**Vasili Ivanovich**; 1490–1502, half-uncle	Ivan III
**Vasily Ivanovich**	Heir apparent	eldest living son	April 1502	nephew excluded from succession by Grand Prince	27 October 1505	became Grand Prince	Yury Ivanovich; 1502–1505, brother	Ivan III
Yury Ivanovich	Heir presumptive	brother	27 October 1505	brother became Grand Prince	25 August 1530	son born to Grand Prince	Andrey Ivanovich; 1505–1530, brother	Vasily III
**Ivan Vasilievich**	Heir apparent	eldest son	25 August 1530	born	13 December 1533	became Grand Prince	Yury Ivanovich; 1530–1532, uncle	Vasily III
**Ivan Vasilievich**	Heir apparent	eldest son	25 August 1530	born	13 December 1533	became Grand Prince	Yuri Vasilievich; 1532–1533, brother	Vasily III
Yuri Vasilievich	Heir presumptive	brother	13 December 1533	brother became Grand Prince	16 January 1547	Grand Prince crowned Tsar	Yury Ivanovich; 1533–1536, uncle	Ivan IV
Yuri Vasilievich	Heir presumptive	brother	13 December 1533	brother became Grand Prince	16 January 1547	Grand Prince crowned Tsar	Andrey Ivanovich of Staritsa; 1536–1537, uncle	Ivan IV
Yuri Vasilievich	Heir presumptive	brother	13 December 1533	brother became Grand Prince	16 January 1547	Grand Prince crowned Tsar	Vladimir of Staritsa; 1537–1547, cousin	Ivan IV

== 1547 to 1722 ==
From this point of the ruler is Tsar (Czar) of Russia.

Heir	Status	Relationship to Monarch	Became heir	Reason	Ceased to be heir	Reason	Next in line	Monarch
Yuri Vasilievich	Heir presumptive	brother	16 January 1547	ruler first crowned Tsar	11 October 1552	son born to tsar	Vladimir of Staritsa; 1547–1552, cousin	Ivan IV
Dmitry Ivanovich	Heir apparent	son	11 October 1552	born	26 June 1553	died	Yuri Vasilievich; 1552–1553, uncle	Ivan IV
Yuri Vasilievich	Heir presumptive	brother	26 June 1553	tsar's son died	28 March 1554	son born to tsar	Vladimir of Staritsa; 1553–1554, cousin	Ivan IV
Tsarevich Ivan Ivanovich	Heir apparent	son	28 March 1554	born	19 November 1581	died	Yuri Vasilievich; 1554–1557, uncle	Ivan IV
Tsarevich Ivan Ivanovich	Heir apparent	son	28 March 1554	born	19 November 1581	died	**Tsarevich Feodor Ivanovich**; 1557–1581, brother	Ivan IV
**Tsarevich Feodor Ivanovich**	Heir apparent	son	19 November 1581	brother died	18 March 1584	became tsar	uncertain	Ivan IV
**Tsarevich Feodor Ivanovich**	Heir apparent	son	19 November 1581	brother died	18 March 1584	became tsar	Tsarevich Dmitry Ivanovich; 1582–1591, half-brother	Ivan IV
Tsarevich Dmitry Ivanovich	Heir presumptive	half-brother	18 March 1584	brother became tsar	15 May 1591	died	uncertain	Feodor I
succession uncertain 1591–1598								Feodor I

Heir	Status	Relationship to Monarch	Became heir	Reason	Ceased to be heir	Reason	Next in line	Monarch
**Tsarevich Feodor Borisovich Godunov**	Heir apparent	eldest son	21 February 1598	father became tsar	13 April 1605	became tsar	uncertain	Boris Godunov
succession uncertain 1605–1606								Feodor II
succession uncertain 1605–1606								False Dmitriy I
Dmitry Shuisky	Heir presumptive	brother	19 May 1606	brother became tsar	17 July 1610	brother dethroned	Alexander Shuisky; 1606–1610, brother	Vasili IV
succession uncertain 1610–1612								Władysław IV Vasa

Heir	Status	Relationship to Monarch	Became heir	Reason	Ceased to be heir	Reason	Next in line	Monarch
Ivan Romanov	Heir presumptive	uncle	26 July 1613	nephew became tsar	9 March 1629	son born to tsar	Nikita Romanov, son	Michael
**Tsarevich Alexei Mikhailovich**	Heir apparent	eldest son	9 March 1629	born	14 July 1645	became tsar	Ivan Romanov; 1629–1640, granduncle	Michael
**Tsarevich Alexei Mikhailovich**	Heir apparent	eldest son	9 March 1629	born	14 July 1645	became tsar	Nikita Romanov; 1640–1645, cousin	Michael
Nikita Romanov	Heir presumptive	cousin	14 July 1645	cousin became tsar	22 August 1648	son born to tsar	uncertain	Alexei
Tsarevich Dmitri Alekseyevich	Heir apparent	eldest son	22 August 1648	born	6 October 1649	died	Nikita Romanov; 1648–1649, cousin	Alexei
Nikita Romanov	Heir presumptive	cousin	6 October 1649	tsar's son died	15 February 1654	son born to tsar	uncertain	Alexei
Tsarevich Alexei Alekseyevich	Heir apparent	eldest son	15 February 1654	born	17 January 1670	died	Nikita Romanov; 1654, cousin	Alexei
Tsarevich Alexei Alekseyevich	Heir apparent	eldest son	15 February 1654	born	17 January 1670	died	uncertain	Alexei
Tsarevich Alexei Alekseyevich	Heir apparent	eldest son	15 February 1654	born	17 January 1670	died	**Tsarevich Feodor Alekseyevich**; 1661–1670, brother	Alexei
**Tsarevich Feodor Alekseyevich**	Heir apparent	eldest son	17 January 1670	brother died	29 January 1676	became tsar	**Tsarevich Ivan Alekseyevich**; 1670–1676, brother	Alexei
**Tsarevich Ivan Alekseyevich**	Heir presumptive	brother	29 January 1676	brother became tsar	7 May 1682	became tsar	**Tsarevich Peter Alekseyvich**; 1676–1682, half-brother	Feodor III
succession uncertain 1682–1690								Ivan V and Peter I (jointly)
Grand Duke Alexei Petrovich	Heir presumptive and apparent	nephew and eldest son	18 February 1690	born	26 June 1718	died	uncertain	Ivan V and Peter I (jointly)
Grand Duke Alexei Petrovich	Heir presumptive and apparent	nephew and eldest son	18 February 1690	born	26 June 1718	died	Grand Duke Alexander Petrovich; 1691–1692, brother	Ivan V and Peter I (jointly)
Grand Duke Alexei Petrovich	Heir presumptive and apparent	nephew and eldest son	18 February 1690	born	26 June 1718	died	uncertain	Ivan V and Peter I (jointly)
Grand Duke Alexei Petrovich	Heir apparent	eldest son	18 February 1690	born	26 June 1718	died	uncertain	Peter I
Grand Duke Alexei Petrovich	Heir apparent	eldest son	18 February 1690	born	26 June 1718	died	**Grand Duke Peter Alekseyevich**; 1715–1718, son	Peter I
**Grand Duke Peter Alekseyevich**	Heir apparent	grandson	26 June 1718	father died	16 February 1722	Decree of the succession to the throne	Grand Duke Peter Petrovich; 1718–1719, half-uncle	Peter I
**Grand Duke Peter Alekseyevich**	Heir apparent	grandson	26 June 1718	father died	16 February 1722	Decree of the succession to the throne	uncertain	Peter I

== 1722 to 1797 ==
Between Peter I's decree on the succession to the throne of 16 February 1722 and Paul I's decree of 15 May 1797, the Emperor had the right to name his or her own successor. All heirs in this period were nominated by the reigning monarch, rather than holding the position by right of inheritance. Despite Peter the Great's modification of the law to allow nomination of a successor by the monarch, neither he nor his two immediate successors ever nominated an heir, and Catherine I, Peter II, and Anna were all chosen irregularly, after the death of their predecessor. In addition, Ivan VI, who had not named a successor, was deposed in a coup, while Peter III, who was deposed and murdered after a coup, was succeeded not by his son Paul, his chosen successor, but by his wife, who became Catherine II.

Heir	Status	Relationship to Monarch	Became heir	Reason	Ceased to be heir	Reason	Monarch
**Grand Duke Ivan Antonovich**	Crown heir	grand nephew	5 October 1740	proclaimed by Empress	28 October 1740	became emperor	Anna
**Grand Duke Peter Feodorovich**	Heir apparent	nephew	18 November 1742	proclaimed by Empress	5 January 1762	became emperor	Elizabeth
**Grand Duke Paul Petrovich**	Heir apparent	son	7 January 1762	proclaimed by Emperor, and then by Empress	17 November 1796	became emperor	Peter III and Catherine II
**Grand Duke Alexander Pavlovich**	Heir apparent	son	28 November 1796	proclaimed by Emperor	15 May 1797	Decree of the succession to the throne	Paul I

== 1797 to 1917 ==
In 1797, Emperor Paul modified the laws of succession, abolishing the Petrine law and establishing in its place a law establishing semi-Salic succession among his own descendants. This law remained until the abolition of the monarchy.

Although Grand Duke Constantine Pavlovich renounced his claims to the throne in 1822, he did so secretly, and so was still widely viewed as heir to the throne until his older brother's death in 1825. At the death of Alexander I, the next brother, who would become Nicholas I, deferred his claims until his older brother Constantine renounced once again, but after Constantine's second renunciation he claimed to have taken the throne immediately upon Alexander's death.

Heirs to the Russian throne
Monarch	Heir	Relationship to monarch	Became heir (Date; Reason)	Ceased to be heir (Date; Reason)	Next in line of succession
Paul I	**Tsesarevich Alexander Pavlovich**	Son	15 May 1797; Law of succession changed	23 March 1801; Father assassinated, became emperor	Grand Duke Constantine Pavlovich, brother
Alexander I	Grand Duke Constantine Pavlovich	Brother	23 March 1801; Brother became emperor	26 January 1822; Renounced claim to the throne	**Grand Duke Nicholas Pavlovich**, brother
Alexander I	**Grand Duke Nicholas Pavlovich**	Brother	26 January 1822; Brother renounced	1 December 1825; Brother died, became emperor	**Grand Duke Alexander Nikolaevich**, son
Nicholas I	**Tsesarevich Alexander Nikolaevich**	Son	1 December 1825; Father became emperor	2 March 1855; Father died, became emperor	Grand Duke Michael Pavlovich, 1825–1827, uncle
Nicholas I	**Tsesarevich Alexander Nikolaevich**	Son	1 December 1825; Father became emperor	2 March 1855; Father died, became emperor	Grand Duke Constantine Nikolaevich, 1827–1843, brother
Nicholas I	**Tsesarevich Alexander Nikolaevich**	Son	1 December 1825; Father became emperor	2 March 1855; Father died, became emperor	Grand Duke Nicholas Alexandrovich, 1843–1855, son
Alexander II	Tsesarevich Nicholas Alexandrovich	Son	2 March 1855; Father became emperor	24 April 1865; Died	**Grand Duke Alexander Alexandrovich**, brother
Alexander II	**Tsesarevich Alexander Alexandrovich**	Son	24 April 1865; Brother died	13 March 1881; Father assassinated, became emperor	Grand Duke Vladimir Alexandrovich, 1865–1868, brother
Alexander II	**Tsesarevich Alexander Alexandrovich**	Son	24 April 1865; Brother died	13 March 1881; Father assassinated, became emperor	**Grand Duke Nicholas Alexandrovich**, 1868–1881, son
Alexander III	**Tsesarevich Nicholas Alexandrovich**	Son	13 March 1881; Father became emperor	1 November 1894; Father died, became emperor	Grand Duke George Alexandrovich, brother
Nicholas II	Grand Duke George Alexandrovich	Brother	1 November 1894; Brother became emperor	10 July 1899; Died	Grand Duke Michael Alexandrovich, brother
Nicholas II	Grand Duke Michael Alexandrovich	Brother	10 July 1899; Brother died	12 August 1904; Son born to emperor	Grand Duke Vladimir Alexandrovich, uncle
Nicholas II	Tsesarevich Alexei Nikolaevich	Son	12 August 1904; Born	15 March 1917; Father abdicated, monarchy abolished	Grand Duke Michael Alexandrovich, uncle

== See also ==
- Tsesarevich
