= Savvino-Storozhevsky Monastery =

Orthodox monastery in Zvenigorod, Moscow Oblast, Russia

The Savvino-Storozhevsky Monastery
- Саввино-Сторожевский монастырь
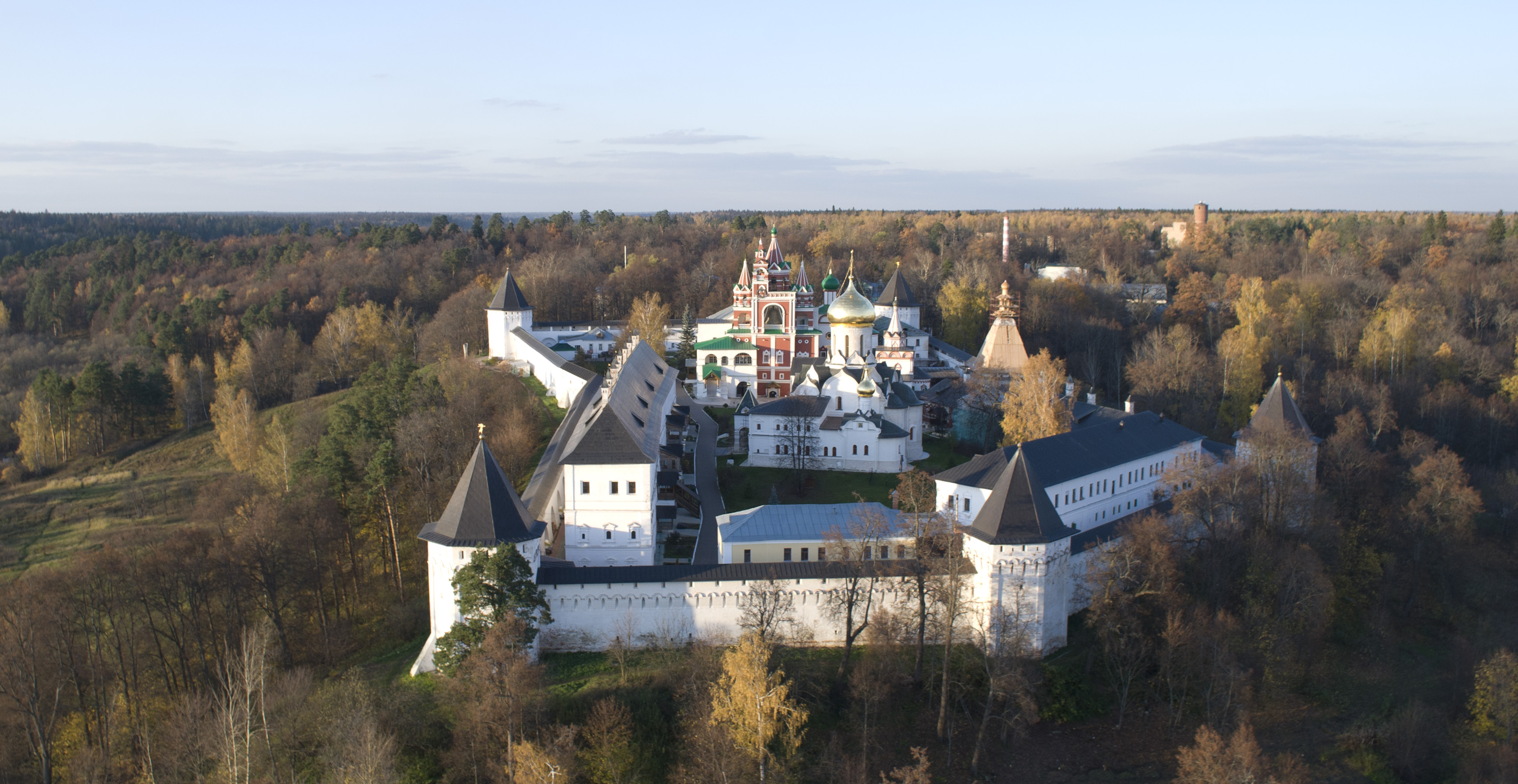
- Panoramic view, 2011

Monastery information
- Established: 1398
- Dedicated to: Orthodoxy
- Diocese: stauropegial

Site
- Coordinates: 55.728°N 36.816°E
- Website: savvastor.ru

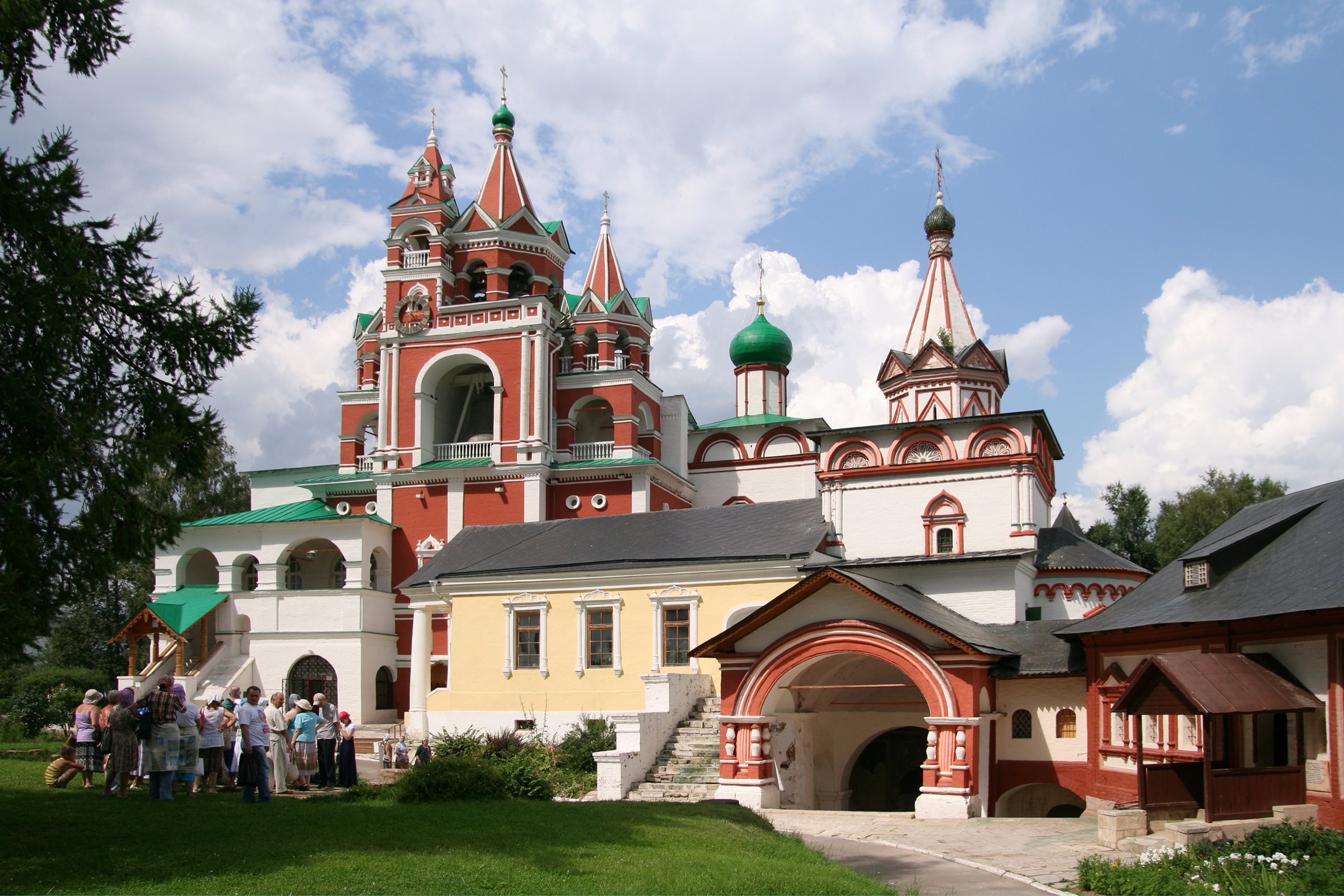
A group of three 17th-century churches

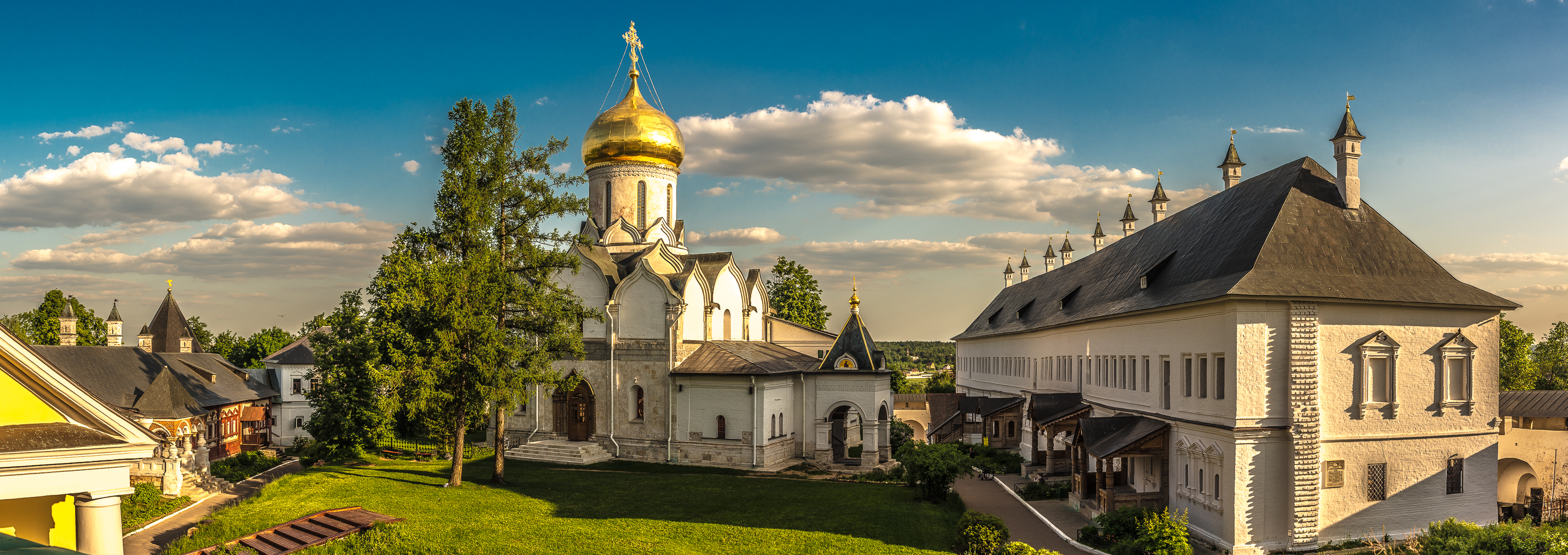
The ashlar palace of Tsar Alexis and the katholikon from 1405

The Savvino-Storozhevsky Monastery (Russian: Саввино-Сторожевский монастырь, lit. 'the Storozhi monastery of St. Savva') is a Russian Orthodox monastery dedicated to the feast of the Nativity of the Theotokos. It is the preeminent landmark of Zvenigorod, a town located 48 km (30 mi) west of Moscow.

== History ==
=== Foundation ===
In 1398, Prince Yuri of Zvenigorod asked Savva, or Sabbas, one of the first disciples of Sergius of Radonezh, to come to his capital city and set up a monastic abode. At first, only one wooden church, dedicated to the Nativity of the Blessed Virgin Mary, was established on the high Storozhi hill above the Moskva River. Saint Sabbas sought solitude and prayed in a small cave, dug with his own hands. With time more and more monks settled in the new abode. In 1402 Yury Dmitrievich granted it several villages, vast land and forest tenures. St. Savva of Storozhi was interred in the white stone cathedral of the Virgin's Nativity in 1407. This diminutive, roughly hewn church still stands, although its present-day exquisite look is the result of a 1970s restoration campaign. The frescoes in the altar date back to the 1420s, but the rest of the interior was painted in 1656. A magnificent iconostasis in five tiers and the Stroganov school royal doors were installed in 1652.

=== Tsar Residence ===
In 15-17th centuries the monastery served as a military picket, defending the Grand Duchy of Moscow on the West. In 1650, the pious Tsar Alexis selected the Zvenigorod monastery as his suburban residence. An ashlar residence for the tsar and a smaller palace for his wife date from the early 1650s. Alexis had the churches encircled with stone walls and towers, patterned after those of the Troitse-Sergiyeva Lavra. Particularly noteworthy is a large belfry, erected in four bays in 1650 and crowned with three tents and a clocktower. A new 'gate church' was built by Ivan Sharutin in 1650 and consecrated to the feast of the Holy Trinity in 1652. In 1650 the Church of the Transfiguration was built by Princess Sophia. She also ordered to establish the refectory and in 1686-1687 rebuilt the Tsar Alexis' palace.

Since the times of Tsar Alexis the monastery was one of the most important religious places in Russia. All the following tsars and tsarinas, and later — emperors and empresses, came here to pray and receive a blessing before the ceremony of crowning. The road from the Moscow Kremlin to Zvenigorod and the Savvino-Storozhevsky monastery was called the Tsar Road or The Road Of God Blessed Tsars, nowadays it is known as Rublevskoe shosse.

During the Napoleonic Wars, on September 12, 1812, the Italian corps of viceroy Eugene Bograne defeated Wintzingerode's squadron of light cavalry under the monastery walls. The skirmish is described in the memoirs of Prince Sergey Volkonsky and Count Alexander von Benckendorff. According to the local legend, Eugene Bograne stayed at the Sentry Tabernacle of the Savvino-Storozhevsky Monastery. St. Sabba visited Prince Eugene in a dream, promising him a safe return home if his soldiers would not plunder the monastery. Eugene Bograne spared the monastery and indeed returned home safely.

=== 20th century ===
In May 1918, when the Bolsheviks tried to seize the relics of St. Savva, several persons were shot dead. The monastery was ransacked and pillaged, including the tomb of Saint Savva, made of gold plated silver, then the monks were chased out and finally the cathedral was left to ruin. In 1941 the 35-ton main bell was destroyed.

In 1985, the compound was assigned to the Danilov Monastery in Moscow. St. Savva's relics were returned to the monastery in 1998.

Both major churches used to be entirely covered with frescoes and until the revolution had the old icon screens of five levels. Only a few fragments of the original frescoes have survived the Soviet period.

== Tourism ==
The monastery is a well known touristic attraction on top of being a site of pilgrimage, and is readily accessible from Moscow by a combination of railroad and bus transport. A hotel run by the monastery offers accommodation to pilgrims and tourists wishing to remain overnight. The local Zvenigorod museum operates exhibitions within the Tsarina's palace located in the monastery complex. These deal with several subjects of local history, the life of the nobility and royal family, and religious icons from the 17th to the early 20th century. Not unlike Western European monasteries, the Savvino-Storozhevsky monastery has a brewery, selling kvas and sbiten to the public as well as operating a bakery which produces and sells a wide variety of bread and pastries to visitors. Two canteens for visitors are also operated by the monastery, one right outside the walls of the main monastery complex and another on the road to the skete, serving both the monastery's own products and commercial foods and drinks.

== In Culture ==
Director Andrei Tarkovsky filmed the first and final scenes of his 1972 film Solaris at a dacha near the Monastery of St. Savva of Storozhi.

== Sources ==
- Shvidkovsky, Dmitrii (2007). Russian Architecture and the West. London: Yale University Press. pp. 166–168. ISBN 978-0-300-10912-2.
- Denisov, Leonid (2022) [2019]. 1100 православных монастырей Российской империи [1100 Orthodox Monasteries of Russian Empire] (in Russian). Moscow: Tzenterpolighaf. ISBN 9785041532109.
