= Battle of Belyov =

Battle between Russians and Tatars

- Part of First Russo-Kazan war (1437–1445)
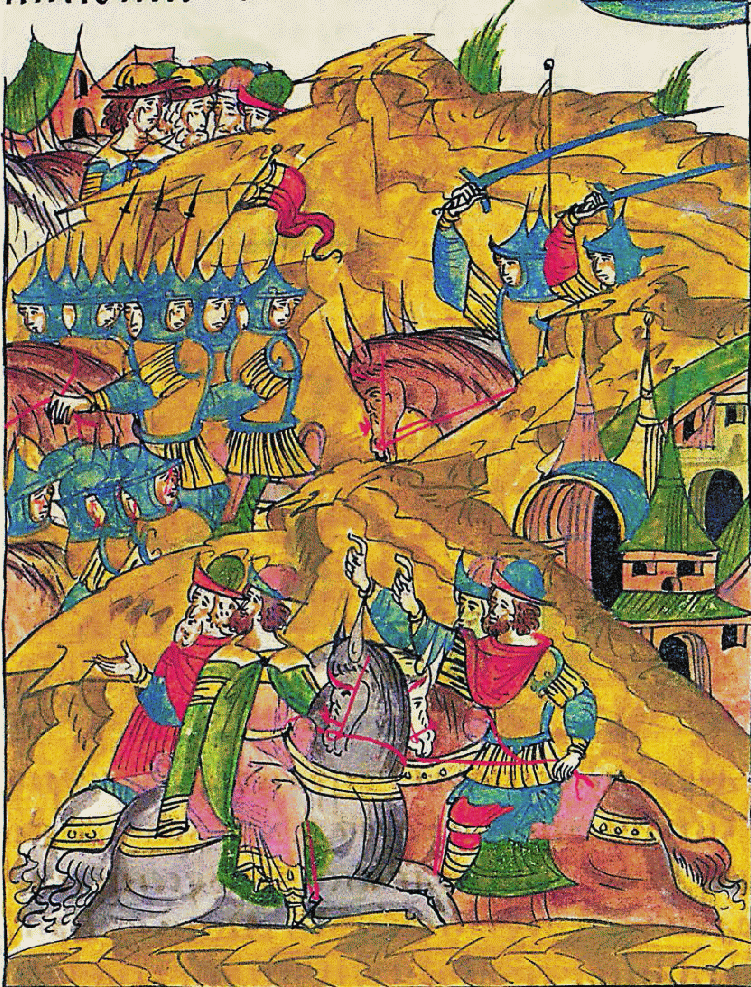
- Miniature from the Illustrated Chronicle of Ivan the Terrible
Date	5 December 1437
Location	Belyov, Moscow principality (modern Russia)
Result	Tatar victory

Belligerents
Grand Duchy of Moscow	Golden Horde

Commanders and leaders
Dmitry Shemyaka; Dmitry Krasny	Ulugh Muhammad

Strength
Modern estimates: unknown, but less than tatar Tatar source: 40,000 (exaggerated)	3,000–10,000; Other estimates: 40,000

The Battle of Belyov (Russian: Битва под Белёвом) was fought in 1437 near Belyov (Belev) between the troops of the Grand Duchy of Moscow under the command of Dmitry Shemyaka and Tatars led by Ulugh Muhammad. The consensus is that the battle was a Tatar victory.

== Background ==
By 1437 Khan Ulugh Muhammad lost the struggle for power in the Golden Horde. He was forced to flee and appeared with the small army near the town Belyov, which is in the upper reaches of the Oka River. Initially Grand Duke of Moscow Vasily II, who was indebted to Ulugh Muhammad for the throne of the Grand Duchy, received fugitive Khan rather well and allowed him to nomadize in the vicinity of Belyov. There is evidence that Vasily II and Ulugh Muhammad concluded some kind of treaty, vowing not to commit hostile actions against each other. However, after the position of Ulugh Muhammad strengthened, he began plundering raids: "he ravaged foreign lands, like an eagle, flying far from his nest in search of food". This caused concern among people in the inner circles of Moscow Principality and they put pressure on Vasily II, so he decided to expel Ulugh Muhammad from Belyov. It is interesting to note that at that time the Grand Duke of Lithuania was formally suzerain of Belyov, like other Upper Oka Principalities, but they also retained their ties with Moscow.

== 1437 campaign ==
Vasily II sent to Belyov an army under the command of his cousins Dmitry Shemyaka and Dmitry Krasny (they were also his rivals in the struggle for the throne of the Grand Duchy), and "many other princes". Russian sources estimate the army sent to Belyov as very numerous. On the way the army robbed local people (according to the Grand Duke's chronicle), not only in order to feed themselves, but also sent the loot home.

Going to spend the winter near Belyov, Ulugh Muhammad built near the town a kind of fortification ("ostrog") – wicker walls were covered with snow and watered. After the water froze, a strong "ice fortress" was formed. The fortification was well located: from the West and South the approaches were protected by a deep ravine, along which the Belyovka River flowed, and from the East there was the steep bank of the Oka River. The gentle approach was only from the North, and at the narrowest point the passage was no more than 100 m (300 ft) wide.

== Battle ==
On 4 December Russian forces attacked the Tatars and drove them into the ice fortress, but were defeated trying to take it at once. Princes Pyotr Kuzminsky and Semyon Volynets, who broke into the fortification on the heels of the retreating Tatars, were killed. According to the Russian chronicle, the losses of the Tatars were also heavy, some unnamed Ulug Mohammed's son-in-law was even killed there.

Instead of preparing for a coordinated assault, the Russian commanders entered into negotiations and lost their vigilance. In some chronicles, the main blame is assigned to Grigory Protasyev, voivode of Mtsensk, who allegedly sided with Ulug Mohammed and "made a treason". Protasyev reported that the Grand Duke wished to conclude peace and did not order "to fight with the Tsar". (Note: At that time, The Grand Duchy of Moscow recognized its submission to the Tatars and called the Khan of the Golden Horde the "Tsar" (i.e. the supreme ruler).) During the negotiations on the morning of 5 December, Ulu-Mohammed refused to pay him any tribute and promised not to attack the Russian principalities, and offered his son as a hostage. In return, Ulu-Mohammad asked only to be allowed to remain near Belyov until spring. However, voivodes Vasily Sobakin and Andrei Goltyaev, who conducted the negotiations, rejected this proposal. Then Ulug Mohammed, who found himself in a desperate situation, personally led the attack on the Russian army. Taking advantage of the "great mist" the Tatars made the turning movement and attacked from the rear of the unprepared Russian troops. There was panic and total flight, and thus Ulug Mohammed won a complete victory. Gumilev (2024), however, interpreted it as a Tatar defeat.

== Aftermath ==
After the defeat at Belyov, Vasily II together with Dmitry Shemyaka and Dmitry Krasny signed a treaty with Boris Aleksandrovich, Grand Prince of Tver, envisaging, in particular, mutual aid in case of invasion of "Tsar" (Khan) or other Tatars. In return, Vasily and his cousins promised not to accept the city Tver and Kashin from the Tatars. (Note: As the supreme ruler, the Khan of the Golden Horde could theoretically take away the rights to rule from the Tver Prince and transfer his lands to the Grand Duchy of Moscow.)

Ulug Mohammed after the victory at Belyov captured the desolate city of Kazan, strengthened there and founded the Khanate of Kazan, and soon began raids on Russia.

== Sources ==
- Zimin, Aleksandr (1991). Витязь на распутье. Феодальная война в России XV в. [The Knight at the Crossroads. The feudal war in Russia of the 15th century]. Moscow: Мысль. ISBN 5-244-00518-9.
- Bespalov, R. A. (2005). Белёвское побоище 1437 г. в истории Северо-Восточной Руси первой половины XV в.. Белёвские чтения (in Russian). 5: 31–55.
- Bakhtin, A. (2008). Образование Казанского и Касимовского ханств [Formation of the Kazan and Kasimov Khaganates] (in Russian). Yoshkar-Ola. ISBN 978-5-94808-423-7.
- Seliverstov, D. (2012). Золотоордынская цивилизация [Golden Horde civilization] (in Russian). Kazan. ISBN 978-5-905576-26-3.
- Iskhakov, D. (2005). Татары: популярная этнография (этническая история татарского народа) [Tatars: popular ethnography (ethnic history of the Tatar people)] (in Russian). Kazan. ISBN 5-298-04130-2.
- Rakhimzyanov, B. (2012). Прибытие первых Джучидов в Московское Великое княжество: начало трансформации империи [Arrival of the first Jochids in the Grand Duchy of Moscow: the beginning of the transformation of the empire] (in Russian).
- Safargaliev, Magomet (1960). Распад золотой орды [The collapse of the Golden Horde] (in Russian). Мордовский государственный университет.
- Dimitriev, V. (2003). Чебоксары: очерки истории города конца XIII—XVII вв [Cheboksary: essays on the history of the city from the end of the 13th to the 17th centuries] (in Russian). Cheboksary. ISBN 5-87677-008-6.
- Gumilev, Lev (2024). от Руси к России [from Rus to Russia] (in Russian). Moscow. ISBN 978-5-17-153493-6.
