= Galichsky District =

Galichsky District Галичский район (Russian)
- District
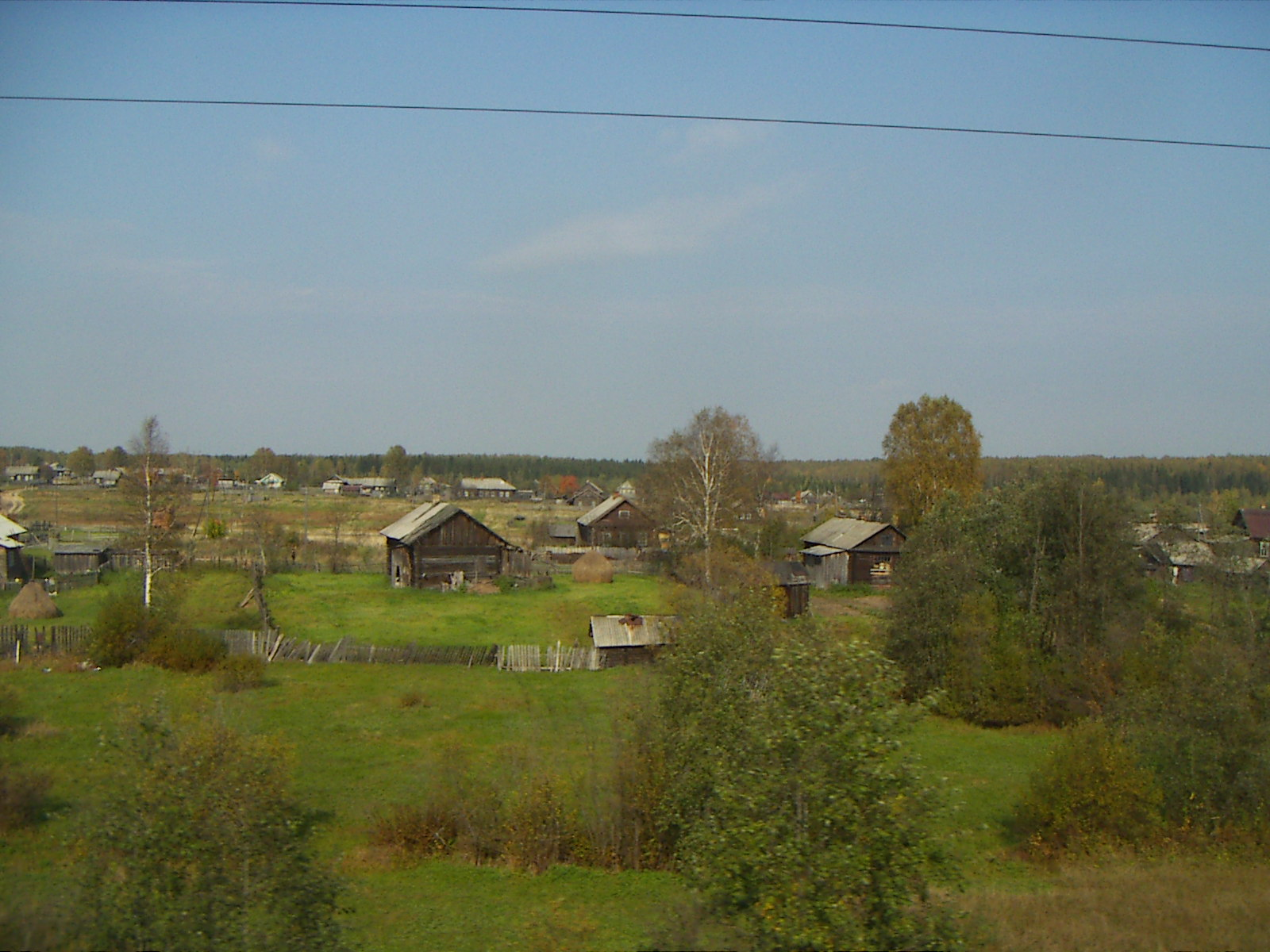
- Village in Galichsky District

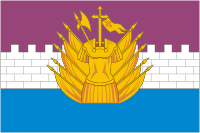
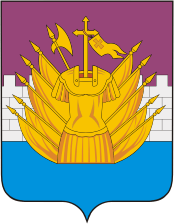
- Flag Coat of arms
- Location of Galichsky District in Kostroma Oblast
- Coordinates: 58°23′N 42°21′E
- Country: Russia
- Federal subject: Kostroma Oblast
- Established: 8 October 1928
- Administrative center: Galich

Area
  - Total: 2,870 km^{2} (1,110 sq mi)

Population (2010 Census)
  - Total: 8,738
  - Density: 3.04/km^{2} (7.89/sq mi)
  - Urban: 0%
  - Rural: 100%

Administrative structure
  - Administrative divisions: 5 Settlements
  - Inhabited localities: 299 rural localities

Municipal structure
  - Municipally incorporated as: Galichsky Municipal District
  - Municipal divisions: 0 urban settlements, 5 rural settlements
- Time zone: UTC+3 (MSK)
- OKTMO ID: 34608000
- Website: https://gal-mr.ru/

Galichsky District (Russian: Га́личский райо́н) is an administrative and municipal district (raion), one of the twenty-four in Kostroma Oblast, Russia. It is located in the west of the oblast. The area of the district is 2,870 square kilometers (1,110 sq mi). Its administrative center is the town of Galich (which is not administratively a part of the district). Population: 6,661 (2021 census); 8,738 (2010 census); 11,503 (2002 Census); 13,792 (1989 Soviet census).

== Administrative and municipal status ==
Within the framework of administrative divisions, Galichsky District is one of the twenty-four in the oblast. The town of Galich serves as its administrative center, despite being incorporated separately as a town of oblast significance—an administrative unit with the status equal to that of the districts.

As a municipal division, the district is incorporated as Galichsky Municipal District. The town of oblast significance of Galich is incorporated separately from the district as Galich Urban Okrug.
