= Sabbas of Storozhi =

Russian monk (died 1407)

Saint Sabbas of Storozhi
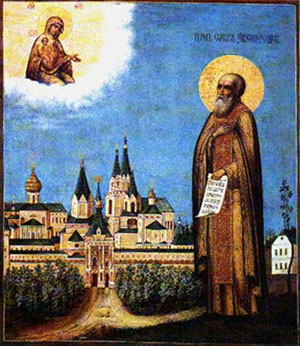
- Savva Storozhevsky against the backdrop of a monastery, 19th-century icon
- Died: 1407
- Honored in: Eastern Orthodox Church
- Beatified: 1547
- Major shrine: Savvino-Storozhevsky Monastery
- Feast: 23 August and 19 December

Sabbas of Storozhi (Russian: Савва Сторожевский, romanized: Savva Storozhevsky; died 1407) was a Russian Orthodox monk and saint of the 14th and 15th centuries. He was the founder and the first hegumen of the monastery of the Nativity of the Theotokos in Zvenigorod on Storozhi hill, which was later named after him (Savvino-Storozhevsky Monastery).

Sabbas was one of the first disciples of Sergius of Radonezh and spent almost the whole of his life in Trinity-St. Sergius Lavra.

Sabbas was very popular for his alleged healings, sagacity and preaching. He died in 1407 and was canonized in 1547.

Commemorated on August 23 and December 19.

In 1812, Sabbas appeared to Eugéne de beauharnais in a dream when he was raiding the savvino-storozhevsky monastery. When Eugéne saw a portrait of Sabbas he identified it as the person in his dream and spared the monastery.
