= Muscovite War of Succession =

15th-century war of succession in Muscovy

Muscovite War of Succession Muscovite Civil War
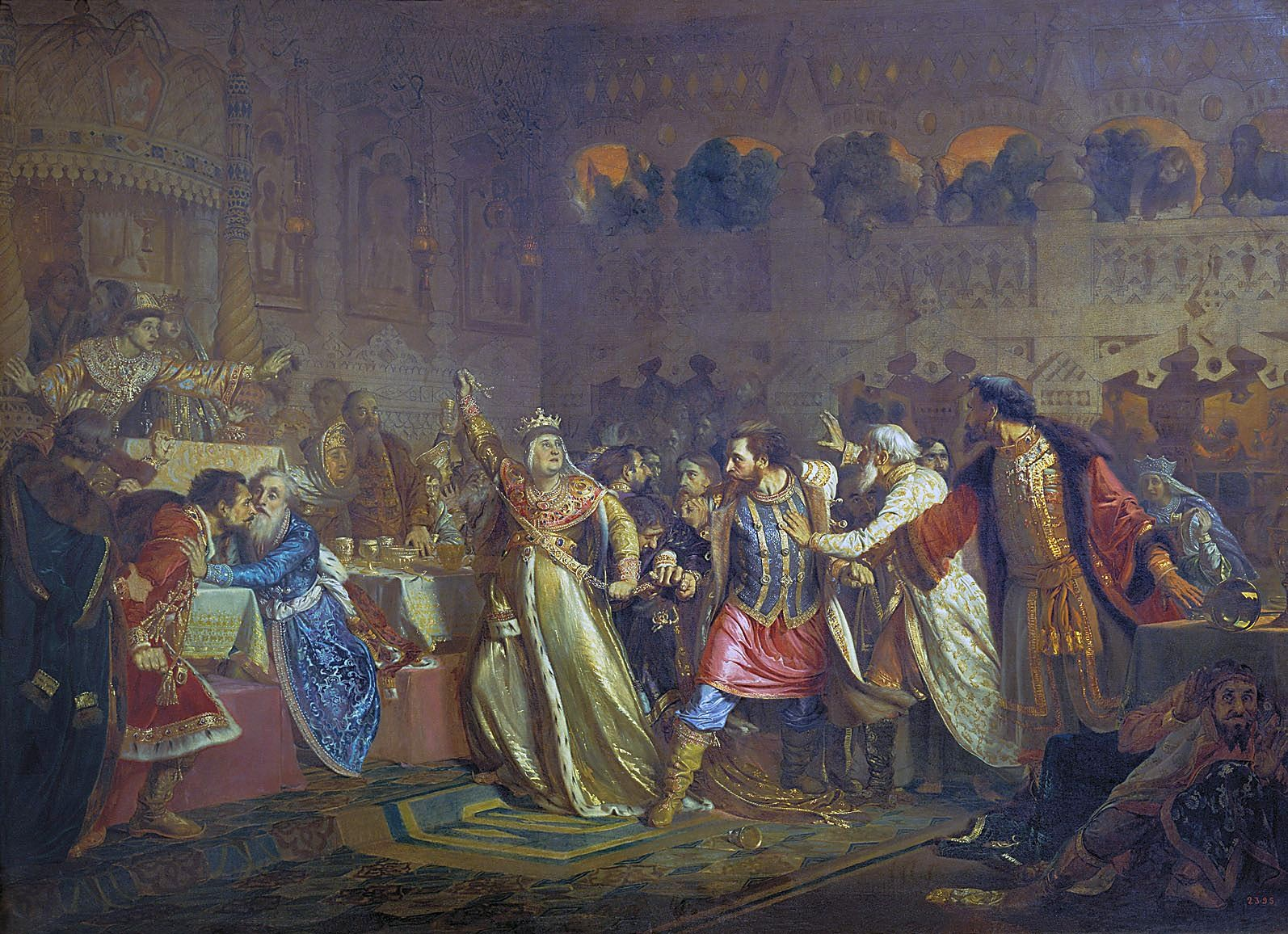
- Sophia of Lithuania insulting Vasily Kosoy during a wedding feast. 1861 painting by Pavel Chistyakov
Date	1425 – 1453
Location	Grand Duchy of Moscow (Muscovy)
Result	Vasily II victory

Belligerents
Younger Donskoy line	Older Donskoy line

Commanders and leaders
1425—1434 Vasily II Vasilyevich	1425—1434 Yury Dmitrievich Dmitry II Shemyaka (1433–4); Vasily Kosoy (1433–4)
1434—1436 Vasily II Vasilyevich; Dmitry II Shemyaka Dmitry Krasny	1434—1436 Vasily Kosoy
1436—1453 Vasily II Vasilyevich; Mäxmüd of Kazan (1445–8) Boris of Tver (1446–53); Ivan of Mozhaysk (1445–7); Qasim Khan (1452–3)	1436—1453 Dmitry II Shemyaka (1439; 1445–53); Ulugh of Kazan (1437–45) Ivan of Mozhaysk (1447–53)

The Muscovite War of Succession, or Muscovite Civil War, was a war of succession in the Grand Duchy of Moscow (Muscovy) from 1425 to 1453. (Note: "The struggle was precipitated by the challenge of an uncle to the succession of his nephew on the grand princely throne. The death of the challenger (whose claim was debatable) did not end the dispute. For another nineteen years the struggle continued intermittently (...).") The two warring parties were Vasily II, the son of the previous Grand Prince of Moscow Vasily I, and on the other hand his uncle, Yury Dmitrievich, the Prince of Zvenigorod, and the sons of Yuri Dmitrievich, Vasily Kosoy and Dmitry Shemyaka. In the intermediate stage, the party of Yury conquered Moscow, but in the end, Vasily II regained his crown.

According to Alef (1956), it was "the only struggle for succession in Moscow's history", as well as "the only civil war within the Muscovite principality". He argued that "the death rate in the Moscow family was so high that the dynasty barely maintained itself. When the inheritors to the family patrimony increased sharply at the end of the fourteenth century, an internecine struggle was foreordained. This element helps explain the stability and strength of Moscow in the fourteenth century."

== Background ==
The Mongol invasion of Kievan Rus' of 1236–1241 left the Rus' principalities subjugated by the Golden Horde. In the 13th–15th centuries, the Khan of the Golden Horde appointed the Great Prince, who in the 14th century resided in Moscow. In the 13th century the medieval Rus' consisted of a set of relatively small and weak principalities, fighting and making alliances against each other. The larger states (like the Grand Duchy of Moscow and the Republic of Novgorod) progressively conquered or absorbed the smaller ones. One bigger principality, the Grand Duchy of Moscow, grew due to a series of clever policies and became the biggest one in central Rus'. In 1380 Dmitry Donskoy, the prince of Moscow, even managed to fight the troops of Golden Horde in the Battle of Kulikovo and win. Whereas formally Moscow remained dependent on the Horde, and the Khan needed to approve position of the Prince, the Grand Duchy of Moscow had become a major regional power, and the Moscow princes aimed to conquer the remaining lands around Moscow and to append them to their Grand Duchy.

When Dmitry Donskoy wrote his will just before he died in 1389, he appointed his 17-year-old son Vasily Dmitrievich as successor, with the provision that if Vasily were to die childless, his 14-year-old son Yury Dmitrievich would be the successor.

== First period (1425–1434) ==
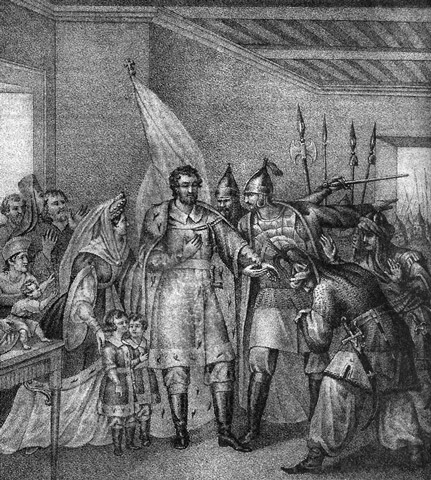
The Muscovite boyars pledge their support to the dethroned Vasily II

Vasily died in 1425 and left several children. Allegedly, he appointed his oldest son Vasily Vasilyevich, as the next Grand Prince (known as Vasily II). Yury challenged this appointment, arguing that he should have received the crown because of the provisions written in Donskoy's will. (Note: "When Dmitrii Donskoi composed his will, his son Vasilii had yet to produce a son of his own. Therefore Donskoi named his second son, Yurii, as Vasilii's heir. Subsequently Vasilii did indeed father a son, Vasilii II, whose accession to the throne was challenged by his uncle Yurii.") In 1425, Yuri and Vasily agreed to present their succession dispute to khan of the Golden Horde, but this led to nothing.

In 1428 Yury Dmitrievich formally conceded, under pressure from Metropolitan Photius, who personally travelled to Galich. However, in 1431 Yury decided to seek the title of Prince of Moscow with the Khan of the Horde. In 1432, Yuri and Vasily travelled to Sarai together to seek the judgement of Khan Ulugh Muhammad (Ulu-Mehmet). The Khan awarded the princely throne to Vasily, but confirmed Yuri's appanage (udel) of Galich, and additionally granted Yuri the town of Dmitrov. The formal pretext to start a war was found in 1433, when during the marriage feast of Vasily his mother, Sophia of Lithuania, insulted Vasily Yuryevich, the son of Yury, in public. Both sons of Yury, Vasily and Dmitry, left for Galich. They plundered Yaroslavl, ruled by an allied of Vasily II, allied with their father, collected an army, and defeated the army of Vasily II. Subsequently, Yury Dmitrievich entered Moscow, declared himself the Great Prince, and sent Vasily II to Kolomna. Eventually, however, he did not prove himself as an efficient head of state, having alienated some Muscovites who fled to Kolomna, and even alienating his own sons. Eventually, Yury allied with Vasily II against the sons of Yury and returned the Moscow Princedom to Vasily II, who, in his turn, started to persecute former supporters of Yury. Vasily then sent an army against his cousins, sons of Yury, Vasily Yuryevich and Dmitry Shemyaka, in 1433. His army was defeated in a major battle on the Klyazma (25 April 1433), in which troops of Yury were fighting against Vasily. Vasily conquered Galich, and Yury openly joined his sons. The army of Vasily II was finally defeated in the Battle of Mogza (20 March 1434), close to Rostov. Yury became the Prince of Moscow again, but suddenly died, and his son, Vasily Yuryevich, became his successor. At this point, Vasily II was in Nizhny Novgorod and was preparing to travel to the Horde to leave a complaint with the Khan.

== Second period (1434–1436) ==
The brothers of Vasily Yuryevich — Dmitry Shemyaka and Dmitry Krasny — refused to lend him any support. Anticipating that Vasily would not be able to keep Moscow for long, they preferred to ally with Vasily II so that eventually they could get additional lands from him. Indeed, Vasily gave Rzhev and Uglich to Dmitry Shemyaka and Bezhetsky Verkh to Dmitry Krasny. Vasily Yuryevich was driven out of Moscow; he also lost Zvenigorod to Vasily II and was left landless, forced to flee to Novgorod.

In 1435, Vasily managed to collect an army in Kostroma and moved in the direction of Moscow. He lost a battle on the bank of the Kotorosl River to Vasily II and fled to Kashin. He then managed to conquer Vologda and built up a new army with the support of Vyatka. With this new army he moved again to the south and encountered Vasily II in Kostroma. The two armies were stationed on two banks of the Kostroma River and could not start fighting immediately. Before the fight started, the two cousins concluded a peace treaty. Vasily Yuryevich recognized Vasily II as the Great Prince and got Dmitrov. However, he only spent a month in Dmitrov and subsequently moved to Kostroma and further to Galich and to Veliky Ustyug. In Veliky Ustyug, the army formed in Vyatka, which had supported Yuri Dmitrievich for a long time, joined Vasily. Vasily Yuryevich plundered Veliky Ustyug and with the army went south again. In early 1436, he lost a battle in Skoryatino, close to Rostov, to Vasily II, and was captured.

Subsequently, when the Vyatka people continued to attack the lands belonging to the Grand Prince, Vasily II ordered to have Vasily Yuryevich blinded. Vasily Yuryevich was known after that as Vasily Kosoy. He lived until 1448, but chronicles do not mention him between 1436 and 1448; apparently he was imprisoned all this time. At the same time Vasily II released Dmitry Shemyaka, who had been exiled to Kolomna, and concluded a treaty with him similar to the treaty he previously concluded with Vasily Kosoy, returning Shemyaka all his lands.

== Third period (1436–1453) ==
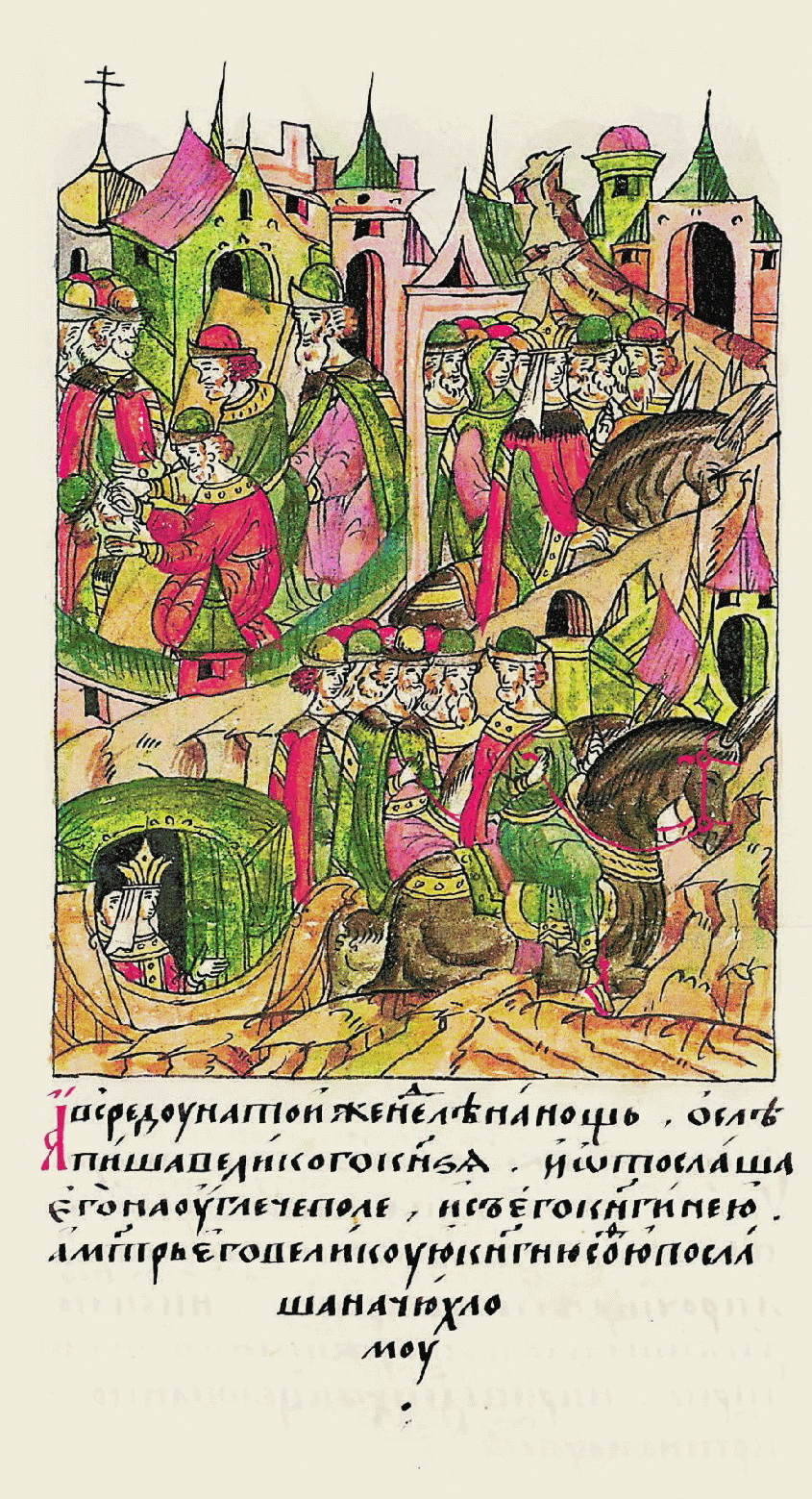
The Blinding of Vasily II, a miniature from the Illustrated Chronicle of Ivan the Terrible

In the early 1440s Vasily II was mostly busy with the wars against the Khanate of Kazan. The Khan, Ulugh Muhammad, besieged Moscow in 1439. Dmitry Shemyaka, despite being under the oath of allegiance, failed to appear in support of Vasily. After the Tatars left, Vasily chased Shemyaka, forcing him to flee to Novgorod again. Subsequently, Shemyaka returned to Moscow and confirmed his allegiance. In 1444, Tatars led by Mustafa, the Khan of the Golden Horde, plundered the Ryazan lands, before being defeated by a much larger army sent by Vasily. In 1445, Ulugh Muhammad conquered Nizhny Novgorod, was defeated in a skirmish near Murom, but won the second battle in Suzdal, capturing, among other prominent Muscovites, Vasily II.

Vasily was released after negotiations, having promised to pay an enormous ransom. This resulted in an increase of taxes and, consequently, in discontent, which strengthened the party of Dmitry Shemyaka. In early 1446, Vasily was captured by Shemyaka in the Trinity Sergius Lavra, brought to Moscow, blinded, and then sent to Uglich. Shemyaka started to reign as the Prince of Moscow. In the fall of 1446 he traveled to Uglich to seek peace with Vasily. They made a deal, Vasily gave an oath of allegiance and promised not to seek the Great Princedom any more, and in return he was released and got Vologda in his possession. In Vologda, Vasily traveled to the Kirillo-Belozersky Monastery, and the hegumen released him from the oath. Vasily immediately started preparations for the war against Shemyaka.

In addition, Shemyaka and his ally, Prince Ivan of Mozhaysk, ruled inefficiently, did not manage to attract allies, and nobility started to defect from Moscow to Vologda. Vasily also managed to ally with Kazan Tatars. In the end of 1446, when Dmitry Shemyaka was out in Volokolamsk, the army of Vasily II entered Moscow. Vasily then started to chase Shemyaka and Mozheysky, who had to retreat, with both armies ravaging and plundering the country. In 1447, they asked for peace, and agreed to accept the superiority of Vasily. Nevertheless, Dmitry Shemyaka continued resistance, trying to attract the allies and to collect a big enough army to fight against Vasily. In 1448, Vasily started military action, which included mostly Northern lands up to Veliky Ustyug and with some interruptions continued till 1452, when Shemyaka was finally defeated and fled to Novgorod. In 1453, he was poisoned there following a direct order of Vasily.

Subsequently, Vasily managed to remove all local princes who previously supported Shemyaka. In particular, Ivan Mozheysky had to flee with their family to Lithuania, and the Principality of Mozhaysk was made a part of the Grand Duchy of Moscow. Similarly, the Principality of Serpukhov was made a part of the Grand Duchy, and the Principality of Vereya remained after the war the only independent state in Moscow lands.

== Assessment ==
Halperin (2001) observed: 'During the Muscovite civil war both sides simultaneously sought the assistance of the Khan, and excoriated their opponents for doing exactly the same thing.' In 1977, Halperin had observed that the Muscovite War of Succession weakened Muscovy so much that its old rival, the Principality of Tver, once again felt strong enough to challenge its sole claim to represent the "Rus' Land" (русская земля). Although the Word of Praise (pokhval'noe slovo) to Boris of Tver never claimed the myth of the Rus' Land exclusively for itself instead, it did suggest that the "Tverian Land" (Тферськая земля) and "Muscovite Land" (Московская земля) were equals within a larger "Rus' Land", and went as far as having foreigners say that grand prince Boris Aleksandrovich of Tver was 'the greatest prince of the Rus' Land'.

== Bibliography ==
- Alef, Gustave (1956). A history of the Muscovite civil war: the reign of Vasili II (1425–1462) (PhD).
- Alef, Gustave (1983). "The Battle of Suzdal' in 1445. An Episode in the Muscovite War of Succession (1978)". Rulers and nobles in fifteenth century Muscovy. Part II. London: Variorum Reprints. pp. 11–20. ISBN 9780860781202. (first published in Forschungen zur osteuropäischen Geschichte 25 (1978) Berlin.)
- Halperin, Charles J. (1987). Russia and the Golden Horde: The Mongol Impact on Medieval Russian History. p. 222. ISBN 9781850430575. (e-book).
- Halperin, Charles J. (2001). "Text and Textology: Salmina's Dating of the Chronicle Tales about Dmitrii Donskoi". Slavonic and East European Review. 79 (2): 248–263. doi:10.1353/see.2001.0046.
- Martin, Janet (2007). Medieval Russia: 980–1584. Second Edition. E-book. Cambridge: Cambridge University Press. ISBN 978-0-511-36800-4.
