= Dmitry Shemyaka =

Grand Prince of Moscow (died 1453)

Dmitry Yurievch of Galich-Mersky
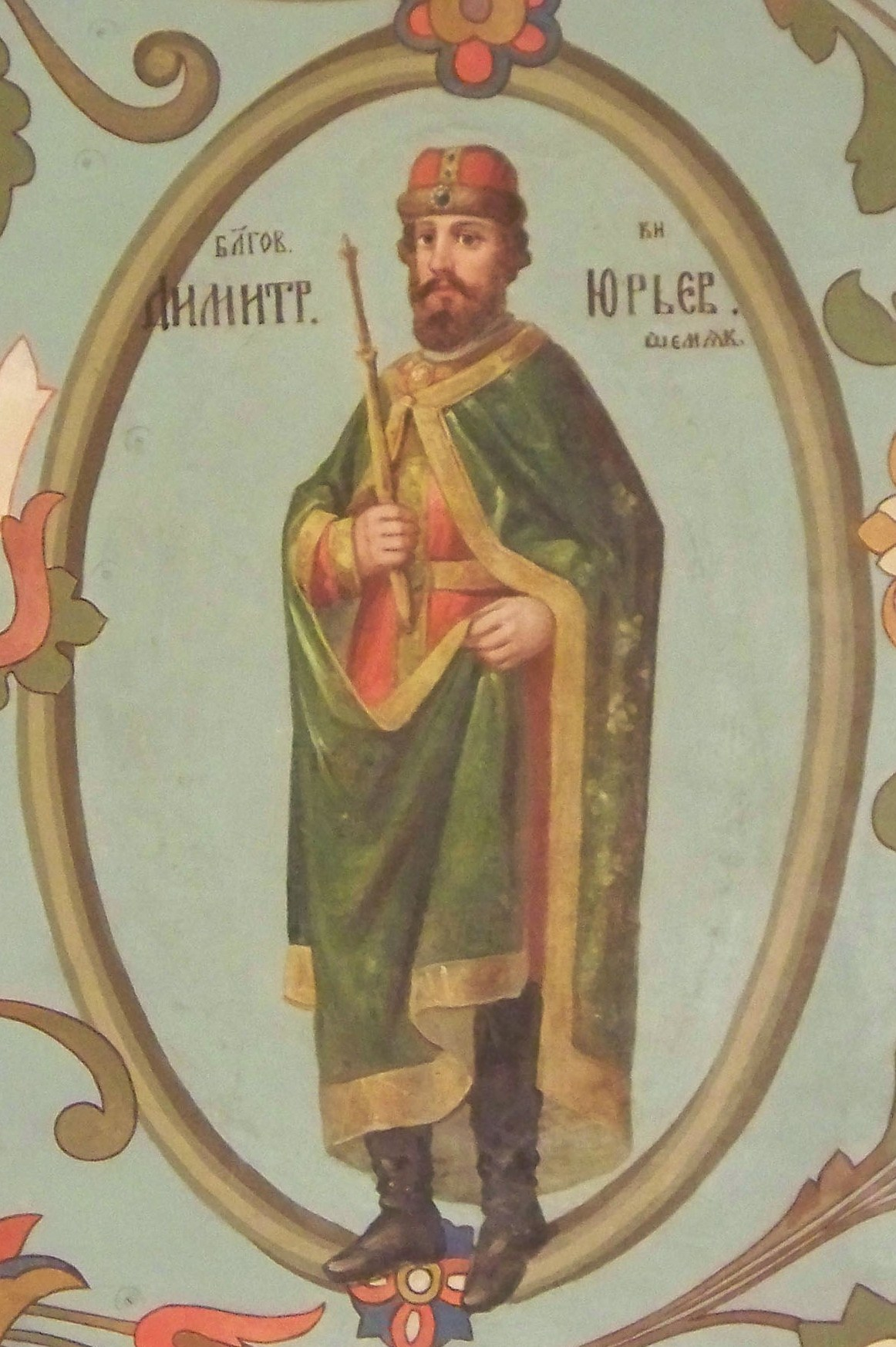
- Prince Dimitry Yurievich Shemyaka. Paradnye Seni (Principal Portal) of State Historical Museum (Moscow), frescoes by Foma Gavrilovich Toropov's artel, 1883.

Grand Prince of Moscow
- Reign: July 7, 1445 - October 26,1445 & February 12, 1446 — February 17, 1447
- Predecessor: Vasily II
- Successor: Vasily II
- Born: Early 15th century possibly Zvenigorod, Grand Duchy of Moscow
- Died: July 17,1453; Novgorod, Novgorod Republic
- Burial: Cathedral of Saint Sophia, the Holy Wisdom of God
- Spouse: Sofia Dmitrievna Zaozerskaya (from the Rostislavichi Yaroslavl family)
- Issue: Ivan, Maria
- House: Rurik
- Father: Yury Dmitrievich of Zvenigorod
- Mother: Anastasia Yurievna of Smolensk
- Religion: Eastern Orthodox

Dmitriy Yurievich Shemyaka (Russian: Дмитрий Юрьевич Шемяка) (died 1453) was the second son of Yury of Zvenigorod by Anastasia of Smolensk and grandson of Dmitri Donskoi. His hereditary patrimony was the rich northern town Galich-Mersky. When his uncle prince Vasily I of Moscow died in 1425, he and his 10-year-old nephew Vasily started fighting over the right to the throne, causing the Muscovite War of Succession (1425–1453). Intermittently, Shemyaka managed to be recognised twice as Prince of Moscow (1445, 1446–1447).

The causes of the Muscovite War of Succession waged in the second quarter of the 15th century are still disputed. No small part, however, was played by Dmitri Donskoi's will, which ran contrary to Rurikid dynastic custom whereby the throne would pass from an elder brother to a younger one (agnatic seniority), rather than from father to son (primogeniture). The testament provided for the accession of his son, Vasily I, which was still in keeping with the tradition of lateral succession since Vasily was the eldest of his generation.

In the event of Vasily having no surviving son at his death, his brother, Dmitry's second son, Yury of Zvenigorod, was to succeed as grand prince in Moscow. Upon Vasily I's death, however, Yury refused to come to Moscow and swear allegiance to his nephew, Vasily II, and claimed the throne himself in accordance with his right under the long-held custom of lateral inheritance. (He further claimed it was provided for in Dmitry's testament – but this ignored the provision that voided Yury's succession in the event of Vasily I producing a son). Yury's son, Dmitry Shemyaka, actively participated in all of his father's incursions against Moscow, culminating in Yury's capture of Moscow and accession as grand prince in 1433. Yury of Zvenigorod died in Moscow in 1434.

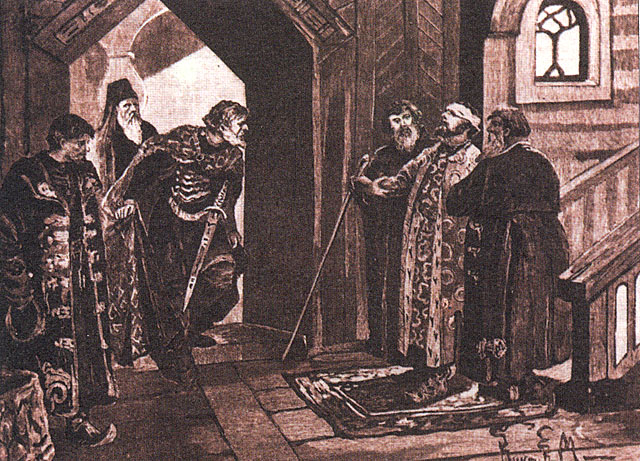
Meeting of Shemyaka with Vasily II after the Latter's Blinding.

After Yury's death, Shemyaka continued to press his branch's claim to the grand princely throne, and was seldom at peace with Vasily II. Initially, Dmitry and his younger brother Dmitry Krasny concluded an alliance with Vasily against their elder brother Vasily Kosoy, who had proclaimed himself grand prince. They succeeded in driving Kosoy from Moscow and were rewarded with the towns of Uglich and Rzhev. The following year Shemyaka came to Moscow in order to invite Vasily II to his impending wedding with a princess of Yaroslavl, but was accused of siding with Kosoy and taken prisoner. He was released on the eve of a decisive clash between Vasily II and Vasily Kosoy. This action of Vasily II was successful – Shemyaka and his people did not help Vasily Kosoy and so he was completely defeated in the battle on the Cheryokha River in 1436, captured and blinded. Soon after, Shemyaka entered into an agreement with Vasily II, recognizing him as his suzerain ("older brother"). Next year, he was sent by Vasily II to expel the exiled Golden Horde Khan Ulugh Muhammad, but was defeated in the battle of Belyov. When Ulugh Muhammad in his turn besieged Moscow in 1439, Dmitry didn't send his troops to Vasily and only the mediation of a Trinity hegumen could forestall a new civil war between the cousins.

The two men maintained an uneasy peace for much of the next decade until 1445, when Vasily II was taken prisoner by Olug Moxammat after the Muscovite forces were surprised by the Tatar prince outside Suzdal, Shemyaka seized Moscow, had the recently released Vasily blinded and proclaimed himself the Grand Prince of Vladimir. He could claim this by right of lateral inheritance since his father had sat on the throne. (A prince was excluded from the succession (izgoi) if his father had not sat on the throne before him.) Shemyaka's lack of support among the Muscovite boyars forced him, however, to leave the city for Lake Chukhloma, but he continued to press his claim to the grand princely throne.

Despite several peace treaties, Shemyaka continued to plot against his cousin. He suffered a series of defeats in 1450 and 1452 which forced him to seek refuge in Novgorod. There, on July 17, 1453, he was poisoned while eating a dinner of chicken in the Gorodishche, the princely compound south of the Market side of the city, his cook having been bribed by Muscovite agents. Delighted at the news, Vasily II ennobled a herald who had first brought him the message of Shemyaka's death. Nikolai Karamzin famously wrote in his history that the grand prince showed "indecent joy" at the news of his rival's untimely demise.

According to chronicle sources, Shemyaka was buried in the Church of St. George in the Yuriev Monastery south of Novgorod, however, twentieth-century archaeological excavations of the necropolis of the Cathedral of Holy Wisdom in the Novgorod Kremlin suggest that the prince was actually buried there and his grave has been misidentified since at least 1616 as that of Prince Fedor Yaroslavich (died 1233).

In the aftermath of Shemyaka's murder, his wife and son fled Novgorod to the Grand Duchy of Lithuania, where they were given Rylsk and Novgorod-Seversky in appanage.

Shemyaka's male line died out by 1561, but there are many living descendants from his daughter's marriage to Prince Alexander Chertoryzhsky.

Shemyaka's name survives in the Russian expression "Shemyakin sud" ("Shemyaka's Justice", "Shemyaka's Judgement"), which means hasty and unfair judgement. It comes from the 17th century literary work The Tale of Shemyaka's Judgement (see its translation here). However modern researchers question the identification of Dmitry Shemyaka with Judge Shemyaka in the tale.

== Ancestry ==
Ancestors of Dmitry Shemyaka

8. Ivan II of Moscow
4. Dmitry Donskoy
9. Alexandra Velyaminova
2. Yury of Zvenigorod
10. Dmitry of Suzdal
5. Eudoxia of Moscow
11. Vasilisa of Rostov
1.Dmitry Shemyaka
12. Svyatoslav IV Ivanovich of Smolensk
6. Yury of Smolensk
3. Anastasia of Smolensk
14. Oleg II of Ryazan
7. Alyona of Ryazan
15. Euphrosyne of Lithuania

== Sources ==
- Zimin, Aleksandr (1991). Витязь на распутье. Феодальная война в России XV в. [The Knight at the Crossroads. The feudal war in Russia of the 15th century]. Moscow: Мысль. ISBN 5-244-00518-9.

Regnal titles
Preceded by Vasily II	Grand Prince of Moscow; 1446–1447	Succeeded by Vasily II
