= Yury of Zvenigorod =

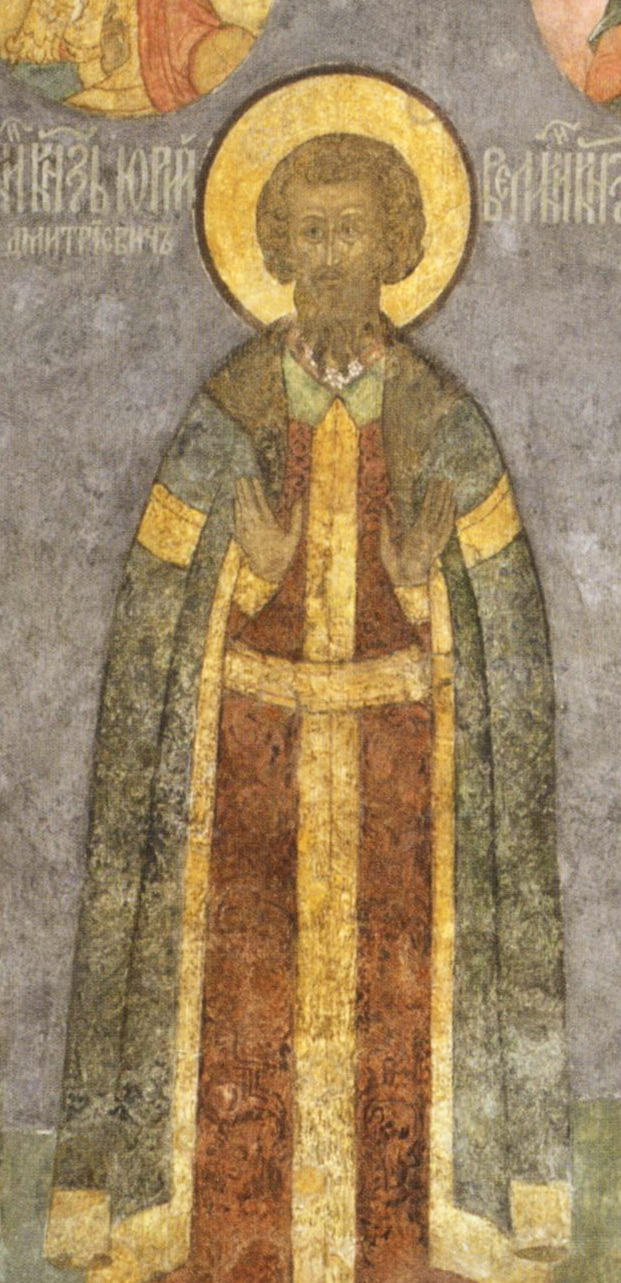
- Portrait from the Cathedral of the Archangel (17th century)

Grand Prince of Moscow
- Predecessor: Vasily II
- Successor: Vasily Kosoy
- Born: 26 November 1374; Pereslavl, Grand Duchy of Moscow
- Died: 5 June 1434 (aged 59); Galich
- Burial: Cathedral of the Archangel, Moscow Kremlin
- Consort: Anastasya Yurievna
- Issue: Vasily Kosoy; Dmitry Shemyaka; Dmitry Krasny
- Dynasty: Rurik
- Father: Dmitry Donskoy
- Mother: Eudoxia Dmitriyevna
- Religion: Russian Orthodox

Yury Dmitrievich (Russian: Юрий Дмитриевич; 1374 – 1434), also known as George II of Moscow, Yury of Zvenigorod and Jurij Zwenihorodski (Russian: Юрий Звенигородский), was the second son of Dmitry Donskoy. He was the Duke of Zvenigorod and Galich from 1389 until his death. During the reign of his brother Vasily I, he took part in the campaigns against Torzhok (1392), Zhukotin (1414), and Novgorod (1417). He was the chief orchestrator of the Muscovite Civil War against his nephew, Vasily II, in the course of which he twice took Moscow, in 1433 and 1434.

== Family ==
By his wife, Anastasia, the daughter of Yury of Smolensk, Yury IV had three sons — Vasily Kosoy, Dmitry Shemyaka, and Dmitry Krasny. The marriage to Anastasia made him the brother-in-law of Švitrigaila, Grand Duke of Lithuania.

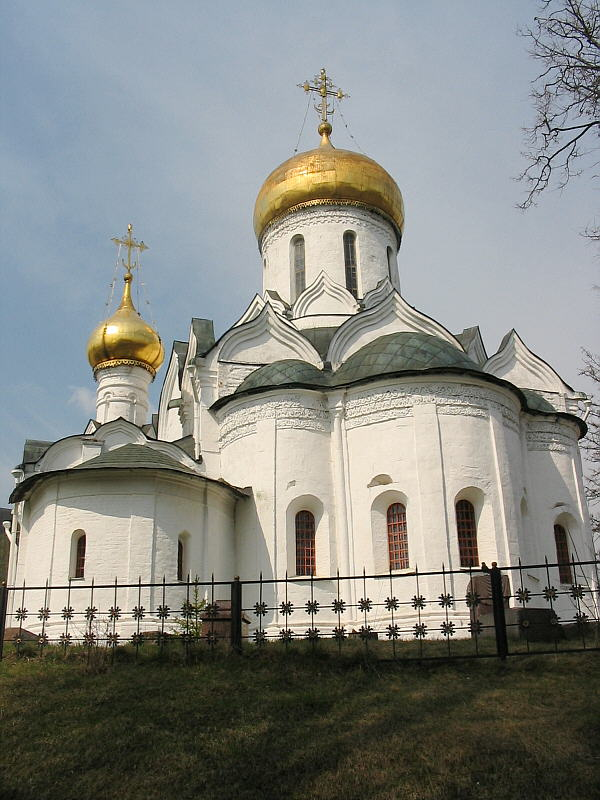
The Nativity Cathedral built by Yury in Zvenigorod ca. 1405.

== Inheritance and claims ==
At his father's death, Yury received in appanage the towns of Zvenigorod, Ruza, and Galich.

Upon his brother's death, Yury immediately asserted his claim to the throne of Muscovy against that of Vasily's son, Vasily II. He referenced the old house law of the House of Rurik, whereby the senior throne in the dynasty passed from brother to brother, rather than from father to son. He also interpreted in his favour the testament of Dmitry Donskoy, written at the time when Vasily had been unmarried and childless.

== Treaty with Vasily II ==
In 1430, Yury and his nephew decided that the issue would be settled in the Golden Horde. The Khan supported the claim of Vasily II, but allowed Yury to take the appanage of his deceased younger brother, Peter of Dmitrov. This decision did not fully satisfy Vasily, who took Dmitrov by force and expelled Yury's governor from the town in 1432. In response, Yury rallied his forces and advanced on Pereslavl-Zalessky. Vasily II was defeated on the bank of the Klyazma River and fled to Kostroma. After that, Yury entered Moscow in triumph and proclaimed himself Grand Duke.

Instead of imprisoning his nephew, Yury allowed him to settle in Kolomna and rule the town as his appanage. This show of magnanimity cost him dearly, as scores of Muscovite boyars and noblemen fled to Vasily's court in Kolomna. This shift in momentum impelled Yury to conclude a treaty with Vasily, whereby the uncle renounced his claims to Moscow, promised to deny assistance to his sons, and exchanged Dmitrov for other territories. Vasily returned to Moscow, while Yury withdrew to Galich.

== Further conflicts ==
The following year, Kosoy and Shemyaka defeated Vasily II on the banks of the Kus River. The grand prince was informed that Yury's troops had been seen among his enemies and decided to punish him for this treachery. In winter 1434, he set Galich ablaze, but Yury had escaped northward to Belozersk. On 16 March, the armies of the uncle and the nephew clashed between Rostov and Pereslavl. Vasily's army was roundly defeated and he sought refuge in Nizhny Novgorod.

On 31 March 1434, on the Bright Week Wednesday, Yury again entered Moscow, where he captured Vasily's family and treasury. He was preparing a new campaign against Vasily when he died suddenly, on 5 July 1434, succeeded by his eldest son, Vasily Kosoy.

Regnal titles
| Preceded by Vasily II | Grand Prince of Moscow; 1433–1434 | Succeeded by Vasily Kosoy |
Russian royalty
| Preceded by Daniil Dmitrievich | Heir to the Russian Throne; 1389–1433 | Succeeded by Vasily Kosoy |
