= Skoryatino =

Skoryatino Скорятино
- Village
- Location within Vologda Oblast Location within Russia
- Coordinates: 60°40′N 45°44′E
- Country: Russia
- Region: Vologda Oblast
- District: Velikoustyugsky District
- Time zone: UTC+3:00

Skoryatino (Russian: Скорятино) is a rural locality (a village) in Nizhnerogodskoye Rural Settlement, Velikoustyugsky District, Vologda Oblast, Russia. The population was 8 as of 2002.

== Geography ==
Skoryatino is located 43 km southwest of Veliky Ustyug (the district's administrative centre) by road. Davydovskoye is the nearest rural locality.
