= Vasily Kosoy =

Grand Prince of Moscow

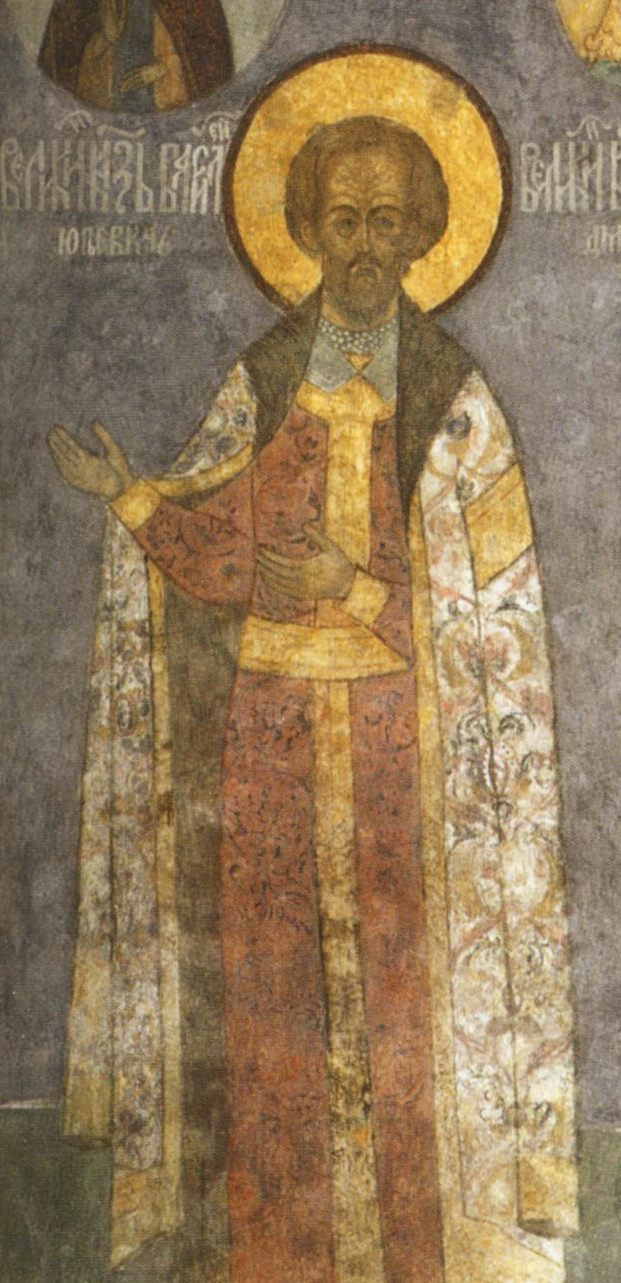
Vasily Kosoy; fresco from the Cathedral of the Archangel (1666)

Vasiliy Yuryevich Kosoy (the Squint) (Russian: Василий Юрьевич Косой; c. 1401–1448) was prince of Zvenigorod from 1421. He continued his father's claim on the title of Grand Prince of Moscow in 1434.

== Life ==
Vasily Kosoy was the son of Yury Dmitrievich and Anastasia of Smolensk. His grandfather was Dmitry Donskoy who settled the issue of crown inheritance by passing a law according to which his oldest son Vasily I would become Grand Prince after his death and the second in line would be Donskoy's younger son Yury Dmitrievich. After coming to power, Kosoy's uncle Vasily I changed these laws so that his sons became crown heirs and not Kosoy's father. This decision resulted in two civil wars between the older and younger Dmitry Donskoy line.

In the beginning, Yury Dmitrievich accepted the rule of Vasily II's regency, but when the ruler became of age in 1433, he started a rebellion. Yury Dmitrievich defeated the forces of Vasily II and proclaimed himself Grand Prince of Moscow. Shortly after this victory, he died in 1434 and Vasily Kosoy became Grand Prince. This change of leadership resulted in the revolt of Dmitry Shemyaka who refused to accept his brother's rule. Shemyaka united his forces with Vasily II and defeated Vasily Kosoy who escaped Moscow in 1435. The decisive battle of this civil war was fought on 14 May 1436 near the village of Skoryatin in the Rostov province where Kosoy was defeated, imprisoned and shortly afterwards blinded.

== Ancestors ==
Ancestors of Vasily Kosoy

Ivan II of Moscow
Dmitry Donskoy
Alexandra Velyaminova
Yury Dmitriyevich of Zvenigorod
Dmitry Konstantinovich of Suzdal
Yevdokia Dmitriyevna
Anna
Vasily Yuryevich
Svyatoslav Ivanovich of Smolensk
Yury Svyatoslavich of Smolensk
Anastasia Yuryevna
Oleg II of Ryazan
Alyona Olegovna
Yefrosinya

== See also ==
- Muscovite Civil War

Regnal titles
Preceded by Yury Dmitrievich	Grand Prince of Moscow; 1434–1435	Succeeded by Vasily II
