= Zvenigorod =

Town in Moscow Oblast, Russia

Zvenigorod Звенигород
- Town
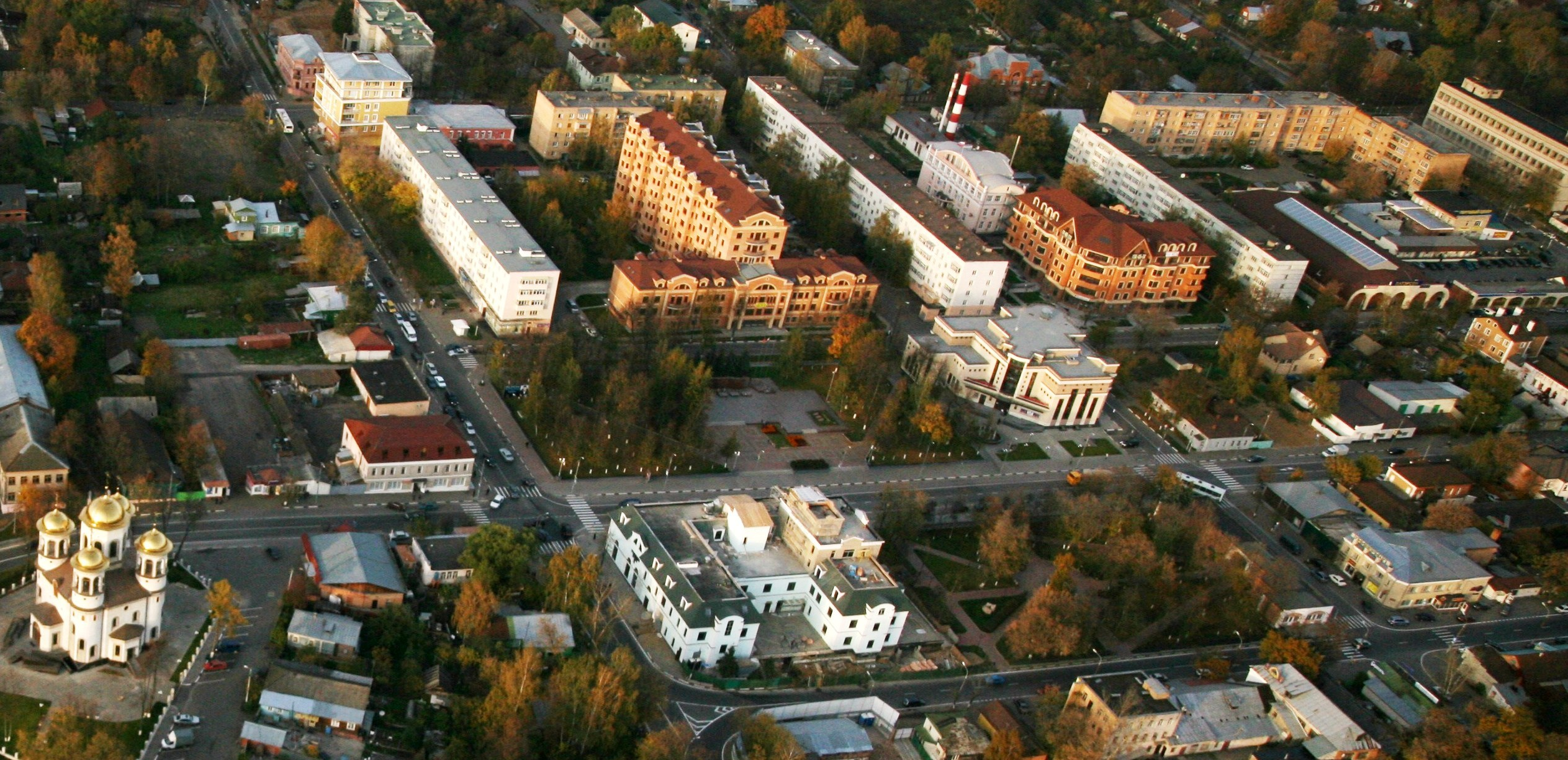

- Flag Coat of arms
- Interactive map of Zvenigorod
- Location of Zvenigorod Zvenigorod (Moscow Oblast)
- Coordinates: 55°44′N 36°51′E
- Country: Russia
- Federal subject: Moscow Oblast
- First mentioned: 1338
- Town status since: 1784

Area
  - Total: 48.1 km^{2} (18.6 sq mi)
- Elevation: 150 m (490 ft)

Population (2010 Census)
  - Total: 16,395
  - Estimate (2025): 37,915 (+131.3%)
  - Density: 341/km^{2} (883/sq mi)

Administrative status
  - Subordinated to: Zvenigorod Town Under Oblast Jurisdiction
  - Capital of: Zvenigorod Town Under Oblast Jurisdiction

Municipal status
  - Urban okrug: Zvenigorod Urban Okrug
  - Capital of: Zvenigorod Urban Okrug
- Time zone: UTC+3 (MSK)
- Postal code: 143180–143185
- Dialing code: +7 49869
- OKTMO ID: 46755000011

Zvenigorod (Russian: Звени́город) is a town in the Moscow Oblast of western Russia. In 2010 it had a population of about 16,000.

== History ==
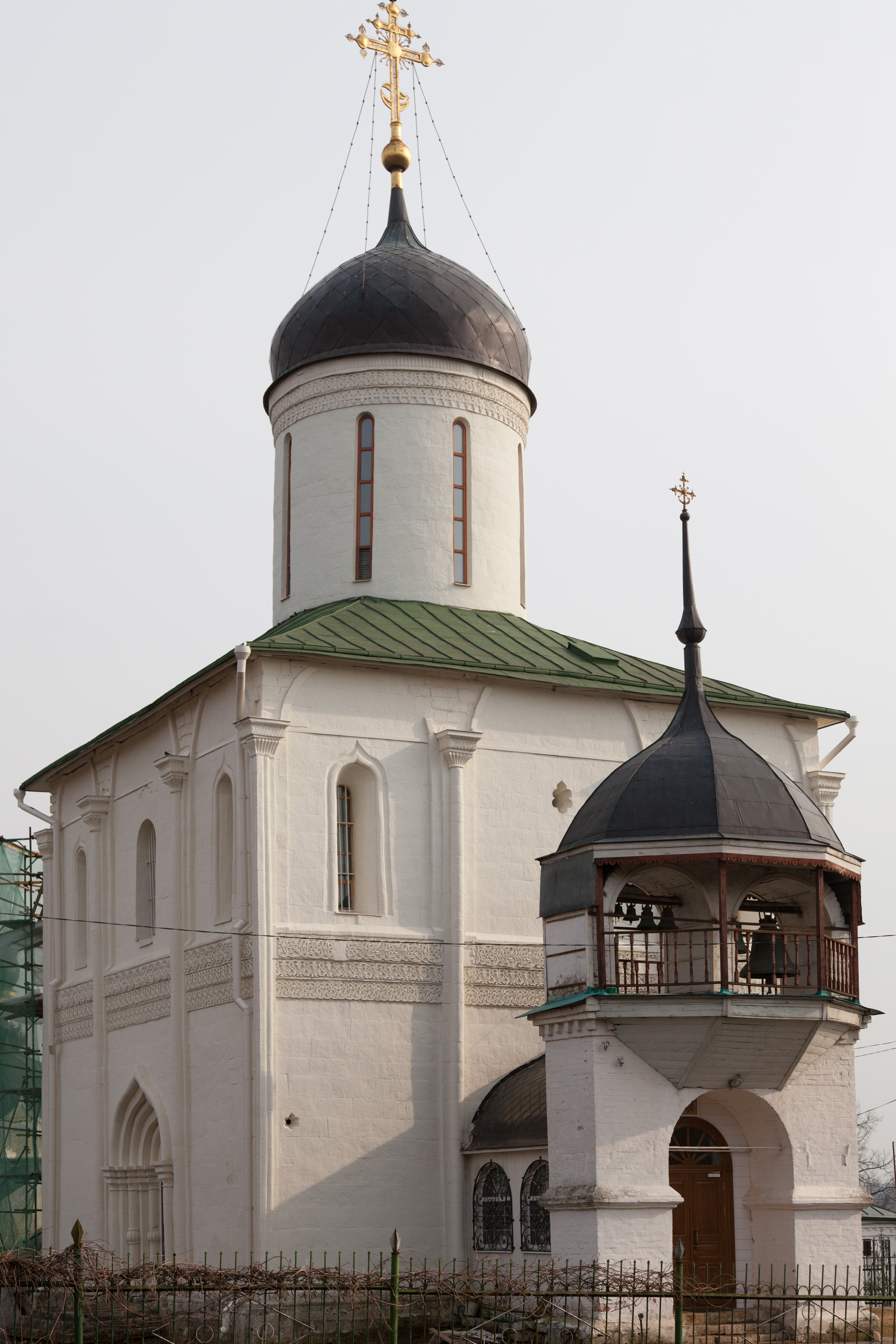
The Dormition Cathedral in the Kremlin was consecrated in 1399.

The town's name is based either on a personal name (cf. Zvenislav, Zvenimir) or on a hydronym (cf. the Zvinech, Zvinyaka, Zveniga Rivers); the derivation from "town of ringing (bells)" is a folk etymology.

The community has existed since the 12th century, although its first written mention is dated around 1339, in the last will of Grand Duke of Moscow Ivan I Daniilovich Kalita, in which he says: "Thus, I pass on to my son Ivan: Zvenigorod, Kremchina, Ruza..." In the historical records, or annals (лéтопись [letopis'] in Russian), Zvenigorod is first mentioned around 1382, soon after khan Tokhtamysh burnt down Moscow, and destroyed a number of towns on the way, including Zvenigorod.

Zvenigorod rose to prominence in the late 14th century after it was bequeathed by Dmitry Donskoy to his second son Yuri, who founded his residence on the steep bank of the Moskva River. The local kremlin, called Gorodok, contains the only fully preserved example of 14th-century Muscovite architecture, the Dormition Cathedral (1399). The cathedral's interior features frescoes attributed to Andrei Rublev.

Zvenigorod is primarily remembered for internecine wars waged by Yuri's sons for control of Moscow during the reign of their cousin Vasily II (1425–1462). After their party was defeated, the town was incorporated into the Grand Duchy of Moscow.

Zvenigorod was granted town rights in 1784. By the late 19th century, the town gained popularity among the intelligentsia as a fashionable banlieue of Moscow. Many extravagant dachas were built in the neighbourhood. Some of these house museums of Sergey Taneyev, Anton Chekhov, and Isaac Levitan.

During World War II Zvenigorod was near, or on the frontline in the 1941-2 Battle of Moscow.

=== Savvino-Storozhevsky Monastery ===
The Storozhi Monastery near Zvenigorod was established in 1398 by St. Savva, one of the first disciples of Sergius of Radonezh. The oldest church is the katholikon completed in 1405 and dedicated to the feast of the Nativity of the Theotokos. In 1650, the monastery was chosen by Tsar Alexis as his suburban residence. In five years, they constructed a white-stone royal palace and a festive chamber for tsaritsa. The compound was encircled with stone walls and towers, patterned after those of the Trinity Lavra of St. Sergius. Particularly noteworthy is a large belfry, erected in four bays in 1650 and crowned with three tents and a clocktower. A church over the holy gates was consecrated to the Holy Trinity in 1652.

After the death of Feodor III, who spent most of his time there, the monastery declined. In May 1918, when the Bolsheviks tried to seize the relics of St. Savva, several persons were shot dead. In 1985, the cloister was assigned to the Danilov Monastery in Moscow. St. Savva's relics were returned to the monastery in 1998.

== Administrative and municipal status ==
Within the framework of administrative divisions, it is incorporated as Zvenigorod Town Under Oblast Jurisdiction—an administrative unit with the status equal to that of the districts. As a municipal division, Zvenigorod Town Under Oblast Jurisdiction is incorporated as Zvenigorod Urban Okrug.

== Population ==
16,395 (2010 census);[2] 12,155 (2002 census);[12] 15,805 (1989 Soviet census).[13]

== International relations ==
=== Twin towns — Sister cities ===
Zvenigorod is twinned with:

- Mogilev, Belarus (2006)
- Tropea, Italy (2013)
- Bijie, China (2016)
