= Galich, Russia =

Town in Kostroma Oblast, Russia

Galich Галич
- Town
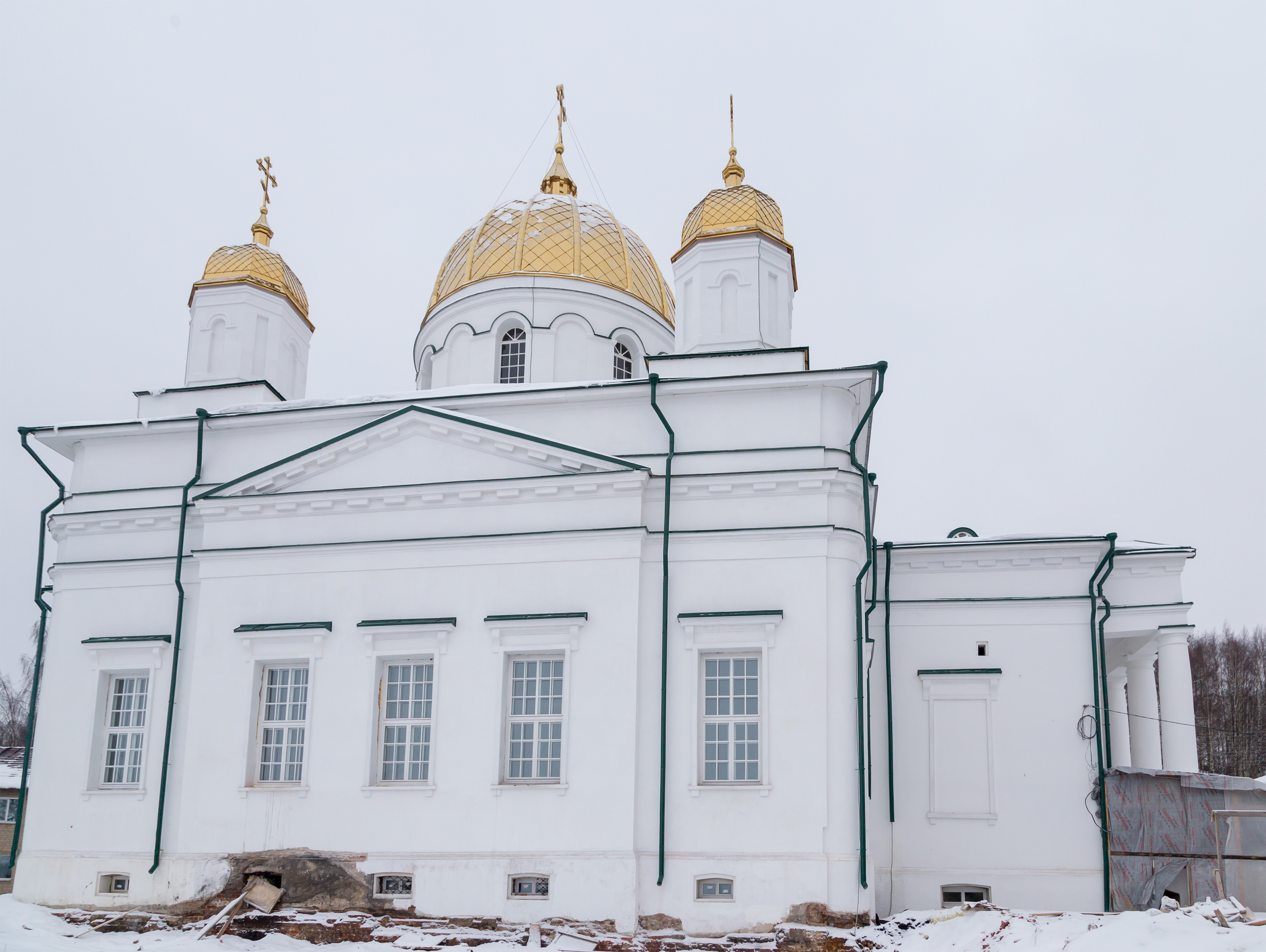
- View of Galich

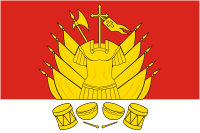
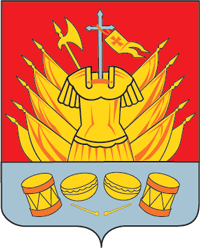
- Flag Coat of arms
- Interactive map of Galich
- Location of Galich Galich (Europe)
- Coordinates: 58°23′N 42°21′E
- Country: Russia
- Federal subject: Kostroma Oblast
- First mentioned: 1234
- Town status since: 1778
- Elevation: 130 m (430 ft)

Population (2010 Census)
  - Total: 17,346
  - Estimate (2021): 12,856 (−25.9%)

Administrative status
  - Subordinated to: town of oblast significance of Galich
  - Capital of: Galichsky District, town of oblast significance of Galich

Municipal status
  - Urban okrug: Galich Urban Okrug
  - Capital of: Galich Urban Okrug, Galichsky Municipal District
- Time zone: UTC+3 (MSK)
- Postal codes: 157200–157203, 157209, 157229
- Dialing code: +7 49437
- OKTMO ID: 34708000001
- Website: www.admgalich.ru

Galich population
- 2021 Census: 12,856
- 2010 Census: 17,346
- 2002 Census: 19,151
- 1989 Census: 21,652
- 1979 Census: 21,270

Galich (Russian: Га́лич) is a town in Kostroma Oblast, Russia, located on the southern bank of Lake Galichskoye. As of the 2021 Census, its population was 12,856.

== History ==
It was first chronicled in 1234 as Grad Mersky (lit. the town of the Merya). It gradually developed into one of the greatest salt-mining centers of Eastern Europe, eclipsing the southern town of Halych, from which it takes its name. In the 13th century, Galich was ruled by a younger brother of Alexander Nevsky and remained in his line until 1363, when the Muscovites seized the principality and ousted the ruling family to Novgorod.

The 15th and 16th centuries are justly considered the golden age of Galich. At that time it controlled most of the Russian trade in salt and furs. Dmitry Shemyaka and other local princes pressed their claims to the Muscovite crown, and three of them actually took possession of the Kremlin in the course of the Great Feudal War.

The early medieval earthen ramparts were further fortified in the early 15th and 16th centuries and have since been known as Shemyaka Hills. The Poles burnt it to the ground in 1612, Peter the Great had a wooden kremlin demolished, and it further declined with the transfer of Russian foreign trade from Arkhangelsk to St. Petersburg.

Town status was granted to Galich in 1778.

== Administrative and municipal status ==
Within the framework of administrative divisions, Galich serves as the administrative center of Galichsky District, even though it is not a part of it. As an administrative division, it is incorporated separately as the town of oblast significance of Galich—an administrative unit with the status equal to that of the districts. As a municipal division, the town of oblast significance of Galich is incorporated as Galich Urban Okrug.

== Economy ==
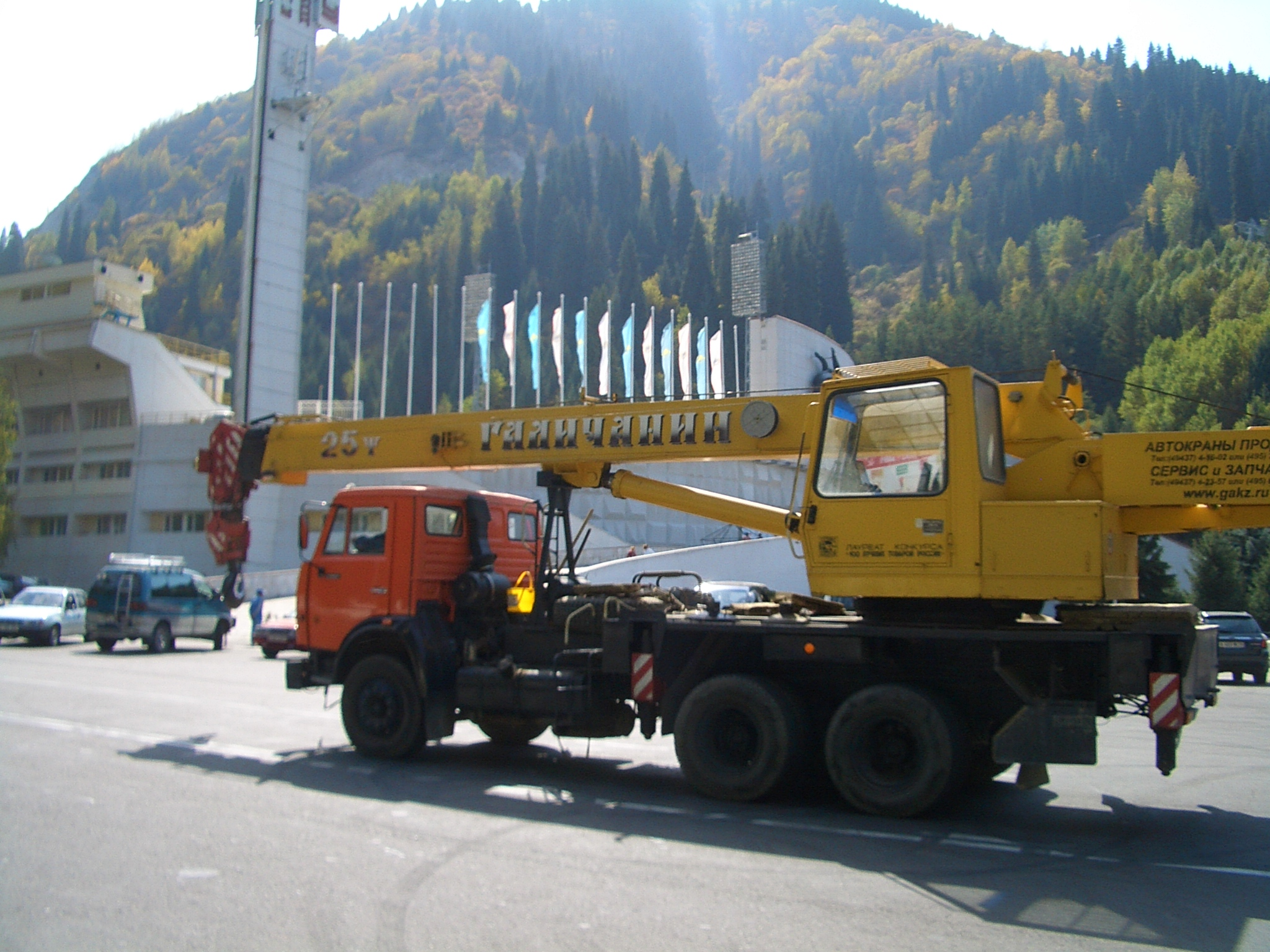
Galich-made Galichanin cranes can be encountered as far away as in Medeo, Kazakhstan

The Galich Mobile Crane Plant (Russian: ОАО "Галичский автокрановый завод") manufactures some 20% of Russia's entire mobile crane production.

Town's industries also manufacture steel barrels, shoes, and clothing. There is a timber mill in town as well.

The town is also a minor railroad node of the Trans-Siberian Railway.

A 350-meter (1,150 ft) tall guyed mast for FM and TV broadcasting can be seen in the town.

== Culture ==
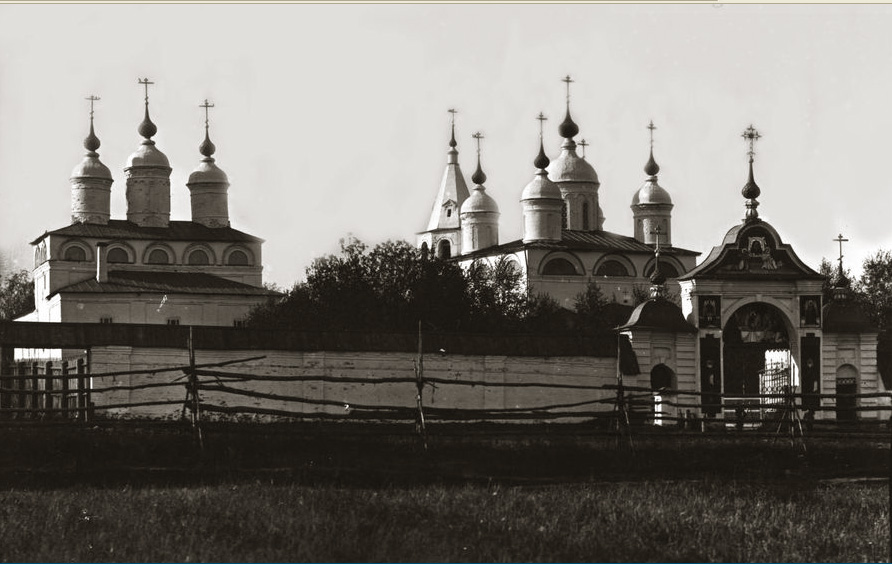
The churches of the St. Paisiy Monastery date from the 16th and 17th centuries

Historic monuments of Galich include various buildings from the imperial period of Russian history. Particularly noteworthy is the Saint Paisiy Monastery, founded in the early 14th century and featuring a 16th-century five-domed cathedral and a three-domed church from 1642.

Since 2004, Galich hosts the annual short film festival "Russia's Family" (Russian: Семья России, Semya Rossii), whose stated goals are "to aid spiritual and moral healing of Russian society and to promote traditional family values".
