= Sheremetyevskaya =

Sheremetyevskaya may refer to:

== People ==
- Natalia Brasova (1880–1952), Russian noblewoman, born Natalia Sergeyevna Sheremetyevskaya

== Transport ==
- Sheremetyevskaya (Moscow Metro), on the Bolshaya Koltsevaya line
- Sheremetyevskaya railway station, on the Savyolovsky line of the Moscow Railway
