= Sheremetyevsky =

Sheremetyevskiy Шереметьевский
- Microdistrict
- Interactive map of Sheremetyevskiy
- Location of Sheremetyevskiy Sheremetyevskiy (European Russia) Sheremetyevskiy (Europe)
- Coordinates: 55°59′05″N 37°29′45″E
- Country: Russia
- Federal subject: Moscow Oblast
- Founded: 1901
- Microdistrict status since: 2003

Population (2010 Census)
  - Total: 6,500
  - Estimate (2002): 6,464 (−0.6%)

Administrative status
  - Subordinated to: Dolgoprudny Town Under Oblast Jurisdiction

Municipal status
  - Urban okrug: Dolgoprudny Urban Okrug
- Postal code: 141700
- Dialing code: +7 495

Sheremetyevsky (Russian: Шереметьевский), also known as Sheremetyevo (Russian: Шереметьево), Sheremetyevka (Russian: Шереметьевка) is currently (since 2003) a microdistrict of the city of Dolgoprudny in the Moscow Oblast, located near the Sheremetyevskaya railway station of the Savyolovsky line of the Moscow Railway. Sheremetyevo International Airport takes its name from this village, although the village is located several kilometers to the east of the airport.

== History ==
The settlement of Sheremetyevsky arose around 1901 as a dachas area near the Sheremetyevskaya railway station on forest lands belonging to Count Sergey Sheremetev.

Until 1934, the settlement of Sheremetyevsky consisted of seven dachas, "once owned by the Mikheyevs, Vasilyevs and others". According to the All-Union Population Census of 1926, there were 16 households in the settlement of Sheremetyevsky (15 of which were peasant households), in which 74 people lived (37 men and 37 women).

The settlement began to develop intensively in 1934, when as a result of the construction of the Moscow Canal on the territory of the Moscow Oblast, a significant part of it was flooded. In connection with this, some settlements were subject to abolition, and the residents were resettled. The village of Khlebnikovo was flooded, partly the dacha settlement of Khlebnikovo and the village of Kotovo in the Kommunistichesky District (Moscow Oblast). Residential buildings from the flood zone were moved to the settlement of Sheremetyevsky by the canal builders.

Due to the transfer of old houses from the flood zone and the construction of new ones, by 1939 there were already 375 houses with 5,500 residents in the settlement of Sheremetyevsky.

On January 4, 1939, the Krasnopolyansky District of the Moscow Oblast was formed with the administrative center in the workers' settlement of Krasnaya Polyana. This district included the territory of the Trudovy and Kommunistichesky Districts (from the Little Ring of the Moscow Railway to Bely Rast), including the dacha settlements of Khlebnikovo and Sheremetyevsky.

On March 26, 1939, by decree of the Presidium of the Supreme Soviet of the RSFSR, the official status was approved, the dacha settlement of Sheremetyevsky.

=== Officers' settlement ===
After the victory in the Great Patriotic War, in accordance with the Decree of the Council of People's Commissars of the Soviet Union, "in order to improve housing conditions" for honored generals and officers of the Red Army, construction of dacha "officer settlements" began in a number of areas of the Moscow Oblast

In the settlement of Sheremetyevsky, plots for the construction of dachas for the officer settlement were allocated on the territory adjacent to the railway line, from the Sheremetyevskaya railway platform in the direction of the village of Sumarokovo.

Along the road to the station (now Gorky Street), veterans of the Great Patriotic War, residents of the new settlement planted a birch alley. In memory of their military past, the streets of the settlement were named Ofitserskaya and Tankistov. Glazunova Street is named in honor of twice Hero of the Soviet Union, Lieutenant General Vasily Glazunov. One of the streets is named after Major General of Tank Troops Pyotr Nikolaevich Yesin.

On the 65th anniversary of the end of the war, a memorial marble stele with the names of 82 former residents of the village who contributed to the Great Victory was erected at the intersection of Gorky and Magistralnaya Streets. Among the residents were Vasily Glazunov and Efim Shchadenko.

=== Administrative subordination ===
Until mid-1959, the Sheremetyevsky dacha settlement was part of the Krasnopolyansky District of the Moscow Oblast, with the city of Dolgoprudny as the district center.

In June 1959, the Krasnopolyansky District was abolished, and its territory was included in the Khimki District. The city of Dolgoprudny and the Sheremetyevsky settlement were transferred to the Khimki District, which became one of the largest districts of the Moscow Oblast.

In December 1960, the Sheremetyevsky dacha settlement became part of the Mytishchinsky District. Dolgoprudny remained part of the Khimki District.

In February 1963, the rural area became part of the enlarged Mytishchi rural district. The Sheremetyevsky dacha settlement came under the administrative subordination of the city of Dolgoprudny.

In July 1973, the dacha settlement of Sheremetyevsky was transformed into a workers' settlement with the same name, while it remained under the administrative control of the city of regional subordination Dolgoprudny.

In August 2003, the workers' settlement of Sheremetyevsky and the village of Paveltsevo were included in the city of Dolgoprudny.

== Economy ==
The microdistrict is home to a theatrical accessories factory, a brick factory (Khlebnikovsky Brick Factory), and the Vegetta fruit and vegetable base (sometimes the Khlebnikovskaya Vegetable Base, formerly the Timiryazevskaya Vegetable Base). The vegetable base is one of the three largest fruit and vegetable bases in Moscow and the surrounding oblast. There is a customs terminal next to the base.
