= Gennady Volkov =

Russian scientist

Gennady Aleksandrovich Volkov (Russian: Геннадий Александрович Волков), born on March 14, 1964, in Lobnya, Russia, is a doctor of Juridical Science, Professor of the Department of Environmental and Land Law of Lomonosov Moscow State University Faculty of Law.

== Education ==
He entered the Faculty of Law of Lomonosov Moscow State University in 1985 and graduated with honors in 1990.

He studied full-time at the graduate school of the abovementioned faculty in the Department of Environmental and Land Law from 1990 to 1993.

He defended the candidate's dissertation on the "Peasant Household as a Subject of Land Relations: Historical and Legal Aspects" (thesis supervisor – Prof. V.V. Petrov) on December 24, 1993. The defense took place at the Faculty of Law of Lomonosov Moscow State University.

Gennady Volkov was awarded the academic title of Associate Professor by the decision of the Ministry of Education of the Russian Federation on December 15, 1999. He defended the doctoral thesis on the "Principles of Land Law" on June 8, 2005. The defense took place at the Faculty of Law of Lomonosov Moscow State University.

Gennady Volkov was awarded the academic title of Doctor of Juridical Science by the decision of the Higher Attestation Commission of the Russian Federation Ministry of Education and Science on October 21, 2005.

== Career ==
Gennady Volkov has been working at the Faculty of Law since September 1, 1993. He gives lecture courses "Land Law" (since 1997) and "Environmental Law" (since 1995), including within a framework of the Faculty of Law International Legal Programme at the International Center of Lomonosov Moscow State University (Geneva, Switzerland). He gives the following special courses: "Topical Issues of the Natural Resources Law," "Legal Issues of Water Resources Use and Protection," "Legal Issues of Subsoil Use and Protection," and "Legal Regime of Moscow lands."

He undertook an internship at the Faculty of Law of Budapest University (alternative name – Lorand Eotvos University / "Eötvös Loránd Tudományegyetem" in Hungarian).

Gennady Volkov worked at the Faculty of Law in capacity of Teaching Assistant of the Department of Environmental and Land Law from September 1, 1993, to December 31, 1996, and associate professor of the abovementioned department from January 1, 1997. He has been Professor of the Department of Environmental and Land Law of Lomonosov Moscow State University Faculty of Law from 2008 to the present day.

Gennady Volkov is a member of Lomonosov Moscow State University Dissertation Councils: D 501.001.99 (at the Faculty of Law) and D501.001.08 (at the Faculty of Economics). He held a position as a legal advisor in a subsidiary of LUKOIL company, a consultant of the Russian Federation State Duma Committee on Natural Resources and Environmental Management, and a non-staff expert of the State Property Committee of Russia and the State Committee for Land Policy of Russia.

== Legislative activity ==
He took part in developing projects of the Russian Federation Urban Planning Code 1998, the Russian Federation Land Code of 2001, the Russian Federation Water Code of 2006, the federal law "On Agricultural Land Transactions," subsoil law, laws of Moscow and Saint Petersburg. He participated in developing the basic draft of the General Part of the Russian Federation Environmental Code in 2006 and 2007, as well as developing the basic draft of the Russian Federation Environmental Code Special Part in 2007 and 2008.

Gennady Volkov serves as a consultant of Russian and foreign companies on the issues of natural resources use and protection, environmental protection, legal regime of land plots and other real estate units. He is an active lawyer and a partner of Reznik, Gagarin, and Partners law bureau.

== Academic papers ==
He is the author of more than 60 published research papers including one monograph, six commentaries to legislative acts, one commentary to the Russian Federation Presidential Decree, a textbook, and more than 15 study guides (co-authorship). Selected papers:

- "Commentary to the Russian Federation Presidential Decrees Ensuring Constitutional Rights of Citizens and Legal Entities to Land for the Period from 1991 to 1996" // Legislation. 1996. # 2. P.8–25 (co-authorship with G.A. Volkov);
- "Legal Regulation of State Ownership of Natural Resources" // State and law. 1996. # 9. P. 52–59;
- "Property Right to Land. Issues of Regulation" // Principal Directions and Prospects for the Russian Legislation Further Development in the Field of Social and Economic Relations. М.: Chamber of Commerce and Industry of the Russian Federation. 1996. P.12–17;
- "Land Market Development: Legal Aspects" // Status and law. 1998. # 2. P. 50–58 (co-authorship with A.K. Golichenkov and O.M. Kozyr);
- "Pollution Charge: Who is Paying?" // Economy and law. 1998. # 1. P. 74–79;
- "On Unifying and Systematizing the Set of Legal Norms Regulating Land Relations" // Environmental Law of Russia. Digest of Research and Practice Conferences of 1995–1998. Study guide. М., 1999. P. 13–137;
- "Issues of State Registration of Real Estate Rights and Transactions" // Environmental Law of Russia. Digest of Research and Practice Conferences of 1995–1998. Study guide. М., 1999. P. 355–358;
- "Issues of the Acquisition of Land Ownership Rights Based on Length of Ownership" // The Moscow University Herald. Series 11. Law. 2000. # 1. P.17–25;
- "Legal Regulation of the Framework of Financing Environmental Protection Measures: State and Development Trends" // Legislation. 2000. # 8. С. 10–17;
- "Legislation on Biodiversity Use and Protection." Analytical review. Federal legislation. М.: GEOS, 2001. – 407 p. (co-authorship);
- "Improving the System of Ensuring the Title to Real Property" // Property relations in the Russian Federation. 2002. # 5. P. 86–96 (co-authorship);
- "Land Code of the Russian Federation." Article-by-article academic and practical commentary. М.: Agency "Russian Gazette Library." 2002 – 352 p. (co-authorship with Gennady Volkov and A.K. Golichenkov);
- Commentary to the Russian Federation Land Code. Supplement to the monthly magazine for business people "Economy and Law." 2002. Supplements #1 and #2. – 172 p. (co-authorship with G.A. Volkov and O.M. Kozyr);
- Commentary to the Russian Federation Land Code / Edited by A.K. Golichenkov. М.: BEK Publishing House, 2002 – 448 p. (co-authorship with G.A. Volkov and O.M. Kozyr);
- Commentary to the federal law "On Wildlife" in questions and answers / Edited by A.I. Saurin. М.: Statut, 2003 – 112 p. (co-authorship with G.A. Volkov, N.A. Gagarin, A.N. Krokhin and A.I. Saurin);
- Commentary to the federal law "On Agricultural Land Transactions" // М.: Wolters Kluwer, 2004. – 112 p.;
- "Principles of Land Law." М.: "Gorodets" Publishing House, 2005. – 334 p.

Most papers written by Gennady Volkov are on fundamental theoretical and practical issues in the field of land law (especially basic land law), environmental law, water law, legal aspects of the real estate market development, legal issues of the framework for natural environment protection, planning land use in towns and other residential areas (legal aspects). Selected recent papers:

- "Protection of Rights to the Declaratively Reckoned Land Plots. Legal Regulation of Land Development." // Materials of the international research and practice conference dedicated to the centennial of the law "On Land Development." (GUZ, October 25, 2011). P.57–63;
- "Codification of Legislation on Environmental Protection as Implementation of the Unified State Environmental Policy" // Environmental law, 2010. # 6. Special edition;
- "Principles of Land Law as the Crucial Element of the Environmental Law Framework" // Environmental law of Russia. Digest of Research and Practical Conferences. Sixth issue. (2008–2009) Study guide for higher education institutions / Edited by A.K. Golichenkov. М.: Forgreifer. 2009. P.332–340;
- "Legal Issues of Land Demarcation by Categories of Intended Purpose" // Environmental Law of Russia. Digest of the Research and Practical Conference. Fifth issue. (2005–2007) Study Guide for Higher Education Institutions / Edited by A.K. Golichenkov. М.: Forgreifer. 2009. P.98–100;
- "Legal Issues of Land Demarcation by Categories in the Light of the Local Self-government Reform" // Environmental Law of Russia. Digest of the Research and Practical Conference. Fifth issue. (2005–2007) Study Guide for Higher Education Institutions / Edited by A.K. Golichenkov. М.: Forgreifer. 2009. P.256–261;
- "Legal Issues of Using Natural Resources in Sea Ports" // Environmental Law of Russia. Digest of the Research and Practical Conference. Fifth issue. (2005–2007) Study Guide for Higher Education Institutions / Edited by A.K. Golichenkov. М.: Forgreifer. 2009. P.346–349;
- "Regulating Use and Protection of the Water Reserve Land // Environmental Law of Russia. Digest of the Research and Practical Conference. Fifth issue. (2005-2007) Study Guide for Higher Education Institutions / Edited by A.K. Golichenkov. М.: Forgreifer. 2009. P.461–464;
- "On the Project of the Federal Law on Regulating Property Relations that have Arisen from Privatization of Agricultural Lands" // Environmental Law of Russia. 2007. # 1. P.12-17;
- "Commentary to the Russian Federation Water Code." "Prospect" Publishing House, 2007. – 248 p. (co-authorship with S.A. Bogolyubov and D.O. Sivakov);
- "Codification of Legislation on Environmental Protection as Implementation of the Unified State Environmental Policy" // Environmental law, 2010, # 6, special edition, p. 21–23;
- "Protection of Rights to the Declaratively Reckoned Land Plots" // Legal regulation of land development. // Materials of the international research and practice conference dedicated to the centennial of the law "On Land Development." (GUZ, October 25, 2011). – М.: GUZ, 2011 – 280 p.; p. 57–63;
- "Issues of Improving Land Legislation" // Environmental law, 2012, #1.

Gennady Volkov has been deputy chief editor of the magazine "Environmental Law" since January 1, 2010 (since 2011).

He served as the thesis supervisor of two candidates of juridical sciences: A.Y. Aleksandrov and K.V. Simonov. Professor Gennady Volkov, Doctor of Juridical Science, is mentioned in 130 sources in databases of the ConsultantPlus reference system and in 40 sources of Garant. He is a member of the First International Interactive Juridical Portal URISTI.TV.
