= Chashnikovo (Lunyovskoye rural settlement) =

Chashnikovo Чашниково
- Village (Derevnya)
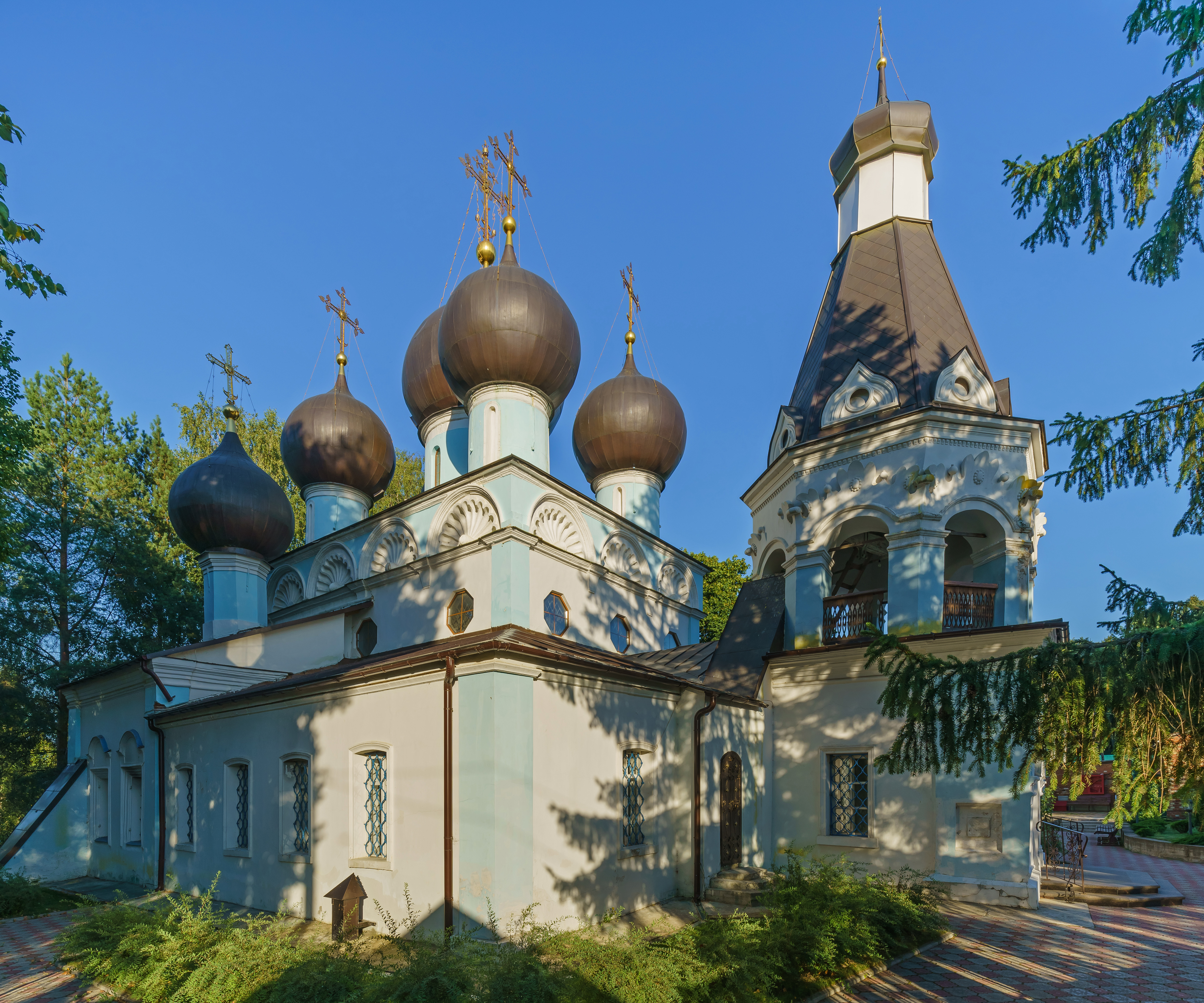
- Trinity Church in Chashnikovo, August 2018
- Interactive map of Chashnikovo
- Location of Chashnikovo Chashnikovo (Moscow Oblast)
- Coordinates: 55°59′20″N 37°24′19″E
- Country: Russia
- Federal subject: Moscow Oblast
- Administrative district: Solnechnigorsk District
- Selsoviet: Lunyovskoye Rural Settlement (until 2019)
- First mentioned: 1585

Population
  - Estimate (2010): 412 )
- Time zone: UTC+3 (MSK)
- Postal code: 141580
- OKTMO ID: 46652416191

Chashnikovo (Russian: Чашниково) is a rural locality (a village) located in the southeast of the Solnechnogorski District, in the central part of the Moscow Oblast, about 34 km southeast of the city of Solnechnogorsk, 12 km from the Moscow Ring Road, just north of Sheremetyevo Airport on the left bank of the Meshcherikha River, which flows into the Klyazma.

There are 5 streets in the village - Novaya, Promyshlennaya, Tsentralnaya, Shkolnaya and Kolesny proezd, 3 microdistricts, a garden partnership, a dacha partnership and a dacha cooperative are registered. The nearest settlements are the villages of Isakovo, Nosovo and Perepechino.

It is connected by direct bus service to Sheremetyevo Airport, as well as to the towns of Lobnya, Khimki and Dolgoprudny (routes No. 21, 41, 48 and 38). The Chashnikovo estate is an architectural monument of federal significance. It includes a house for servants, a stable, a fence, a park and an outbuilding (a parochial school).

== History ==
The village of Chashnikovo has been known since 1585. Academician Stepan Veselovsky associated the name with the Moscow merchants Chashnikovtsy.

At the beginning of the 16th century, a brick four-pillar five-domed church of the Holy Trinity was built in Chashnikovo, one of the oldest rural churches in the Moscow Oblast. The church was first documented in 1585, when Chashnikovo was owned by Nikita Romanov, grandfather of Tsar Mikhail I. In 1688 the estate had passed to Lev Naryshkin, maternal uncle of Peter the Great, who added a bell tower and had the church's decor updated to answer his own Naryshkin Baroque tastes. In 1895–1896. a separate bell tower was built according to the project of the architect A. A. Latkov. In the "List of populated places" of 1862 Chashnikovo - the owner's village of the 4th camp of the Moscow district of the Moscow province on the left side of the Rogachev tract (between the Dmitrovsky tract and the Moscow highway), 27 miles from the provincial city, by the Alba River, with 27 courtyards, Orthodox church, factory and 251 residents (105 men, 146 women). According to the data from 1890, it was part of the Ozeretsky Volost of the Moscow District, with a population of 195 people. In 1913 the village had 37 yards and a 2-class parochial school. According to the materials of the All-Union census of 1926 - the center of the Chashnikovsky Rural council of Trudovaya volost of the Moscow district, there were 281 inhabitants (133 men, 148 women), there were 66 households, among which 47 were peasants, there was a seven-year school [13]. Since 1929 the settlement was part of the Komunistichesky District of the Moskovsky District of the Moscow Region. By the decree of the Central Executive Committee and the Council of People's Commissars of July 23, 1930, the districts as administrative-territorial units were liquidated. Between 1929 and 1935 it was the administrative center of the Chashnikovsky Selsoviet of the Komunistichesky District. Between 1935 and 1939 the village was the center of the Chashnikovsky Selsoviet of the Solnechnogorsk District. Between 1939 and 1959 the village was the center of the Chashnikovsky Rural Council of the Krasnopolyansky District. Between 1959 and 1960 the village was the center of the Chashnikovsky Rural Council of the Khimki District. Between 1960 and 1963 the village was part of the Iskrovsky Rural Council of the Solnechnogorsk District. Between 1963 and 1965 the village was part of the Iskrovsky Rural Council of the Solnechnogorsk enlarged rural settlement. Between 1965 and 1994 the village was part the Iskrovsky Rural Council of the Solnechnogorsk District.

In 1994, the Moscow Regional Duma approved the regulation on local self-government in the Moscow Oblast, rural councils as administrative-territorial units were transformed into rural districts.

In the years 1994 to 2006 the village was part of the Iskrovsky rural settlement of the Solnechnogorsk District.

From 2006 to 2019 the village was part of the rural settlement Lunyovskoye of the Solnechnogorsk District
