= Bartok the Magnificent =

- DVD cover
- Directed by: Don Bluth; Gary Goldman
- Screenplay by: Jay Lacopo
- Based on: Anastasia by Susan Gauthier; Bruce Graham; Bob Tzudiker; Noni White; Eric Tuchman
- Produced by: Don Bluth; Gary Goldman
- Starring: Hank Azaria; Kelsey Grammer; Catherine O'Hara; Andrea Martin; Tim Curry; Jennifer Tilly; French Stewart; Phillip Van Dyke; Diedrich Bader
- Edited by: Bob Bender; Fiona Trayler
- Music by: Score: Stephen Flaherty; Songs: Lynn Ahrens; Stephen Flaherty
- Production companies: Fox Animation Studios; 20th Century Fox Animation
- Distributed by: 20th Century Fox Home Entertainment
- Release date: November 16, 1999
- Running time: 68 minutes
- Country: United States
- Language: English
- Budget: $24.8 million

Bartok the Magnificent is a 1999 American direct-to-video animated adventure comedy film directed by Don Bluth and Gary Goldman. It is a standalone spin-off to the 1997 film Anastasia, also directed by Bluth and Goldman, with Hank Azaria reprising his role from Anastasia as Bartok, the albino bat who acted as Rasputin's sidekick in said film. The film shows Bartok as a con artist who has the opportunity to become a true hero.

== Plot ==
Bartok the Magnificent, an albino bat magician and con artist, arrives in Moscow and makes himself known by performing for the locals. His grand finale involves defeating a savage bear. Delighted with Bartok's bravery, young tsar Ivan Romanov gifts Bartok with a royal ring, much to the chagrin of his advisor, Ludmilla. After the show, Bartok counts his earnings and is startled by the bear, revealed to be his business partner Zozi, who tells Bartok that he should return the ring because it is for royalty, but Bartok refuses because it was a gift.

When Ivan is apparently captured by the witch Baba Yaga, there is an immediate investigation. In seeking a rescuer, two children nominate Bartok, who, with Zozi, is on his way to St. Petersburg when spotted by Cossacks. Bartok is brought before the townspeople, who are relying on his courage to save Ivan. Reluctantly, Bartok accepts after a sweet little girl begs him and he cannot bring himself to say he is not a real hero. Despite Zozi's objection Bartok and Zozi set out for the Iron Forest. Upon arriving at Baba Yaga's hut, the duo must answer a riddle given by the entrance, a giant talking skull. With the riddle solved, Bartok is then captured by Baba Yaga, who explains that, to save Ivan, Bartok must retrieve three artifacts from the forest, without any assistance: her pet pink snake Piloff, Oble's crown, and the Magic Feather. However, Bartok quickly finds that these tasks are difficult, as Piloff is frozen to a metal boulder; Oble, a fiery ogre blacksmith, must be tricked into letting his crown be stolen; and the Magic Feather must be obtained without flight, utilizing only the previous two items, with Piloff removed from the boulder when Bartok brought them to the Skull. Meanwhile, back at Moscow, Ludmilla takes Ivan's throne.

After Bartok returns to Baba Yaga, she reveals that she needs something from Bartok himself. Baba Yaga rejects all his offers and, outraged, Bartok lashes out at her, accusing her of lying and cheating. Suddenly stricken with guilt, Bartok apologizes and cries, allowing Baba Yaga to obtain the most important ingredient: a tear of compassion from the heart. She conjures up a potion from Piloff's essence, energy from one of the crown's jewels, the magic feather's magic, and Bartok's tear. Baba Yaga reveals that she never kidnapped Ivan, as she has Bartok see Moscow's castle, implying that Ivan is imprisoned there. Baba Yaga also reveals that the potion was intended for Bartok himself, making whatever he is in his heart ten times on the outside. Bartok and Zozi return to town. Bartok explains his adventure to Ludmilla and people in the throne room. He then leads Ludmilla and Vol, the Captain of the Guard, up to the top of the tower, where Ivan is imprisoned.

Ludmilla imprisons Bartok and angrily scolds at Vol about Ivan being imprisoned, revealing that she had Vol impersonate Baba Yaga and kidnap the prince while she framed the real Baba Yaga as part of her plan to steal the throne. Ludmilla wanted Vol to kill Ivan after kidnapping him, but Vol mistakenly imprisoned him. Ludmilla imprisons Vol as punishment for his confusion, steals Bartok's potion, and leaves her prisoners in a flooded tower. Ludmilla drinks Bartok's potion, thinking that it will make her a more powerful leader. However, instead, it turns her into a giant dragon, causing her to attack Moscow.

Zozi comes and rescues Bartok, Ivan, and Vol. Bartok battles Ludmilla, and he uses his skills from his tasks in the Iron Forest to trick her into climbing the tower. When Ludmilla reaches the top, her increased weight causes it to collapse, crushing her and unleashing a wave that douses the flames caused by her newfound fiery breath. As the townsfolk gather around the wreckage, Zozi discovers that Baba Yaga is not wicked, and hails Bartok as a true hero. Ivan and the people praise Bartok for his heroism. Bartok returns Ivan's ring and thanks Baba Yaga for his skills. The three hug before Bartok bids farewell to them, and he counts on seeing them again someday.

== Voice cast ==
- Hank Azaria as Bartok, a talking albino bat magician and con-artist. He has a dry sense of humor and a heart of gold. Bartok is tasked to find and rescue Prince Ivan from Baba Yaga only to discover that not all is what it seems.
- Catherine O'Hara as Ludmilla, Prince Ivan's royal advisor. Vain, devious, snobby and ferociously ambitious.
- Kelsey Grammer as Zozi, a talking Shakespeare-loving bear and Bartok's business partner. He serves as the voice of reason to Bartok. Grammer had previously voiced Vladimir in Anastasia.
- Andrea Martin as Baba Yaga, a witch who is framed for kidnapping Ivan. Surly and unfriendly, Baba Yaga turns out to be lonely but well-meaning who becomes Bartok's benefactor in helping him defeat Ludmilla. Martin had previously voiced Phlegmenkoff in Anastasia.
- Jennifer Tilly as Piloff, Baba Yaga's pink snake-like happy-go-lucky and chipper pet.
- Diedrich Bader as Vol, Prince Ivan's loyal but naïve royal guard.
- French Stewart as Oble, a fire ogre blacksmith.
- Phillip Van Dyke as Ivan Romanov, the young good-hearted Prince of Russia. He loves Bartok's performances, seeing them as entertaining.
- Tim Curry as The Skull, a large grim skull of a monster that guards Baba Yaga's gates. He challenges people with riddles in order for them to get to Baba Yaga's house.
- Glenn Shadix as Townspeople Ensemble
- Danny Mann as Head Cossack
- Zachary B. Charles as Little Boy
- Kelly Marie Berger as Little Girl

At one point, a man who resembles Grigori Rasputin, the main antagonist of Anastasia, tries to touch the potion that Baba Yaga prepared for Bartok.

== Production ==
The film was devised as "Hollywood audiences went batty over the impish Bartok in Fox's 1997 animated musical Anastasia". Chris Meledandri, then-president of 20th Century Fox Animation, said: "Once we thought about a lot of ideas, our favorite idea was the one you see".

== Music ==
The film's songs were written by Stephen Flaherty and Lynn Ahrens, both returning from Anastasia.

=== Songs ===
No.	Title	Performer(s)	Length
1.	"Baba Yaga"	Chorus
2.	"Bartok the Magnificent"	Hank Azaria & Chorus
3.	"A Possible Hero"	Kelsey Grammer & Hank Azaria	1:37
4.	"Someone's in My House"	Andrea Martin & Chorus	1:52
5.	"The Real Ludmilla"	Catherine O'Hara & Chorus	2:24

== Release ==
=== Marketing ===
In late 1999, pancake purveyor IHOP started selling two versions of Bartok, as part of promotion. The company planned "to sell about 500,000 of the six-inch-high toys - Bartok Puppet and Turban Bartok - for $2.99 with any food purchase". It was "also offering $2 mail-in rebate coupons for the $20 video...and free activity books for children".

=== Home media ===
Bartok the Magnificent was first released on VHS and DVD by 20th Century Fox Home Entertainment on November 16, 1999, and was later re-released in 2005 as part of a 2-disc set alongside Anastasia entitled Family Fun Edition. Bartok the Magnificent was also included as a special feature on the Anastasia Blu-ray, released in March 2011.

The tape and DVD conclude with sing-along segments that reprise the original tunes by Stephen Flaherty and Lynn Ahrens - "Bartok the Magnificent", "A Possible Hero", "Someone's in My House" and "Once Upon a December" (from Anastasia). Other DVD extras also include Bartok and Anastasia trailers, and a Maze Game that features three mazes.

==== Visual and audio ====
The aspect ratio is 1.33:1 – Full Frame. The DVD release has the original aspect ratio, and it is not anamorphic. As the source is video and not film, and because there is no widescreen aspect ratio available, the quality is at the same level of the original film. Digitally Obsessed says: "The colors are nicely rendered, with a minimum of bleeding" but when viewed on "a 115 foot projection screen through a progressive scan player...the image was fairly grainy and uneven". The film has English and French audio. Digitally Obsessed says: "The DS2.0 mix is more than adequate for this fun little bat romp [though there is a] lack of directionality in the mix. The dialogue is clear and center speaker weighted". It concluded by saying that "this is a great DVD for kids, because besides just watching the movie they can enjoy the three sing-alongs or try to find Prince Ivan in the mazes. Bartok teaches moral values in a way that kids can understand". According to LoveFilm, the film has been dubbed into English, German, French, Spanish, Italian, Swedish, and Dutch. It has subtitles in Dutch, French, German, Italian, Spanish, and Swedish. Fort Worth Star-Telegram implied this was one of the rare direct-to-video films that is great quality, saying "the made-for-tape bin can yield an undiscovered bargain [such as] Bartok the Magnificent". Lexington Herald-Leader said "to my surprise...the movie overall [is] quite good".

=== Critical response ===
Dan Jardine of Apollo Guide gave the film a score of 71 out of 100. Michael Dequina of The Movie Report wrote a review in which he scored it 1.5 out of 4, writing the film as uninspired and short fun adventure for kids, but boring for everyone else. Family Video said that "the film is marked by imaginative scenery, catchy songs, comic characters and Bartok's own funny and neurotic commentary". Hartford Courant described the film as "enjoyable". Indianapolis Star said "'Bartok' is quite good for video-only release". Digitally Obsessed gave the film a Style grade of B+, Substance rating of A, Image Transfer rating of C, Audio Transfer rating of B, and Extras rating of B+ - averaging out to a B+ rating of the film as a whole. It said "Stephen Flaherty's score is very nice". On Love Film, the film has a rating of three of five stars based on 222 member ratings.

Joe Leydon of Variety explained: "Tykes will likely be charmed by the brisk pacing, vibrant (albeit stereotypical) characters and engaging storyline, while parents may be especially grateful for a cartoon with much better production values than Pokémon". He noted that "even very small children will notice early on that Ludmilla...a duplicitous regent, is the real villain of the piece". He said co-directors Bluth and Goldman "do a respectable job of establishing what promises to be a new direct-to-video franchise", also adding that "though certainly not as lavish as its bigscreen predecessor Anastasia, the sequel is attractive and involving, with Tim Curry and Jennifer Tilly well cast as supporting-character voices". He said Azaria has "amusing brio", while Grammer "is the real scene-stealer this time". He described the songs as "pleasant but unremarkable". Fort Oglethorpe Press described the film as "spectacular", "frolicking" and "fun-filled", adding that it is "loaded with breathtaking, feature-quality animation", and "spectacular music", and "enchanting new songs".

The Trades questioned its existence, saying: "I am unsure what reason this spin-off was made, but regardless, it was a well done one". It added that "the same team directed and produced the second movie, and unlike many direct to video movies, it is animated as well as the first and uses a healthy portion of CGI, something many movies of that nature tend to lack. Backgrounds have the same detail as the original movie, making this a definite worthwhile watch". The Dallas Morning News notes "Bartok the Magnificent does even more disservice to Russian history than Anastasia did".

=== Accolades ===
Bartok the Magnificent was nominated for "Outstanding Achievement in an Animated Home Video Production" at the 28th Annie Awards in 2000, losing to Disney's An Extremely Goofy Movie. It also received Gold Reel Award nominations for "Best Sound Editing" for both television films and direct-to-video presentations from the Motion Picture Sound Editors that same year, beaten by Shake, Rattle and Roll: An American Love Story and Alvin and the Chipmunks Meet Frankenstein, respectively.

Award	Nomination	Nominee	Result
Annie Award	Outstanding Animated Home Video Production	Bartok the Magnificent	Nominated
Golden Reel Award	Best Sound Editing - Television Movies and Specials - Music	Paul Silver, Mark Server (music editors)	Nominated
Golden Reel Award	Best Sound Editing - Direct to Video - Sound Editorial	Mark Server, Scott Seymann, Michael Ferdie, Tom Wheeler, Fiona Trayler, Robert Bender, Jeff Snodgrass (editors)	Nominated
