= Sheremetyevo International Airport =

International airport serving Moscow, Russia

Alexander S. Pushkin Sheremetyevo International Airport Международный аэропорт Шереметьево имени А. С. Пушкина

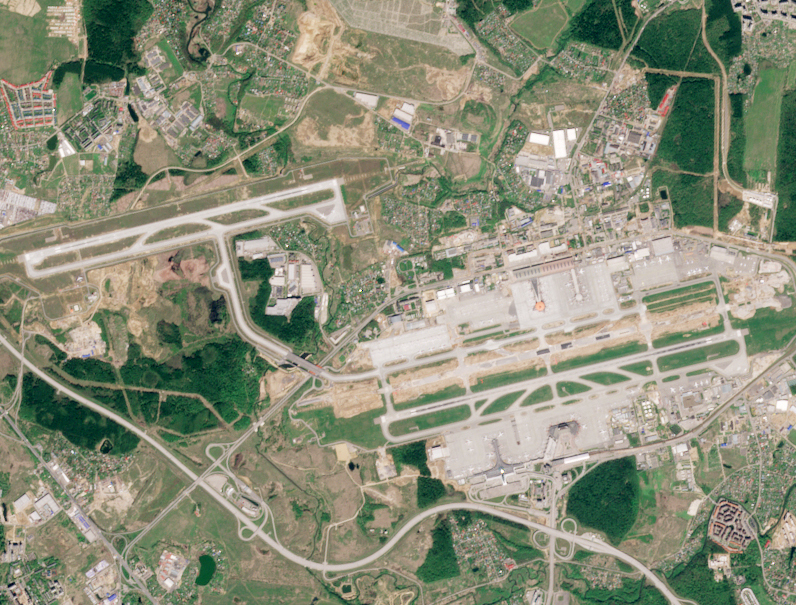
- Satellite view of the airport in May 2020
- IATA: SVO; ICAO: UUEE; LID: ШРМ

Summary
- Airport type: Public
- Owner/Operator: International Airport Sheremetyevo
- Serves: Moscow metropolitan area
- Location: Khimki, Moscow Oblast
- Opened: 11 August 1959 (67 years ago)
- Hub for: Aeroflot; Nordwind Airlines; Pobeda; Rossiya Airlines; Smartavia
- Elevation AMSL: 192 m (630 ft)
- Coordinates: 55°58′22″N 37°24′53″E
- Website: svo.aero

Map
- Location of the airport in Moscow Oblast Location of the airport in Russia Location of the airport in Europe

Runways
Direction	Length		Surface
Direction	m	ft	Surface
06R/24L	3,700	12,139	Concrete
06C/24C	3,550	11,647	Concrete
06L/24R	3,200	10,499	Concrete

Statistics (2025)
- Passengers: ▼43,500,000
- Aircraft movements: ▲230,400
- Sources: Sheremetyevo Airport

Alexander S. Pushkin Sheremetyevo International Airport (Note: Russian: Международный аэропорт Шереметьево имени А. С. Пушкина, IPA: [ʂɨrʲɪˈmʲetʲjɪvə]) (Internal code: ШРМ, IATA: SVO, ICAO: UUEE), more commonly known as Sheremetyevo International Airport or simply Sheremetyevo is the busiest of the four international airports that serve the city of Moscow. It is the busiest airport in Russia and the post-Soviet states, as well as the ninth-busiest airport in Europe. Originally built as a military airbase, Sheremetyevo was converted into a civilian airport in 1959. The airport was originally named after a nearby village, and a 2019 contest extended the name to include the name of the Russian poet Alexander Pushkin.

The airport comprises six terminals: four international terminals (one under construction), one domestic terminal, and one private aviation terminal. It is located 29 km (18 mi) northwest of central Moscow, between the towns of Lobnya and Khimki in Moscow Oblast.

In 2019, the airport handled about 49.9 million passengers. Sheremetyevo serves as the main hub for Russian flag carrier Aeroflot as well as its subsidiaries Rossiya Airlines and Pobeda, for Nordwind Airlines and its subsidiary Ikar, and for Smartavia.

== History ==
=== Soviet era ===
The airport was built as a military airfield called Sheremetyevsky (Шереметьевский), named after a village of the same name, as well as the nearby railway station of the same name. The decree for the construction of the Central Airdrome of the Air Force near the settlement of Chashnikovo on the outskirts of Moscow was issued on 1 September 1953 by the Council of Ministers of the Soviet Union. The airport became operational on 7 November 1957 to celebrate the 40th anniversary of the October Revolution.

In August 1959, the Council of Ministers made a decree to terminate the airbase's use for military purposes, where it would be handed over to the Principal Directorate of the Civil Air Fleet to be converted into a civilian airport. Sheremetyevo's civilian purposes started on 11 August 1959 when a Tupolev Tu-104B landed at the airport from Leningrad

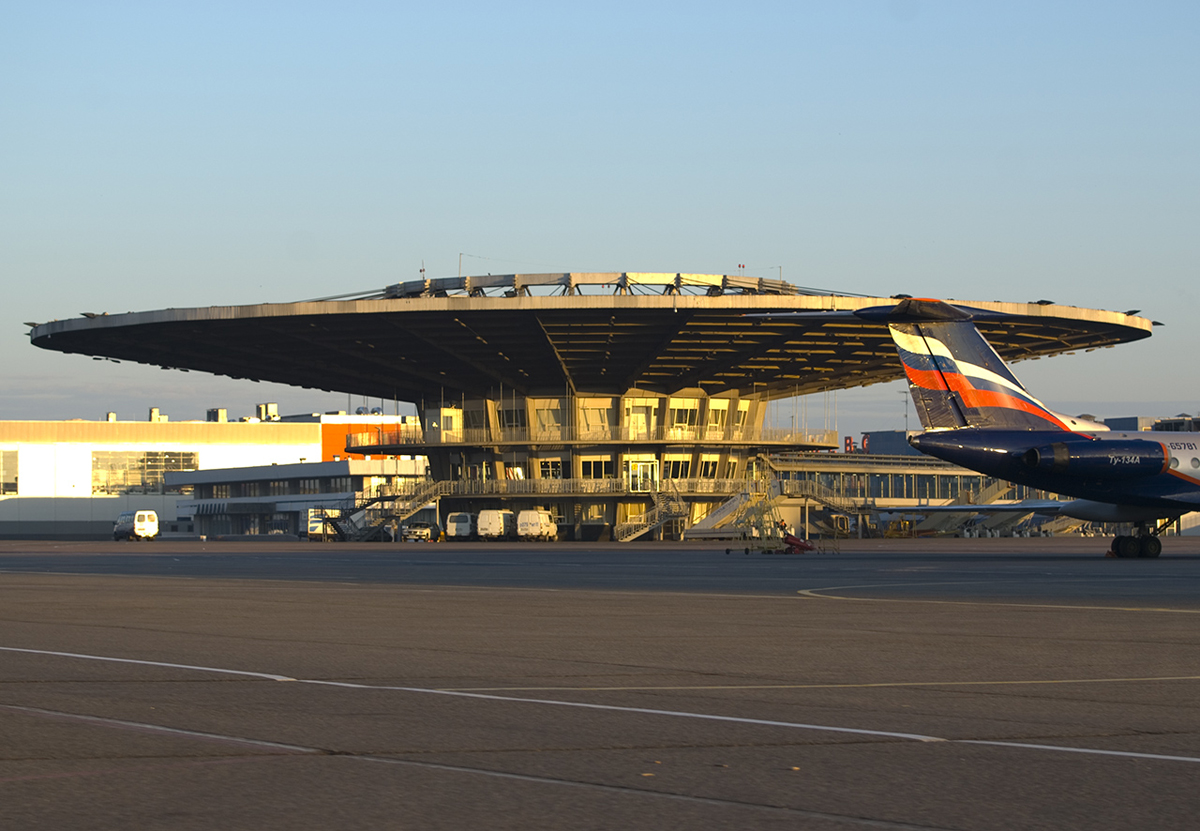
"Flying saucer" of the former Sheremetyevo-1 (initial Terminal B)

The first international flight took place on 1 June 1960 to Berlin Schönefeld Airport using an Ilyushin Il-18. Sheremetyevo was officially opened on the day after, where a two-story terminal occupying 1,820 square metres (19,600 sq ft) was commissioned. On 3 September 1964, the Sheremetyevo-1 terminal was opened. Of that year, 18 foreign airlines had regular flights to Sheremetyevo, with up to 10 different types of aircraft involved. By the end of 1964, Sheremetyevo handled 822,000 passengers and 23,000 tons of mail and cargo, including 245,000 passengers and 12,000 tons of cargo that were transported internationally. Soon, by the end of 1965, a majority of international flights to the USSR was achieved through Sheremetyevo thanks to Aeroflot's air traffic agreements with 47 countries.

In the early 1970s, a second runway was constructed at Sheremetyevo, with the first airliner to land being an Ilyushin Il-62. In preparation for the 1980 Summer Olympics, construction of a second terminal for Sheremetyevo, Sheremetyevo-2, was approved by the Ministry of Civil Aviation in early 1976. Construction of Sheremetyevo-2 started on 17 November 1977.

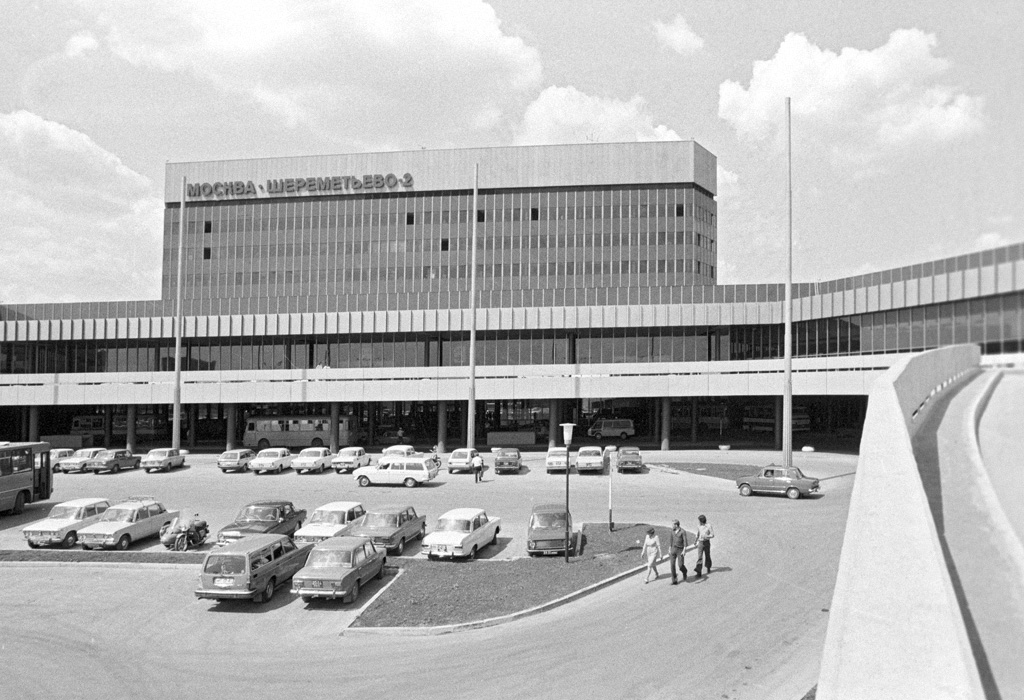
Sheremetyevo-2 (now known as Terminal F) was built for the 1980 Moscow Olympics.

On 1 January 1980, Sheremetyevo-2 was put into operation, with a capacity to serve an annual 6 million passengers, or 2,100 passengers per hour. Despite this, its official opening ceremony was held much later, on 6 May 1980. During the Olympics, Sheremetyevo served more than 460,000 international passengers.

Irish author Dervla Murphy described arriving into and overnighting at the airport in 1983 as part of a trip to Madagascar as Aeroflot were the cheapest carrier:

We landed at Moscow in brilliant sunshine. Beside the runway, peasant women wearing headscarves were languidly raking hay in golden meadows; if there is a production target for haycocks it was not bothering them. Ninety minutes and several long queues later we were in the nearby Airport Hotel, a gaunt glass and concrete block which for transit passengers like us, staying overnight without visas, is literally a prison. All its doors were guarded twenty-four hours a day by armed men, impassive but alert in smart green uniforms. Others of that ilk supervise one's fifty-yard walk from the bus to the hotel entrance, and back again when departure time comes. Any passenger who steps out of line provokes a yell and a scowl from the nearest guard. The general effect is of a neurotic mistrust holding the Soviet psyche by the throat.

=== Contemporary era ===
On 11 November 1991, Sheremetyevo International Airport received its legal status as a state-owned enterprise, amidst the dissolution of the Soviet Union. On 9 July 1996, Sheremetyevo became an open joint-stock company. In 1997, the airport renovated one of its runways with a 30–35 cm (12–14 in) thick concrete surface.

In the early 2000s, Sheremetyevo saw growing competition from the rapidly expanding Moscow Domodedovo Airport, which was more modern and convenient to access, and the neighbouring Vnukovo Airport. Sheremetyevo saw 24 of its airlines, notably domestic airlines such as Sibir, KrasAir, Transaero, Pulkovo Airlines, and UTAir, as well as international airlines Air Malta, Adria Airlines, Swiss, British Airways, and Emirates, move their services to Domodedovo. As a result, Aeroflot pushed for a third terminal for the airport, Sheremetyevo-3, to increase the airport's passenger capacity as well as be able to fulfill its requirements to join Skyteam.

In the late 2000s, Sheremetyevo oversaw rapid planning and expansion of the airport. On 12 March 2007, the airport opened Terminal C to maximise the airport's international passenger capacity. On 5 March 2008, the airport renovated its second runway to receive all types of aircraft, including the Airbus A380 and the Boeing 787 Dreamliner. An Aeroexpress line was constructed between Sheremetyevo and Savyolovsky Railway Station on 10 June 2008, reducing traveling time from the airport to central Moscow to 30 minutes. In January 2009, Sheremetyevo finalised a master plan where it would increase passenger capacity to an annual 64 million per year and build a second airfield with a third runway. On 15 November 2009, construction of Terminal D was completed, with a total surface area of 172,000 square metres (1,850,000 sq ft), an annual capacity of 12 million passengers, and operation being putting forth in the beginning of next year. Sheremetyevo-2 was renamed Terminal F on 25 December 2009 with terminal identification using international (Latin) lettering.

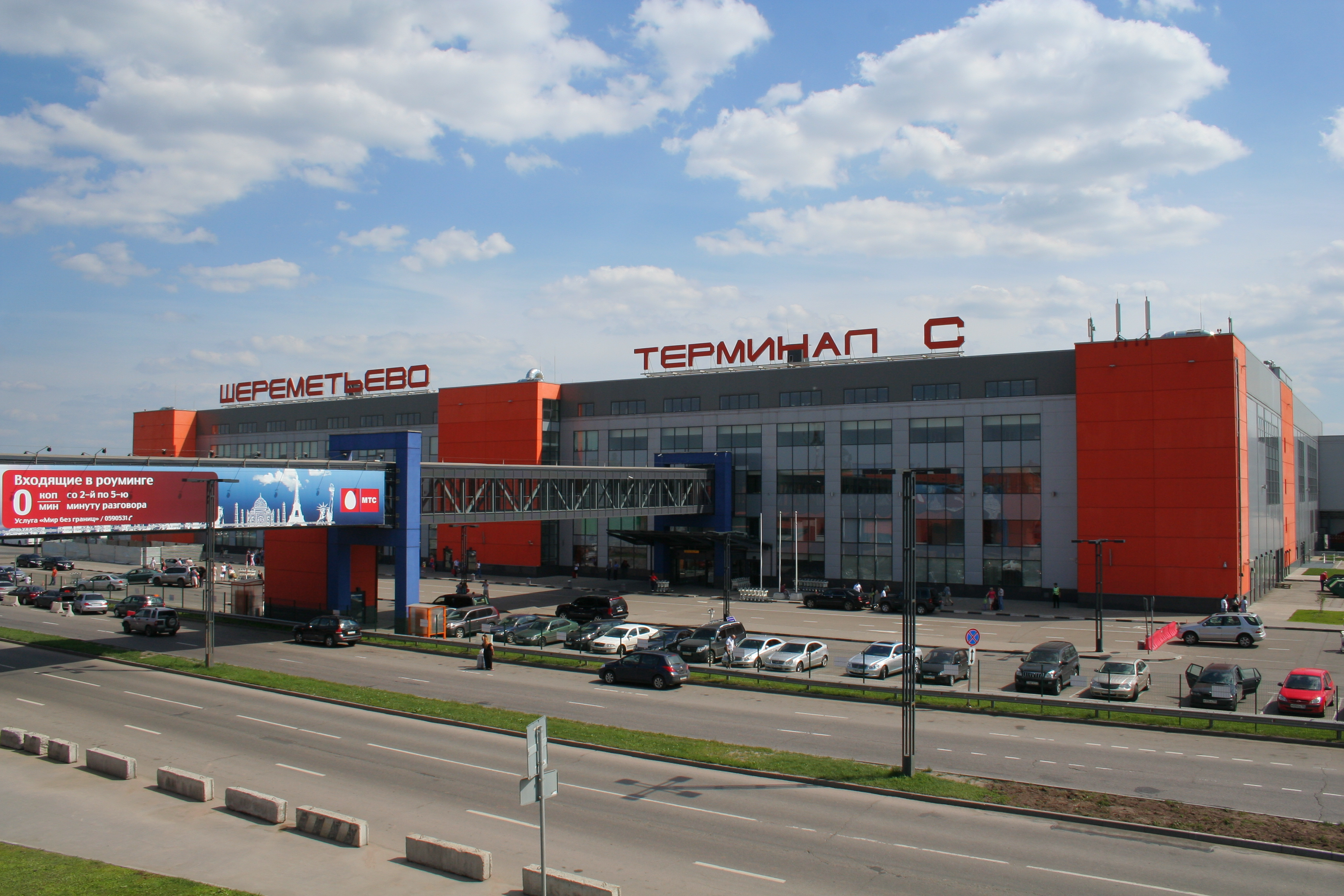
The former building of Terminal C, now demolished for a larger reconstruction of the terminal

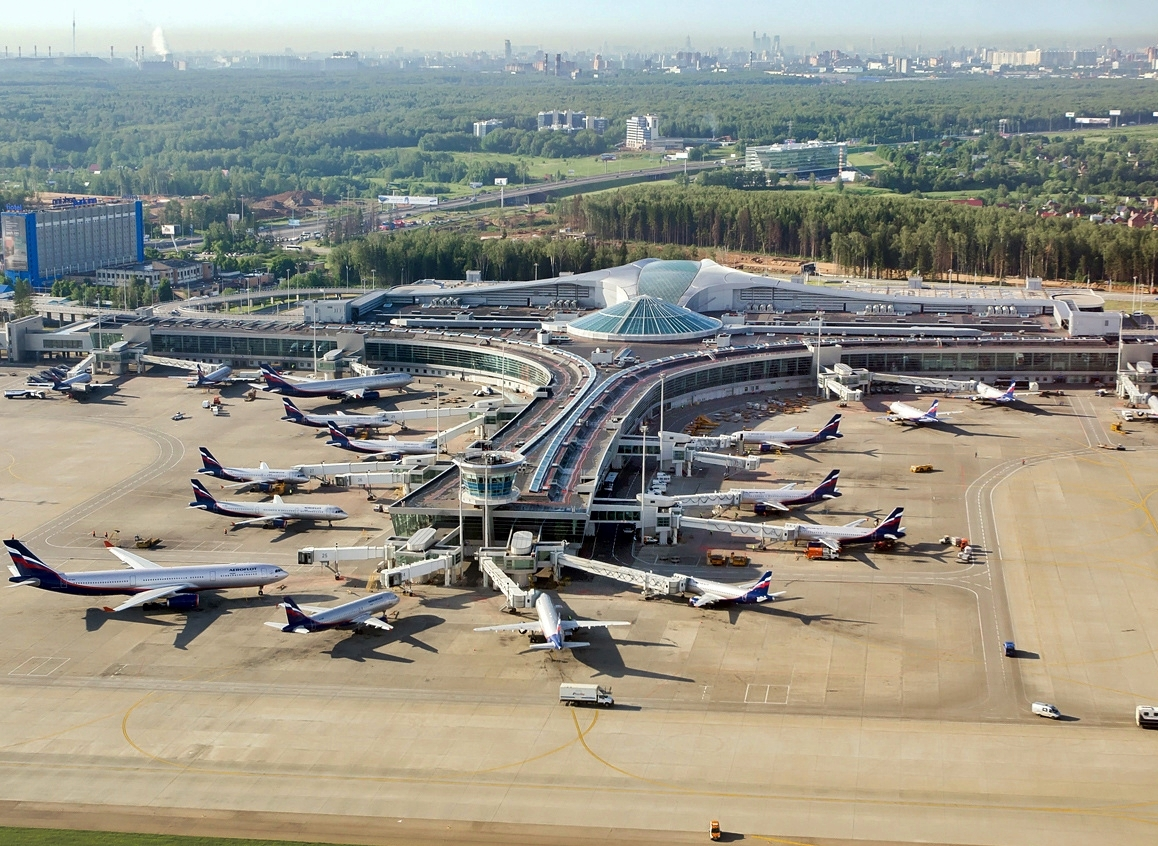
Terminal D

Expansion of Sheremetyevo continued into 2010. Sheremetyevo-1 was renamed Terminal B on 28 March. Terminal E was opened on 30 April, connecting Terminal D and Terminal F and increasing the airport's capacity to 35 million passengers per year. In June, construction started for Terminal A, a private aviation terminal. In July, a walkway opened between Terminals D, E, F, and the Aeroexpress railway terminal on the public access side. In November, a walkway opened between Terminals D, E, and F on the security side. Both of have simplified transfer between transit flights. Ultimately, after the northern the recent construction work, the airport now has the capacity to receive more than 40 million passengers annually.

On 28 March 2011, a separate airfield that would serve as Sheremetyevo's third runway was approved. On 13 December 2011, the Federal Agency for State Property Management approved an agreement that merged the airport operators OAO Terminal (operator of Terminal D) and OJSC Sheremetyevo, consolidating control of the airport under one entity. On 26 December 2011, a new area control centre (ACC) was opened for Sheremetyevo, consolidating operations of the airport's different control centres to increase efficiency. The situational centre was also created as part of the ACC for joint work of top-managers, heads of state bodies, and partners of Sheremetyevo to resolve emergencies.

=== Continued expansion ===
On 30 December 2013, TPS Avia successfully won a competitive tender to develop Sheremetyevo International Airport's northern area, including a new passenger terminal, a new freight terminal, a refuelling area and a tunnel linking the passenger terminal to three other terminals.

Terminal B, previously Sheremetyevo-1, was demolished in August 2015 to be reconstructed as a newer and more modern terminal, which began in October 2015. By the end of 2015, Sheremetyevo surpassed its competitor Domodedovo as Russia's busiest airport, serving 31.28 million passengers, compared to Domodedovo's 30.05 million. This trend continued in 2016, where Sheremetyevo saw growth while Vnukovo and Domodedovo showed losses in passengers. A growing number of airlines launched new operations to Sheremetyevo, such as Tianjin Airlines, Tunisair, Nouvelair, and Air Malta, which back in the 2000s moved its operation to Domodedovo.

In February 2016, TPS Avia combined its assets with Sheremetyevo Airport and committed to invest US$840 million to upgrade and expand the airport's infrastructure – as a result TPS Avia secured a 68% stake in Sheremetyevo Airport. Part of the plan includes demolishing Terminal C for a newer reconstruction of the terminal, which came to effect on 1 April 2017.

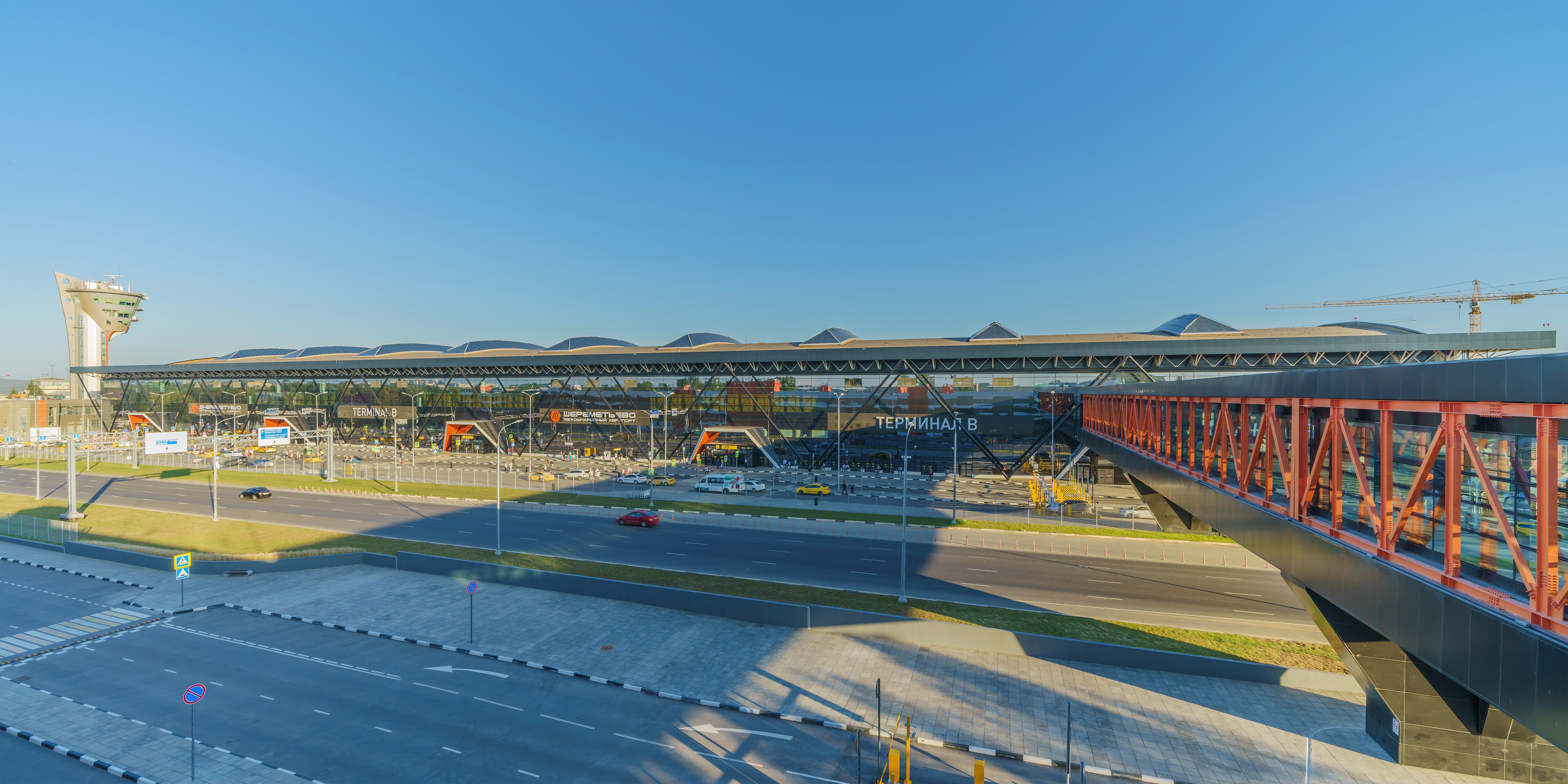
Terminal B

Sheremetyevo International Airport was the official airport of the 2018 FIFA World Cup. Sheremetyevo completed re-construction of its first northern terminal, Terminal B, in May 2018, to handle more passengers for the tournament. In 2018, the Airport reported revenues of €194.9 million, a 6% increase year over year. Profit increased 7.4% year over year. These increases are attributed in part to increased air traffic due to the 2018 FIFA World Cup.

In late 2018, SVO enacted a series of changes to its flight traffic. Aeroflot subsidiary Rossiya Airlines announced the transfer of its flights from Vnukovo to Sheremetyevo starting 28 October 2018. British Airways also launched direct flights from London Heathrow to Sheremetyevo on the same day. Syria-based Cham Wings Airlines began direct flights from Damascus to SVO in November 2018 as well. In December 2018, following the results of the Great Names of Russia contest, Sheremetyevo was named after the great Russian poet Alexander Pushkin. The ceremony took place on 5 June 2019, which was the 220th anniversary of Pushkin's birth year. The airport is now officially named Sheremetyevo Alexander S. Pushkin International Airport.

In 2019, the Russian Federal Security Service (FSB) began testing an automated passport control system at SVO. This system relies on biometric data and foreign passport recognition to allow Russian passengers to move through border control with fewer movement restrictions. If successful, the FSB may implement this system in other Russian airports.

In 2019 Airport started developing and implementation of a digital twin model aimed to forecast and plan all the airport operations. Even being launched on pilot level it already resulted in more than 1 billion rubles saving (more than US$120 million) and made the airport the world leader in On-Time Performance despite complex climate issues.

== Jet fuel fraud ==
Organized Crime and Corruption Reporting Project (OCCRP) reports that the airport has been used for laundering money. It purchased jet fuel from a broad network of middlemen between 2003 and 2008, which greatly increased the price. Court records show that just in 2006 and 2007, phantom corporations made at least $200 million in pointless markups. The scam cost the Russian government approximately 1 billion rubles ($40 million) in missing tax income. The cost of jet fuel increased, which also increased the cost of airline tickets for the general population.

== Terminals ==
Sheremetyevo International Airport has four operating passenger terminals and one special terminal reserved for the use of private and business aviation. The airport's four passenger terminals are divided into two groups based on geographical location: the Northern Terminal Complex and the Southern Terminal Complex. The current terminal naming system was introduced in December 2009; previously, the terminals were numbered: Sheremetyevo-1 (now Terminal B), Sheremetyevo-2 (now Terminal F), and Sheremetevo-3 (now Terminal D).

=== Terminal A ===
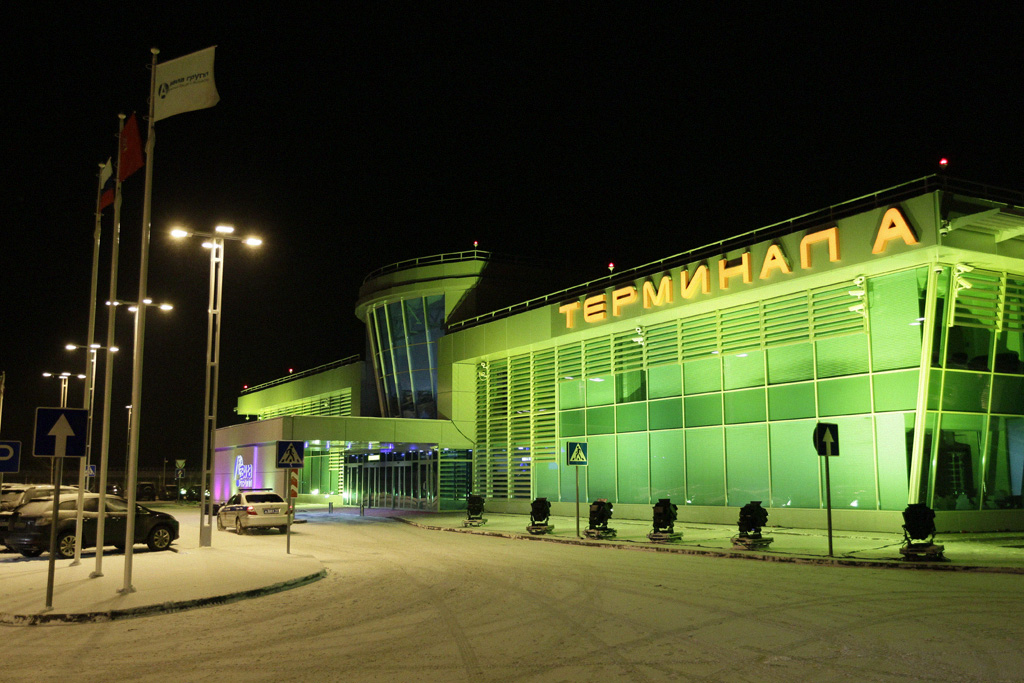
Terminal A

Opened on 16 January 2012, Terminal A handles servicing of business and private aviation out of Sheremetyevo.

=== Northern terminals ===
==== Terminal B ====
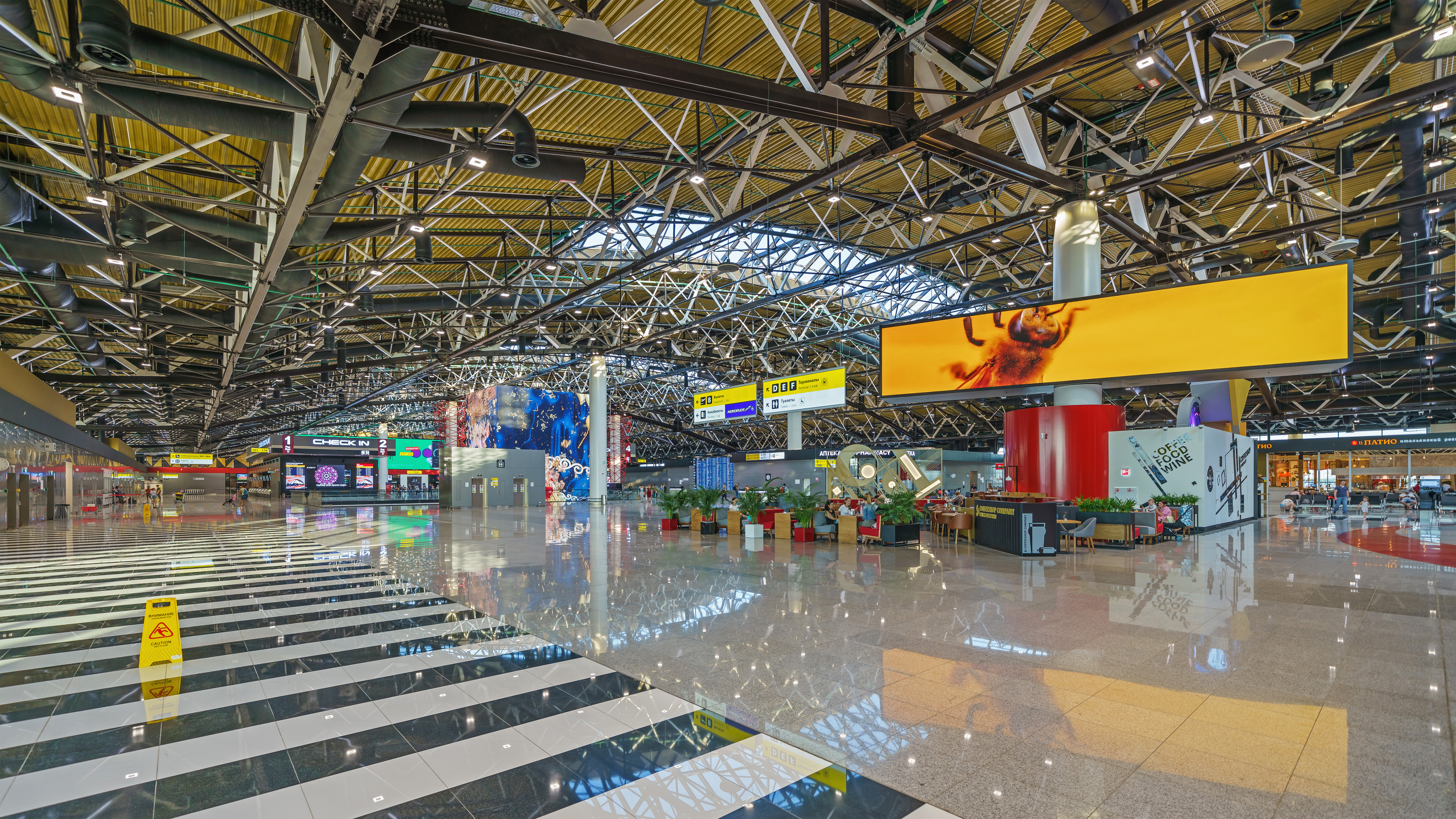
Lobby of Terminal B in its current form

Terminal B – originally named Sheremetyevo-1 – has two iterations.

The first iteration was constructed and opened on 3 September 1964. The terminal, as Sheremetyevo-1, was known for its "flying-saucer"-like design, and was nicknamed "shot glass" by locals. Being 200 metres (660 ft) long and 40 metres (130 ft) wide, as well as having a volume exceeding 100,000 cubic metres (3,500,000 ft^{3}), the terminal can hold up to 800 people per hour. Formerly serving international flights, Sheremetyevo-1 would transition to serving domestic flights. Along with other Sheremetyevo terminals that underwent Latin lettering conventions, Sheremetyevo-1 was renamed Terminal B on 28 March 2010. Terminal B was then demolished in August 2015 to be reconstructed as a larger and more modern terminal which began in October 2015.

The new terminal B commenced its operations on 3 May 2018, with the Aeroflot's flight to Saratov. All airlines that have domestic flights from Sheremetyevo and some flights of Aeroflot began shifting to Terminal B from Terminal D. Compared to the previous terminal B, that was demolished, new terminal will have an increased passenger capacity of 20 million passengers and will serve domestic flights only. As of November 2018, Aeroflot has consolidated all of its domestic services at Terminal B, with the exception of flights to far eastern destinations in Vladivostok, Khabarovsk and Petropavlovsk-Kamchatsky. Flights to the eastern Russian shore and some short-haul (including all domestic flights served by widebodies) continue out of SVO's Terminal D.

The terminal is connected by an interterminal underground passage with Sheremetyevo's southern terminals and the Aeroexpress railway station.

==== Terminal C ====
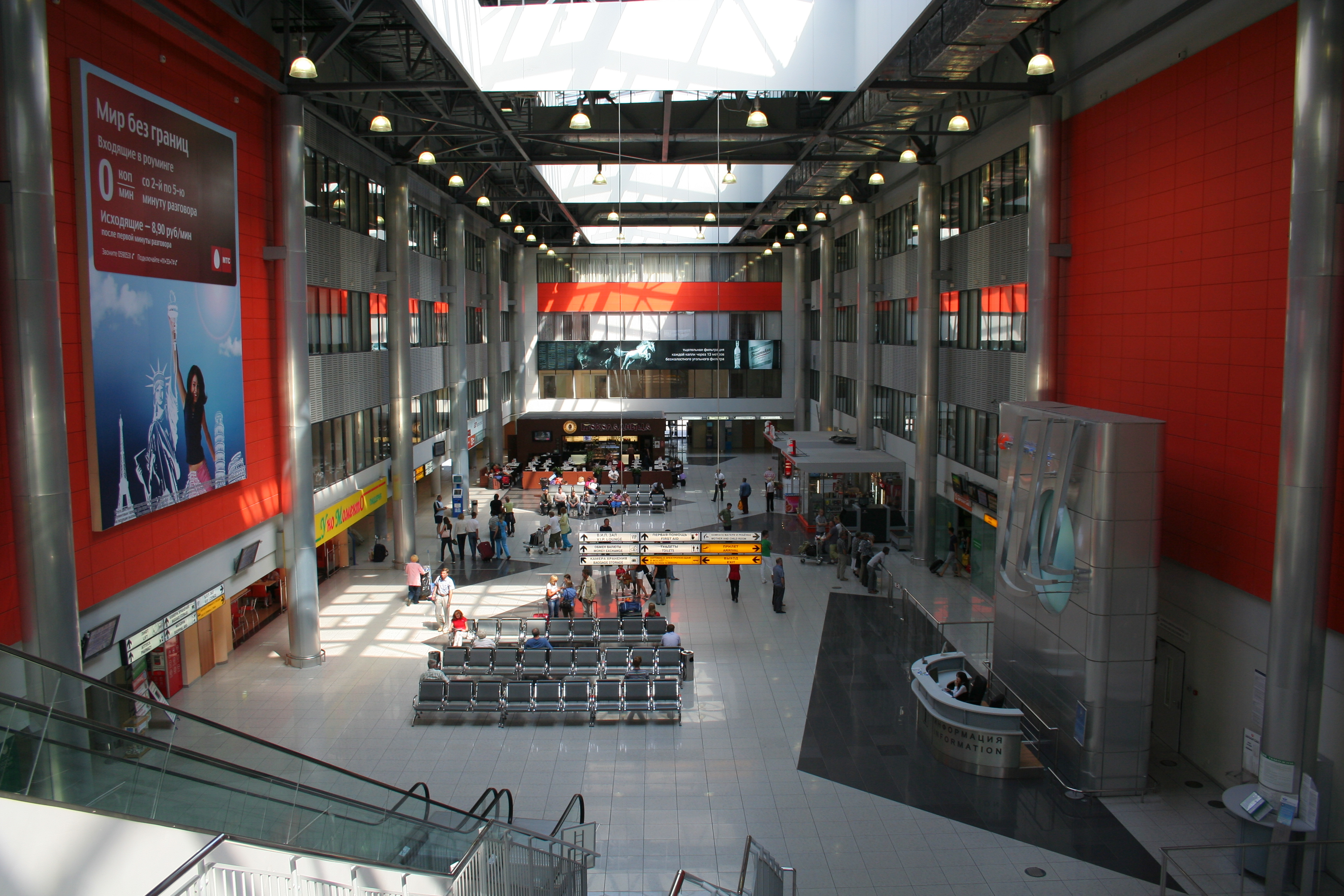
Interior of the former (now-demolished) Terminal C

On 12 March 2007, Sheremetyevo opened the former Terminal C for the servicing of international charter flights to maximize location convenience for all areas in the airport. Located adjacent to the former Terminal B, Terminal C served from 5 to 6 million passengers. The role of Terminal C diminished as passengers for international flights for the airport were distributed among Terminal D and Terminal E.

Integrated with the now-reconstructed domestic Terminal B, the new Terminal C was designed to serve up to 20 million passengers.

The first section of the new Terminal C opened on 17 January 2020, with a planned capacity of 20 million passengers. It is called Terminal C1, and some international flights were transferred to that new terminal. Another part called Terminal C2 is scheduled to be opened in 2026, and will add another 10 million passengers capacity.

=== Southern terminals ===
==== Terminal D ====
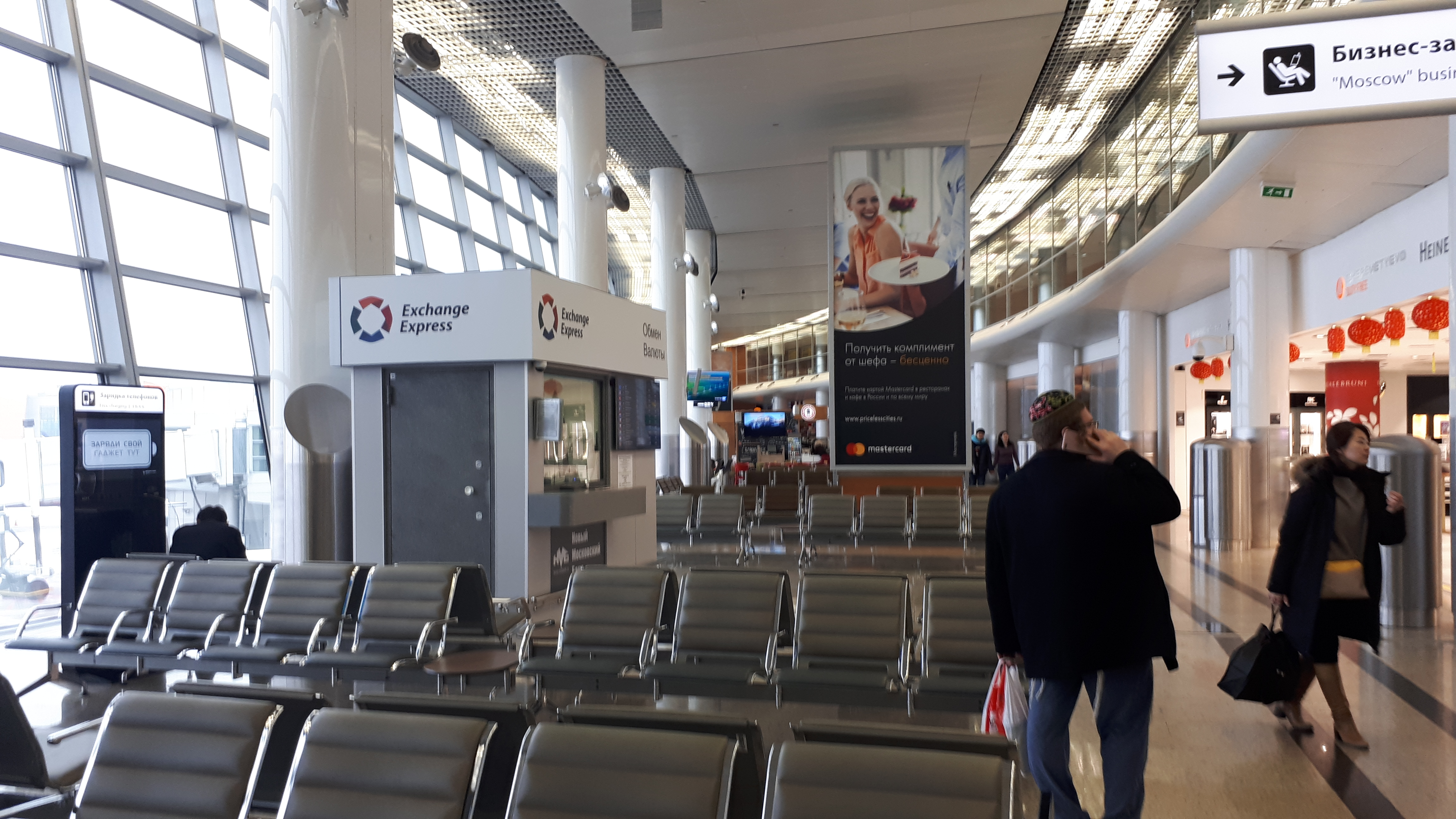
Gates of Terminal D

Terminal D, opened in November 2009, is adjacent to Terminal F. The 172,000 m^{2} (1,850,000 sq ft) building is a hub for Aeroflot and its SkyTeam partners, with capacity for 12 million passengers per year. Aeroflot had been trying to implement the project of a new terminal (Sheremetyevo-3) since January 2001. However, construction only began in 2005, with commissioning of the complex finally taking place on 15 November 2009. The acquisition of its own terminal was a condition of Aeroflot's entry into the SkyTeam airline alliance, thus necessitating the construction. The main contractor for the build was a Turkish company Enka. Terminal D has 22 jetways and 11 remote stands. On 15 November 2009 at 9:15 a.m., the first flight from Terminal D (the new official name of Sheremetyevo-3) departed for the southern resort city of Sochi. Despite this, Aeroflot took a number of months (due to unexpected administrative delays) to transfer all of its international flights from Terminal F to D (a full transfer was originally planned for February 2010).

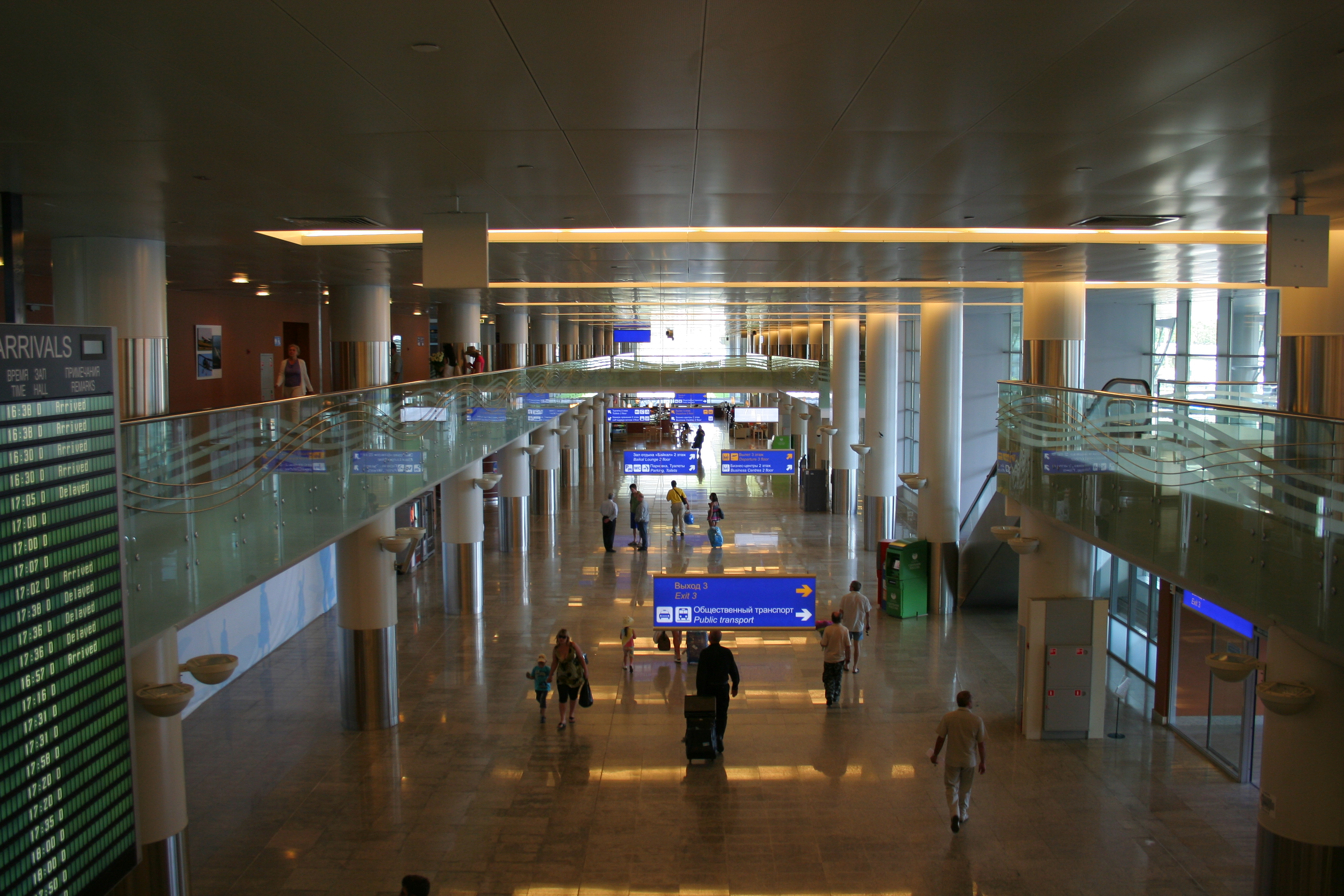
Interior of Terminal D

On 28 October 2018, Terminal D started handling all of Rossiya Airlines' Moscow-originating domestic flights and its international service to Indonesia.

==== Terminal E ====
Terminal E opened in 2010 as a capacity expansion project, connecting terminals D and F. The terminal's construction has allowed for the development of terminals D and F, as well as the railway station, into a single south terminal complex. The terminals of this complex are connected by a number of pedestrian walkways with travelators, thus allowing for passengers to move freely between its constituent facilities. In December 2010, a new chapel dedicated to St. Nicholas opened on the second floor of Terminal E. The terminal was used for international flights, primarily by Aeroflot and its SkyTeam partners. Terminal E has 8 jetway equipped gates. The V-Express Transit Hotel between security/passport check-ins provided short-term accommodations for passengers changing planes without having to present a visa for entering Russia. The hotel drew international attention in June 2013 when Edward Snowden checked into the hotel while seeking asylum.

== Airlines and destinations ==
=== Passenger ===
The following airlines serve regular scheduled and charter destinations at Sheremetyevo International Airport.

Airlines	Destinations
Aeroflot	Abu Dhabi, Almaty, Ankara, Arkhangelsk–Talagi, Astana, Bangkok–Suvarnabhumi, Beijing–Daxing, Bukhara, Cairo, Cheboksary, Delhi, Denpasar, Dubai–International, Elista, Enfidha, Gelendzhik, Gorno-Altaysk, Guangzhou, Ho Chi Minh City, Hurghada, Istanbul, Izhevsk, Kemerovo, Khabarovsk, Krasnodar, Malé, Mauritius, Minsk, Nha Trang, Orsk, Penza, Petropavlovsk-Kamchatsky, Phu Quoc, Phuket, Samarqand, Sanya, Sharm El Sheikh, Şymkent, Tehran–Imam Khomeini, Ulan-Ude, Urgench, Vladivostok, Yakutsk, Yuzhno-Sakhalinsk; Seasonal: Bodrum, Colombo–Bandaranaike, Dalaman, Goa–Dabolim, Hong Kong, Mahé
Air Algérie	Algiers
Air Cairo	El Alamein, Sharm El Sheikh
Air China	Beijing–Capital, Ürümqi
Air Serbia	Belgrade
AlMasria Universal Airlines	Seasonal charter: Sharm El Sheikh
Ariana Afghan Airlines	Kabul
Armenian Airlines	Yerevan (suspended)
Beijing Capital Airlines	Hangzhou, Qingdao
Belavia	Brest, Homiel, Mahilyow, Minsk
beOnd	Red Sea (begins 18 December 2026)
Centrum Air	Samarqand, Tashkent
China Eastern Airlines	Beijing–Daxing, Shanghai–Pudong, Shenyang, Xi'an
China Southern Airlines	Beijing–Daxing, Guangzhou, Shenzhen, Ürümqi, Wuhan
Etihad Airways	Abu Dhabi
Gulf Air	Bahrain
Hainan Airlines	Beijing–Capital, Haikou
Mahan Air	Mashhad
Nordwind Airlines	Oral, Pyongyang; Seasonal charter: Nha Trang
Oman Air	Muscat; Seasonal charter: Salalah
Pobeda	Nalchik, Tyumen, Yekaterinburg
Pyramids Airlines	Seasonal cherter: Monastir
Qatar Airways	Doha
Red Sea Airlines	Seasonal charter: Sharm El Sheikh
Rossiya Airlines	Anadyr, Arkhangelsk–Talagi, Blagoveshchensk, Dubai–Al Maktoum (begins 10 December 2026), Izhevsk, Kaliningrad, Khabarovsk, Magadan, Penza, Sochi, Yuzhno-Sakhalinsk
Royal Air Maroc	Casablanca
Shirak Avia	Yerevan
Sichuan Airlines	Chengdu–Tianfu
Sky Vision Airlines	Seasonal charter: Sharm El Sheikh
Smartavia	Arkhangelsk–Talagi, Orenburg
Southwind Airlines	Seasonal charter: Antalya, Bodrum, Dalaman, Istanbul
Sun PhuQuoc Airways	Seasonal charter: Phu Quoc
Syrian Air	Aleppo, Damascus
Tianjin Airlines	Seasonal: Chongqing
VietJet Air	Seasonal charter: Da Nang
Vietnam Airlines	Hanoi, Ho Chi Minh City, Nha Trang
Yamal Airlines	Novy Urengoy, Salekhard

=== Cargo ===
Airlines	Destinations
Turkish Cargo	Istanbul

== Statistics ==
Annual passenger statistics of Sheremetyevo (2010–2025)
Year	Passengers	References
2010	19,123,010	
2011	22,351,320	
2012	25,959,820	
2013	28,974,820	
2014	31,568,000	
2015	31,612,000	
2016	34,030,000	
2017	40,093,000	
2018	45,836,000	

Annual in-depth passenger statistics of Sheremetyevo (2014–2019)
Year	Total passengers	International passengers	Domestic passengers	Flight movements	References
2014	31,568,000	18,493,000	13,075,000	255,570	
2015	31,612,000	17,804,000	13,809,000	265,040	
2016	34,030,000	18,863,000	15,167,000	272,970	
2017	40,093,000	22,124,000	17,969,000	308,220	
2018	45,836,000	24,695,000	21,141,000	357,228	

Top passenger routes from Sheremetyevo (12 January 2026)
Rank	Destinations	Flights per week
1	St. Petersburg	161
2	Sochi	69
3	Yekaterinburg	54
4	Kaliningrad	52
5	Mineralnye Vody	50
6	Istanbul	47
7	Kazan	44
8	Krasnodar	44
9	Minsk	42
10	Murmansk	41

== Ground transport ==
=== Rail ===
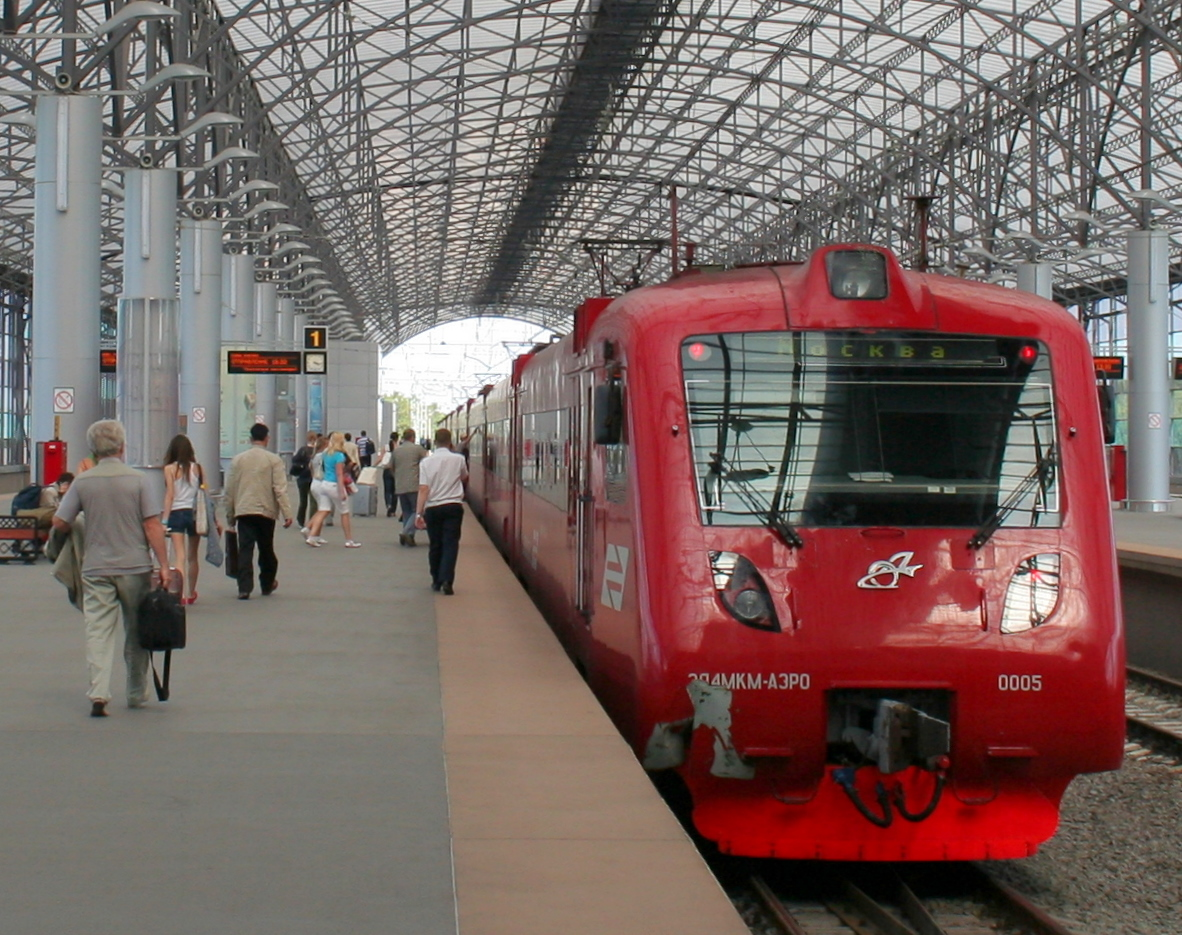
Aeroexpress train to Moscow's Belorussky station

Aeroexpress, a subsidiary of Russian Railways operates a nonstop line, connecting the airport to Belorussky station in downtown Moscow. A one-way journey takes 35 minutes. The trains offer adjustable seats, luggage compartments, restrooms, electric outlets. Business-class coaches available.

The service started in November 2004, when express train connection was established from Savyolovsky station to Lobnya station, which is 7 km (4.3 mi) from the airport, with the remainder of the journey served by bus or taxi. On 10 June 2008, a 60,000-square-metre (650,000 sq ft) rail terminal opened in front of Terminal F, with direct service from Savyolovsky station. A shuttle bus service ferried passengers to terminals B and C. From 28 August 2009, the line was extended to Belorussky station with plans to serve all three of Moscow's main airports from a single point of boarding, and service to Savyolovsky station terminated.

=== Interterminal underground ===
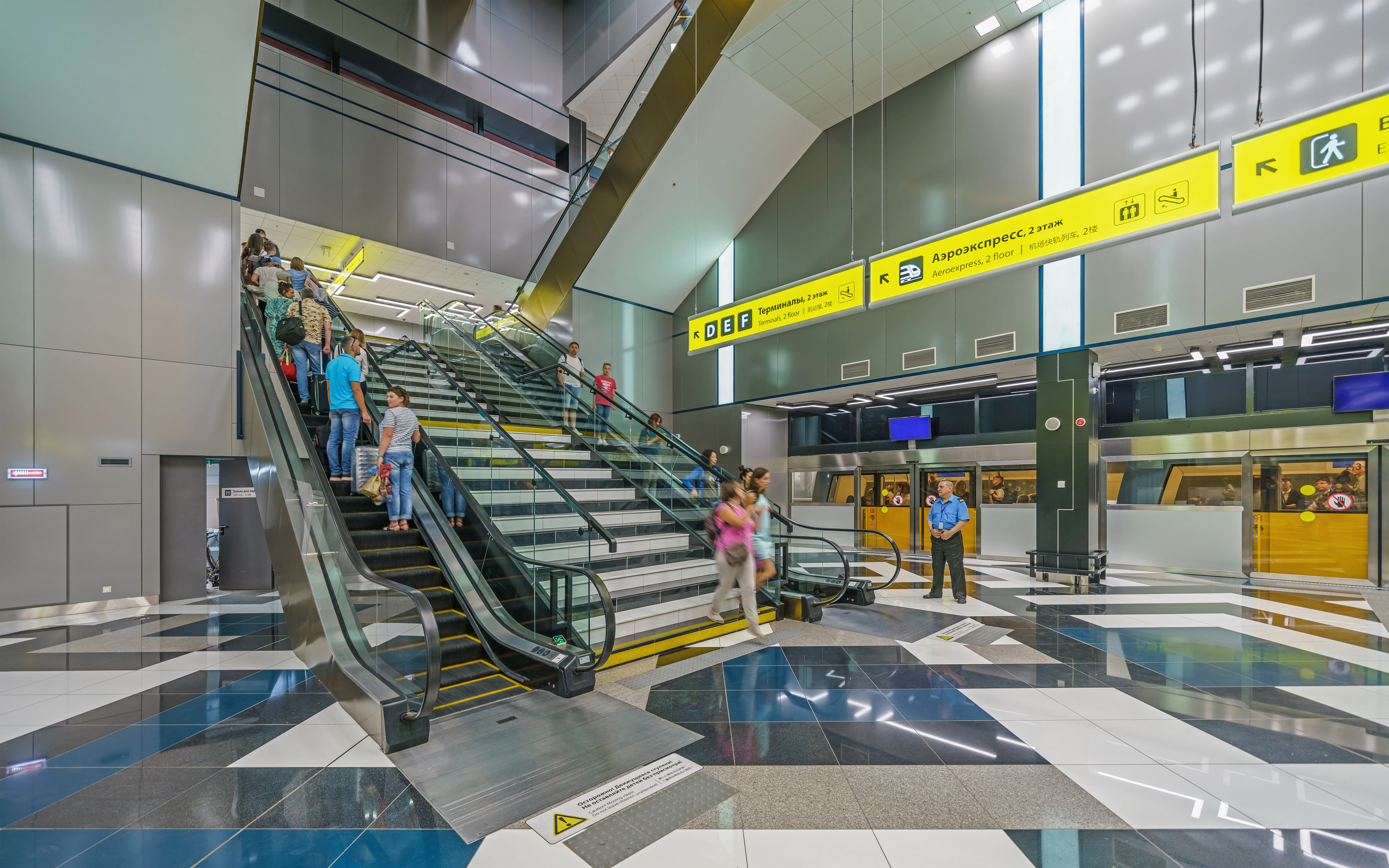
South station of the people mover

The airport's Automated Passenger Transportation System (APTS) connects the Terminal B and C with the Terminals D, E, F and the Aeroexpress railway station.

At the 1st floor of the Terminal B there is an entrance to Sheremetyevo 1 — the northern station. The entrance to Sheremetyevo 2 — the southern station — is at the passage between the terminals D and E.

The APTS is a part of the Interterminal underground passage — a dual tunnel transportation system in the airport. One of the tunnels is dedicated to the transportation of people and featuring an automated people mover (APM). The other tunnel is used for automated baggage transportation.

=== Bus ===
Moscow can be reached by the municipal Mosgortrans bus lines: 817 to station Planernaya of Moscow Metro Tagansko-Krasnopresnenskaya Line (#7), 851 to station Rechnoy Vokzal of Zamoskvoretskaya Line (#2), departures every 10 minutes, travel time 33–55 minutes by schedule depending on the terminal served. At night time bus N1 (Russian: Н1) (departures every 30 minutes between 3am and 5:40am) connects the airport to Moscow's Leningradsky Avenue, downtown area and Leninsky Avenue. Travel time 30–90 minutes, fare is 57 rubles (as of February 2021).

Other buses serve the connections to the nearby cities: Lobnya (route 21), Zelenograd, Khimki (routes 43,62), Dolgoprudny.

=== Road ===
The main road leading to the airport—Leningradskoye Highway—has experienced large traffic jams. Since 23 December 2014, a toll road to the airport has been opened. It connects with MKAD near Dmitrovskoe Highway. Now it is possible to reach the airport in ten minutes, avoiding traffic jams.

== Accidents and incidents ==
- On 26 September 1960, Austrian Airlines Flight 901 crashed 11 km (6.8 mi) short of the runway at Sheremetyevo Airport. Of the 37 people on board, 31 died.
- On 28 November 1972, Japan Air Lines Flight 446, a DC-8-62, crashed while in an initial climb on a route from Sheremetyevo International Airport to Haneda Airport. There were 14 crew members and 62 board the aircraft. A total of 9 crew and 52 passengers died, with a total of 61 of 76 occupants dead.
- On 28 November 1976, Aeroflot Flight 2415, a Tupolev Tu-104 crashed shortly after takeoff as result of artificial horizon failure. All 67 passengers and six crew members died in the crash.
- On 6 July 1982, Aeroflot Flight 411, an Ilyushin Il-62, crashed on takeoff; all 90 on board died.
- On 22 July 2002, Pulkovo Aviation Enterprise Flight 9560, an Ilyushin Il-86, crashed on takeoff; 14 of the 16 occupants on board died.
- On 3 June 2014, Ilyushin Il-96 RA-96010 of Aeroflot was damaged beyond economical repair in a fire whilst parked.
- On 5 May 2019, Aeroflot Flight 1492, a Sukhoi Superjet 100, crash-landed and caught fire after returning to the airport due to an on-board malfunction shortly after takeoff, killing 41 of the 78 passengers and crew on board and injuring 11 others.

== Awards and accolades ==
In 2018, Sheremetyevo International Airport was recognized for the best customer service in the busiest airports in Europe category by ACI's global Airport Service Quality (ASQ) program. In 2018, Sheremetyevo entered the list of the world's best airports – ACI Director General's Roll of Excellence. The Official Aviation Guide (OAG) ranked Sheremetyevo International Airport as the most punctual major airport (20 – 30 million departing seats) in the world for 2018, with an on-time performance of 87%.

In February 2019, SVO won an award for strengthening Russia's national security with its perimeter protection system. In February 2019, Sheremetyevo on top in on-time departure performance in the Major Airports category for February 2019, with 93.65% flights departed on time. In March 2019, Sheremetyevo International Airport was officially awarded a 5-star terminal rating from Skytrax, with Terminal B receiving the 5-star rating after a comprehensive audit.

== See also ==
- List of the busiest airports in Russia
- List of the busiest airports in Europe
- List of the busiest airports in the former USSR
