= Sergey Sheremetev =

Count Sergey Sheremetev
- Сергей Дмитриевич Шереметев
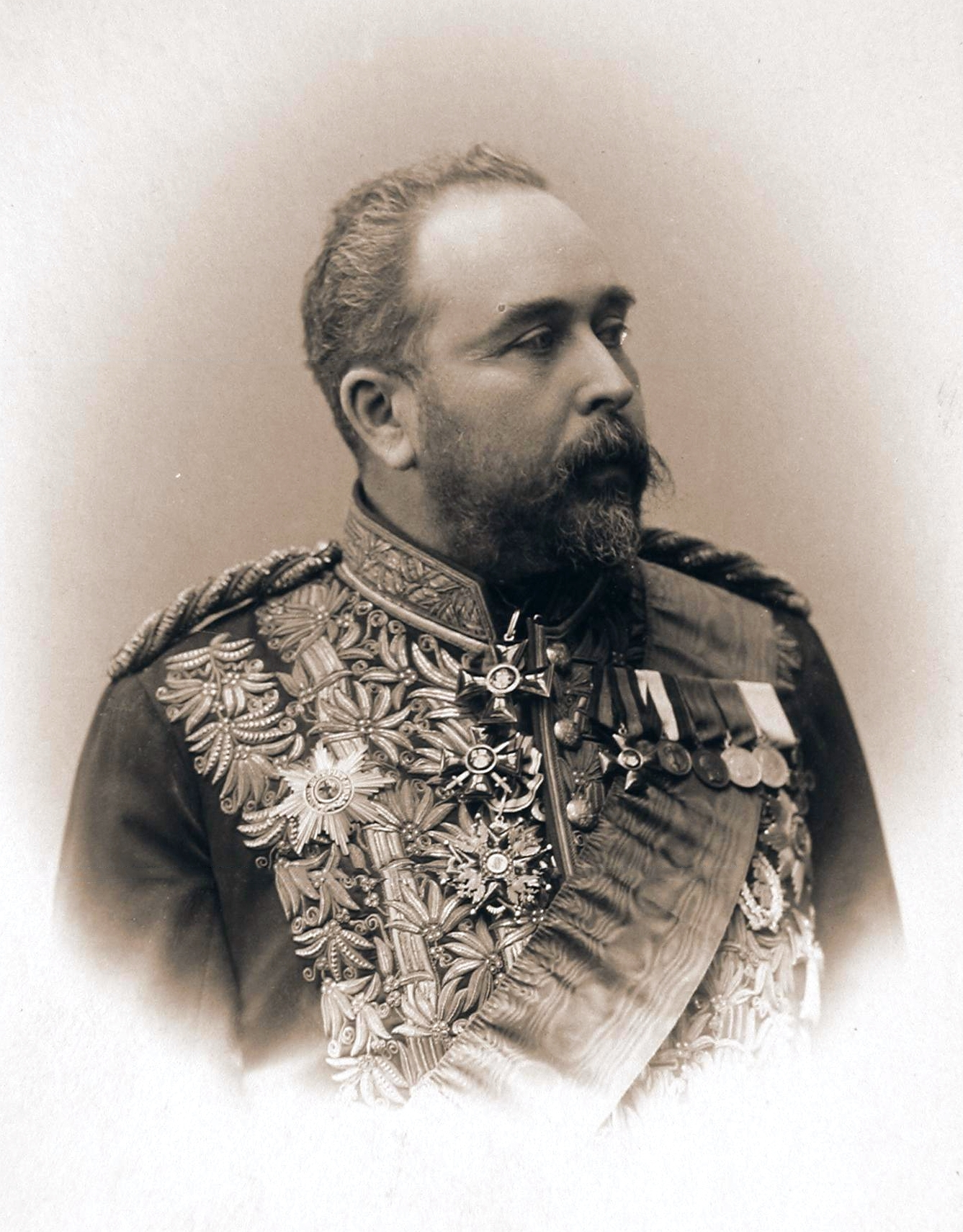

Moscow Provincial Marshal of the Nobility
- In office 31 January 1885 – 8 March 1890

Personal details
- Born: Sergey Dmitriyevich Sheremetev; 26 November 1844 Russian Empire
- Died: 17 December 1918 (aged 74) Moscow
- Resting place: Novospassky Monastery
- Party: Russian Assembly
- Parent: Dmitri Sheremetev (father)
- Education: Page Corps
- Known for: Chairman of the Archaeographic Commission
- Awards: Order of Saint Alexander Nevsky; Order of the White Eagle; Order of Saint Vladimir; Order of Saint Anna; Order of Saint Stanislaus; Order of the Dannebrog; Order of the Medjidie; Order of Leopold; Order of the Red Eagle

Military service
- Allegiance: Russian Empire
- Rank: Active State Councillor
- Unit: Imperial Russian Army
- Battles/wars: Russo-Turkish War

Count Sergey Dmitrievich Sheremetev (Russian: Серге́й Дми́триевич Шереме́тев; November 14 [November 26], 1844, Saint Petersburg – December 17, 1918, Moscow) was a Russian public figure, historian, collector. A rich landowner, he owned the Kuskovo, Mikhailovskoye (since 1870), Vvedenskoye and Ostafyevo estates in Moscow Governorate, and the Fountain House Saint Petersburg (since 1871) Oberjägermeister since 1904, he held the Active State Councillor rank. The Sheremetyevskaya railway station was named after him, after which in turn the Sheremetyevo Airport was later named.

== Biography ==
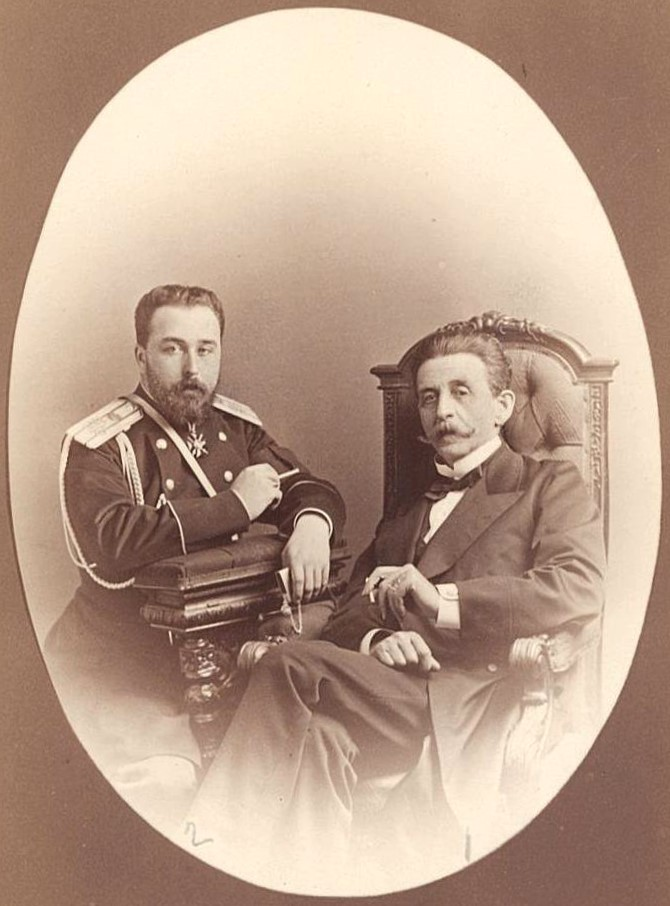
Sergey Sheremetev (at left) and Boris Sheremetev around 1880

Born into the family of Count Dmitry Nikolaevich Sheremetev and Countess Anna Sergeevna Sheremeteva.

He was educated at home and passed exams at the Page Corps. In 1863, with the rank of cornet, he joined the Cavalry Guards Regiment; from 1865 - lieutenant, from May 1866 - regimental adjutant, from 1867 - staff captain. In 1868, with the rank of captain, he was appointed adjutant to Tsarevich Alexander Alexandrovich.

From 1872 he was deputy of the nobility of the Shlisselburgsky Uyezd of the Saint Petersburg Governorate. In 1873-1875 he was honorary justice of the peace for the Shlisselburg district; from 1874 - colonel.

In 1876–1879, in 1885–1888, in 1902–1905, in 1905–1908, in 1908-1911 and in 1911-1914 he was honorary justice of the peace for the Podolsky uezd of the Moscow Governorate.

He took part in the Russo-Turkish War of 1877–1878 as part of the Ruschuk detachment, which was commanded by the future Emperor Alexander III; he was awarded the Order of Saint Vladimir 3rd class with swords.

In 1881 he was appointed aide-de-camp to Alexander III and in 1884 he received the Active State Councillor rank.

From 1883 to 1894 he was the head of the St. Petersburg State Academic Capella; from 1885 — trustee of the House of Empress Alexandra Feodorovna for the care of the poor in St. Petersburg and member of the Council of the Lyceum in memory of Tsarevich Nicholas; from 1890 — honorary member of the Russian Academy of Sciences.

In 1885 he was elected Moscow provincial Marshal of Nobility. From 1892 he was the master of the hunt of the Imperial Court. In 1897 he was appointed a member of the "Special Conference on Affairs of the Nobility" and in a note submitted to the Emperor, he stated:

Russia developed and was created independently, and therefore everything essential in it is original; and the Church, with all its universal significance, is unique, and its monarchy is unique; its nobility is also unique: it is not comparable to the European descendants of knights - the brainchild of feudalism. We did not have feudalism, and we did not have castles. Our castles are our monasteries, beacons of education, engines of colonization, hotbeds of charity ... Our legislation cannot fail to take into account these features of our independent development, with this uniqueness of Russia.

In 1898-1904 and in 1910-1916 he was an honorary justice of the peace for the Zvenigorodsky Uyezd of the Moscow Governorate

In 1900-1917 he served as member of the State Council and a member of the right group Russian Assembly, and concurrently served as chairman of the Imperial archaeological commission.

In 1900-1901 he was the chairman of the commission for the analysis and description of the archive of the Most Holy Synod and since 1901 he was the Chairman of the Committee for the Guardianship of Russian Icon Painting and Honorary Trustee of the Belgorod Gymnasium (in 1904 he was approved for another three-year term). Since 1902 — Trustee of the Krasnoslobodsk Orphanage, and since 1910 also Trustee of the Krasnoslobodsk Zemstvo Primary School — in the Trubchevsky Uyezd of the Oryol Governorate.

Since 1908 he served as Chairman of the Nikolaev Orthodox Brotherhood in Memory of Tsarevich Nikolai Alexandrovich; since 1910 — Trustee of the Ushakov School in the Shuysky Uyezd of the Vladimir Governorate; Since 1911 — trustee of the Konstantinovsky Zemstvo Primary School in the Moscow Province. Since 1912 he was honorary member of the Construction Committee for the construction of a church in memory of the 300th anniversary of the reign of the House of Romanov and member of a special committee for the establishment of a museum of 1812 in Moscow. In 1914 he was appointed member of the Romanov Committee for assisting in the care of rural orphans regardless of class or religion, as well as for the unification of government, public and private activities in this area.

As of March 1, 1917, he "owned a fortune estimated at 37.9 million rubles, of which 19% was invested in shares and bonds, 28% in urban real estate and 51% in agricultural land, outbuildings and livestock".

He died in Moscow in The Corner House on Vozdvizhenka Street. He was buried in the New Cemetery of the Novospassky Monastery, which had long served as the burial place of the descendants of Andrei Kobyla. Sheremetev's last words were: "I am dying with deep faith in Russia. It will be reborn.".

On December 17, 2021, the Novospassky Monastery honored the memory of Count Sergei Dmitrievich Sheremetev. A memorial litiya was held in the Church of Roman the Melodist, after which the memorial plaque was consecrated.
