= Ivan Romanov =

Uncle of Tsar Michael I (died 1640)

Ivan Nikitich Romanov, Russian Иван Никитич Романов (1560 – 16 July 1640) was the uncle of Tsar Michael I, first Romanov Tsar of Russia.

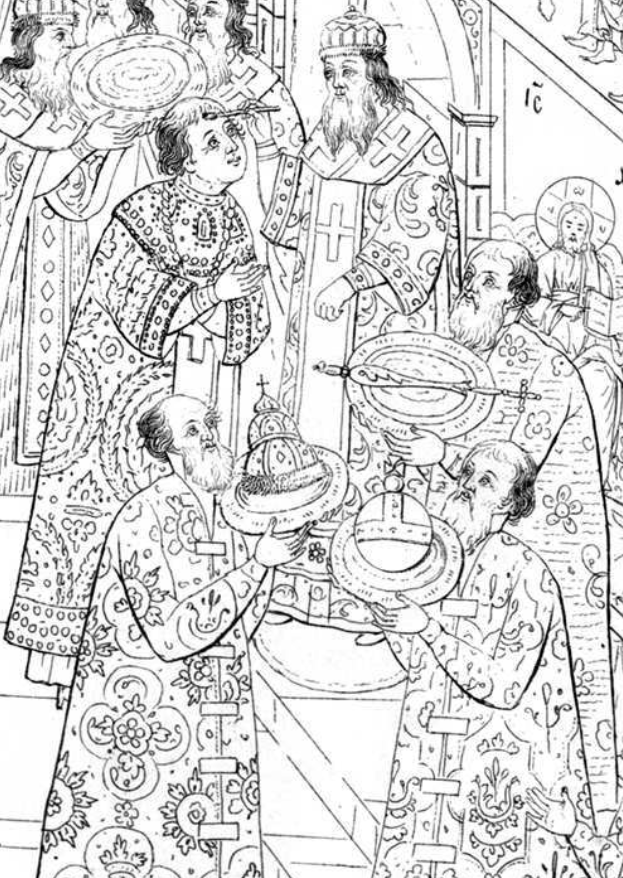
Anointing of Michael as Tsar. Metropolitan Ephraim anoints Michael of Russia, the crown is held by Ivan Nikitich Romanov, the scepter by Dmitry Troubetskoy, and the orb by Dmitry Pozharsky. "Coronation Album of Michael Romanov", 1673.

== Background ==
Ivan was the seventh child and second surviving son of Nikita Romanovich Zakharyin by his second wife, Princess Evdokiya Alexandrovna Gorbataya-Shuyskaya (d. 4 April 1581). Ivan had two half-sisters, the daughters of his father by an earlier marriage, and ten full siblings, many of whom died young. Among his full siblings was his elder brother Feodor Nikitich Romanov, the father of Mikhail Fedorovich, first Romanov Tsar of Russia.

Ivan's father, Nikita Romanovich Zakharyin, was the brother of Tsarina Anastasia Romanovna, first wife of Tsar Ivan the terrible. He was one of the closest advisors of that Tsar, and later served for two years as regent for his underage nephew Feodor I. The family was therefore politically influential and very affluent; Nikita Romanov was one of the largest landowners in Russia.

== Loss of election ==
The Rurikid dynasty became extinct with the death of Tsar Feodor I (Ivan's first cousin) in 1598. Russia then went through the Time of Troubles, a time of civil war and foreign occupation interspersed with drought and famine. Finally, in 1612-13, Prince Dmitry Pozharsky drove the Poles out of the Kremlin and convened a Grand National Assembly to elect a new Tsar. Ivan, as a leading member of the Romanov family, was a serious candidate for the throne. This was particularly so because his elder brother, Feodor Nikitich Romanov, Patriarch of Moscow, was at that time a captive of the Polish-Lithuanian monarch Sigismund III Vasa; Feodor's wife and children were living at the Ipatievsky Monastery in remote Kostroma.

Nevertheless, the Grand National Assembly unanimously elected the captive Feodor's underage son, Mikhail Fedorovich, as the new Tsar, even though Mikhail was not even present there at that time. When the Cossacks gave their support to his nephew Mikhail, Ivan Nikitich purportedly said to them: "This prince Mikhail Fedorovich is too young and not yet in his full reason." As a result, his brother and nephew tended to mistrust Ivan in later years, and he never held any governmental posts under their rule. However, he was made a boyar, and as the Tsar's uncle, was one of the highest-ranking nobles of the land. He is said to have been the greatest private proprietor of his day, with vast estates and hundreds of thousands of serfs.

== Personal life ==
Ivan was married to Princess Uliana Fyodorovna Litvinova-Massalaskaya (d. 1650) and had six children by her. They were:

1. Nikita Romanov (c. 1607 – 21 December 1654), Boyar 1645
2. Andrey (d. 25 April 1609)
3. Dmitry (d. 4 November 1611)
4. Irina (d. 10 September 1615)
5. Praskovia (d. 25 October 1622)
6. Ivan (d. 30 July 1625)

Most of Ivan's children died young. The only one of his sons to survive to any advanced age was Nikita Romanov, who did not marry, and who was the last non-royal member of the Romanov family at his death.
