= Lobnya =

Town in Moscow Oblast, Russia

Lobnya Лобня
- Town
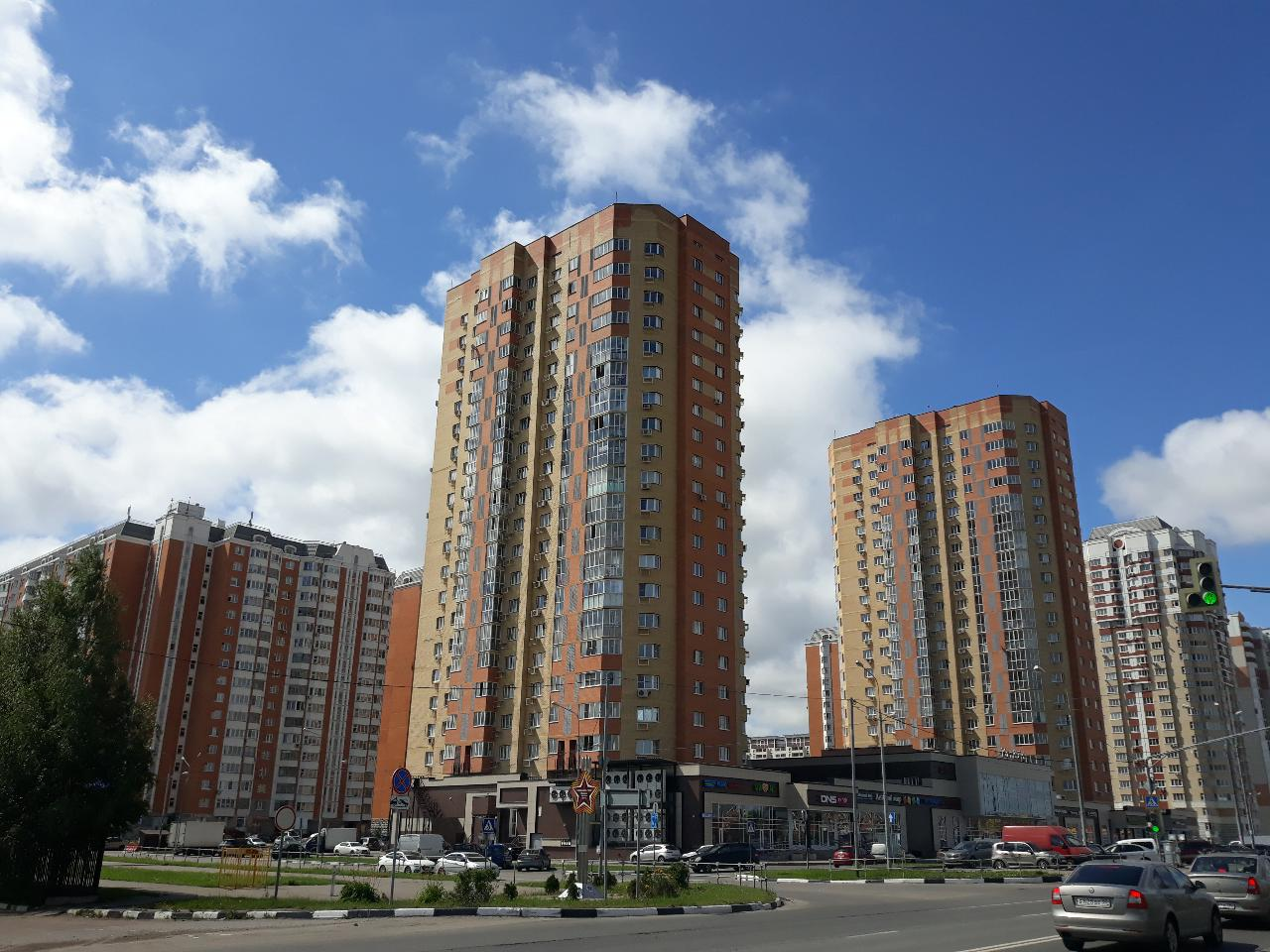

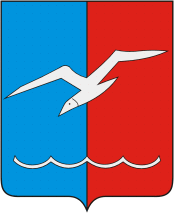
- Flag Coat of arms
- Interactive map of Lobnya
- Location of Lobnya Lobnya (Moscow Oblast)
- Coordinates: 56°01′N 37°29′E
- Country: Russia
- Federal subject: Moscow Oblast
- Founded: 1902
- Town status since: 1961

Government
  - Mayor: Igor Demeshko
- Elevation: 195 m (640 ft)

Population (2010 Census)
  - Total: 74,252
  - Estimate (2025): 82,353 (+10.9%)
  - Rank: 216th in 2010

Administrative status
  - Subordinated to: Lobnya Town Under Oblast Jurisdiction
  - Capital of: Lobnya Town Under Oblast Jurisdiction

Municipal status
  - Urban okrug: Lobnya Urban Okrug
  - Capital of: Lobnya Urban Okrug
- Time zone: UTC+3 (MSK)
- Postal code: 141730
- Dialing code: +7 495
- OKTMO ID: 46740000001
- Website: www.lobnya.ru

Lobnya (Russian: Ло́бня) is a town in Moscow Oblast, Russia, located 30 kilometres (19 mi) north west of Moscow. Population: 82,764 (2021 census); 74,252 (2010 census); 61,567 (2002 census); 60,475 (1989 Soviet census); 30,000 (1970).

Historical population
Year	Pop.	±%
1959	12,249	—
1970	30,491	+148.9%
1979	51,811	+69.9%
1989	60,475	+16.7%
2002	61,567	+1.8%
2010	74,252	+20.6%
2021	82,764	+11.5%
Source: Censuses

== History ==
Lobnya was founded in 1902 and granted town status in 1961.

=== Krasnaya Polyana in the Battle of Moscow ===
The German attack starting the Battle of Moscow (code-named ‘Operation Typhoon’) began on October 2 1941. The attack on a broad front brought German forces to occupy the village of Krasnaya Polyana (now in the town of Lobnya) to Moscow's North West. Krasnaya Polyana was taken on November 30 by Erich Hoepner's 4th Panzer Group. This is accepted by many as the closest point occupied by German forces to Moscow. Less accepted is that this is the closest point visited by Germans to Moscow in the campaign.

Many sources state that at least one German army patrol visited nearby Khimki. Similarly many sources state Khimki as the closest point the Germans reached to Moscow (Khimki at the time was 8 kilometres (5.0 mi) from the edge of Moscow). Among the sources stating the Germans reached Khimki the details of the date and unit involved are inconsistent and disputed. One story of events asserts a skirmish took place in Khimki on October 16 at the Leningradskoye Shosse bridge involving a German motorcycle unit. Another account is a patrol reached Khimki around November 30 or early December before returning to its main unit without combat. The dates mentioned for this second account vary. A myth surrounding this is that the Germans would have been able to see the Kremlin in the distance from Khimki.

The Soviet Army counter offensive for "removing the immediate threat to Moscow" started on December 5 on the North-Western Front (the area around Krasnaya Polyana and Lobnya North West of Moscow). The South-Western Front and Western Fronts began their offensives on December 6. The German forces were driven back. Moscow was never under such close land threat again during the war.

== Administrative and municipal status ==
Within the framework of administrative divisions, it is incorporated as Lobnya Town Under Oblast Jurisdiction—an administrative unit with the status equal to that of the districts. As a municipal division, Lobnya Town Under Oblast Jurisdiction is incorporated as Lobnya Urban Okrug.

== Architecture ==
The environs are rich in architectural monuments, such as the Neo-Gothic estate of Marfino located 9 kilometers (5.6 mi) to the northeast, which was laid out by Field Marshal Pyotr Saltykov in the 1770s but was extensively modernized by Count Panin in 1837–1839. The palace is Gothic in style, scored to resemble a medieval castle; a flight of stairs connects it with a white-stone wharf by the river, decorated with statues of griffins. To the west from the palace stands the Petrine Baroque church of the Virgin's Nativity (1701–1707). There are also a Gothic bridge, stables, and two English parks with picturesque rotundas.

Within two kilometers from Marfino is the manor of Nikolskoye-Prozorovskoye, which contains a Neo-Baroque country house of Field Marshal Prozorovsky and a Neoclassical church of St. Nicholas, built in the 1790s. Nearby is Rozhdestveno-Suvorovo, where the five-domed church of the Virgin's Nativity was built by Princes Baryatinsky at the turn of the 18th century. In 1773, the estate passed to Alexander Suvorov's father, Vasily Suvorov, a general-in-chief who is buried in the church.

The oldest building in the vicinity is the five-domed four-pillared apseless Trinity Church in Chashnikovo (four kilometers from Lobnya). Its elegant Italianate decor, reminiscent of the Chudov Monastery cathedral, dates the church to the early years of the 16th century, when such Italian architects as Aloisio the New were active in Russia. The church was first documented in 1585, when Chashnikovo was owned by Nikita Romanov, grandfather of Tsar Mikhail I. By the end of the 17th century, the estate had passed to Lev Naryshkin, maternal uncle of Peter the Great, who added a bell tower and had the church's decor updated to answer his own Naryshkin Baroque tastes.

Other well-known villages in the vicinity of Lobnya are Zhostovo (seven kilometers to the northeast) and Fedoskino (ten kilometers to the east), renowned for their traditional folk crafts of Zhostovo painting and Fedoskino miniature, respectively.

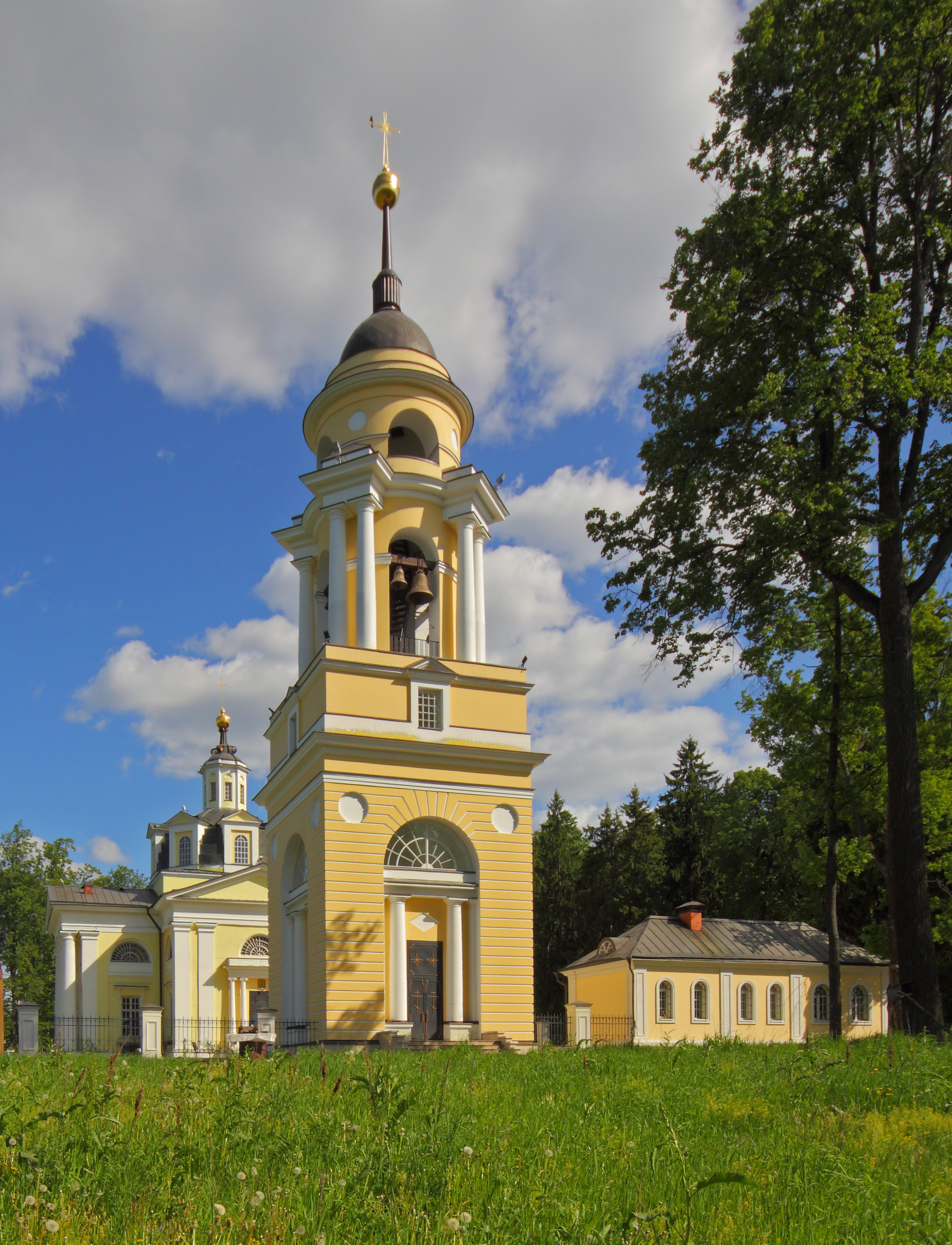
St. Nicholas church in Prozorovskoye

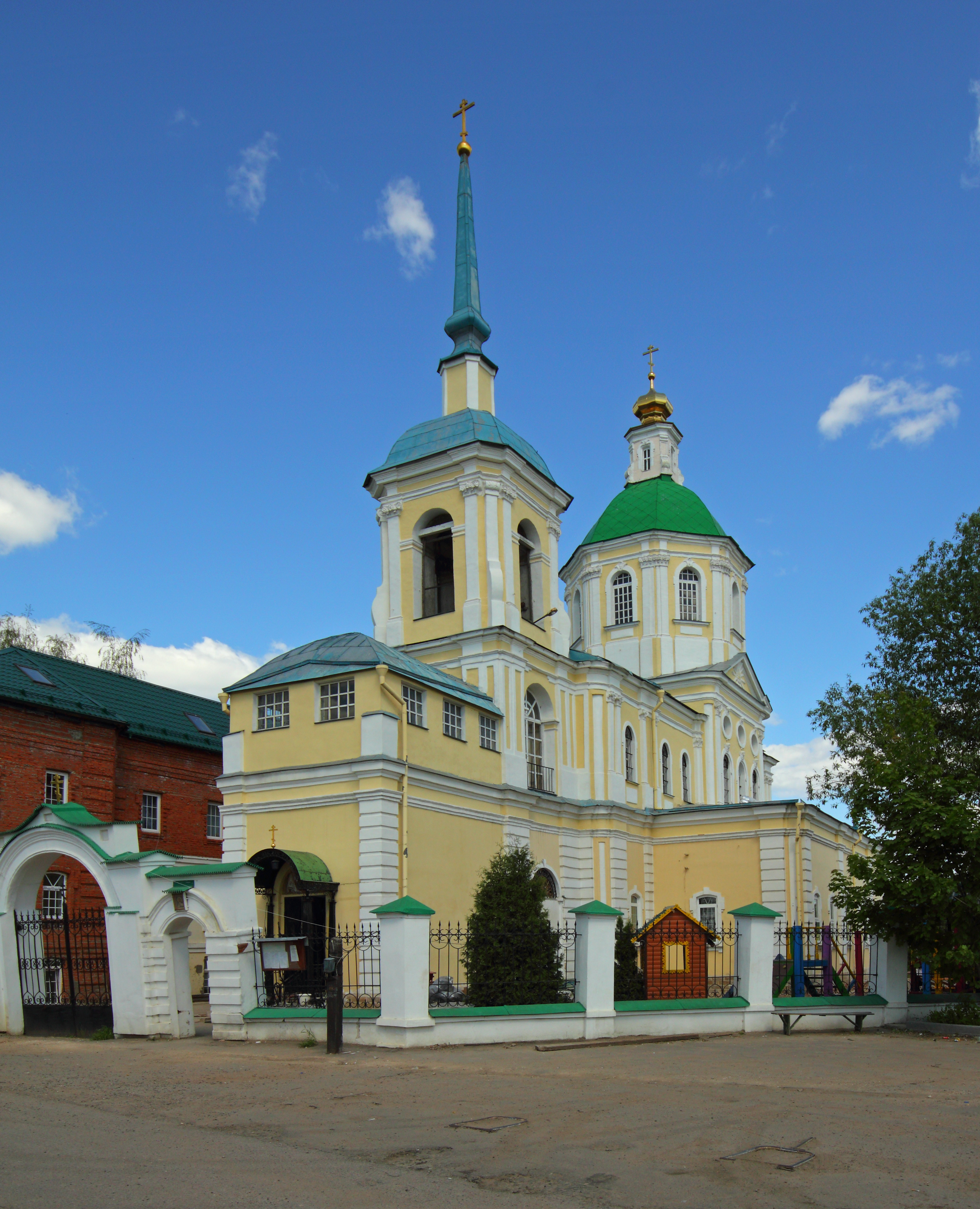
Church of the Holy Mandylion in Kiovo, Lobnya

== Notable people ==
- Mikhail Mishustin (b. 1966), Russian politician (Prime Minister of Russia)
