= Sheremetyevskaya railway station =

Railway station in Moscow Oblast, Russia

Sheremetyevskaya Шереметьевская
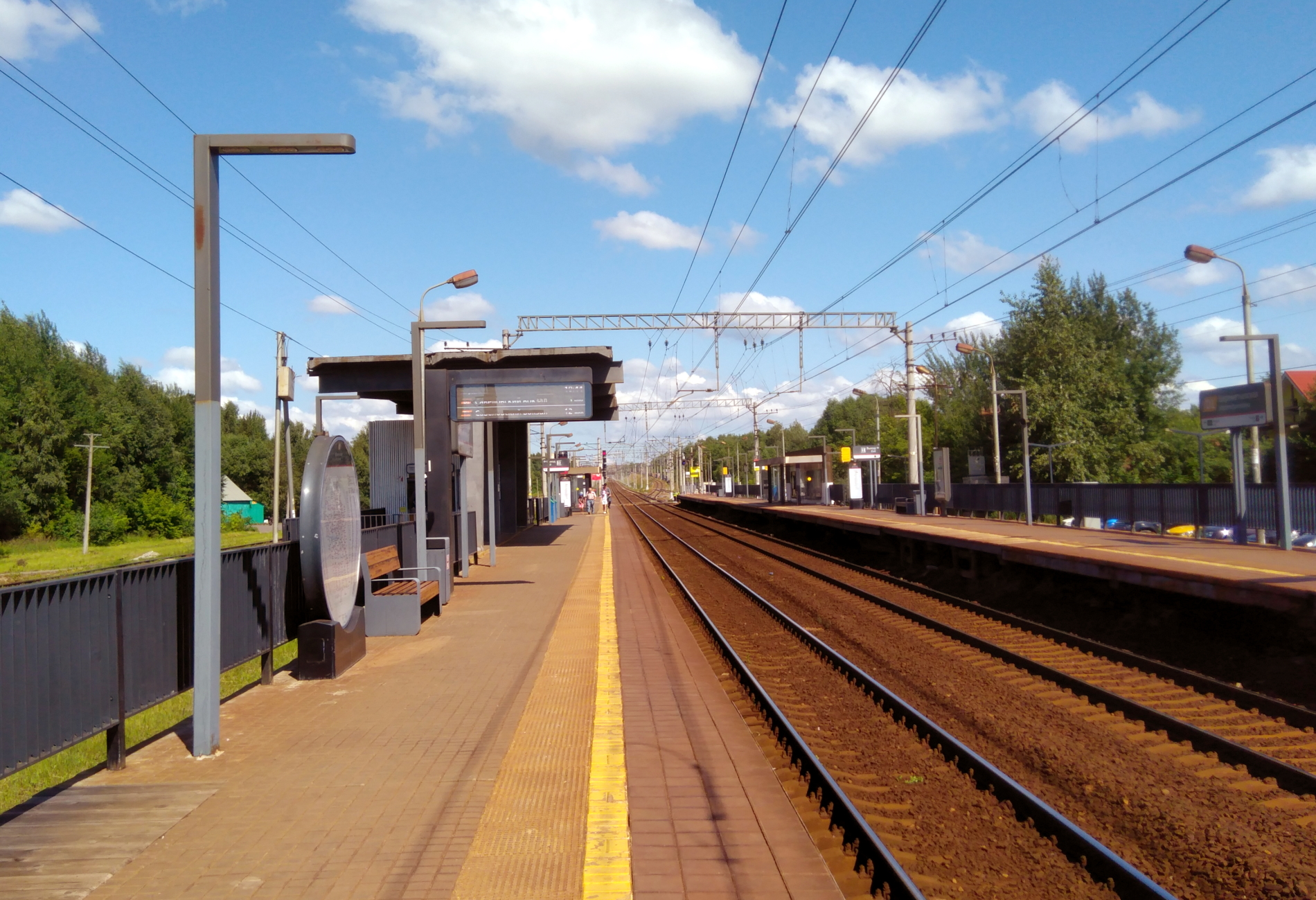

General information
- Location: Sheremetyevsky, Dolgoprudny, Moscow Oblast; Russia
- Coordinates: 55°59′01″N 37°29′55″E
- System: Moscow Railway platform
- Owner: Russian Railways
- Operator: Central Suburban Passenger Company
- Platforms: 2
- Tracks: 2

Construction
- Structure type: At-grade

History
- Opened: 1901

Services
Preceding station	Moscow Central Diameters	Following station
Khlebnikovo towards Odintsovo	Line D1	Lobnya Terminus
Route map
Location

Sheremetyevskaya (Russian: Шереметьевская) is a railway station of the Savyolovsky line of the Moscow Railway in the microdistrict Sheremetyevsky of the city of Dolgoprudny, Moscow Oblast. The station is part of the line D1 "Belorussko-Savelovsky" of the Moscow Central Diameters.

== History ==
The station was opened in 1901 and named after the initiator of its opening, Count Sergey Sheremetev. The owner of the forest lands through which the tracks of the Savyolovsky line of the Moscow Railway were laid in 1900, planned to derive income from leasing his land plots for dacha construction in the settlement that developed around.

Travel time from Savyolovsky station is 35 minutes and is part of the Moscow Central Diameters, line MCD-1.

The station consists of two side platforms connected by a deck. To the west of the platform there is a non-electrified access road from Lobnya station to the Paveltsevskaya oil depot and is used only for freight traffic.

Sheremetyevo International Airport is located in the vicinity of the platform. Immediately to the north of the platform there is a double-track branch from the main line of the Savyolovsky direction to the Sheremetyevo Airport railway station, the route to the airport goes along the overpass to the north above the main line. The branch is located within the boundaries of Lobnya station, the entrance signal for the II main line is located south of the platform, that is, the eastern platform is also within the boundaries of the station; the entrance signal for the I track (the wrong one) is located north of the platform, the western platform is already on the Lobnya - Mark section.
