= Nikita Romanov =

Nikita Ivanovich Romanov (Russian Никита Иванович Романов) (c. 1607 – 21 December 1654) was a first cousin of Tsar Michael of Russia. His cousin Michael became the first Romanov Tsar of Russia by election in 1613. Nikita (and his father) were the nearest kin of the Tsar, but also the last members of the Romanov family who were not royal.

== Biography ==
Nikita was born the eldest surviving son of Ivan Romanov by his wife, Princess Uliana Fyodorovna Litvinova-Massalaskaya. He was named 'Nikita' in honour of his paternal grandfather Nikita Romanovich. Ivan Romanov was the second son of Nikita Romanovich and the younger brother of Feodor Nikitich Romanov.

Nikita's grandfather, Nikita Romanovich, had been the brother of Tsarina Anastasia Romanovna, first wife of Ivan the terrible, and had served as regent for his nephew Feodor I in the years 1584–86. The family was thus influential in politics, and was also wealthy; Ivan Romanov, though only a second son, was reputed to be the largest private landowner of his day.

Nevertheless, it was the senior branch of the family who was destined to sit on the throne of Russia. Michael Fedorovich Romanov, the young son of Feodor Nikitich Romanov, himself the elder son of Nikita Romanovich, was elected Tsar of Russia by the nobility in an election held in February 1613, after the old Rurikid dynasty had become completely extinct. At that time, Nikita's father Ivan had also been a candidate for the throne. Indeed, he had been present at the venue of the election, whereas neither his brother Feodor nor his nephew Mikhail had been present. He had promoted his own candidature vigorously, and when the Cossacks had spoken in favour of Mikhail, he had spoken in opposition, saying "This prince Mikhail Fedorovich is too young and not yet in his full reason." Due to this incident, he had been looked at with mistrust afterwards by his brother and nephew, the new Tsar.

Perhaps due to his resentment connected to this background, Nikita Romanov was a notorious frondeur (habitual dissenter; always malcontent) throughout his life, and was often berated by his uncle Patriarch Filaret for his attitude. However, while he griped and growled incessantly, he never actually harmed his kinsmen in any way, and was also left by them in peace to enjoy his great wealth, his massive estates and properties.

This Nikita did in European style rather than Russian style. He enamoured of European ways and fashions, which he preferred to Russian customs and culture. Adam Olearius tells us that he liked foreign music, dressed himself and even his servants in European clothes, and insisted on clean-shaven faces for his servitors and subordinates, as against the normal Russian custom of keeping beards.

He never married, and was the only surviving non-royal member of the Romanov family at the time of his death. In future, all those who bore the name of Romanov would be descendants of Tsar Michael of Russia and therefore of royal birth. By definition, the Romanov family are agnatic descendants of Nikita's grandfather Nikita Romanovich. More distant non-royal branches of the family are known by other surnames, including Zakharyin-Yuriev, Koshkin and Kobyla. The earliest known patrilineal ancestor of the family is Andrei Kobyla.

== Source ==
- Polovtsova, A. A. (1918). "Романов, Никита Иванович". Русский биографический словарь (Russian Biographical Dictionary) (in Russian).
