= Koshkin =

Koshkin is a Russian surname, which means "cat" or cat owner", from the Russian word koshka or "cat". An alternative spelling is Koshkyn, and a name with the same meaning is Kotov. The name Koshkin may refer to:

- Aleksandr Koshkyn (1959– 2012), Russian boxer
- Dmitriy Koshkin (born 1986), Kazakh skier
- Ivan Fyodorovich Koshkin (died 1427), Russian nobleman
- Mikhail Koshkin (1898–1940), Russia tank designer
- Nikita Koshkin (born 1956), Russian classical guitarist and composer
- Zakhary Ivanovich Koshkin (died 1461), Russian nobleman
