= Roman Zakharyin-Koshkin =

Russian boyar (died 1543)

Roman Yurievich Zakharyin
- Born: c. 1500
- Died: 16 February 1543 (aged 42–43)
- Noble family: Romanov
- Spouse: Juliana Fedorovna Karpova
- Issue: Nikita Romanovich; Anastasia Romanovna

Roman Yurievich Zakharin-Yuriev (Russian: Роман Юрьевич Захарьин), also known as Roman Zakharyin-Yuriev (Russian: Роман Захарьин-Юрьев) and Roman Zakharyin-Koshkin (Russian: Роман Захарьин-Кошкин); c. 1500 – 16 February 1543) was a Russian okolnichy and voivode who is best known as the progenitor of the Romanov dynasty, which was named after him.

== Biography ==
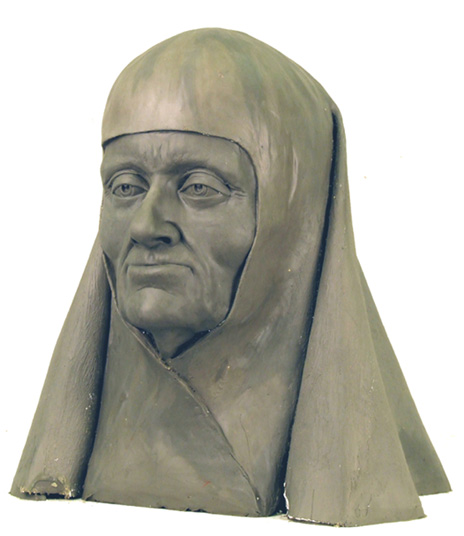
Facial reconstruction of Roman's wife, Juliana Fedorovna Karpova, by Sergey Nikitin

He was the father of Nikita Romanovich, a boyar, and Anastasia Romanovna, who would become the first Russian tsaritsa. He was also the grandfather of Patriarch Filaret and Feodor I of Russia. His father was Yuri Zakharyevich Koshkin, the son of Zakhary Ivanovich Koshkin, a descendant of Andrei Kobyla.

There is very little available information about him; it is known that he was a voivode in the 1530s, his wife was Juliana Fedorovna Karpova, daughter of Russian publicist and diplomat Fedor Ivanovich Karpov (d. 1540). Roman died on 16 February 1543.

It was later found that he was between 178 and 183 cm (approximately six feet) tall and suffered from Paget's disease, which, according to historian Alexander Shirokorad, may have caused him to leave service as voivode in 1535.

== Sources ==
- Alexander Shirokorad: Путь к трону (AST, 2004). ISBN 5170243405, ISBN 5271092763.
- ThePeerage.com: Roman Yurievich Zahar'in
