= Tsarevich Dmitry Ivanovich of Russia =

Tsarevich Dmitry Ivanovich of Russia may refer to one of the following two sons of Ivan the Terrible:

- Tsarevich Dmitry Ivanovich of Russia (born 1552)
- Tsarevich Dmitry Ivanovich of Russia (born 1582)
