= Ivan Fyodorovich Koshkin =

Russian boyar (d. 1427)

Ivan Fyodorovich Koshkin (died 1427) was a boyar and Voivode at the court of Vasily I and Vasily II.

He was a son of Fedor Andreevich Kobylin and a progenitor of the Romanov dynasty. He had four sons: Ivan Ivanovich Koshkin, Fedor Ivanovich Koshkin, Yakov Ivanovich Koshkin, and Zakhary Ivanovich Koshkin. The latter was an ancestor of the very first tsaritsa, Anastasia Romanovna, the wife of tsar Ivan IV of Russia, nicknamed "the Terrible."
