= Nikita Romanovich Zakharyin-Yuriev =

Russian boyar (c. 1522–1586)

Nikita Romanovich
- Born: c. 1522; Tsardom of Russia
- Died: 23 April 1586; Tsardom of Russia
- Spouse: Varvara Ivanovna Khovrina-Golovina; Evdokiya Alexandrovna Gorbataya-Shuyskaya
- Issue: with Varvara: Anna Romanovna; Euphimia Romanovna with Evdokiya: Fyodor Nikitich Romanov; Marfa Romanovna; Lev Romanov; Mikhail Nikitich Romanov; Alexander Romanov; Nikifor Romanov; Ivan Nikitich Romanov; Uliana Romanovna; Irina Romanovna; Anastasiya Romanovna; Vasily Romanov
- House: Romanov
- Father: Roman Yurievich Zakharyin-Koshkin
- Mother: Uliana Feodorovna Karpova

Nikita Romanovich (Russian: Никита Романович; born c. 1522 – 23 April 1586), also known as Nikita Romanovich Zakharyin-Yuriev, was a prominent Russian boyar. His grandson Michael I (Tsar 1613–1645) founded the Romanov dynasty of Russian tsars.

== Biography ==
He was a son of the okolnichy Roman Yurievich Zakharyin (who died on 16 February 1543, and who gave his name to the Romanov dynasty of Russian monarchs), and of Roman Yurievich's wife Uliana Ivanovna, who died in 1579. Nikita Romanovich became the brother-in-law of Tsar Ivan IV of Russia (Ivan the Terrible), who married Nikita's sister Anastasia Romanovna in 1547. His great-grandfather was Zakhary Ivanovich Koshkin.

Nikita Romanovich first appears in the historical record in 1547, when, on the occasion of the Tsar's wedding with Anastasia Romanovna, he was promoted to spalnik and stolnik. He participated as a rynda (bodyguard) of the tsar in the unlucky campaigns against the Khanate of Kazan in 1547 and in 1548. Later he became the assistant to the Princes Vasily Serebryany and Andrey Nogtev-Suzdalsky with the rank of okolnichy in the Livonian campaign of 1559.

He was granted boyar status in 1562. Four years later, following the death of his brother Daniil Romanovich, he became the governor of Tver. He commanded detachments of the Russian army during the winter campaign of 1572 in Novgorod and against Sweden. He also took part in the Livonian campaigns of 1573 and 1577.

Before his death (March 1584) Ivan the Terrible left his two sons, Feodor and Dmitry, to the care of trusted associates. Until illness incapacitated him in late 1584, Nikita Romanovich, as the only uncle of Tsar Feodor I, led the regency. He died on 23 April 1586 and was buried in the Novospassky Monastery near Moscow.

== Marriages and issue ==
Nikita Romanovich married twice. His first wife, Varvara Ivanovna Khovrina-Golovina (d. 18 June 1556), was the daughter of the hereditary treasurer of Tsardom of Russia and a Rurikid princess. They had two daughters:

1. Anna (d. 1585), married to Prince Ivan Fyodorovich Troyekurov (d. 29 May 1621)
2. Euphimia (d. murdered 23 March 1602), married to Prince Ivan Vasilievich Sitski (d. Kozheozero Monastery, 23 March 1608)

Nikita Romanovich's second wife, Evdokiya Alexandrovna Gorbataya-Shuyskaya (d. 4 April 1581), another Rurikid princess from the Shuysky branch, was a sixth cousin of the future Vasili IV. By her, he had eleven children:

1. Fyodor Nikitich Romanov
2. Marfa (d. 1610), married to Prince Boris Keybulatovich Tcherkasskiy (d. 22 April 1601)
3. Lev (d. 1595)
4. Mikhail Nikitich Romanov (d. Nyrob, 18 March 1605), okolnichiy
5. Alexander (d. murdered in Usolie-Lud 15 March 1605), boyar (1599), married firstly to Princess Eudoxia Ivanovna Galitsyna (d. 1 August 1597) and secondly to Juliana Semyonovna Pogozhaya (d. 1622), without issue.
6. Nikifor (d. 1601)
7. Ivan "Kascha" (d. 1640), boyar (1605), married to Princess Uliana Fyodorovna Litvinova-Massalaskaya (d. 1650), and had issue:
  1. Nikita (c. 1607 – 21 December 1654), Boyar 1645
  2. Andrey (d. 25 April 1609)
  3. Dmitry (d. 4 November 1611)
  4. Irina (d. 10 September 1615)
  5. Praskovia (d. 25 October 1622)
  6. Ivan (d. 30 July 1625)
8. Uliana (d. 1565)
9. Irina (d. 6 June 1636), married in 1602 to Ivan Ivanovich Godunov (d. drowned 1610), okolnichiy (1603), second cousin of Boris Godunov, and had issue:
  1. Pyotr, Steward, who married and had issue:
    1. Grigory, Steward (1678), married to Marfa Afanasievna, without issue.
10. Anastasiya (d. 1655), married to Prince Boris Mikhailovich Lykov-Obolenskiy, one of the Seven Boyars of 1610
11. Vasily (d. Pelym, 15 February 1601)
