= Zakhary Ivanovich Koshkin =

Russian boyar (d. 1461)

Zakhary Ivanovich Koshkin (died 1461) was a boyar at the court of Vasili II. He was a male-line forefather of the Romanov family, and the first Romanov Tsar, Michael I of Russia, was his agnatic descendant.

Koshkin was the son of Ivan Fyodorovich Koshkin. He had several brothers: Yakov, Ivan, and Feodor. He was the great-grandfather of Anastasia Romanovna, the first wife of Ivan the terrible, and a progenitor of the Romanov dynasty. The first Romanov Tsar of Russia, Michael I, was a male-line descendant of Zakhary.

== Progeny ==
Koshkin had three sons of his own: Yakov Zakharyevich, Yuri Zakharyevich, and Vasily Zakharyevich. Among them, Yuri Zakharyevich Koshkin was the father of Roman Yurievich Zakharyin. It is from the first name of the latter that the future royal family derives its surname, Romanov. Roman Yurievich Zakharyin was the father of Nikita Romanovich Zakharyin-Yuriev, who in turn was the paternal grandfather of Tsar Michael I.
Thus, the lineage is:

- Zakhary Ivanovich Koshkin
  - Yakov Zakharyevich
  - Yuri Zakharyevich
    - Roman Yurievich Zakharyin
      - Tsarina Anastasia Romanovna, first wife of Ivan the terrible
      - Nikita Romanovich Zakharyin-Yuriev, regent for his nephew Feodor I, last Rurikid Tsar of Russia
        - Feodor Nikitich Romanov, Patriarch of Moscow
          - Tsar Michael I of Russia, first Romanov Tsar of Russia
  - Vasily Zakharyevich.
