= Anastasia Romanovna =

Tsaritsa of Russia from 1547 to 1560

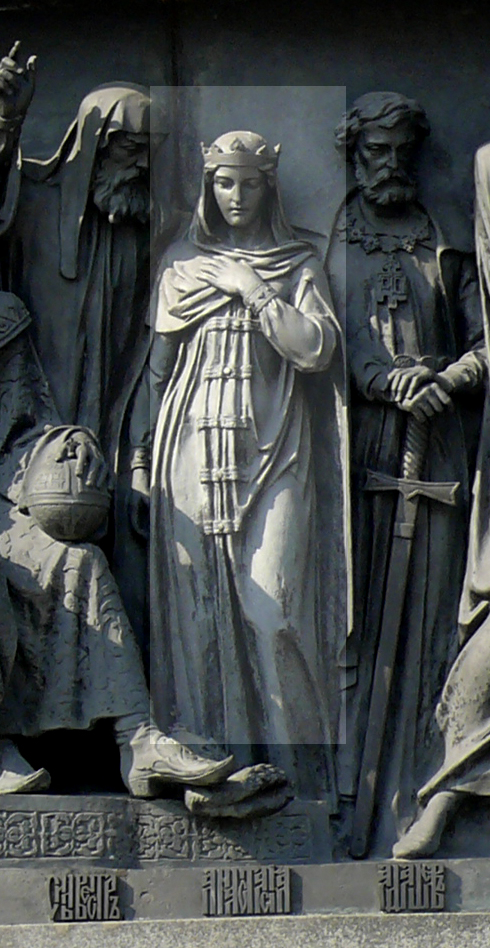
- Anastasia Romanovna on the Millennium of Russia monument in Veliky Novgorod

Tsaritsa consort of all Russia
- Tenure: 3 February 1547 – 7 August 1560
- Born: 1530
- Died: 7 August 1560 (aged 29–30); Kolomenskoye
- Burial: Ascension Convent, Kolomenskoye; Archangel Cathedral, Kremlin (1929)
- Spouse: Ivan IV of Russia (m. 1547)
- Issue: Anna; Mariya; Dmitry; Ivan; Yevdokia; Feodor I
- House: Romanov (by birth); Rurik (by marriage)
- Father: Roman Yurievich Zakharyin-Koshkin
- Mother: Juliana Feodorovna Karpova

Anastasia Romanovna Zakharyina-Yurieva (Russian: Анастасия Романовна Захарьина-Юрьева; 1530 – 7 August 1560) was the tsaritsa of all Russia as the first wife of Ivan IV, the tsar of all Russia. She was also the mother of Feodor I, the last lineal Rurikid tsar of Russia, (Note: Vasily IV is often named to be the last Rurikid tsar of Russia, however he was member of House of Shuysky, cadet branch of Rurik dynasty, so it makes Feodor I the last full-fledged Rurikid tsar of Russia.) and the great-aunt of Michael of Russia, the first tsar of the Romanov dynasty.

== Early life and ancestry ==
Anastasia was the daughter of the boyar Roman Yurievich Zakharyin-Koshkin, who served as Okolnichy during the reign of Grand Prince Vasily III. The House of Zakharyin-Yuriev was a minor branch of a Russian noble family that had already been at court. Ivan had met Anastasia before the bride show as her uncle had been one of Ivan's guardians. Anastasia's father was descended from the boyar Feodor "Koshka" ("Cat") Kobyla, fourth son of Andrei Kobyla.

Her mother was Juliana Fedorovna Karpova, daughter of Russian Boyar, publicist and diplomat Fedor Ivanovich Karpov (d. 1540), whose family descended from Princes Fominsky, scions of the Rostislavichi branch of the Rurik dynasty.

Anastasia had at least three older siblings – Daniel, Nikita and Anna. Both girls spent most of their childhood and early youth with their mother, and had the traditional upbringing of noblewomen of their rank. Roman Yurievich Zakharyin-Koshkin died on 16 February 1543.

== Marriage ==
Anastasia was selected as the best bride for Ivan from a large number of suitable mates brought to the Kremlin specifically for the selection process. All the noble families throughout Russia were given an invitation to present their eligible daughters for this purpose (it is said that there were between 500 and 1,500 girls to choose from). Anastasia and Ivan's marriage took place on 3 February 1547, at the Cathedral of the Annunciation. She gave birth to a total of six children: Anna, Maria, Dmitry, Ivan, Eudoxia, and Feodor.

It is widely believed that Anastasia had a moderating influence on Ivan's volatile character. Ivan adored Anastasia and never thought to be with any woman but her. Anastasia was beautiful, with lovely eyes and soft face with a calming influence. She often spoke in a tender voice and was very polite. The Tsar himself, in his later years after he chaotically and unhappily married five times following Anastasia's death, said that if she had not died, none of the gruesome things he did would have happened. After Anastasia's death, the Tsar's personality changed completely. Sir Jerome Horsey, an agent for the Russia Company and envoy for the English court, wrote in his memoirs about Anastasia and Ivan IV: "He being young and riotous, she ruled him with admirable affability and wisdom". In the summer of 1560, Anastasia fell ill to a lingering illness and died on 7 August. In consequence, Ivan suffered a severe emotional collapse, suspecting that his wife had been a victim of malicious actions and had been poisoned by the boyars. Although he had no evidence of such crimes, he had a number of boyars tortured and executed. Ivan already had a strong dislike of the boyars due to their abusive actions toward him during his childhood. In response to her death, he developed a corps of fearsome black-clad men who terrorized on his behalf, known as the oprichniki.

The examination of Anastasia's remains in the 1990s and at the beginning of the 21st century by archaeologists and forensics experts provided evidence that could sustain her husband's claim. Further research using neutron activation analysis confirmed the acute mercury poisoning of Anastasia. While mercury was also used as a cure, leading to some debate around the issue, the levels of mercury found were too high, according to the experts. However, many of the royal remains have high levels of poison in them, suggesting that possibly Anastasia was not maliciously poisoned, but died of medical treatment that used poisonous substances.

== Children ==
- Tsarevna Anna Ivanovna of Russia (10 August 1549 – 20 July 1550)
- Tsarevna Maria Ivanovna of Russia (17 March 1551 – ?); died young.
- Tsarevich Dmitry Ivanovich of Russia (October 1552 – 26 June 1553)
- Tsarevich Ivan Ivanovich of Russia (28 March 1554 – 19 November 1581); heir of Ivan IV, murdered by his father.
- Tsarevna Eudoxia Ivanovna of Russia (26 February 1556 – June 1558)
- Tsar Feodor I of Russia (31 May 1557 – 6 January 1598); Ivan IV's successor.

== Legacy ==
Through her marriage to Ivan IV, Anastasia became the link between the two main ruling dynasties in Russian history, the Rurik dynasty and the Romanov dynasty.

Anastasia's brother, Nikita Romanovich, was the father of Feodor Romanov, the first to take the surname Romanov, in honour of his grandfather, father of a tsaritsa. In other words, Feodor Romanov was the first cousin of the last Rurikid tsar, Feodor I. This connection with the derelict dynasty facilitated the election of Feodor's son Mikhail Romanov to the throne after the Time of Troubles.

On 20 August 2010, the Head of the Russian Imperial House, H.I.H. Grand Duchess Maria Vladimirovna of Russia, established the Imperial Order of the Holy Great Martyr Anastasia for women. The Order was established in honor of the Holy Great Martyr Saint Anastasia and in memory of Tsaritsa Anastasia Romanovna. The Order of the Holy Great Martyr Anastasia is granted to women who have distinguished themselves in the areas of charity, culture, medicine, education, science, and other endeavors useful to the nation and society, and who now continue their noble deeds under the patronage of the Head of the Russian Imperial House.

== In popular culture ==
Anastasia is one of the main characters in the ballet Ivan the Terrible by choreographer Yuri Grigorovich with music by Sergei Prokofiev, which premiered on 20 February 1975, at the Bolshoi Theatre, starring Yuri Vladimirov as Ivan IV and Natalia Bessmertnova as Anastasia. The ballet's plot includes the meeting and marriage of Anastasia and Ivan, her poisoning by boyars, and Ivan's fall into darkness and madness after the loss of Anastasia. The ballet has had several revivals.

In Sergei Eisenstein's 1945 film Ivan the Terrible, she was portrayed by Lyudmila Tselikovskaya.

In a 2020 Russian TV series called The Terrible (ru), Anastasia Romanovna is portrayed by Tatyana Lyalina.

== Notes ==
Anastasia Romanovna Romanov Born: 1530 Died: 7 August 1560
Russian royalty
Vacant Title last held by Elena Glinskaya as Grand Princess of Moscow	Tsaritsa of all Russia; 1547–1560	Vacant Title next held by Maria Temryukovna
