= The Romanovs Collect: European Art from the Hermitage (exhibition) =

2003 exhibition of art from the Hermitage Museum

The Romanovs Collect: European Art from the Hermitage was an art exhibition at the University of Michigan Museum of Art (UMMA), on display from September 21 to November 23, 2003. It was part of the festival "Celebrating St. Petersburg: 300 Years of Cultural Brilliance."

== Background ==
The traveling exhibition included 142 objects from the Hermitage Museum in Saint Petersburg, Russia. UMMA was the only North American venue to host it, and a team of curators from the Hermitage traveled to Ann Arbor for the duration of the show. It was the first large-scale partnership between the Hermitage and a North American university museum, and negotiations took about three years to complete. The exhibition was sponsored by the Ford Motor Company. James Christen Steward (a professor of art history) was UMMA's director at the time.

== Description ==
The exhibition was organized chronologically by the Romanov tsars who collected the pieces, all the way from the founding of St. Petersburg in 1703 through the Bolshevik Revolution of 1917. A large percentage of pieces were collected by Catherine the Great. It also included seven pieces collected by Nicholas II, the last Romanov tsar.

Steward said of the exhibition, "The uneasy tension within the royal family grew out of a desire to be of their time and acknowledgment of democratic values amidst a fundamental distrust of the people. Nonetheless, this exhibit seeks to humanize a complex and tragic family history."

== Art and objects on display ==
The show included 142 objects, by approximately 80 different European (including French, English, Dutch, and German) artists and artisans. It include paintings, sculptures, ceramics, porcelain, tapestry, and furniture.

Each piece included was accompanied by a label explaining the lineage of the piece, including information about who acquired it and often some context about his or her reign.

Notable pieces included:

=== Decorative art ===
- Elizabeth of Russia's Meissen porcelain tureen with the Order of St. Andrew
- a Meissen candlestick, cup and saucer, plate and sauce boat
- an album of allegorical prints by Marten Heemskerk
- furniture by David Roentgen
- pieces from the "Cameo" dinner and dessert service made for Catherine the Great by the royal Sèvres Porcelain Factory
- a jeweled cane
- cream vases with covers by Josiah Wedgewood

=== Paintings ===
- Moonrise by Caspar David Friedrich (circa 1835)
- Ancient Ruins Serving as a Public Bath by Hubert Robert (1796)
- Allegory of Spring by Hans Bol
- Portrait of a Young Man in a Hat by Jean-Baptiste Greuze
- Annunciation by Anton Raphael Mengs
- a painting of ships (acquired by Tsar Peter)
- Entrée du port de Palerme au clair de lune by Joseph Vernet

=== Sculptures ===
- three 17th-century Roman sculptures
