= Feodor Koshka =

Russian boyar (died 1407)

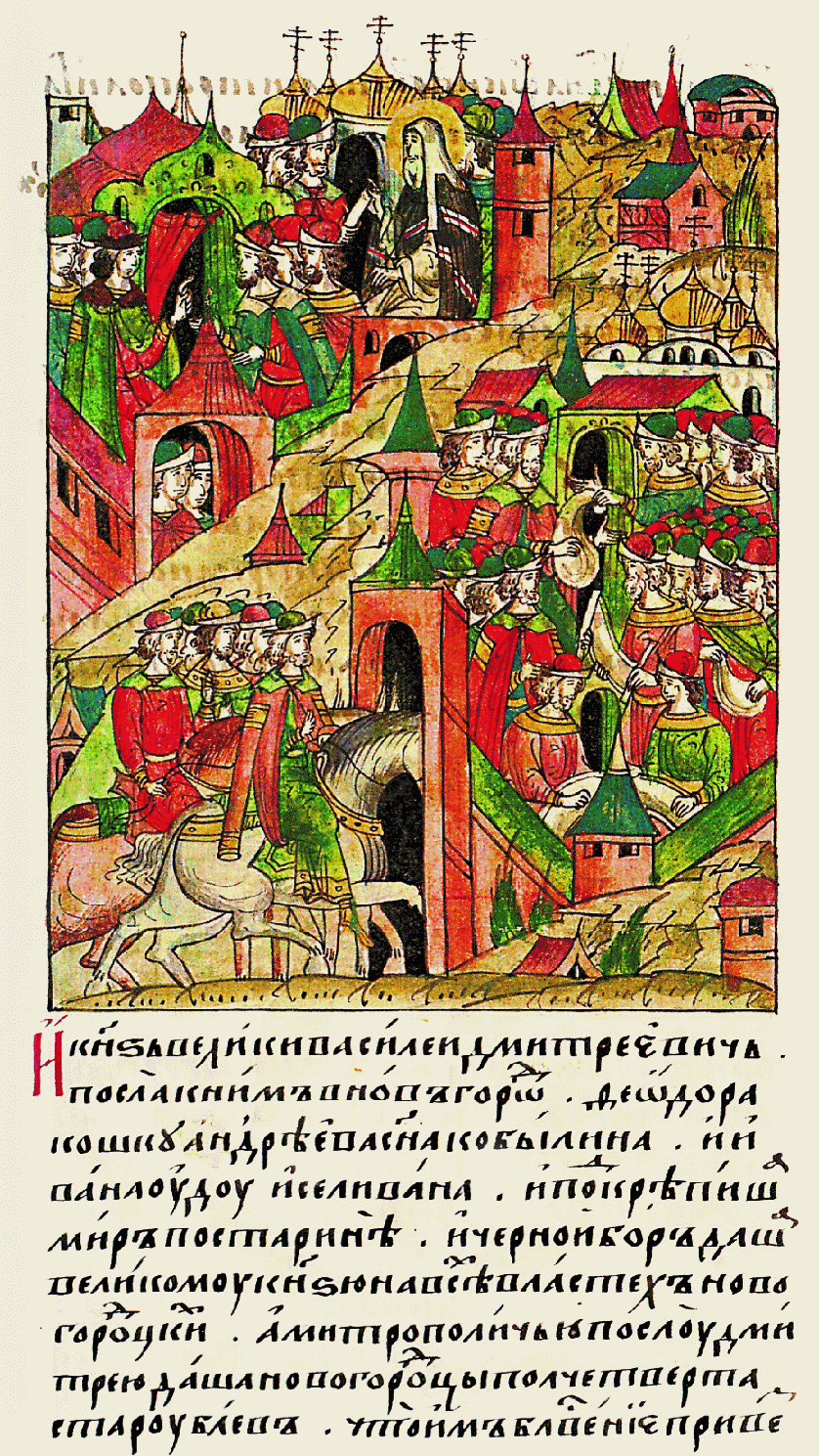
- Died: 1407
- Noble family: House of Romanov
- Issue: Ivan Fyodorovich Koshkin; Fedor Fedorovich Koshkin; Alexander Fyodorovich Koshkin; Anna Fyodorovna Koshkina; Akulina Fyodorovna Koshkina; Maria Fyodorovna Koshkina
- Father: Andrei Ivanovich Kobyla

Feodor or Fyodor Andreyevich Koshka (Note: As a matter of fact, cats in Russia were highly valued and loved for their beauty, as well as for the ability to preserve one of the main treasures of the Russian people — bread. At the same time, while hunting rodents cats not only kept barns intact but also thereby obtained food for themselves. The price of the [good] mouse-hunting cat was higher than the price of cattle and some [people] had to pay as much silver as the domestic predator's weight. Not surprisingly, periodically the cats had been awarded for special merits or [people] had been given the nickname "Cat".) (Russian: Фёдор Андре́евич Кошка; died 1407) was a Russian boyar. He was the youngest son of Andrei Ivanovich Kobyla and the progenitor of the Romanov dynasty and the Sheremetev family.

== Life ==
He was a senior boyar in the duma of Dmitry and his son Vasily I. According to some sources, Koshka governed Moscow during Dmitry's absence in the Battle of Kulikovo. In 1393, he was recorded as negotiating with Novgorod for peace.

His cautious approach towards the Tatars was praised by Edigu in his 1407 letter to Vasili I. It is believed that Fyodor died about that date. His daughters Anna and Akulina married the prince of Rostov and the prince of Mikulin, respectively, while his granddaughter Maria married Yaroslav of Borovsk, father-in-law of Vasily II. He had three sons: Ivan, Fyodor, and Alexander.
