= Tsarevich Dmitry Ivanovich of Russia (1552–1553) =

Dmitri Ivanovich
- Tsarevich of Russia
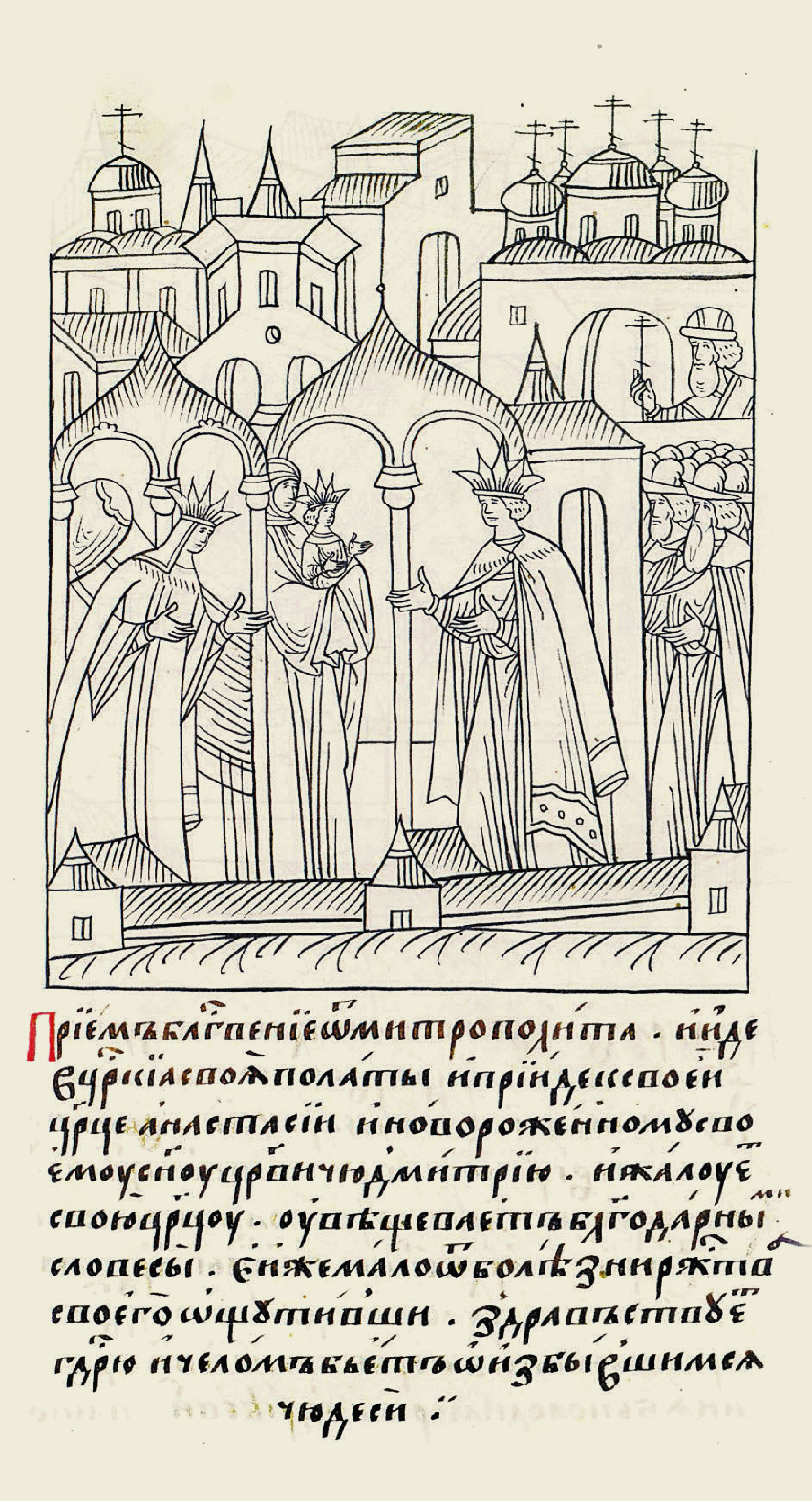
- Born: 11 October 1552; Moscow, Russia
- Died: 26 June 1553 (aged 8 months 15 days)
- Burial: Archangel Cathedral, Moscow
- Dynasty: Rurik
- Father: Ivan IV of Russia
- Mother: Anastasia Romanovna

Dmitry Ivanovich (Russian: Дмитрий Иванович; 11 October [O.S. 1 October] 1552 – 26 June [O.S. 16 June] 1553) was the eldest son of Ivan the Terrible, the Tsar of all Russia, and as such the first Tsarevich (heir apparent). He died in infancy.

== Early life ==
Dmitry was born as the third child and first son of Ivan IV of Russia ("the Terrible") by his first wife, Anastasia Romanovna. Throughout the first four years of their marriage, Anastasia presented Ivan with two daughters, Anna and Maria. Both died in infancy, Anna at the age of eleven months and Maria before her sixth month. However, on 11 October 1552, Anastasia gave birth to a son, Dmitry.

During a severe illness, Ivan asked the boyars to take an oath, making his infant son his heir apparent and the first Tsarevich. However, the boyars were not satisfied, as they wanted to see Ivan's cousin, Vladimir of Staritsa, succeed, but they reluctantly accepted. Historians cannot agree whether this episode occurred in 1552, or 1553.

== Death ==
In the summer of 1553, Ivan proposed a pilgrimage to Kirillo-Belozersky Monastery, near the present-day village of Kirillov. While on the Sora River, the royal boat was hit by a wave, it overturned, and the Tsesarevich was dropped by his wet nurse. The adults managed to escape, but by the time they got to the baby, Dmitry had drowned. A chronicle records that Maximus the Greek, who had recently visited Ivan, allegedly foresaw the death of the Tsesarevich. According to Andrey Kurbsky, Maximus had told Ivan that "he should not go such a long way with his wife and newborn lad".

Dmitry was interred in the Archangel Cathedral. After his death, Anastasia Romanovna would have three more children, two of whom would survive infancy. Ivan's youngest son by his last wife was named Dmitry, after his eldest son, who had died more than 30 years earlier.

Tsarevich Dmitry Ivanovich of Russia (1552–1553) Rurik dynasty Born: 11 October 1552 Died: 26 June 1553
Russian royalty
Preceded by Yuri Vasilievich	Heir to the Russian throne as heir apparent early 1553 – 26 June 1553	Succeeded by Yuri Vasilievich
