= Andrei Kobyla =

Earliest known ancestor of the Romanov dynasty

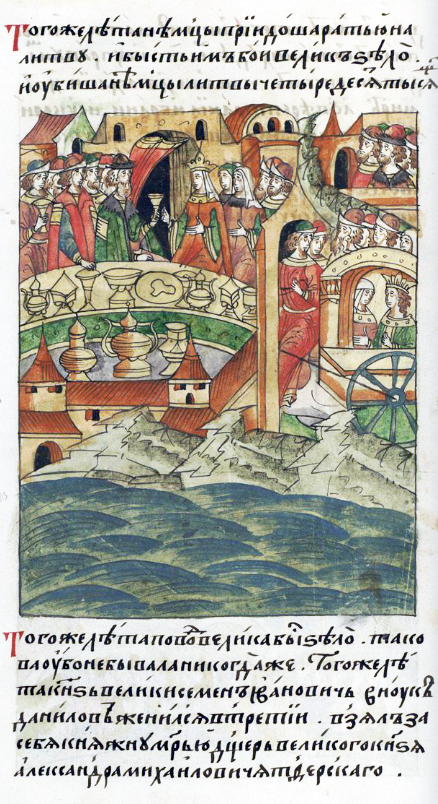

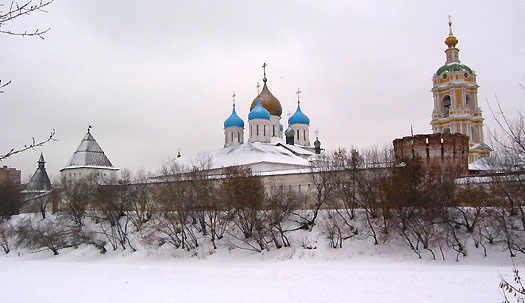
Novospassky Monastery where many of Kobyla's male-line descendants have been buried.

Andrei Ivanovich Kobyla (Russian: Андрей Иванович Кобыла; died after 1347) was a boyar in the court of Grand Prince Simeon of Moscow. He is the progenitor and earliest documented member of the Imperial Russian House of Romanov.

== Biography ==
Andrei Kobyla is documented in contemporary Russian chronicles only once, in 1347, when he was dispatched on a mission by Simeon of Moscow to Tver, with the purpose of meeting Simeon's bride, who was a daughter of Aleksandr Mikhailovich of Tver.

Neither Andrei's pedigree nor his exact position and influence in Simeon's court are known, hence speculation abounds.

Later generations assigned to Kobyla the most illustrious pedigrees. They first claimed that he had arrived in Moscow in 1341 from Prussia, where his father, Glanda Kambila, was a Prussian holdout against the conquest of Balts by the Teutonic knights.

In the late 17th century, after the Romanovs' elevation to Russia's ruling dynasty, this origin story was replaced by a more grandiose lineage, giving Andrei Kobyla's descent from Julius Caesar. Sixteenth-century genealogies mention five of Andrei's sons: Simeon Zherebets, Alexander Yolka, Vasily Vantey, Gavrila Gavsha and Fyodor Koshka.
