= House of Romanov =

Imperial dynasty of Russia (1613–1917)

House of Romanov Романовы
- Imperial house
- Argent, a griffin gules, holding in its right paw a sword, in the left an oval buckler or, on it an eagle displayed sable; the whole within a bordure of the last charged with eight lion's heads erased, alternately of the first and the third.
- Parent house: Schleswig-Holstein-Gottorp (since 1762) (Note: The Romanov descendants of Peter III descend in the male line from the House of Holstein-Gottorp, a cadet branch of the House of Oldenburg.)
- Country: List: Russian Empire; Tsardom of Russia; Congress Kingdom of Poland; Grand Duchy of Lithuania; Grand Duchy of Finland; Grand Duchy of Oldenburg; Duchy of Courland and Semigallia; Duchy of Holstein; Order of Malta
- Founded: 21 February 1613; 413 years ago
- Founder: Michael I
- Current head: Grand Duchess Maria Vladimirovna of Russia (great-great-granddaughter of Alexander II of Russia); Prince Alexis Romanoff, (great-great-grandson of Alexander III of Russia); Prince Karl Emich of Leiningen, under the regnal name Nicholas III (great-great-great-grandson of Alexander II of Russia)
- Final ruler: Elizabeth I (agnatic line); Nicholas II (cognatic line)
- Titles: Tsar of all Russia (1613–1721); Emperor of all Russia (1721–1917); Other titles...
- Dissolution: 1762; 264 years ago (in agnatic line after death of Elizabeth I)
- Deposition: 15 March 1917; 109 years ago (February Revolution)
- Cadet branches: See list

The House of Romanov (Note: Pronunciation: /ˈroʊmənɒf/, US also /ˈroʊmənɔːf, -nɔːv, roʊˈmɑːnəf/, UK also /roʊˈmɑːnɒf/; Russian: [rɐˈmanəf].) (also transliterated as Romanoff; Russian: Романовы, romanized: Romanovy, IPA: [rɐˈmanəvɨ]) was a royal house and the reigning imperial house of Tsarist Russia from 1613 until its deposition in 1917. They achieved prominence after Anastasia Romanovna married Ivan the Terrible, the first crowned tsar of all Russia. Nicholas II, the last Emperor of Russia, and his immediate family were executed in 1918, but there are still living descendants of other members of the imperial house.

The house consisted of boyars in Russia (the highest rank in the Russian nobility at the time) under the reigning Rurik dynasty, which became extinct upon the death of Feodor I in 1598. The Time of Troubles, caused by the resulting succession crisis, saw several pretenders and impostors lay claim to the Russian throne during the Polish–Lithuanian occupation. On 21 February 1613, the Zemsky Sobor elected Michael Romanov as tsar, establishing the Romanovs as Russia's second reigning dynasty.

Michael's grandson, Peter I, who took the title of emperor and proclaimed the Russian Empire in 1721, transformed the country into a great power through a series of wars and reforms. The direct male line of the Romanovs ended when Elizabeth died childless in 1762. As a result, her nephew Peter III, an agnatic member of the House of Holstein-Gottorp (a cadet branch of the German House of Oldenburg), ascended to the throne and adopted his Romanov mother's house name. Officially known as members of the House of Romanov, descendants after Elizabeth are sometimes referred to as Holstein-Gottorp-Romanov.

Paul I became the first heir to the throne, having the title tsesarevich, which was subsequently used for all main heirs.

The abdication of Nicholas II on 15 March [O.S. 2 March] 1917 as a result of the February Revolution ended 304 years of Romanov rule and led to the establishment of the Russian Republic under the Russian Provisional Government in the lead-up to the Russian Civil War of 1917–1922. In 1918, the Bolsheviks executed Nicholas II and his family. Of the House of Romanov's 65 members, 47 survivors went into exile abroad. In 1924, Grand Duke Kirill Vladimirovich, the senior surviving male-line descendant of Alexander II of Russia by primogeniture, claimed the headship of the defunct Imperial House of Russia.

== Surname usage ==
Legally, it remains unclear whether any ukase ever abolished the surname of Michael Romanov (or of his subsequent male-line descendants) after his accession to the Russian throne in 1613, although by tradition members of reigning dynasties seldom use surnames, being known instead by dynastic titles ("Tsarevich Ivan Alexeevich", "Grand Duke Nikolai Nikolaevich", etc.). From January 1762 [O.S. December 1761], the monarchs of the Russian Empire claimed the throne as relatives of Grand Duchess Anna Petrovna of Russia (1708–1728), who had married Charles Frederick, Duke of Holstein-Gottorp. Thus they were no longer Romanovs by patrilineage, belonging instead to the Holstein-Gottorp cadet branch of the German House of Oldenburg that reigned in Denmark. The 1944 edition of the Almanach de Gotha records the name of Russia's ruling dynasty from the time of Peter III (reigned 1761–1762) as "Holstein-Gottorp-Romanov". However, the terms "Romanov" and "House of Romanov" often occurred in official references to the Russian imperial family. The coat-of-arms of the Romanov boyars was included in legislation on the imperial dynasty, and in a 1913 jubilee, Russia officially celebrated the "300th Anniversary of the Romanovs' rule".

After the February Revolution of 1917, a special decree of the Provisional Government of Russia granted all members of the imperial family the surname "Romanov". The only exceptions, the morganatic descendants of the Grand Duke Dmitri Pavlovich (1891–1942), took (in exile) the surname Ilyinsky.

== History ==
=== Origins ===
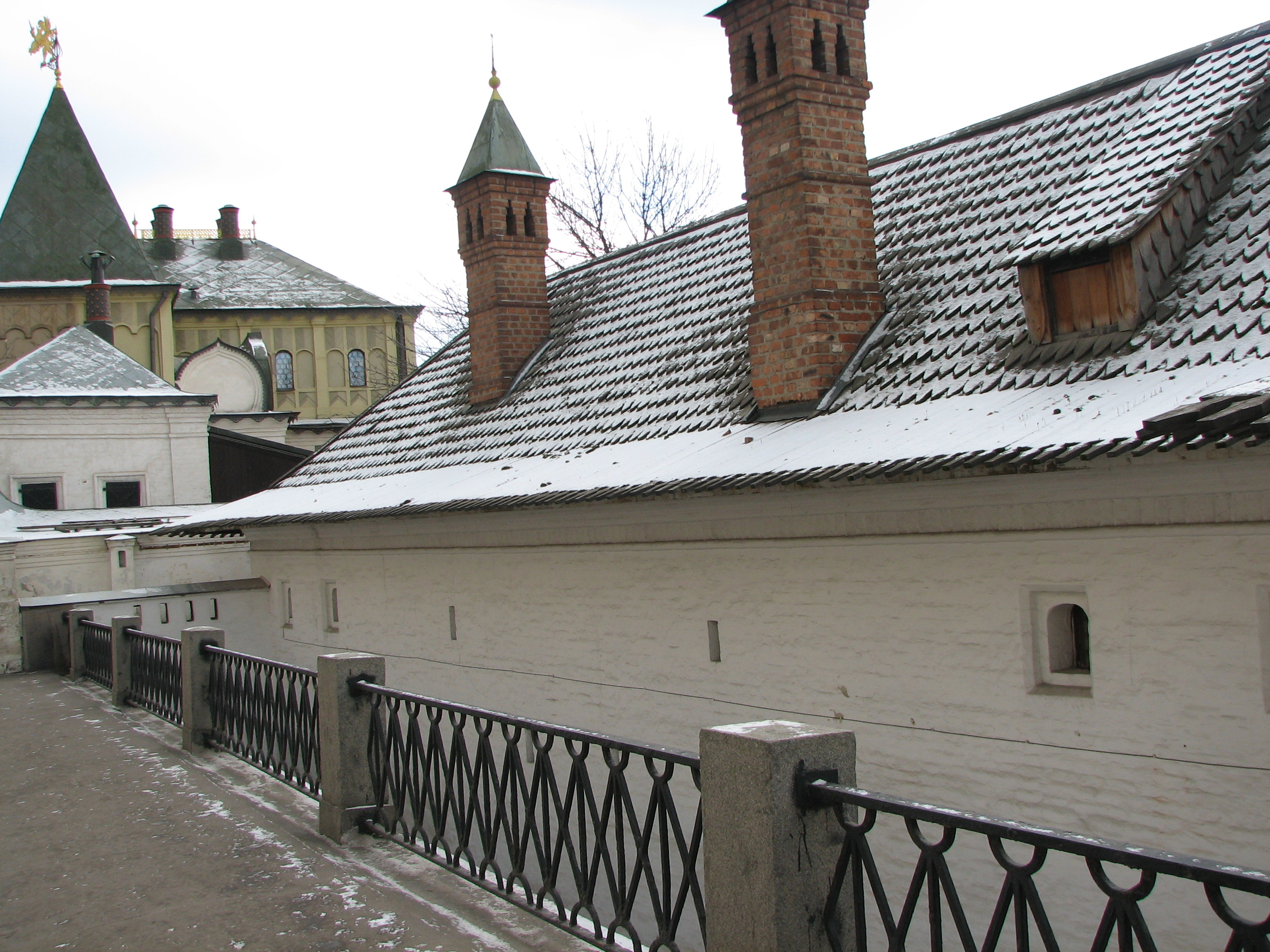
A 16th-century residence of the Yuryev-Zakharyin boyars in Zaryadye, near the Kremlin

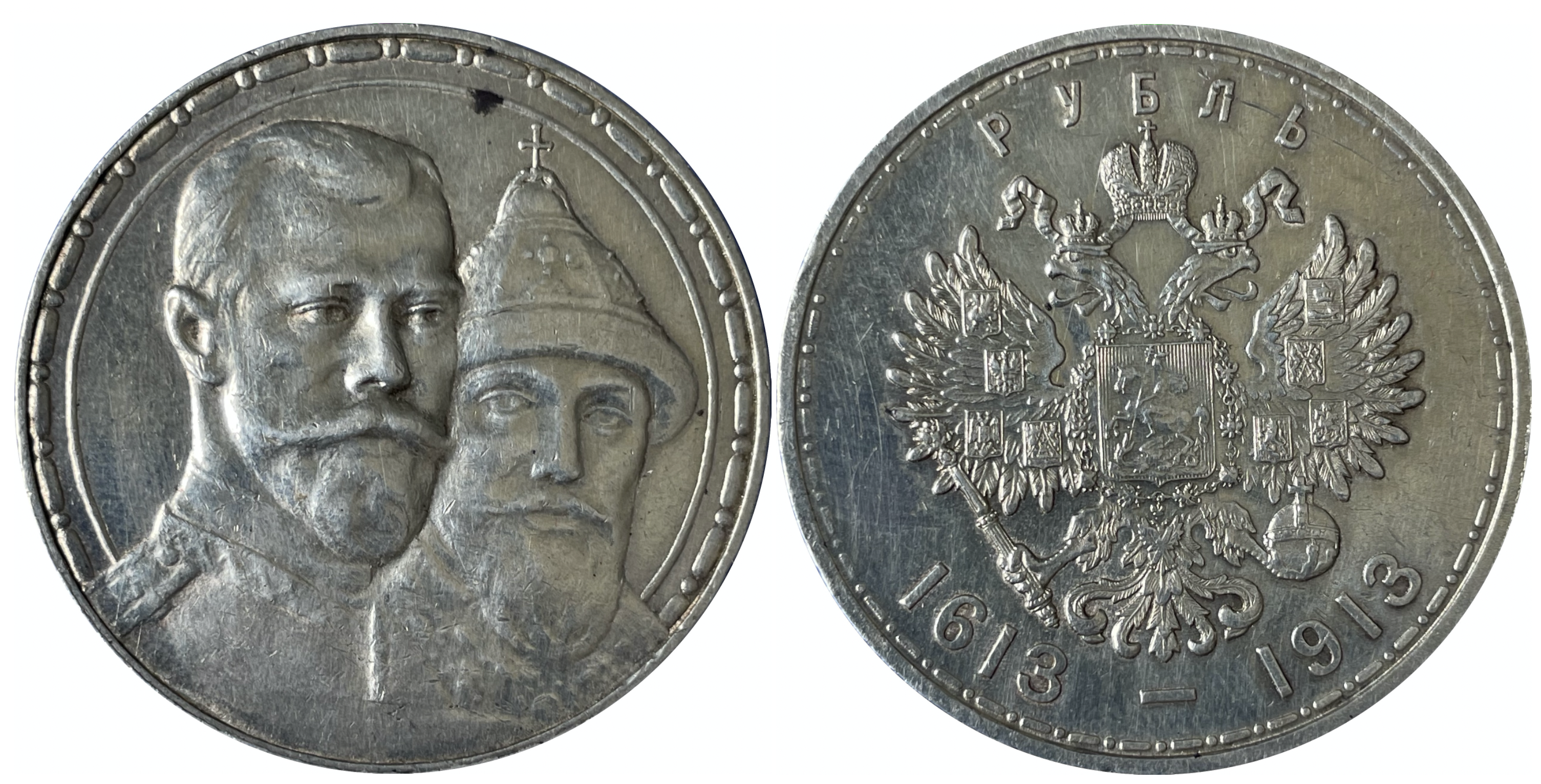
Silver coin: 1 ruble with the picture of Nikolai II – 1913 – On the obverse of the coin features two rulers: left Emperor Nikolas II in military uniform of the life guards of the 4th infantry regiment of the Imperial family, right Michael I in royal robes and Monomakh's Cap. Portraits made in a circular frame around of a Greek ornament.

The Romanovs share their origin with two dozen other Russian noble families. Their earliest common ancestor is one Andrei Kobyla, attested around 1347 as a boyar in the service of Simeon, the prince of Moscow and grand prince of Vladimir. Later generations assigned to Kobyla an illustrious pedigree. An 18th-century genealogy claimed that he was the son of the Old Prussian prince Glanda Kambila, who came to Russia in the second half of the 13th century, fleeing the invading Germans. Indeed, one of the leaders of the Old Prussian rebellion of 1260–1274 against the Teutonic order was named Glande. This legendary version of the Romanov's origin is contested by another version of descent from a boyar family from Novgorod.

One of Kobyla's sons, Feodor, a member of the boyar duma of Dmitry Donskoy, was nicknamed Koshka ("cat"). His descendants took the surname Koshkin, then changed it to Zakharin (descendants of Zakhary), which later split into two branches: Zakharin-Yakovlev (descendants of Yakov Zakharyevich) and Zakharin-Yuriev (descendants of Yuri Zakharyevich). During the reign of Ivan the Terrible, the former became known as Yakovlev (Alexander Herzen among them), whereas the grandchildren of Roman Yurievich Zakharyin-Yuriev changed their name to "Romanov".

Feodor Nikitich Romanov was descended from the Rurik dynasty through the female line. His mother, Evdokiya Gorbataya-Shuyskaya, was a Rurikid princess from the Shuysky branch, daughter of Alexander Gorbatyi-Shuisky. A ninth generation ancestor of Michael I Romanov is Dimitri Konstantinovich.

=== Rise to power ===
The family fortunes soared when Roman's daughter, Anastasia Zakharyina, married Ivan IV ("the Terrible") on 3 (13) February 1547. Since her husband had assumed the title of Tsar of all Russia, which derives from the title "Caesar", on 16 January 1547, she was crowned as the first tsaritsa of Russia. Her mysterious death in 1560 changed Ivan's character for the worse. Suspecting the boyars of having poisoned his beloved, Ivan launched a reign of terror against them. Among his children by Anastasia, the eldest, Ivan, was murdered by the tsar in a quarrel; the younger Feodor, a pious but lethargic prince, inherited the throne upon his father's death in 1584.

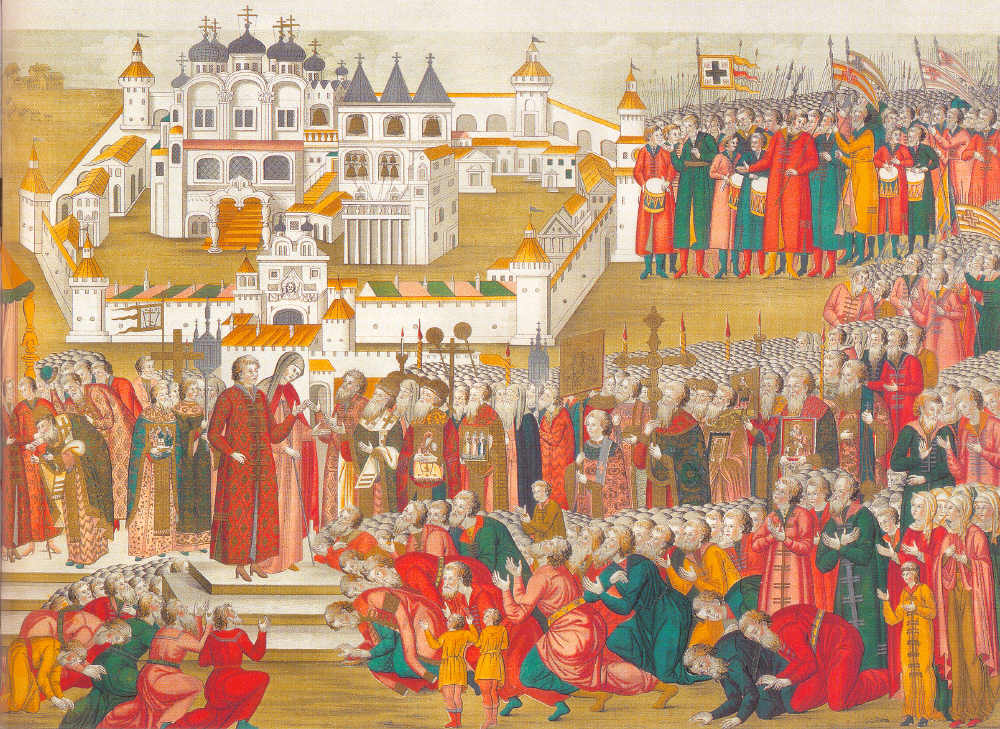
A crowd at the Ipatiev Monastery imploring Mikhail Romanov's mother to let him go to Moscow and become their tsar (illumination from a book dated 1673)

Throughout Feodor's reign (1584–1598), the tsar's brother-in-law, Boris Godunov, and his Romanov cousins contested the de facto rule of Russia. Upon the childless death of Feodor, the 700-year-old line of the Rurik dynasty came to an end, ushering in the Time of Troubles. After a long struggle, the party of Boris Godunov prevailed over the Romanovs, and the Zemsky Sobor elected Godunov as tsar in 1598. After a brief period of peace, in 1600 Godunov accused Feodor Nikitich Romanov, the family's leader, and his brothers of treason and witchcraft. Godunov's revenge on the Romanovs led to all the family and its relations being deported to remote corners of the Russian North and Urals, where most of them died of hunger or in chains. Feodor was exiled to the Antoniev Siysky Monastery and forced to take monastic vows with the name Filaret, while three of his brothers died, possibly assassinated by order of the tsar.

The Romanovs' fortunes again changed dramatically with the fall of the Godunov dynasty in June 1605. As a former leader of the anti-Godunov party and cousin of the last legitimate tsar, Filaret Romanov's recognition was sought by several impostors who attempted to claim the Rurikid legacy and throne during the Time of Troubles. False Dmitriy I made him a metropolitan of Rostov-on-Don, and False Dmitriy II raised him to the dignity of patriarch. His brother Ivan Romanov took part in the overthrow of Vasili IV of Russia. Upon the expulsion of the Polish army from Moscow in 1612, the Zemsky Sobor offered the Russian crown to several Rurikid and Gediminian princes, but all declined the honour. In the end, Filaret's 16-year-old son Mikhail Romanov, was chosen as a compromise candidate between the cossacks and the nobility, and was acclaimed tsar on 13 February 1613.

On being offered the Russian crown Mikhail, then living at the Ipatiev Monastery of Kostroma, burst into tears of fear and despair. He was finally persuaded to accept the throne by the delegation sent by the Zemsky Sobor, and was crowned on 11 July. Feeling how insecure his throne was, Mikhail attempted to emphasize his ties with the last Rurikid tsars and to reestablish the sacrality of the monarchy, and sought advice from the Zemsky Sobor and the boyars on every important issue. This strategy proved successful.

=== Dynastic crises and Peter the Great ===
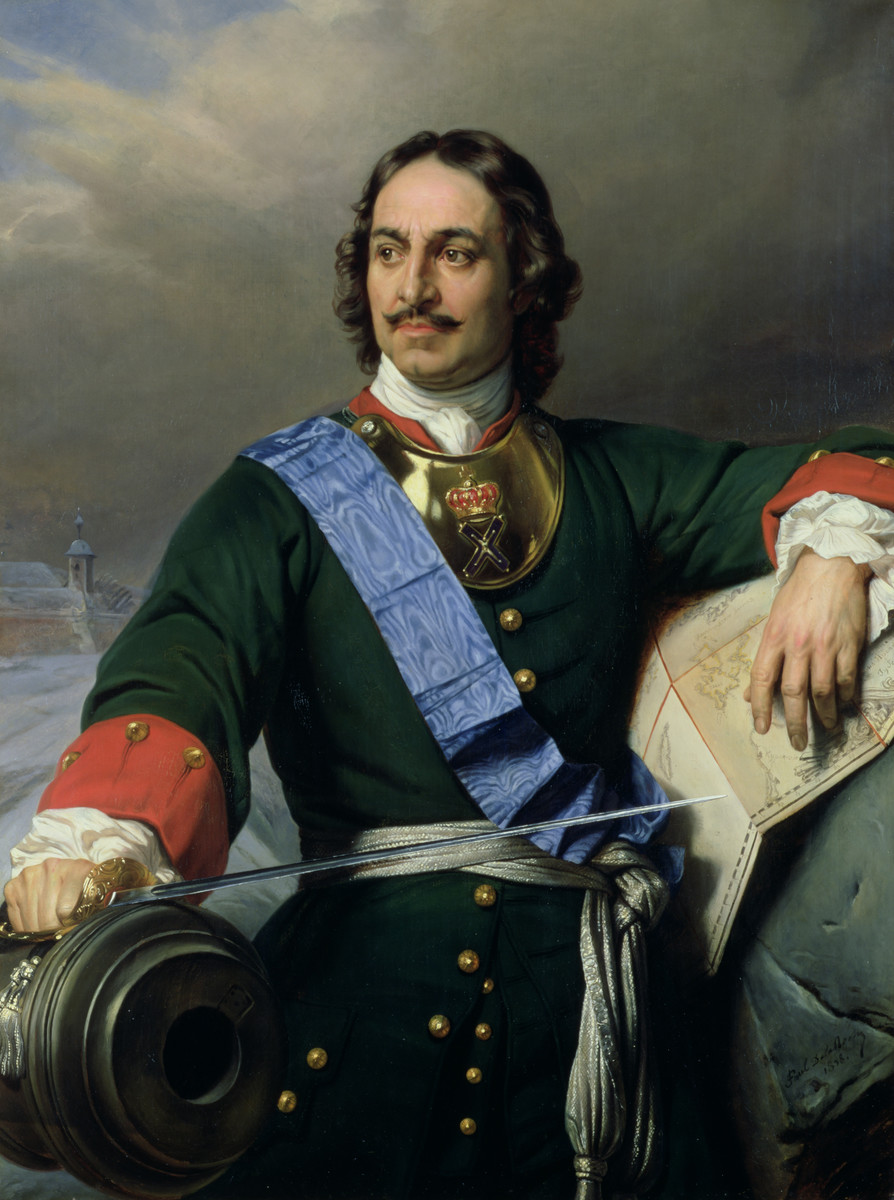
Peter the Great (1672–1725)

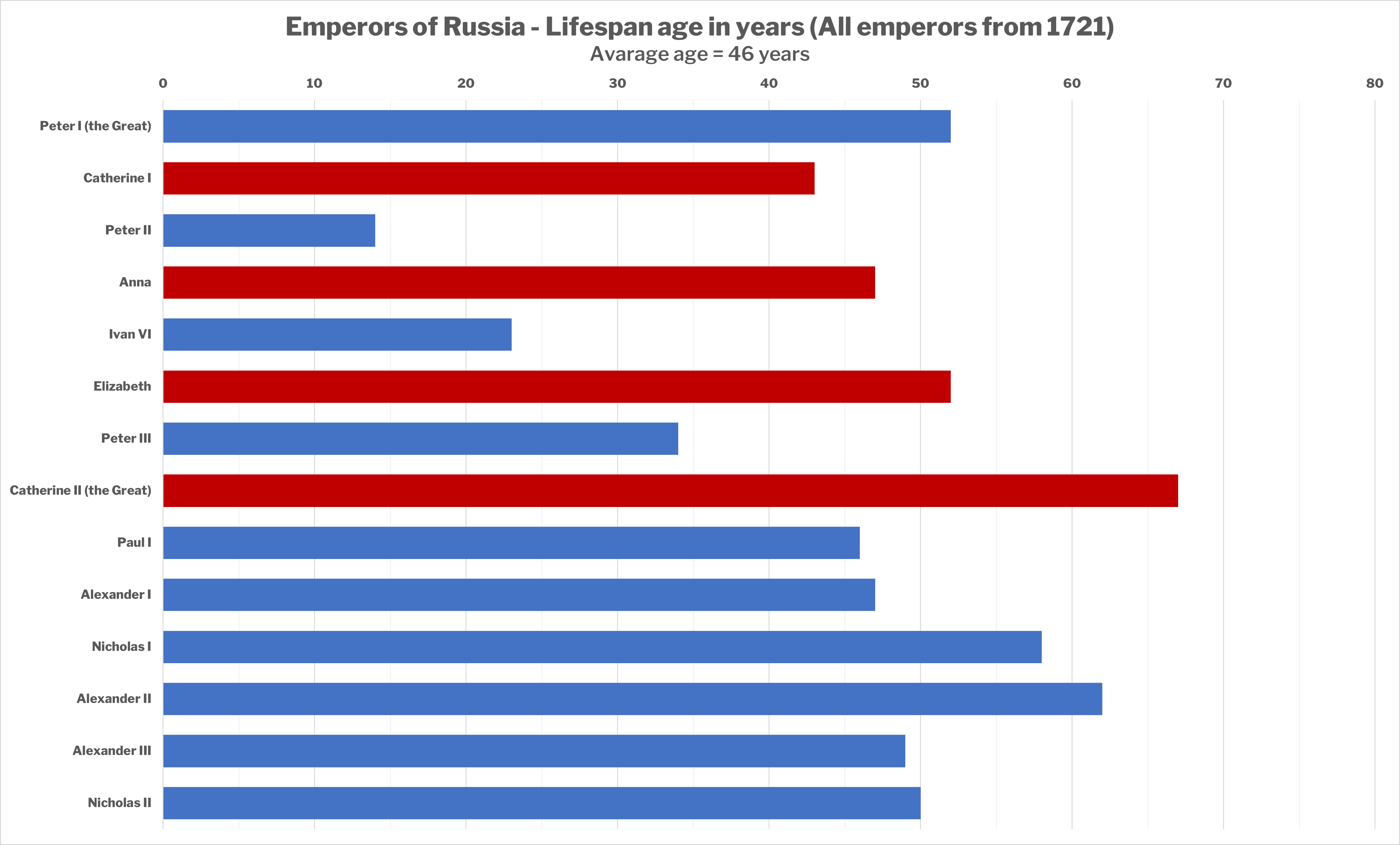
Lifespan of all the Russian emperors (1721–1918). The House of Romanov was noted for its succession of short-lived royals.

Mikhail was succeeded in 1645 by his only surviving son Alexei, who steered the country quietly through numerous troubles. Upon Alexei's death in 1676, there was a period of dynastic struggle between his children by his first wife Maria Ilyinichna Miloslavskaya (Feodor III, Sofia Alexeyevna, Ivan V) and his son by his second wife Nataliya Kyrillovna Naryshkina, the future Peter the Great. Peter ruled from 1682 until his death in 1725. In numerous successful wars he expanded the tsardom into a huge empire that became a major European power. He led a cultural revolution that replaced some of the traditionalist and medieval social and political system with a modern, scientific, Europe-oriented, and rationalist system.

New dynastic struggles followed the death of Peter. His only son to survive into adulthood, Tsarevich Alexei, did not support Peter's modernization of Russia. He had previously been arrested and died in prison shortly thereafter. Near the end of his life, Peter managed to alter the succession tradition of male heirs, allowing him to choose his heir. Power then passed into the hands of his second wife, Empress Catherine, who ruled until her death in 1727. Peter II, the son of Tsarevich Alexei, took the throne but died in 1730, ending the Romanov male line. He was succeeded by Anna I, daughter of Peter the Great's half-brother and co-ruler, Ivan V. Before she died in 1740 the empress declared that her grandnephew, Ivan VI, should succeed her. This was an attempt to secure the line of her father, while excluding descendants of Peter the Great from inheriting the throne. Ivan VI was only a one-year-old infant at the time of his succession to the throne, and his parents, Grand Duchess Anna Leopoldovna and Duke Anthony Ulrich of Brunswick, the ruling regent, were detested for their German counselors and relations. As a consequence, shortly after Empress Anna's death, Elizabeth Petrovna, a legitimized daughter of Peter I, managed to gain the favor of the populace and dethroned Ivan VI in a coup d'état, supported by the Preobrazhensky Regiment and the ambassadors of France and Sweden. Ivan VI was murdered in 1764 while imprisoned, and his parents died from illness during their captivity.

=== Holstein-Gottorp-Romanov ===
Arms of the House of Holstein-Gottorp-Romanov

The Holstein-Gottorps of Russia retained the Romanov surname, emphasizing their matrilineal descent from Peter the Great, through Anna Petrovna (Peter I's elder daughter by his second wife). In 1742, Empress Elizabeth of Russia brought Anna's son, her nephew Peter of Holstein-Gottorp, to St. Petersburg and proclaimed him her heir. In time, she married him off to a German princess, Sophia of Anhalt-Zerbst. In 1762, shortly after the death of Empress Elizabeth, Sophia, who had taken the Russian name Catherine upon her marriage, overthrew her unpopular husband, with the aid of her lover, Grigory Orlov. She reigned as Catherine the Great. Catherine's son, Paul I, who succeeded his mother in 1796, was particularly proud to be a great-grandson of Peter the Great, although his mother's memoirs arguably insinuate that Paul's natural father was, in fact, her lover Sergei Saltykov, rather than her husband, Peter. Painfully aware of the hazards resulting from battles of succession, Paul decreed house laws for the Romanovs – the so-called Pauline Laws, among the strictest in Europe – which established semi-Salic primogeniture as the rule of succession to the throne, requiring Orthodox faith for the monarch and dynasts, and for the consorts of the monarchs and their near heirs. Later, Alexander I, responding to the 1820 morganatic marriage of his brother and heir, added the requirement that consorts of all Russian dynasts in the male line had to be of equal birth (i.e., born to a royal or sovereign dynasty).

=== Age of Autocracy ===
Paul I was murdered in his palace in Saint Petersburg in 1801. Alexander I succeeded him on the throne and later died without leaving a son. His brother, crowned Nicholas I, succeeded him on the throne in 1825. The succession was far from smooth, however, as hundreds of troops took the oath of allegiance to Nicholas's elder brother, Constantine Pavlovich who, unbeknownst to them, had renounced his claim to the throne in 1822, following his marriage. The confusion, combined with opposition to Nicholas's accession, led to the Decembrist revolt. Nicholas I fathered four sons, educating them for the prospect of ruling Russia and for military careers, from whom the last branches of the dynasty descended.

Alexander II, son of Nicholas I, became the next Russian emperor in 1855, in the midst of the Crimean War. While Alexander considered it his charge to maintain peace in Europe and Russia, he believed only a strong Russian military could keep the peace. By developing the Imperial Russian Army, giving increased autonomy to Finland, and freeing the serfs in 1861, he gained much popular support for his reign.

Despite his popularity, however, his family life began to unravel by the mid-1860s. In 1864, his eldest son, and heir, Tsarevich Nicholas, died suddenly. His wife, Empress Maria Alexandrovna, who suffered from tuberculosis, spent much of her time abroad. Alexander eventually turned to a mistress, Princess Catherine Dolgorukova. Immediately following the death of his wife in 1880, he contracted a morganatic marriage with Dolgorukova. His legitimization of their children, and rumors that he was contemplating crowning his new wife as empress, caused tension within the dynasty. In particular, the grand duchesses were scandalized at the prospect of deferring to a woman who had borne Alexander several children during his wife's lifetime. Before Princess Catherine could be elevated in rank, however, on 13 March 1881 Alexander was assassinated by a hand-made bomb hurled by Ignacy Hryniewiecki. Slavic patriotism, cultural revival, and Panslavist ideas grew in importance in the latter half of this century, evoking expectations of a more Russian than cosmopolitan dynasty. Several marriages were contracted with members of other reigning Slavic or Orthodox dynasties (Greece, Montenegro, Serbia). In the early 20th century, two Romanov princesses were allowed to marry Russian high noblemen – whereas, until the 1850s, practically all marriages had been with German princelings.

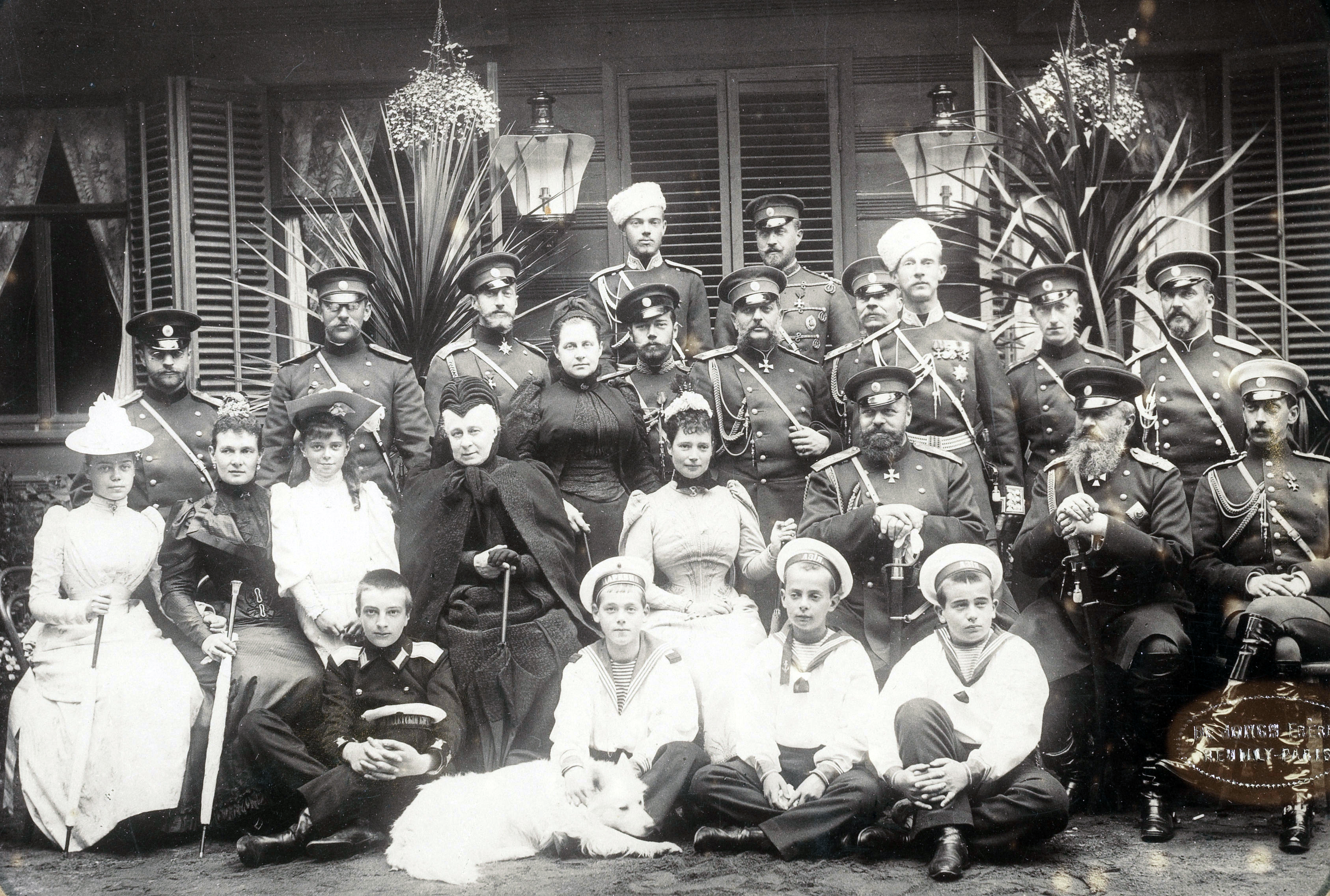
A gathering of members of the Romanov family in 1892, at the summer military manoeuvres in Krasnoye Selo

His son Alexander III succeeded Alexander II. This tsar, the second-to-last Romanov emperor, was responsible for conservative reforms in Russia. Not expected to inherit the throne, he was educated in matters of state only after the death of his older brother, Nicholas. Lack of diplomatic training may have influenced his politics as well as those of his son, Nicholas II. Alexander III was physically impressive, being not only tall (1.93 m or 6'4", according to some sources), but of large physique and considerable strength. His beard hearkened back to the likeness of tsars of old, contributing to an aura of brusque authority, awe-inspiring to some, alienating to others. Alexander, fearful of the fate which had befallen his father, strengthened autocratic rule in Russia. Some of the reforms the more liberal Alexander II had pushed through were reversed.

Alexander had inherited not only his dead brother's position as Tsesarevich, but also his brother's Danish fiancée, Princess Dagmar. Taking the name Maria Feodorovna upon her conversion to Orthodoxy, she was the daughter of King Christian IX of Denmark and the sister of the future kings Frederik VIII and George I of Greece, as well as of Britain's Queen Alexandra, consort of Edward VII. Despite contrasting natures and backgrounds, the marriage was considered harmonious, producing six children and acquiring for Alexander the reputation of being the first tsar not known to take mistresses.

His eldest son, Nicholas, became emperor upon Alexander III's death due to kidney disease at age 49 in November 1894. Nicholas reputedly said, "I am not ready to be tsar...." Just a week after the funeral, Nicholas married his fiancée, Alix of Hesse-Darmstadt, a favorite grandchild of Queen Victoria of the United Kingdom. Nicholas II was known to be a weak, concave, and politically indecisive leader. He would teeter on the cusp of left and right for certain issues within the country to avoid political conflict; this only served to cause more political unrest within Russia. The Russo - Japanese war, as well as Russia’s “iffy” world war I stance, rocked many Russians around the country as they had little to no idea where Nicholas II’s loyalty lied. He had little experience in government as well, and once more, it was only shortly after his coronation that he married stated "Princess Alix of Hesse”, a woman of German - Dutch origin, who became (the last) Tsarina of Russia, Alexandra.Though a kind-hearted man, he tended to leave intact his father's harsh policies. For her part, the shy Alix, who took the name Alexandra Feodorovna, became a devout convert to Orthodoxy as well as a devoted wife to Nicholas and mother to their five children, yet avoided many of the social duties traditional for Russia's tsarinas. Seen as distant and severe, unfavorable comparisons were drawn between her and her popular mother-in-law, Maria Fyodorovna. When, in September 1915, Nicholas took command of the army at the front lines during World War I, Alexandra sought to influence him toward an authoritarian approach in government affairs even more than she had done during peacetime. His well-known devotion to her injured both his and the dynasty's reputation during World War I, due to both her German origin and her unique relationship with Rasputin, whose role in the life of her only son was not widely known. Alexandra was a carrier of the gene for haemophilia, inherited from her maternal grandmother, Queen Victoria. Her son, Alexei, the long-awaited heir to the throne, inherited the disease and suffered agonizing bouts of protracted bleeding, the pain of which was sometimes partially alleviated by Rasputin's ministrations. Nicholas and Alexandra also had four daughters: the Grand Duchesses Olga, Tatiana, Maria and Anastasia.

The six crowned representatives of the Holstein-Gottorp-Romanov line were: Paul (1796–1801), Alexander I (1801–1825), Nicholas I (1825–1855), Alexander II (1855–1881), Alexander III (1881–1894), and Nicholas II (1894–1917).

Constantine Pavlovich and Michael Alexandrovich, both morganatically married, are occasionally counted among Russia's emperors by historians who observe that the Russian monarchy did not legally permit interregnums. Yet neither was crowned; Constantine renounced the throne before his brother's death, and Michael deferred his acceptance of the throne, effectively ending the monarchy.

=== Downfall ===
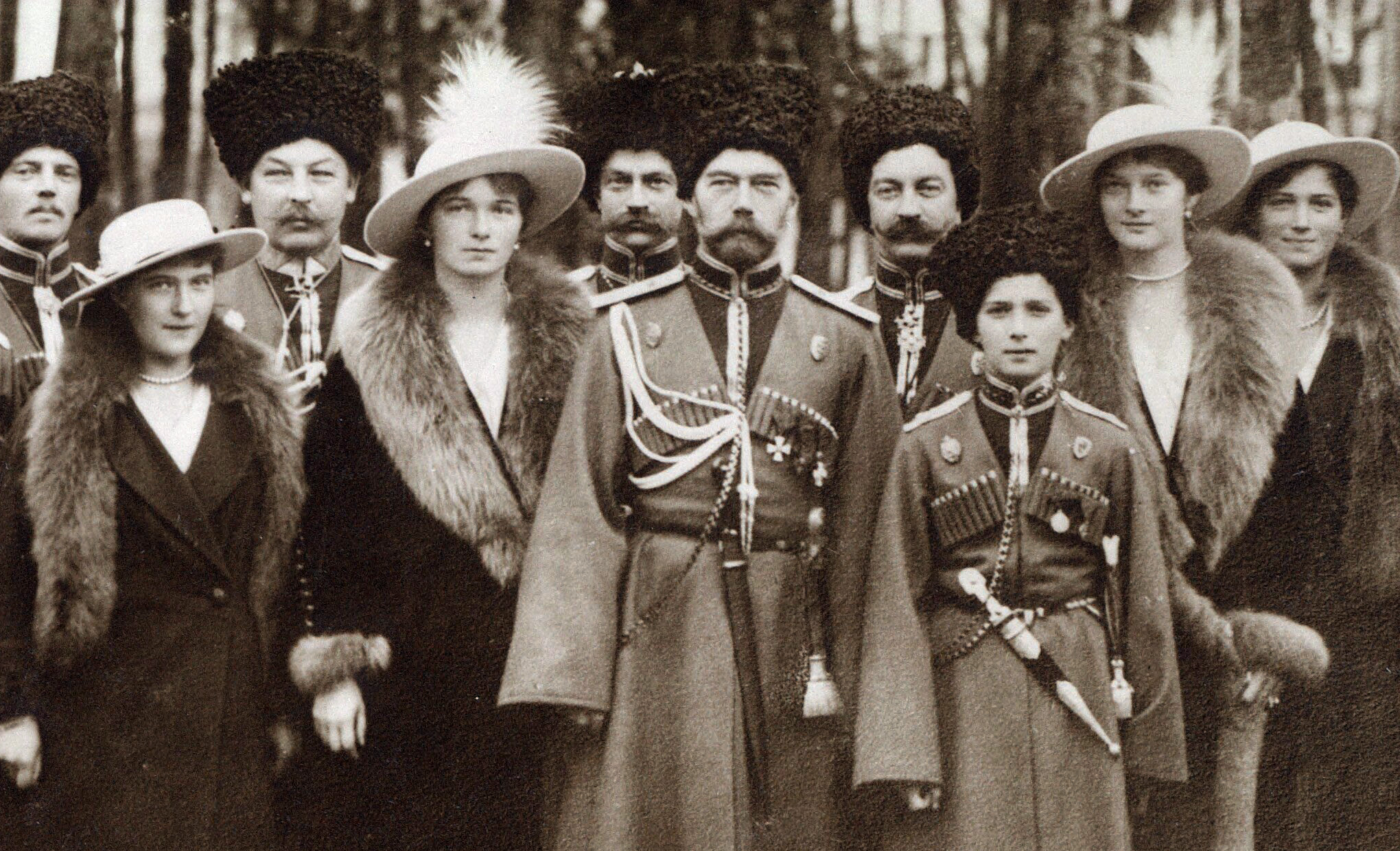
The Romanovs visiting a regiment during World War I. From left to right, Grand Duchess Anastasia, Grand Duchess Olga, Tsar Nicholas II, Tsarevich Alexei, Grand Duchess Tatiana, and Grand Duchess Maria, and Kuban Cossacks.

The February Revolution of 1917 resulted in the abdication of Nicholas II in favor of his brother Grand Duke Michael Alexandrovich. The latter declined to accept imperial authority save to delegate it to the Provisional Government pending a future democratic referendum, effectively terminating the Romanov dynasty's rule over Russia.

After the February Revolution, Nicholas II and his family were placed under house arrest in the Alexander Palace. While several members of the imperial family managed to stay on good terms with the Provisional Government and were eventually able to leave Russia, Nicholas II and his family were sent into exile in the Siberian town of Tobolsk by Alexander Kerensky in August 1917. In the October Revolution of 1917 the Bolsheviks ousted the Provisional Government. In April 1918, the Romanovs were moved to the Russian town of Yekaterinburg, in the Urals, where they were placed in the Ipatiev House. Here, on the night of 16–18 July 1918, the entire Russian Imperial Romanov family, along with several of their retainers, were executed by Bolshevik revolutionaries, most likely on the orders of Vladimir Lenin.

=== Executions ===
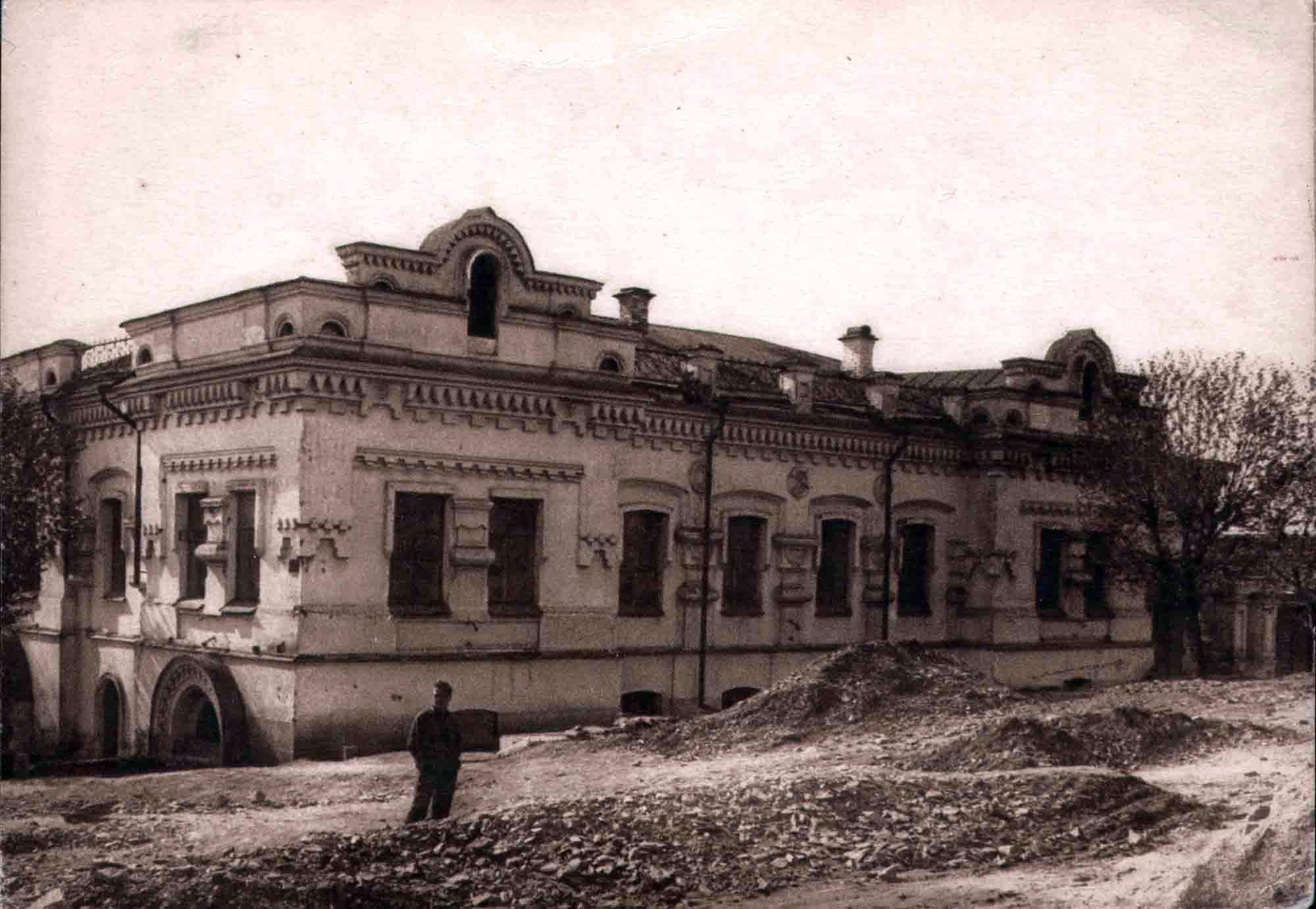
Ipatiev House, Yekaterinburg (later Sverdlovsk) in 1928

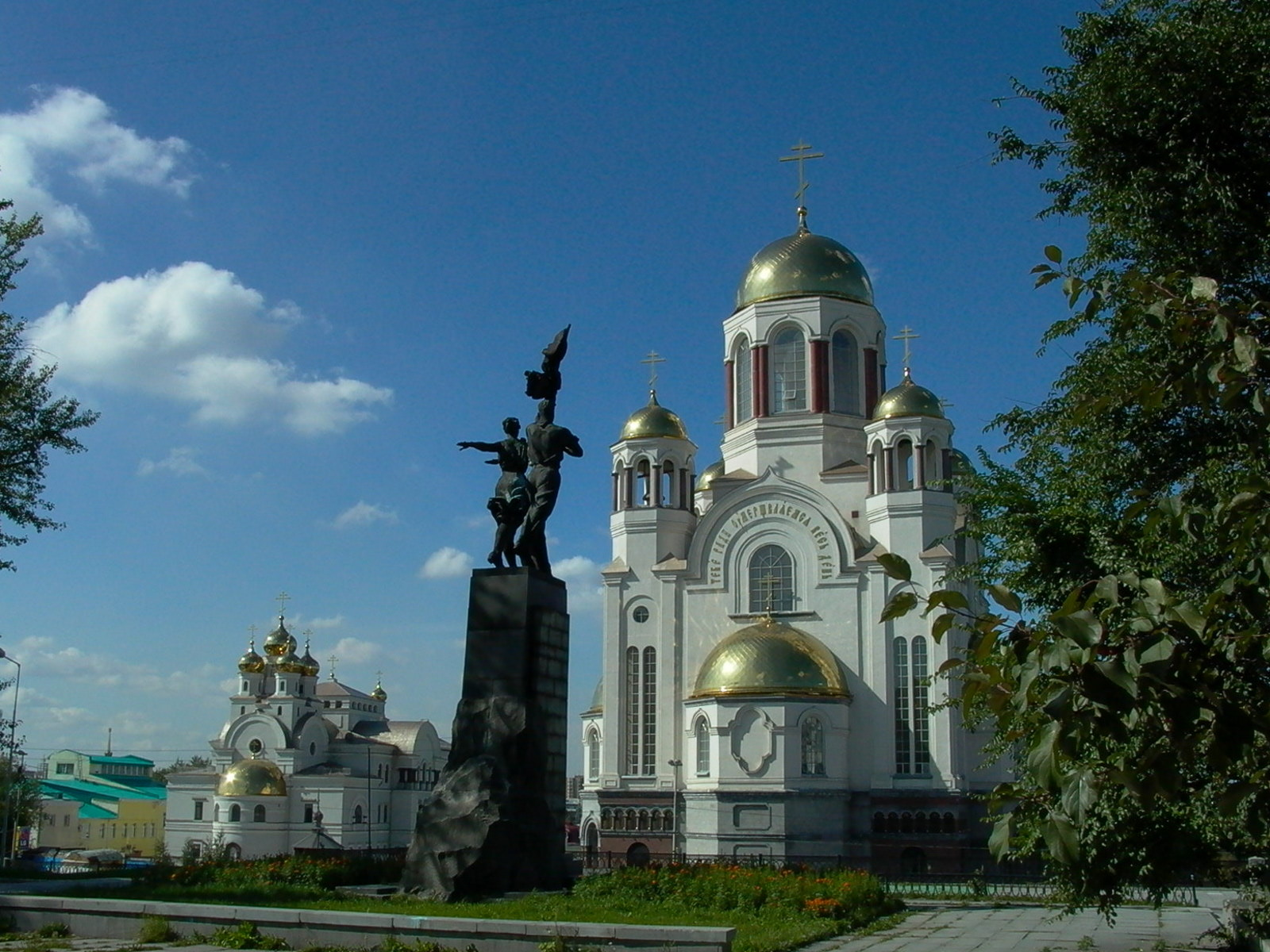
Yekaterinburg's "Church on the Blood", built on the spot where the last tsar and his family were killed

Late on the night of 16 July, Nicholas, Alexandra, their five children and four servants were ordered to dress quickly and go down to the cellar of the house in which they were being held. There, the family and servants were arranged in two rows for a photograph they were told was being taken to quell rumors that they had escaped. Suddenly, a dozen armed men burst into the room and gunned down the imperial family in a hail of gunfire. Those who survived the shooting were stabbed to death.

The remains of Nicholas, Alexandra and three of their children were excavated in a forest near Yekaterinburg in 1991 and positively identified two years later using DNA analysis. The Tsesarevich Alexei and one Romanov daughter were not accounted for, fueling the persistent legend that Anastasia, the youngest Romanov daughter, had survived the execution of her family. Of the several "Anastasias" that surfaced in Europe in the decade after the Russian Revolution, Anna Anderson, who died in the United States in 1984, was the most convincing. In 1994, however, scientists used DNA testing to prove that Anna Anderson was not the tsar's daughter but a Polish woman named Franziska Schanzkowska.

Initially, gunmen shot at Nicholas who immediately fell dead as a result of multiple bullet wounds. Then the dark room where the family was held filled with smoke and dust from the spray of bullets. With limited visibility, the gunmen shot blindly, often hitting the ceiling and walls, creating more dust and debris. As a result of this many of the gunmen themselves were injured. Alexandra was soon shot in the head by military commissar Peter Ermakov and was killed. It was not until after the room had been cleared of smoke that the shooters re-entered to find the remaining imperial family still alive and uninjured. Maria attempted to escape through the doors at the rear of the room, leading to a storage area, but the doors were nailed shut. The noise produced as she rattled the doors attracted the attention of Ermakov. Some of the family were shot in the head, but several of the others, including the young and frail tsarevich, would not die either from multiple close-range bullet wounds or bayonet stabs. The gunmen then proceeded to shoot each family member once again. Even so, two of the daughters were still alive 10 minutes later, and were then bludgeoned to death with the butt of a rifle. Later it was discovered that the bullets and bayonet stabs had been partially blocked by diamonds sewn into the children's clothing.

Following the murder of the Romanov family, the Bolsheviks made several attempts to dispose of the bodies. Initially the bodies were to be thrown down a mineshaft; however, the location of the disposal site was revealed to locals, causing them to change the location. Instead of a burial, the Bolsheviks decided to burn two of the corpses of the former royal family. Burning the corpses proved to be difficult as it took significant time, so the group resorted to disfiguring the pair with acid. In a rush, the Bolsheviks threw nine additional bodies into a grave and covered them with acid as well.

The bodies of the Romanovs were then hidden and moved several times before being interred in an unmarked pit where they remained until the summer of 1979 when amateur enthusiasts disinterred and re-buried some of them, and then decided to conceal the find until the fall of the USSR. In 1991 the grave site was excavated and the bodies were given a state funeral under the nascent democracy of post-Soviet Russia, and several years later DNA and other forensic evidence was used by Russian and international scientists to make accurate identifications.

The Ipatiev House has the same name as the Ipatiev Monastery in Kostroma, where Mikhail Romanov had been offered the Russian Crown in 1613. The large memorial church "on the blood" has been built on the spot where the Ipatiev House once stood.

Nicholas II and his family were proclaimed passion-bearers by the Russian Orthodox Church in 2000. In Orthodoxy, a passion-bearer is a saint who was not killed because of his faith, like a martyr; but who died in faith at the hand of murderers.

==== Remains ====
Tombstones marking the burial of Tsar Nicholas II and his family in St. Catherine's Chapel at Peter and Paul Cathedral

In the mid-1970s, Dr. Alexander Avdonin discovered the mass grave containing the remains of Nicholas II, Alexandra Feodorovna, and three of five Romanov children. The remains were found near Old Koptyaki road in Yekaterinburg, Russia. The grave contained 44 heavily degraded bone and tooth fragments. Avdonin released his discovery following the collapse of the Soviet Union in 1991 prompting investigation by the Russian government.

The area where the remains were found was near the old Koptyaki Road, under what appeared to be double bonfire sites about 70 meters (230 ft) from the mass grave in Pigs Meadow near Yekaterinburg. The archaeologists stated that the bones were from a boy who approximately between the ages of 10 and 13 years at the time of his death and of a young woman who was between the ages of 18 and 23 years old. At the time, Anastasia was 17 years old while Maria was 19 years. Their brother Alexei was just a few weeks away from turning 14. Alexei's elder sisters Olga and Tatiana were 22 and 21 years old at the time of the murder respectively. The bones were found using metal detectors and metal rods as probes. Also, striped material was found that appeared to have been from a blue-and-white striped cloth; Alexei commonly wore a blue-and-white striped undershirt.

In mid-2007, a Russian archaeologist announced a discovery by one of his workers. The excavation uncovered the following items in the two pits which formed a "T":

- remains of 44 human bone fragments;
- bullet jackets from short barrel guns/pistols;
- wooden boxes which had deteriorated into fragments;
- pieces of ceramic which appear to be amphoras which were used as containers for acid;
- iron nails;
- iron angles;
- seven fragments of teeth;
- fragment of fabric of a garment.

Geneticists used a combination of autosomal STR and mtDNA sequencing to detect relationships between the family members' remains. Using a DNA sample from Prince Philip, Duke of Edinburgh, a grand nephew of Alexandra, scientists matched his DNA to her and her children's remains found in the mass grave. The investigation concluded that Alexei and one Romanov daughter were missing. Experts continue to debate which daughter was missing from the grave; those from the United States believe the missing child to be Anastasia, while those from Russia believe it to be Maria. However, "conspiracy theories" persisted throughout the 20th century, with some authors still contending that "somehow the real Anastasia, Maria, or perhaps Aleksei, might have survived the Russian Revolution" even after the discovery of the bodies and the confirmation of their identities was made public. Additionally, despite their discovery in 2007, the remains of the two bodies found in the separate grave did not "receive a proper burial due to the Russian Orthodox Church's unsubstantiated doubts about their authenticity."

As for Nicholas II, scientists used mtDNA heteroplasmy using samples from Princess Xenia Cheremeteff Sfiri and the Duke of Fife. In the early 1990s, considerable controversy surrounded the accuracy of mtDNA heteroplasmy for DNA testing particularly for distant relatives. In an attempt to refine the results of the investigation, Russian authorities exhumed the remains of Nicholas II's brother, George Alexandrovich. George's remains matched the heteroplasmy of the remains found in the grave, indicating that they did in fact belong to Tsar Nicholas II.

After the bodies were exhumed in June 1991, they remained in laboratories until 1998, while there was a debate as to whether they should be reburied in Yekaterinburg or St. Petersburg. A commission eventually chose St. Petersburg. The remains were transferred with full military honor guard and accompanied by members of the Romanov family from Yekaterinburg to St. Petersburg. In St. Petersburg remains of the imperial family were moved by a formal military honor guard cortege from the airport to St Petersburg's Saints Peter and Paul Cathedral where they (along with several loyal servants who were killed with them) were interred in a special chapel near the tombs of their ancestors. At the cathedral, the remaining Romanov family hosted a formal funeral for Tsar Nicholas II attended by many relatives and representatives from nations worldwide.

==== Other executions ====
On 18 July 1918, the day after the killing at Yekaterinburg of the tsar and his family, members of the extended Russian imperial family were killed near Alapayevsk by Bolsheviks. They included: Grand Duke Sergei Mikhailovich of Russia, Prince Ioann Konstantinovich of Russia, Prince Konstantin Konstantinovich of Russia, Prince Igor Konstantinovich of Russia and Prince Vladimir Pavlovich Paley, Grand Duke Sergei's secretary Varvara Yakovleva, and Grand Duchess Elisabeth Feodorovna, a granddaughter of Queen Victoria and elder sister of Tsarina Alexandra. Following the 1905 assassination of her husband, Grand Duke Sergei Alexandrovich, Elisabeth Feodorovna had ceased living as a member of the Imperial family and took up life as a serving nun, but was nonetheless arrested and slated for death with other Romanovs. They were thrown down a mine shaft into which explosives were then dropped, all being left to die there slowly.

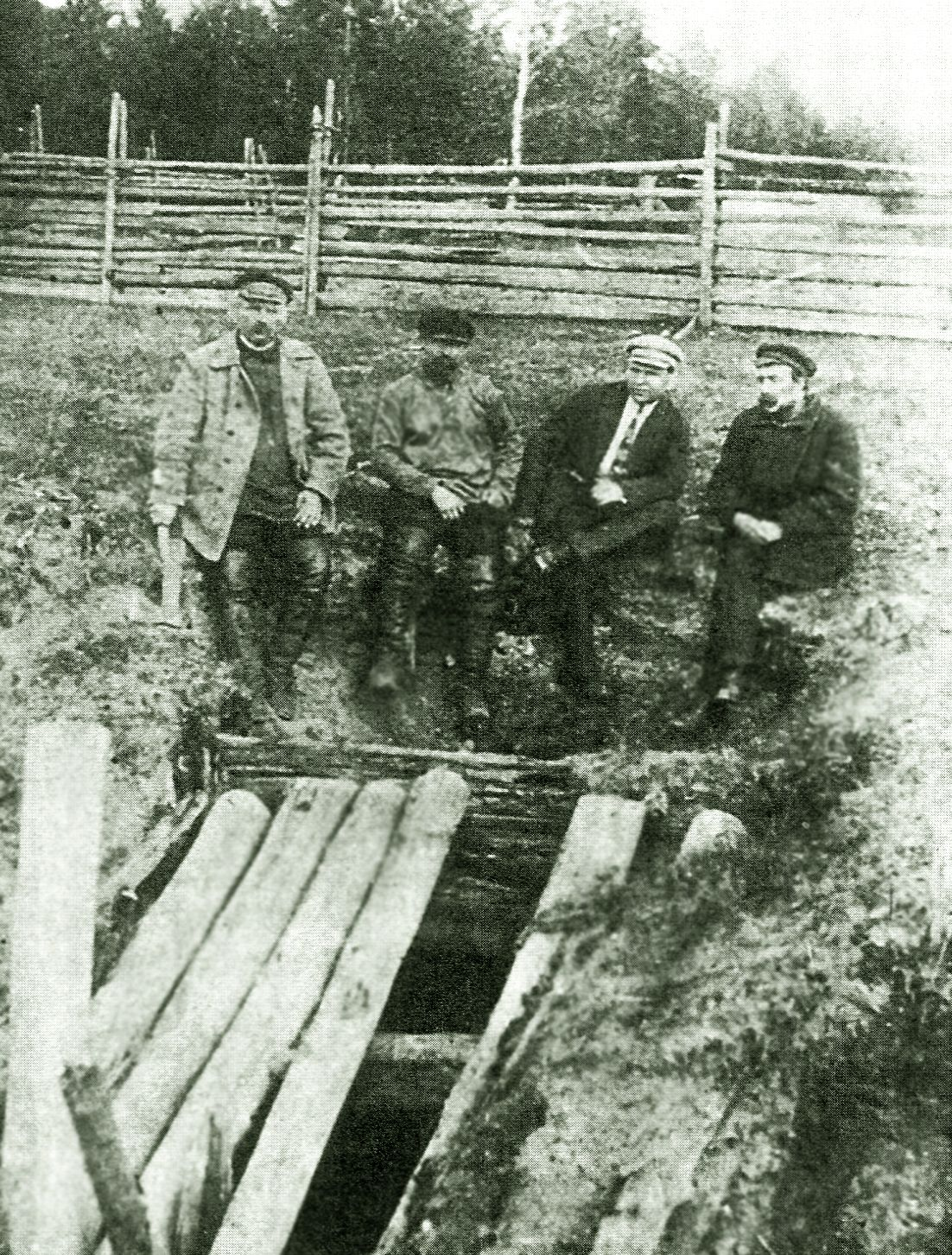
Mine shaft in Alapaevsk where remains of the Romanovs killed there were found

The bodies were recovered from the mine by the White Army in 1918, who arrived too late to rescue them. Their remains were placed in coffins and moved around Russia during struggles between the White and the opposing Red Army. By 1920, the coffins were interred in a former Russian mission in Beijing, now beneath a parking area. In 1981 Grand Duchess Elisabeth was canonized by the Russian Orthodox Church Outside of Russia, and in 1992 by the Moscow Patriarchate. In 2006, representatives of the Romanov family were making plans to re-inter the remains elsewhere. The town became a place of pilgrimage to the memory of Elisabeth Fyodorovna, whose remains were eventually re-interred in Jerusalem.

On 13 June 1918, Bolshevik revolutionary authorities killed Grand Duke Michael Alexandrovich of Russia and Nicholas Johnson (Michael's secretary) in Perm. Their bodies were not found.

The exiled Grand Duke Nicholas Konstantinovich of Russia died on 26 January 1918, with some rumors claiming he was killed by the Bolsheviks. His son Prince Artemy Nikolayevich Romanovsky-Iskander died on 8 October 1935 in Paris.

In January 1919, revolutionary authorities killed Grand Dukes Dmitry Konstantinovich, Nikolai Mikhailovich, Paul Alexandrovich and George Mikhailovich, who had been held in the prison of the Saint Peter and Paul Fortress in Petrograd. The four Grand Dukes were buried in a mass grave in the fortress, though Dmitry Konstantinovich's body was collected by his former adjutant, rolled up in a rug and taken away for a private burial in the garden of a house in Petrograd, where he remains to this day.

=== Exiles ===
==== Dowager Empress Maria Fyodorovna ====
In 1919, Maria Feodorovna, widow of Alexander III, and mother of Nicholas II, managed to escape Russia aboard HMS Marlborough, which her nephew, King George V of the United Kingdom, had sent to rescue her, at the urging of his own mother, Queen Alexandra, who was Maria's elder sister. After a stay in England with Queen Alexandra, she returned to her native Denmark, first living at Amalienborg Palace, with her nephew, King Christian X, and later, at Villa Hvidøre. Upon her death in 1928, her coffin was placed in the crypt of Roskilde Cathedral, the burial site of members of the Danish royal family.

In 2005, the coffin with her remains was moved to the Peter and Paul Fortress to be buried beside that of her husband. The transfer of her remains was accompanied by an elaborate ceremony at Saint Isaac's Cathedral officiated by Patriarch Alexy II of Moscow. Descendants and relatives of the Dowager Empress attended, including her great-grandson Prince Michael Andreevich, Princess Catherine Ivanovna of Russia, the last living member of the Imperial Family born before the fall of the dynasty, and Prince Dmitri and Prince Nicholas Romanov.

==== Other exiles ====
Among the other exiles who managed to leave Russia were Maria Feodorovna's two daughters, the Grand Duchesses Xenia Alexandrovna and Olga Alexandrovna, with their husbands, Grand Duke Alexander Mikhailovich and Nikolai Kulikovsky, respectively, and their children, as well as the spouses of Xenia's elder two children and her granddaughter. Xenia remained in England, following her mother's return to Denmark, although after their mother's death Olga moved to Canada with her husband, both sisters dying in 1960. Grand Duchess Maria Pavlovna, widow of Nicholas II's uncle, Grand Duke Vladimir, and her children the Grand Dukes Kiril, Boris and Andrei, and Kiril's wife Victoria Melita and children, also managed to flee Russia. Grand Duke Dmitri Pavlovich, a cousin of Nicholas II, had been exiled to the Caucasus in 1916 for his part in the murder of Grigori Rasputin, and managed to escape Russia. His sister Grand Duchess Maria Pavlovna, alongside her husband and brother-in-law, was able to escape into German-occupied Ukraine before being granted asylum by her cousin Queen Marie of Romania. Grand Duke Nicholas Nikolaievich, who was supreme commander of Russian troops during World War I prior to Nicholas II taking command, along with his brother, Grand Duke Peter, and their wives, Grand Duchesses Anastasia and Militza, who were sisters, and Peter's children, son-in-law, and granddaughter also fled the country.

Elizaveta Mavrikievna, widow of Konstantin Konstantinovich, escaped with her daughter Vera Konstantinovna and her son Georgii Konstantinovich, as well as her grandson Prince Vsevolod Ivanovich and her granddaughter Princess Catherine Ivanovna to Sweden. Her other daughter, Tatiana Konstantinovna, also escaped with her children Natasha and Teymuraz, as well as her uncle's aide-de-camp Alexander Korochenzov. They fled to Romania and then Switzerland. Gavriil Konstantinovich was imprisoned before fleeing to Paris.

Ioann Konstantinovich's wife, Elena Petrovna, was imprisoned in Alapayevsk and Perm, before escaping to Sweden and Nice, France.

Olga Constantinovna of Russia, Dowager Queen of Greece, who had returned to Russia in her widowhood, was able to escape to Switzerland with the help of the Danish embassy. Her daughter Maria Georgievna, wife of George Mikhailovich, had been vacationing in England with her daughters Nina and Xenia when the war broke out and chose not to return to Russia. The other Grand Duchesses by birth who were living abroad during the Revolution as a result of marrying into other royal families included the Dowager Duchess of Saxe-Coburg and Gotha, the Dowager Grand Duchess of Mecklenburg-Schwerin, and Princess Nicholas of Greece and Denmark.

== Contemporary Romanovs ==
There have been numerous post-Revolution reports of Romanov survivors and unsubstantiated claims by individuals to be members of the deposed Tsar Nicholas II's family, the best known being Anna Anderson. Nonetheless, proven research has confirmed that all of the Romanovs held prisoner inside the Ipatiev House in Yekaterinburg were killed.

Grand Duke Kirill Vladimirovich, a male-line grandson of Tsar Alexander II, claimed the headship of the deposed Imperial House of Russia, and assumed, as pretender, the title "Emperor and Autocrat of all the Russias" in 1924 when the evidence appeared conclusive that all Romanovs higher in the line of succession had been killed. Kirill was followed by his only son Vladimir Kirillovich, married to Princess Leonida Bagration of Mukhrani. Vladimir's only child is Maria Vladimirovna (born 1953), who had one child in her marriage with Prince Franz Wilhelm of Prussia, George Mikhailovich. Since 1991, the succession to the former Russian throne has been in dispute, largely due to disagreements over the validity of dynasts' marriages. When Vladimir Kirillovich died on 21 April 1992, his daughter Maria claimed to succeed him as head of the Russian Imperial Family on the grounds that she was the only child of the last male dynast of the Imperial house according to the Romanovs' Pauline laws, which granted succession rights only to the offspring born out of equal unions with other reigning or mediatised houses. Since then, her son George Mikhailovich has contracted a morganatic marriage with the Italian citizen Rebecca Bettarini, leaving him and his mother as the last remaining members of the Imperial House (according to their claims).

Others have argued in support of the rights of the late Prince Nicholas Romanov, whose brother Prince Dimitri Romanov was the next male heir of his branch after whom it was passed to Prince Andrew Romanov and then to his son Alexis Romanoff. All of them were born out of unequal marriages and are or were members of the Romanov Family Association formed in 1979, a private organization of most living male-line descendants of Emperor Paul I of Russia (other than Maria Vladimirovna and her son), which publicly acknowledges that dynastic claims of family members should not be advanced, and is officially committed to support whichever form of government is chosen by the Russian people.

Alternatively, Prince Karl Emich of Leiningen (a great-nephew of Vladimir Kirillovich through his sister, Maria) has been a claimant to the defunct Russian throne since 2013. He and his supporters argue that the marriage of Maria Vladimirovna's parents was in contravention of the Pauline Laws. They maintain that the House of Bagration-Mukhrani did not possess sovereign status and was not recognized as equal by Nicholas II for the purpose of dynastic marriages at the time of the union of Princess Tatiana Constantinovna of Russia and Prince Constantine Bagration-Mukhransky in 1911, thirty seven years prior to that of Princess Leonida and Grand Duke Vladimir Kirillovich. Therefore, as the next of kin to Vladimir (in the exclusion of his daughter), the Russian Monarchist Party recognises Karl Emich as the heir to the Russian throne, since he and his wife converted on 1 June 2013, from Lutheranism to Eastern Orthodox Christianity, enabling his accession.

== Branches ==
The Russian Imperial Family was split into four main branches named after the sons of Emperor Nicholas I:

- The Alexandrovichi (descendants of Emperor Alexander II of Russia) (with further subdivisions named The Vladimirovichi and The Pavlovichi after two of Alexander II's younger sons)
- The Konstantinovichi (descendants of Grand Duke Constantine Nicholaevich of Russia)
- The Nikolaevichi (descendants of Grand Duke Nicholas Nikolaevich of Russia)
- The Mikhailovichi (descendants of Grand Duke Michael Nicolaevich of Russia)

== Wealth and finances ==
The Imperial House Laws of Russia set out the financial entitlements of members of the extended Imperial Family. A range of sources cite various figures for the income and lump-sum payments which the descendants of the Emperor were entitled to.

The 1912 edition of the Svod Zakonov (the Russian Empire’s official Digest of Laws) reprints the revised Statute on the Imperial Family which was approved on 2/14 July 1886. This defines who qualified for titles and how support was structured. The Brockhaus & Efron Encyclopedic Dictionary (1890s), a standard Russian reference work, summarizes the administrative stipend scales then in force for imperial children and grandchildren. These sources are examined in Mikhail Dolbilov’s 2023 peer-reviewed study "Managing the Ruling House: Royals, Bureaucrats, and the Emergence of the 1886 Statute on the Imperial Family of the Russian Empire", which offers a detailed examination of the post-1886 financial provisions for the Imperial Family, with reference to the 1886 "Norms of financing" (RGIA) section. These sources provide the following data on the annuities and financial entitlements of the wider Romanov Family during the period from 1886 to 1917:

Financial Entitlements for Members of the Russian Imperial Family after 1886
| Rank of Family Member | Financial Entitlement at Birth | Financial Entitlement from Majority | Financial Entitlement upon marriage |
|---|---|---|---|
| Sons of the Emperor (Grand Dukes) | ₽33,000 per year prior to majority. | Annuity increased to ₽150,000 per year; and granted a one-off lump sum of ₽1,000,000. | Annuity increased to ₽200,000 per year, plus a separate ₽40,000 annuity granted to their wife, who also received one-time grants of ₽100,000 (from Emperor) and ₽50,000 (from husband). The widow of the son of an Emperor would continue to receive ₽40,000 annually (reduced to one-third of this amount if residing abroad during their widowhood, and ceasing to be paid if she remarried). |
| Daughters of the Emperor (Grand Duchesses) | ₽33,000 per year to majority. | Annuity increased to ₽50,000 per year until marriage. | ₽50,000 annuity ceases, replaced by a Dowry lump-sum payment of ₽1,000,000 (held in Trust in Russia with income paid at 5%). |
| Male-line Grandsons of an Emperor (Grand Dukes) | ₽15,000 per year to majority. | Annuity increased to ₽150,000 per year; and granted a one-off lump-sum of ₽600,000. | No increase in individual annuity, but a separate annuity of ₽20,000 was paid to their wife, who also would receive one-time grants of ₽100,000 (from Emperor) and ₽50,000 (from husband). The widow of the grandson of an Emperor would continue to receive ₽20,000 annually (reduced to one-third of this amount if residing abroad during their widowhood, and ceasing to be paid if she remarried). |
| Male-line Granddaughters of an Emperor (Grand Duchesses) | ₽15,000 per year to majority. | Annuity increased to ₽50,000 per year until marriage. | ₽50,000 annuity ceases, replaced by a Dowry lump-sum payment of ₽1,000,000 (held in Trust in Russia with income paid at 5%). |

Following the Russian Revolution, the reputed size of the deposed Emperor's personal fortune was subject to various rumours and estimates, many of which were likely exaggerated. As Emperor of All The Russias, and an autocrat, the resources under his command were virtually incalculable. However, the vast majority of this was owned by the state as crown property; the Romanov family's personal wealth was only a fraction of this. As monarch, the income of Nicholas was 24 million gold roubles per annum: this derived from a yearly allowance from the treasury, and from the profits of crown farmland. From this income, he had to fund staff, the upkeep of imperial palaces and imperial theatres, annuities for the royal family, pensions, bequests, and other outgoings; consequently "before the end of the year, the Tsar was usually penniless; sometimes he reached this embarrassing state by autumn." According to the Grand Marshal of the Court, Count Paul Benckendorff, the family's total financial resources amounted to between 12.5 and 17.5 million roubles. As a comparison, Prince Felix Yusupov estimated his family's worth in real estate holdings alone as amounting to 50 million gold roubles.

The mystery and rumours surrounding the finances of the Romanov Dynasty during the early 20th century were addressed at length in the 1932 memoir of Nicholas II's brother-in-law (and first-cousin once-removed) Grand Duke Alexander Michailovich, Once a Grand Duke. Alexander Mikhailovich claimed that the income of the Russian Emperor prior to the First World War was derived from three main sources:

- An annual governmental appropriate for the Imperial Family, amounting to 11 million gold roubles (410,000 troy oz of gold, which he noted equated to just under $6 million);
- Proceeds from the exploitation of the Estates belonging to the Imperial Family (referred to as the "oodely"), which Grand Duke Alexander states were valued at $50 million, but produced a relatively low annual return of approximately $1–$2 million; and
- Interest from deposits kept abroad in English and German banks.

Alexander Mikhailovich estimated that the aggregate annual income of the Russian Emperor prior to the First World War was $10–$12 million in total. In addition to these sources of income, the 'frozen' assets of the Dynasty (which took the form of a hoard of jewels, gemstones etc.) was worth an estimated $80 million in the early 20th century. From this annual income, the Emperor was required to maintain the costs of the Imperial Court, multiple residences, as well as the annual allowances which members of the Imperial Family were entitled to:

- $100,000 annually to each of the Grand Dukes;
- A dowry of $500,000 to each Grand Duchess upon her marriage;
- A settlement of $500,000 at birth to each Prince or Princess of the Imperial Blood (great-grandchildren in the male-line of each Emperor) which precluded these individuals from any further financial entitlement.

Other sources suggest that the annuity paid to each Grand Duke was 280,000 roubles, whilst Grand Duchesses received an annuity of 50,000 roubles from birth, increased to 100,000 roubles in adulthood, and that a one-off 1,000,000 rouble payment was made to all Grand Duchesses and Grand Dukes when they married. Variations in the figures cited regarding the incomes of the Russian Imperial Family are likely further compounded due to fluctuations in the exchange rate of the Russian Rouble relative to other major currencies during the nineteenth and early twentieth centuries. The approximate exchange rate during the late 19th century between the Rouble and the American Dollar and British Pound was ₽2:$1 and ₽10:£1 in the late 19th century; during the period of 1914 - 1917 this had fallen ₽3:$1 and ₽15:£1.

Grand Duke Alexander Mikhailovich also claimed that the oft-cited private fortune of £20,000,000 which the Tsars had invested in London Merchant Banks had been depleted during the First World War. This fortune, reportedly kept in London since the reign of Alexander II, "had been entirely spent to support the hospitals and various other charities patronized by the imperial family during the war (1915 - 1917)." Alexander Mikhailovich also asserted in his memoirs that in 1914 an "overcareful Minister of the Imperial Court, acting against the orders of the Czar," had transferred the sums held from the annual allowances paid to Emperor Nicholas II's five children to Berlin, amounting to some 7,000,000 roubles; as a result, this part of the Romanov Family's wealth was lost as of result of the hyperinflation in the Weimar Republic which occurred during the early 1920's.

== Romanov family jewelry ==
Most of the treasures are in the diamond fund of Russia and are the most expensive exhibits in museums. The collection of jewels and jewelry collected by the Romanov family during their reign are commonly referred to as the "Russian Crown Jewels" and they include official state regalia as well as personal pieces of jewelry worn by Romanov rulers and their family. After the Tsar was deposed and his family executed, their jewels and jewelry became the property of the new Soviet government. A select number of pieces from the collection were sold at auction by Christie's in London in March 1927. The remaining collection is on view today in the Kremlin Armoury in Moscow.

On 28 August 2009, a Swedish public news outlet reported that a collection of over 60 jewel-covered cigarette cases and cufflinks owned by Grand Duchess Vladimir had been found in the archives of the Swedish Ministry for Foreign Affairs, and was returned to the descendants of Grand Duchess Vladimir. The jewelry was allegedly turned over to the Swedish embassy in St. Petersburg in November 1918 by Duchess Marie of Mecklenburg-Schwerin to keep it safe. The value of the jewelry has been estimated at 20 million Swedish krona (about 2.6 million US dollars).

== Family tree ==
Family tree and timeline of the Romanov dynasty

== Gallery ==
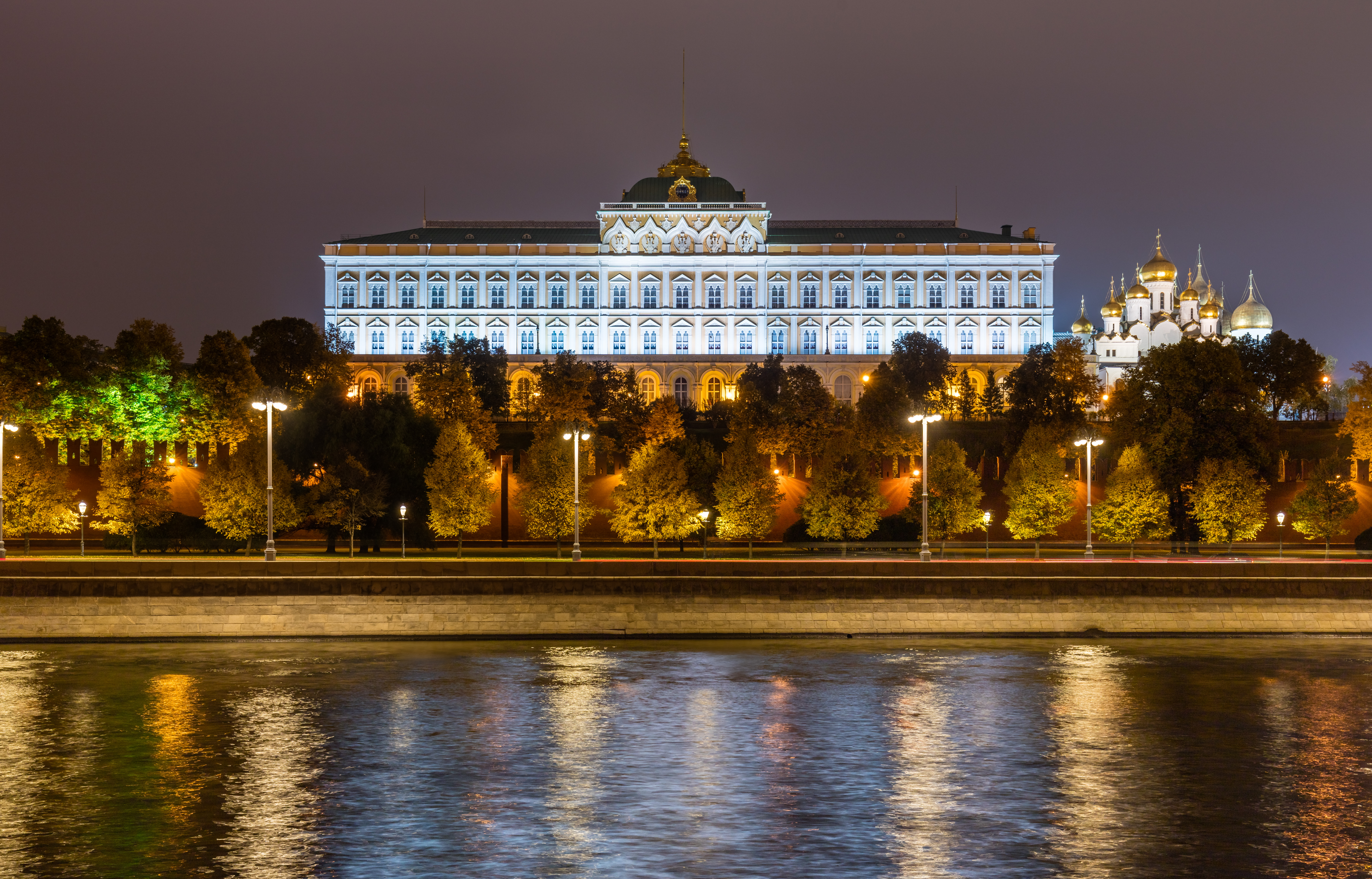
The Grand Kremlin Palace, Moscow

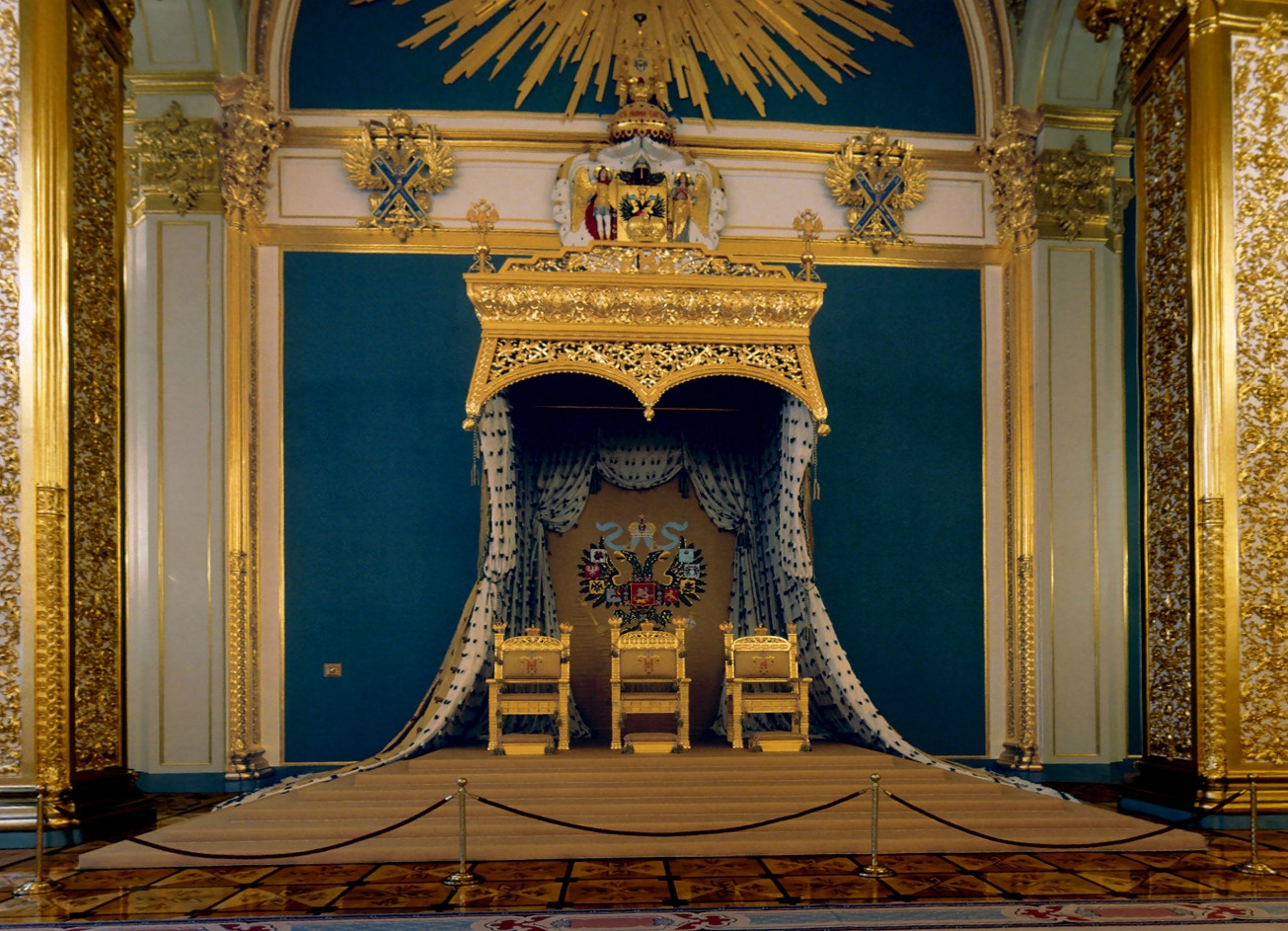
Throne of the Tsar, the Empress and the Empress Mother in the Grand Kremlin Palace

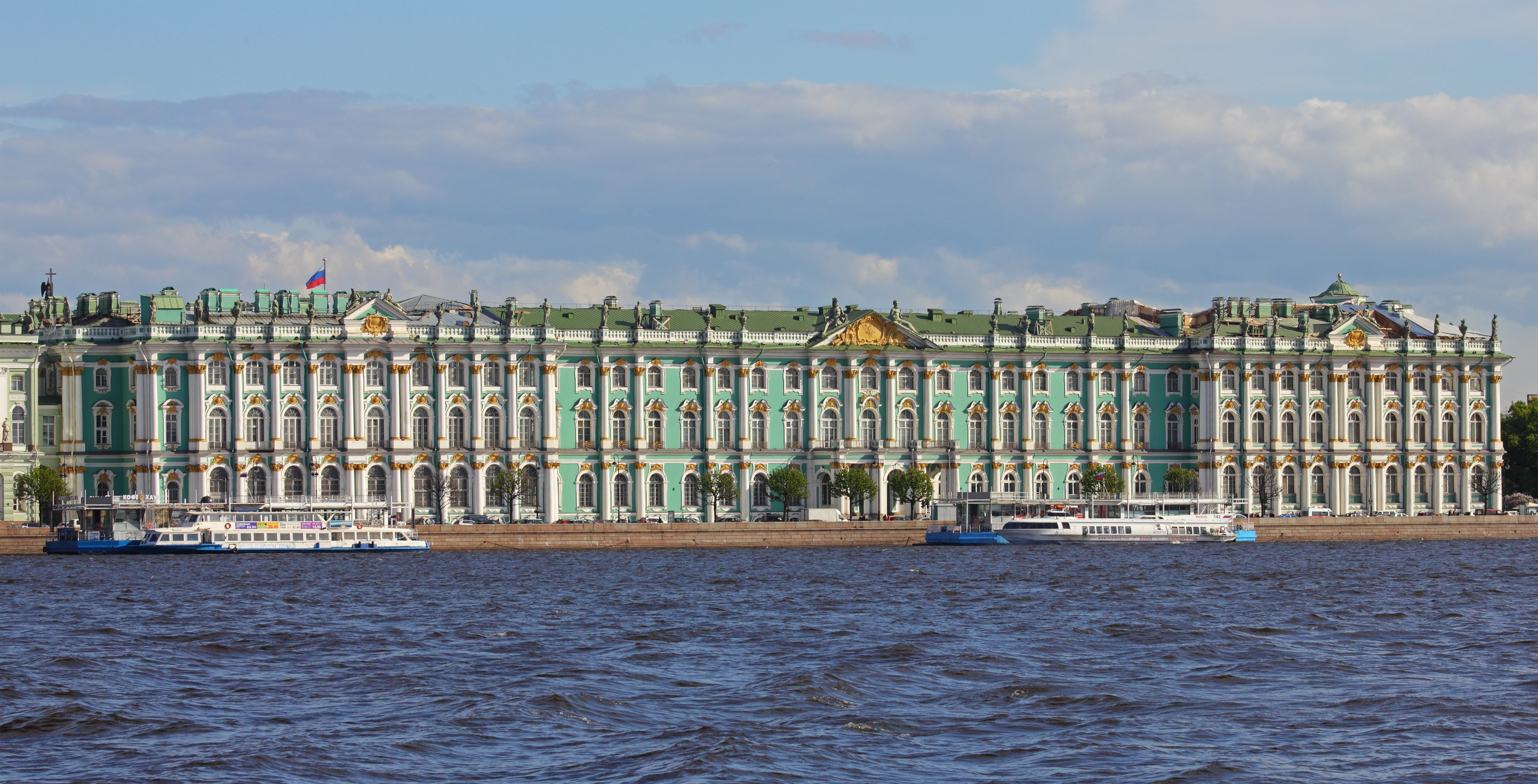
The Winter Palace, Saint Petersburg

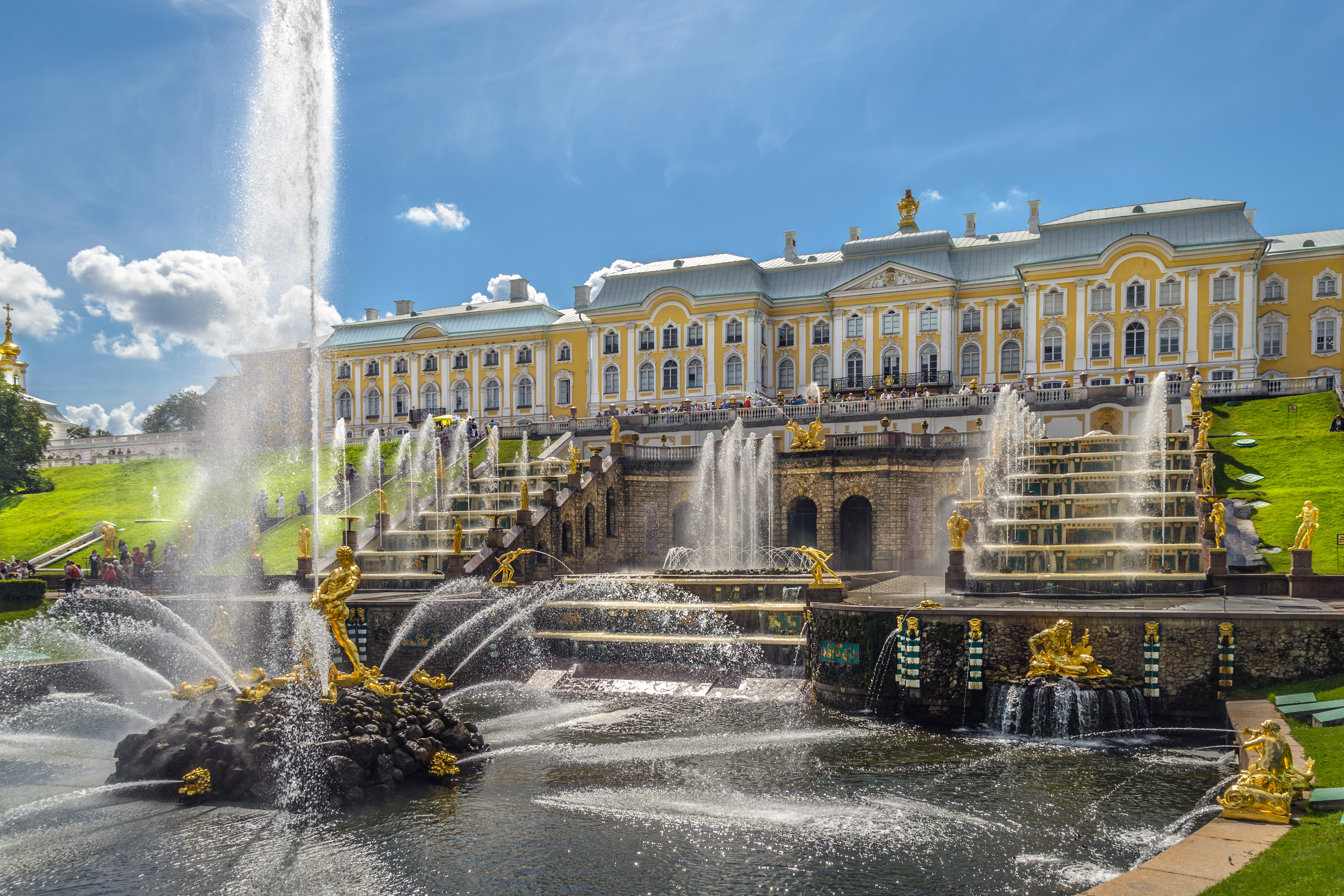
The Peterhof Palace, Saint Petersburg

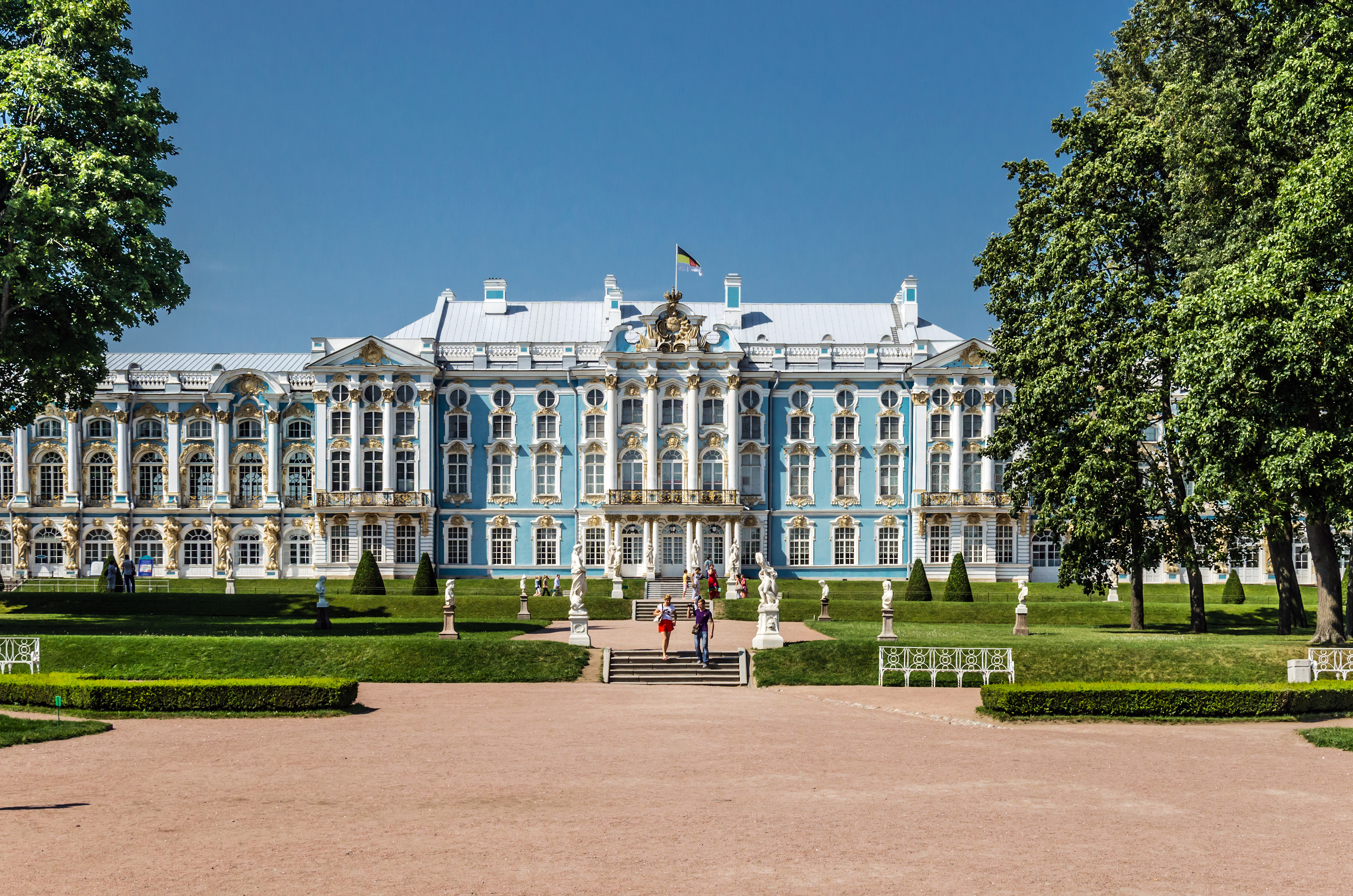
The Catherine Palace, Tsarskoye Selo

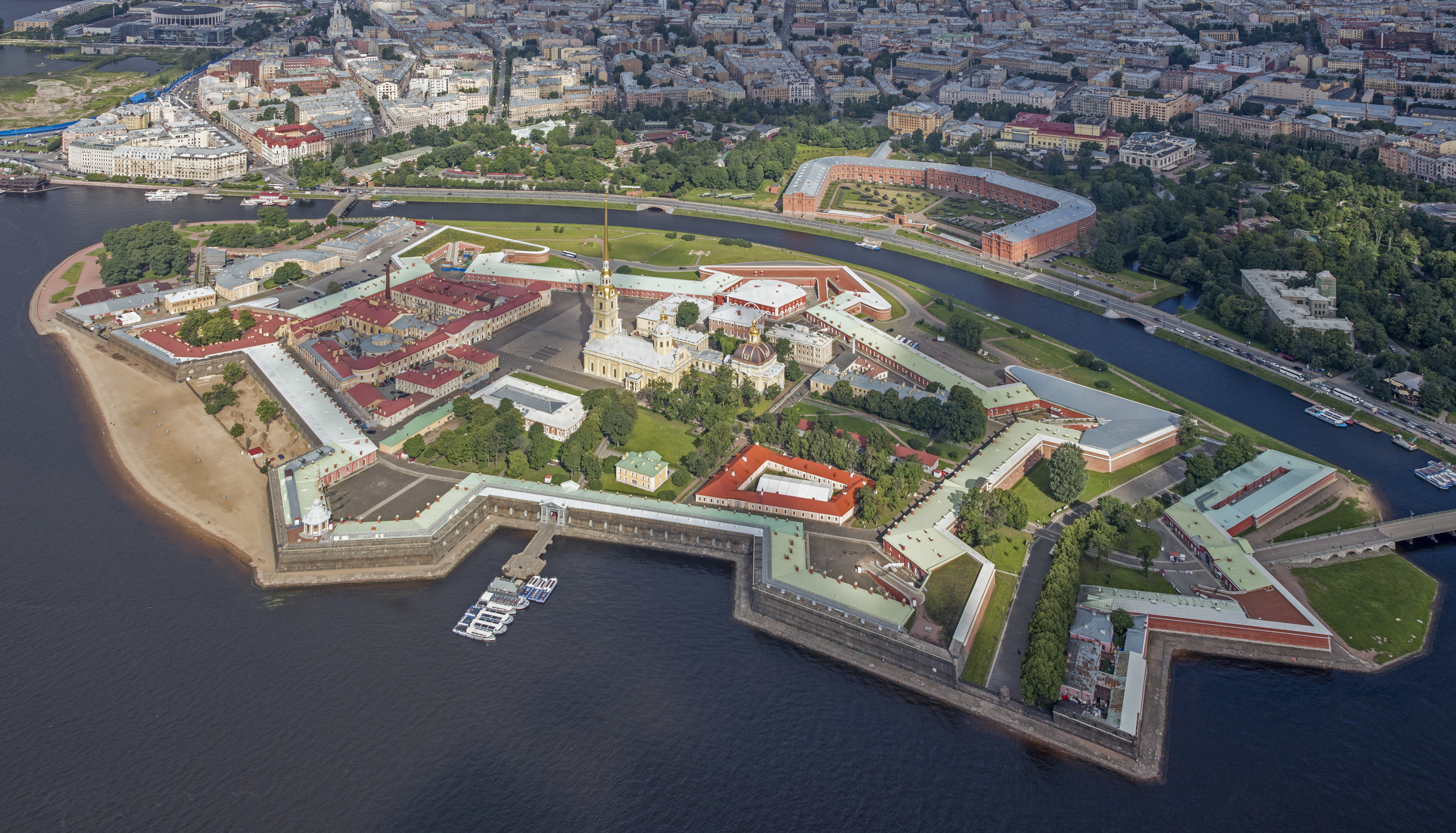
Aerial view of the Peter and Paul Fortress with Peter and Paul Cathedral, mausoleum of the Romanovs

== See also ==
- Romanov impostors
- List of monarchs of Russia
- List of grand duchesses of Russia
- List of grand dukes of Russia
- List of films about the Romanovs
- The Romanovs Collect: European Art from the Hermitage (exhibition)

== Notes ==
— Royal house — House of Romanov Founding year: 15th century
| Preceded by House of Vasa | Tsardom of Russia; 1613–1721 | Tsardom elevated Became Russian Empire |
| New title | Russian Empire; 1721–1917 | Empire abolished |
| Preceded by House of Poniatowski (elect) | Kingdom of Poland; 1815–1917 | Kingdom abolished |
| Preceded by House of Poniatowski (elect) | Grand Principality of Lithuania; 1795–1917 | Grand Principality abolished |
| Preceded by House of Holstein-Gottorp | Duchy of Holstein-Gottorp; 1739–1773 | Succeeded by House of Oldenburg |
| Preceded by House of Oldenburg | Duchy of Oldenburg; 1773–1774 | Succeeded by House of Holstein-Gottorp |
| Preceded by Grand Masters | Sovereign Military Order of Malta; 1798–1803 | Succeeded by Grand Masters |
| Preceded by House of Holstein-Gottorp (Swedish line) | Grand Duchy of Finland; 1809–1917 | Grand Duchy abolished |
