= Vasily of Moscow =

May refer to the following grand princes of Moscow:

- Vasily I of Moscow (1371–1425)
- Vasily II of Moscow (1415–1462)
- Vasily III of Moscow (1479–1533)
