= 1483 =

1483 in various calendars
- Gregorian calendar: 1483; MCDLXXXIII
- Ab urbe condita: 2236
- Armenian calendar: 932; ԹՎ ՋԼԲ
- Assyrian calendar: 6233
- Balinese saka calendar: 1404–1405
- Bengali calendar: 889–890
- Berber calendar: 2433
- English Regnal year: 22 Edw. 4 – 1 Ric. 3
- Buddhist calendar: 2027
- Burmese calendar: 845
- Byzantine calendar: 6991–6992
- Chinese calendar: 壬寅年 (Water Tiger); 4180 or 3973 — to — 癸卯年 (Water Rabbit); 4181 or 3974
- Coptic calendar: 1199–1200
- Discordian calendar: 2649
- Ethiopian calendar: 1475–1476
- Hebrew calendar: 5243–5244
- Hindu calendars
- Vikram Samvat: 1539–1540
- Shaka Samvat: 1404–1405
- Kali Yuga: 4583–4584
- Holocene calendar: 11483
- Igbo calendar: 483–484
- Iranian calendar: 861–862
- Islamic calendar: 887–888
- Japanese calendar: Bunmei 15 (文明１５年)
- Javanese calendar: 1399–1400
- Julian calendar: 1483; MCDLXXXIII
- Korean calendar: 3816
- Minguo calendar: 429 before ROC 民前429年
- Nanakshahi calendar: 15
- Thai solar calendar: 2025–2026
- Tibetan calendar: ཆུ་ཕོ་སྟག་ལོ་ (male Water-Tiger); 1609 or 1228 or 456 — to — ཆུ་མོ་ཡོས་ལོ་ (female Water-Hare); 1610 or 1229 or 457

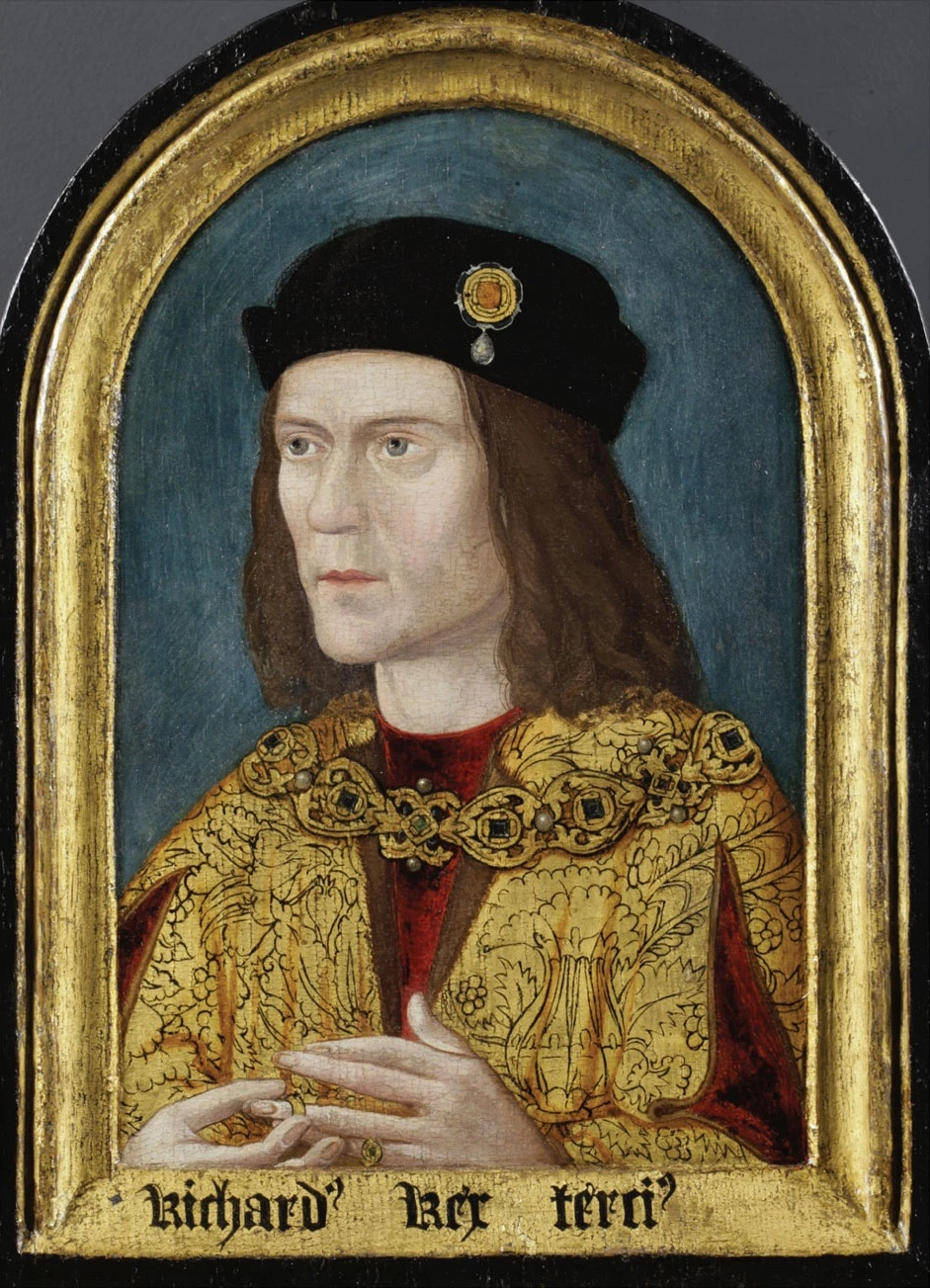
June 25: Richard, Duke of Gloucester, deposes his nephew, King Edward V and imprisons Edward and his brother

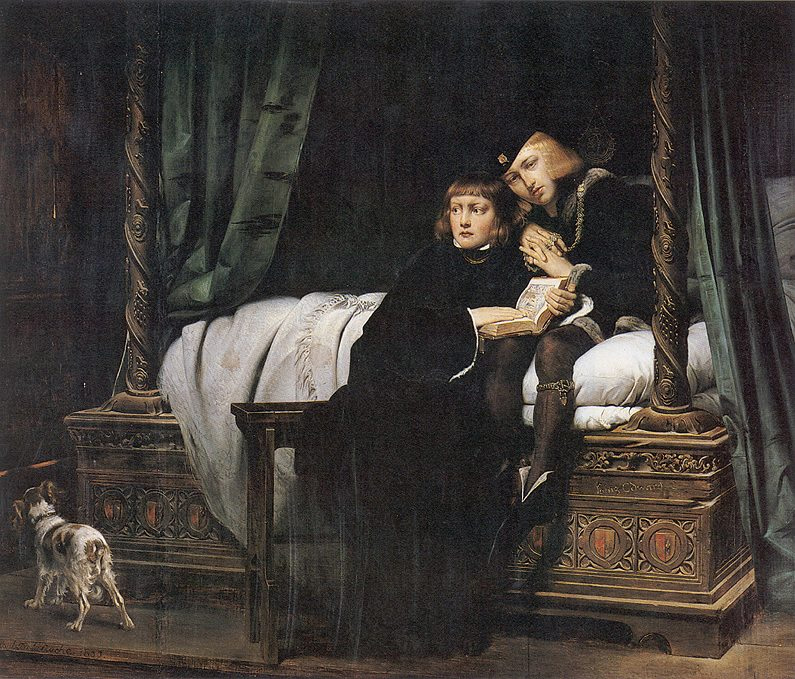
The Princes in the Tower, Edward V and his younger brother, Richard, Duke of York, imprisoned in the Tower of London, disappear and are murdered on orders of their uncle.

Year 1483 (MCDLXXXIII) was a common year starting on Wednesday of the Julian calendar.

== Events ==
=== January–March ===
- January 7 –
  - At Pau (now part of France), Queen Catalina becomes the new ruler of Navarre at the age of 14, upon the death of her older brother, the 15-year-old King Francisco Febo. Their mother, Magdalena of Valois, continues as regent of Navarre.
  - Ivan IV becomes the new Grand Prince of the semi-independent Principality of Ryazan upon the death of his father, Vasily Ivanovich of Ryazan.
- January 8 – Following the appointment of the Duke of Albany as Lieutenant-General of the Realm, King James III of Scotland is restored to the throne after having been captured in battle on July 22, 1482.
- January 20 – The English Parliament, summoned by King Edward IV on November 15, assembles at Westminster.
- January – Upon the petition the Grand Inquistitor of Castile (now part of Spain) Tomás de Torquemada, the Jews are expelled from the Castilian-controlled portions of Andalusia.
- February 11 – The General Council of the Inquisition is created in Spain.
- February 18 – King Edward IV gives royal assent to numerous acts passed by the English Parliament.
- March 20 – In what is now the Kingdom of Spain, the Islamic Emirate of Granada defeats the Christian Crown of Castile in the Battle of Axarquía, despite the Castilians having four times as many troops as the Granadans.

=== April–June ===
- April 9 – At the age of 12, Edward V becomes King of England upon the sudden death of his father, King Edward IV. The young king will reign for only 78 days before being deposed, imprisoned and murdered by his uncle, Richard III.
- April 29 – Gran Canaria, the main island of the Canary Islands, is conquered by the Kingdom of Castile, a very important step in the expansion of Spain. Of 4,000 Castilian troops, 800 are killed and 1,600 others are taken as prisoners of war.
- April 30 – Pluto moves inside Neptune's orbit until July 23, 1503, according to modern orbital calculations. At the time, neither planet has been discovered by Earth astronomers. The event of Pluto being closer to the Sun than Neptune will happen again during the period lasting from 1979 to 1999.
- May 18 – The coronation of Hans of Oldenburg as King of Denmark takes place at the Church of Our Lady in Copenhagen.
- May 19 – King Edward V moves into the Tower of London, the traditional residence of monarchs prior to a coronation. King Edward's coronation had recently been rescheduled for June 25.
- June 9 – The Grand Duke Ivan IV of Ryazan signs a treaty with his uncle, Grand Duke Ivan III of Moscow, placing Ryazan under Moscow's control and ending Ryazan's independence.
- June 13 – William Hastings, 1st Baron Hastings, is executed, in the first recorded execution at the Tower of London.
- June 16 – Richard, Duke of York, the younger brother of King Edward V, arrives at the Tower of London.
- June 20 – The powerful Duke Fernando II of Braganza is executed in Portugal, followed by more than 80 other noblemen, for his plot against the royal crown.
- June 25 – On the day of his scheduled coronation, 12-year-old King Edward V is deposed by his uncle, Richard, Duke of Gloucester, who is acclaimed by the English Parliament as King Richard III.

=== July–September ===
- July 6 – Richard III and Anne Neville are crowned king and Queen of England, at Westminster Abbey.
- July 20 – The coronation of Hans, King of Denmark as crowned King of Norway is held at Nidaros Cathedral in Trondheim.
- August 15 – The Sistine Chapel opens in the Apostolic Palace in Rome.
- August 30 – Charles VIII becomes the new King of France upon the death of his father, Louis XI.
- September 3 – The Princes in the Tower, uncrowned 12-year-old Edward V, recently deposed as King of England, is murdered in the Tower of London along with his 10-year-old brother, Richard of Shrewsbury, Duke of York, on the orders of their uncle, King Richard III.
- September 8 – Edward of Middleham, the 7-year-old son of King Richard III of England, is given the title of Prince of Wales and designated the heir apparent to the throne. However, Edward will die less than a year later on April 9.
- September 14 – Archduke Maximilian of Austria, father of the four-year old Philip the Handsome, Duke of the Burgundian Netherlands, declares the abolition of the Regency Council that had administered the land in Philip's name after the death of Mary of Burgundy on March 27, 1482; Maximilian becomes the sole regent.

=== October–December ===
- October 10 – In England, a rebellion is started by Duke of Buckingham, against King Richard III. Fighting between the supporters of King Richard and of the late King Edward IV lasts for more than six weeks.
- October 29 – Battle of Una: Forces of the Kingdom of Croatia defeat the army of the Ottoman Empire.
- November 25 – Buckingham's rebellion comes to an end and most of the conspirators disperse to plan for another uprising.
- December 25 – At Rennes Cathedral in France, Henry Tudor, Earl of Richmond, leader of the House of Lancaster after Richard III of England of the House of York had seized the throne, pledges to marry Elizabeth of York, the eldest daughter the late King Edward IV, in order to strengthen his support for the overthrow of King Richard.
- December 27 – (27th day of 11th month of Bunmei 14) The Ashikaga shogunate and Koga kubo Ashikaga Shigeuji agree to the Tohiwaboku peace treaty, ending the Kyotoku War after almost 29 years. that had been ongoing since 1455.

=== Date unknown ===
- Isaac Abravanel flees Portugal, after being implicated in a plot against the king.
- The Prince of Moscow builds the fortress of Ivangorod, facing Narva.
- Giovanni Bellini is named official painter of the Republic of Venice.
- Flavio Biondo publishes his Historiarum ab inclinatione romanorum imperii.

== Births ==
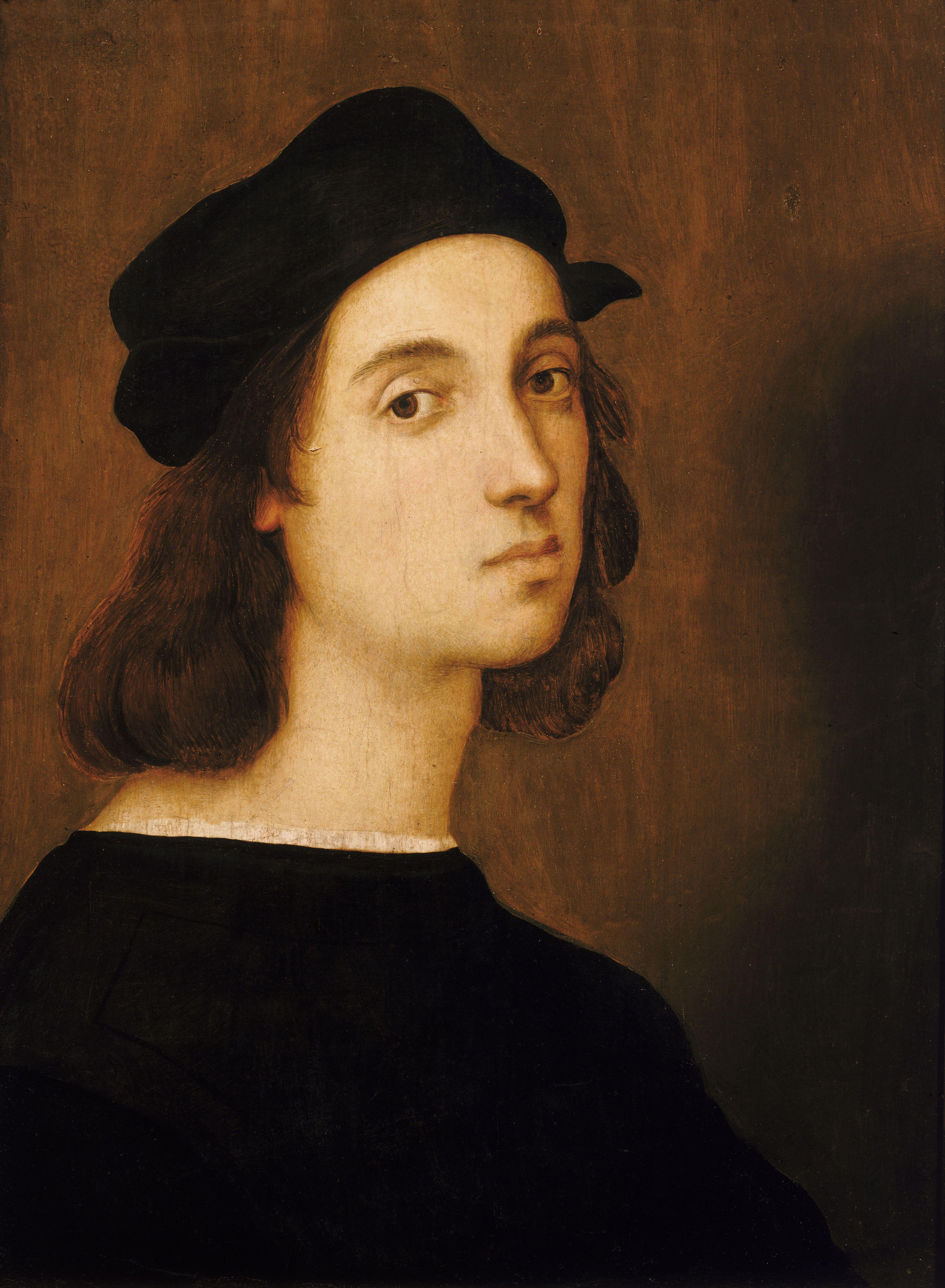
Raphael

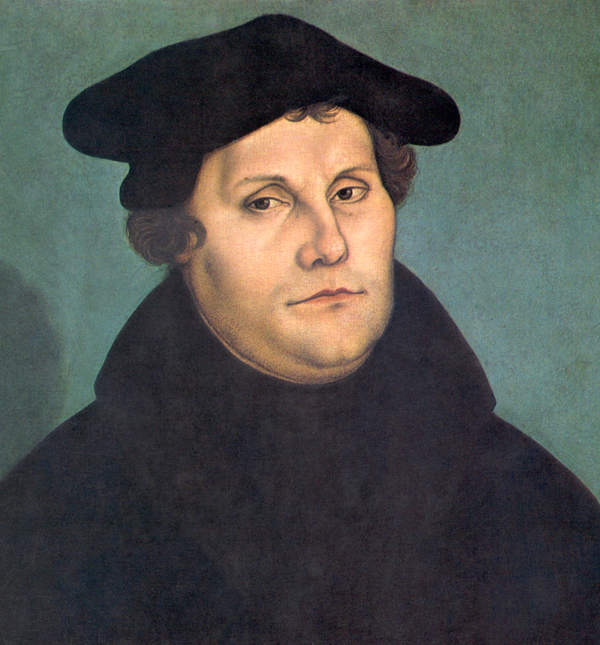
Martin Luther

- January 12 – Henry III of Nassau-Breda, Baron of Breda (d. 1538)
- February 14 – Zahir al-Din Mohammed Babur Shah, founder of the Moghul Dynasty (d. 1530)
- March 6 – Francesco Guicciardini, Italian historian and statesman (d. 1540)
- April 6 – Raphael, Italian painter and architect (d. 1520)
- April 19 – Paolo Giovio, Italian bishop (d. 1552)
- July 20 – Wang Gen, Chinese philosopher (d. 1541)
- September 3 – Eric II, Duke of Mecklenburg (d. 1508)
- October 16 – Gasparo Contarini, Italian diplomat and cardinal (d. 1542)
- October 26 – Hans Buchner, German Renaissance composer (d. 1538)
- November 10 – Martin Luther, German monk and Protestant reformer (d. 1546)
- November 16 – Elisabeth of the Palatinate, Landgravine of Hesse, German noble (d. 1522)
- December 3 – Nicolaus von Amsdorf, German theologian and Protestant reformer (d. 1565)
- date unknown
  - Thomas Parr, Englishman, alleged oldest living man (d. 1635)
  - Cacamatzin, Aztec ruler (d. 1520)
  - Jacquet of Mantua, French composer (d. 1559)
  - Chen Chun, Chinese painter (d. 1544)
  - Felice della Rovere, also known as Madonna Felice, the illegitimate daughter of Pope Julius II (d. 1536)
  - Andrea Navagero, Venetian diplomat and writer (d. 1529)

== Deaths ==
- January 19 – William IV, Lord of Egmont, IJsselstein, Schoonderwoerd and Haastrecht and Stadtholder of Guelders (b. 1412)
- February 27 – William VIII of Montferrat (b. 1420)
- March 23 – Yolande, Duchess of Lorraine (b. 1428)
- April 4 – Henry Bourchier, 1st Earl of Essex (b. c. 1405)
- April 9 – King Edward IV of England (b. 1442)
- April 24 – Margaret of Bourbon, French noble (b. 1438)
- May 4 – George Neville, Duke of Bedford, English dispossessed nobleman (b. 1465)
- May 6 – Queen Jeonghui, Korean regent (b. 1418)
- June 13 – William Hastings, 1st Baron Hastings (executed; b. 1431)
- June 25
  - Anthony Woodville, 2nd Earl Rivers (executed; b. 1442)
  - Richard Grey, English knight, half brother of Edward V (executed; b. 1457)
- July 4 – Costanzo I Sforza, Italian condottiero (b. 1447)
- August 30 – King Louis XI of France (b. 1423)
- November 2 – Henry Stafford, 2nd Duke of Buckingham, English politician (b. 1454)
- December 1 – Charlotte of Savoy, French queen (b. 1441)
- date unknown
  - Edmund Sutton, English nobleman (b. 1425)
  - Elise Eskilsdotter, Norwegian noblewoman and pirate
  - Edward V, King of England (b. 1470)
