= Vasily Ivanovich of Ryazan =

Grand Prince of Ryazan
- Reign: 1456 – 7 January 1483
- Predecessor: Grand Prince Ivan III of Ryazan
- Successor: Grand Prince Ivan IV of Ryazan
- Regent: Vasily II of Moscow
- Born: 1448
- Died: 7 January 1483 (aged 34–35)
- Spouse: Grand Princess Anna of Ryazan
- Issue: Ivan IV of Ryazan; Fyodor; Pyotr; Anna
- House: House of Ryazan, Sviatoslavichi
- Father: Grand Prince Ivan III of Ryazan
- Mother: Anna
- Religion: Eastern Orthodoxy

Vasily Ivanovich (Russian: Василий Иванович) (1448 – 7 January 1483) was the Grand Prince of Ryazan (1456–1483), son of Grand Prince Ivan III of Ryazan.

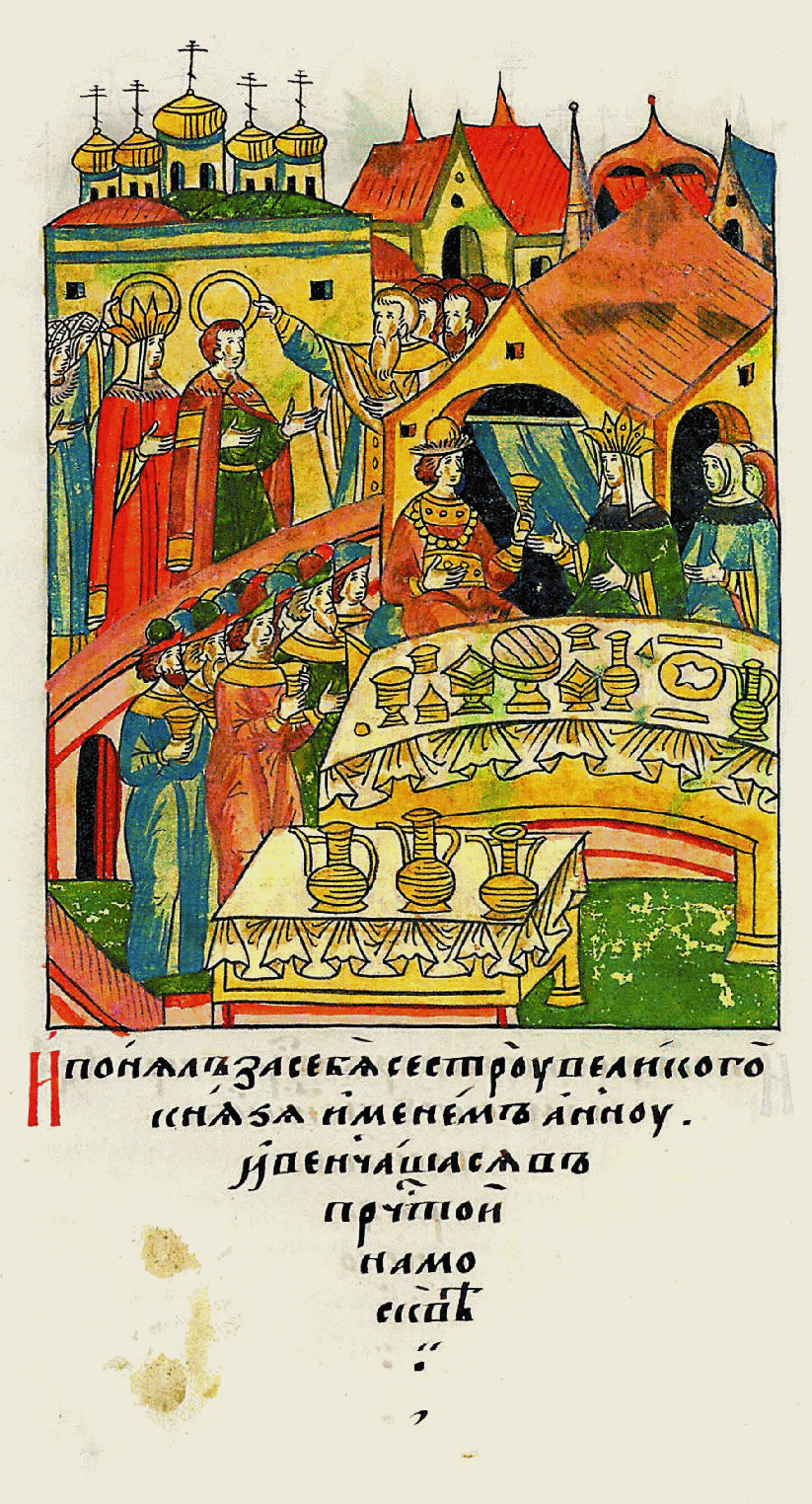
The wedding of Anna and Vasily (Illustration from the Chronicle of the 16th Century)

Upon their father's death in 1456, eight-year-old Vasily Ivanovich and his sister Feodosiya were transferred under the care of the Grand Prince Vasily II of Moscow, who would place his namestniks in Ryazan to rule over the principality in the absence of the rightful heirs. Vasily II conducted all of Ryazan's internal and external affairs on behalf of the underage Vasily Ivanovich. In 1463, Ivan III of Russia and his mother Maria Yaroslavna let Vasily Ivanovich return to Ryazan. In the winter of that same year, the young prince came back to Moscow and married the youngest sister of Ivan III – Anna Vasilyevna – on 28 January 1464.

As far as Vasily Ivanovich's lasting reign is concerned, Ryazan's relations with its neighbors were quite peaceful, especially with Moscow (thanks to his wife Anna Vasilyevna, who often stayed the city). During one of such visits, Anna of Ryazan gave birth to Ivan IV of Ryazan on 14 April 1467. It is plausible that the inclusion of the Pronsk udel into the Principality of Ryazan was possible due to Anna's mediation between her husband and Ivan III.

Shortly before his death, Vasily Ivanovich signed away two-thirds of his principality (Pereslavl, Rostislavl, Pronsk, and all the volosts and residences) in favor of his oldest son Ivan Vasilyevich. His second son Fyodor received a third of the principality and a third of all Pereslavl's income. Vasily Ivanovich bequeathed to his wife Anna a fourth of all the lands that his sons received from him.

It is believed that Vasily Ivanovich also had a third son by the name of Pyotr (born in 1468 and died during Vasily's lifetime) and a daughter named Anna, who would marry Prince Fyodor Ivanovich Belsky in January 1498.
