= Ascension Convent =

Monastery in Moscow

Coordinates: 55°45′9″N 37°37′13″E

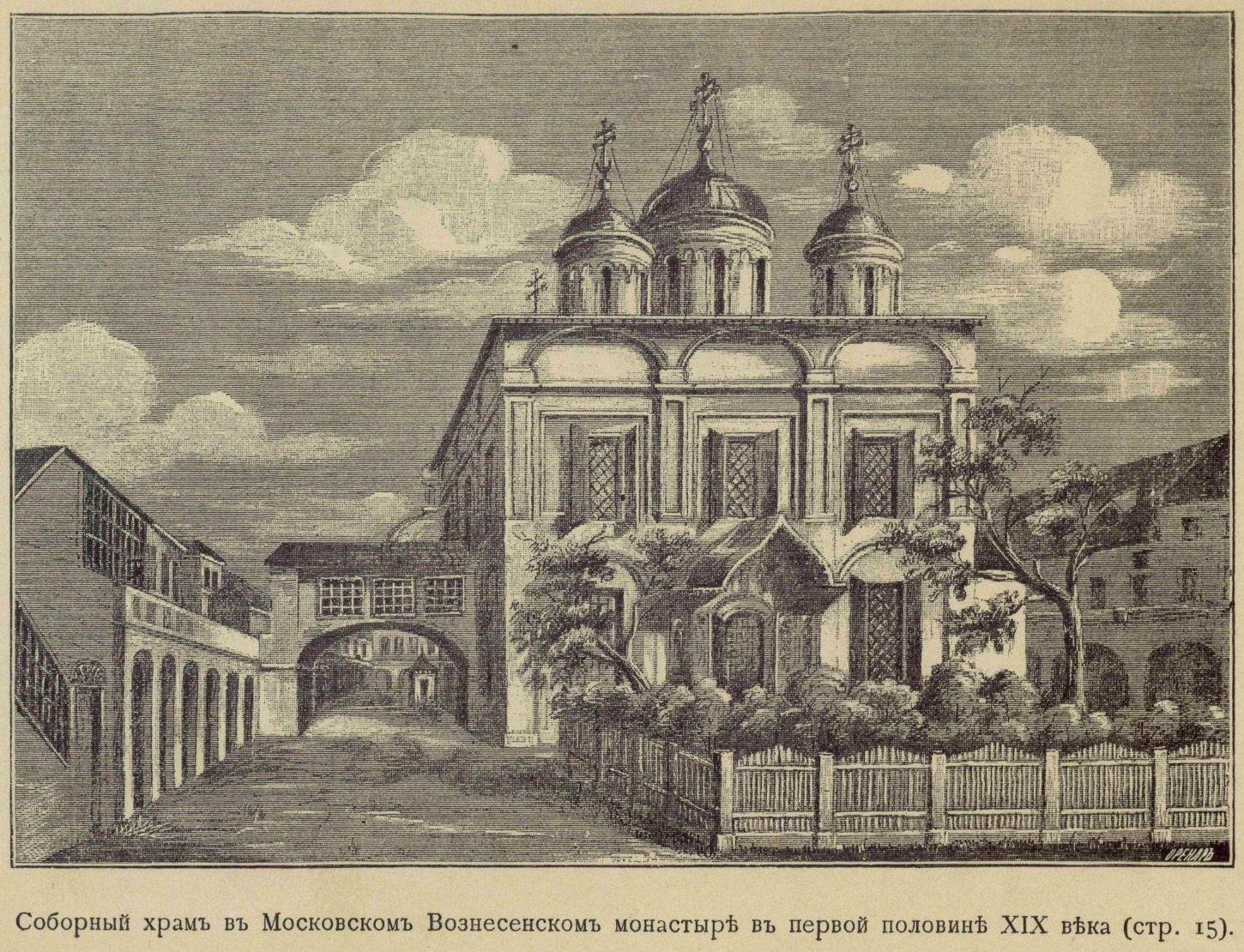
Katholikon of Ascension Convent (1580s), from an early 19th-century drawing.

Ascension Convent, known as the Starodevichy Convent or Old Maidens' Convent until 1817 (Russian: Вознесенский монастырь, romanized: Voznesensky monastyr), was a Russian Orthodox nunnery in the Moscow Kremlin which contained the burials of grand princesses, tsarinas, and other noble ladies from the Muscovite royal court. It was destroyed in 1929 on the orders of Joseph Stalin.

== History ==
It is believed that Ascension Convent was founded in 1389 next to the Saviour Gates of the Kremlin by Dmitry Donskoy's widow, Eudoxia Dmitriyevna, who would take the veil there. The foundation stone for the cathedral was laid in 1407, just before her death. Eight years later, the cathedral was gutted by fire and then rebuilt in 1467 by princess Maria of Borovsk, wife of Vasili II of Russia.

Sixteen years later the convent was again damaged by fire and then restored in 1518–1519 to a design by Aloisio the New. This church was completely rebuilt in 1587–1588, when a new five-domed structure, mirroring the nearby Archangel Cathedral, was erected. It was a major monument to embody the conservative architectural approach of Boris Godunov's circle (illustrated, to the right).

Among those buried in the cathedral vault were Sophia Vitovtovna (wife of Vasili I), Sophia Paleologue (wife of Ivan III), several wives of Ivan the Terrible, Grand Duchess Eudoxia Alexeyevna (daughter of Alexei Mikhailovich), and tsarina Maria Vladimirovna (first wife of Mikhail Feodorovich).

The convent was also used as a residence for royal fiancees prior to the wedding. It was there that Ivan IV's widow, Maria Nagaya, greeted Marina Mnishek, who would spend there a few days before her wedding with Nagaya's purported son, False Dmitry I. In 1634, Michael I of Russia commissioned a new convent church to be built and dedicated to his patron saint, Michael Maleinos. A belltower next to this church was constructed in the late 17th century. The Church of Michael Maleinos used to be home to a rare sculpture of St George, made by Vasili Yermolin and installed there in 1808.

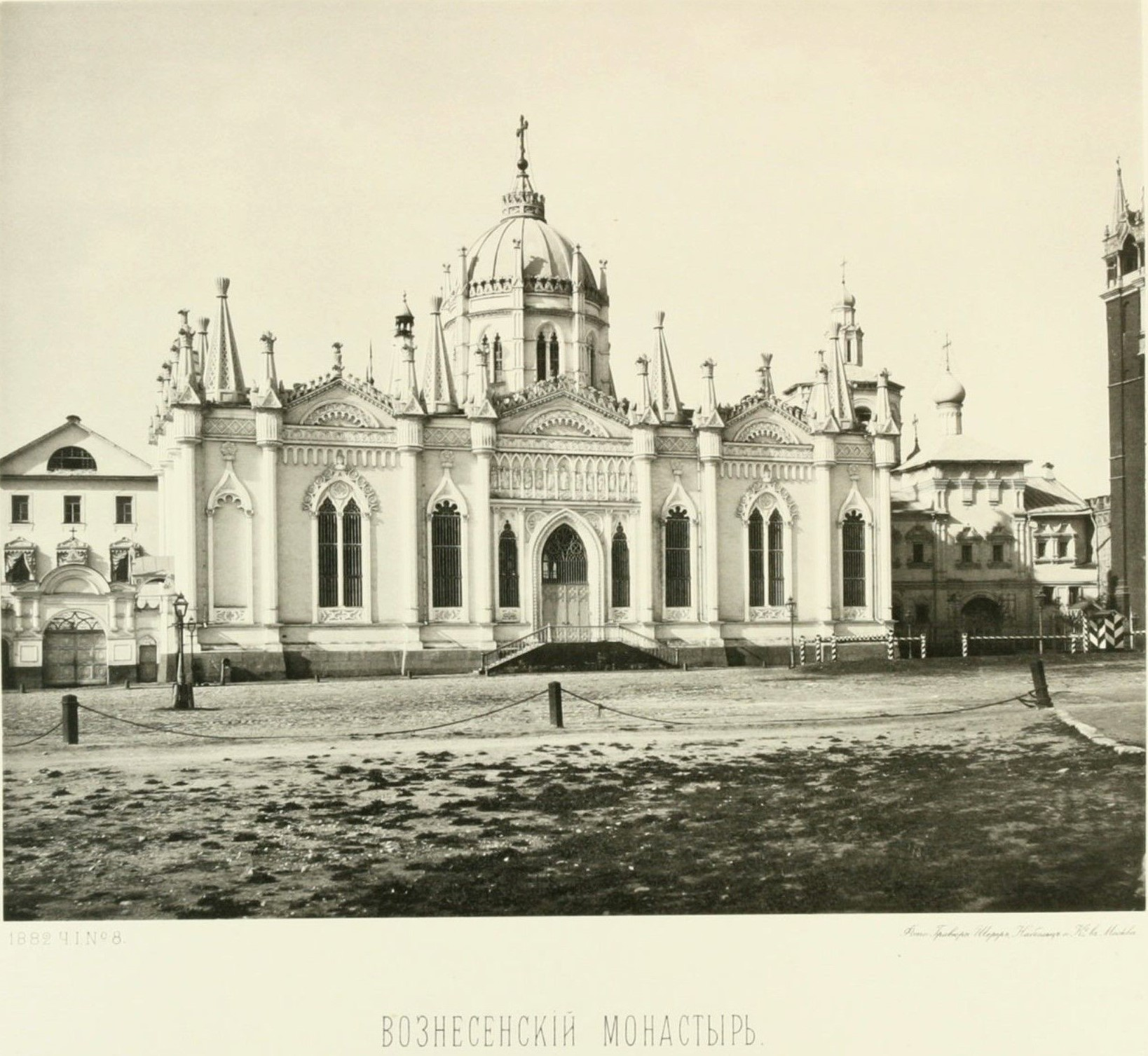
St Catherine Church of Ascension Convent.

In 1721, the convent was renovated on behest of Peter the Great. In 1737, it was damaged by fire and again renovated by the order of Anna Ioannovna. During the Patriotic War of 1812, the sacristy of Ascension Convent, with the Icon of the Virgin Hodegetria, painted by Dionisius in 1482, was moved to Vologda. A two-storey almshouse was added in 1823. But the most important 19th-century addition was the Church of Saint Catherine, built to a fanciful Neo-Gothic design by Carlo Rossi (illustrated, to the right).

By 1907, the monastery had a mother superior, 62 nuns and 45 lay sisters. Ten years later, the ancient buildings were damaged by Bolshevik artillery fire during the October Revolution. In 1929, the convent complex – including the majestic 16th-century cathedral – was torn down by the Soviet government in order to make room for a military school, named after the All-Russian Central Executive Committee.

Some of the icons of Ascension Convent were moved to the State Tretyakov Gallery and State museums of the Moscow Kremlin. The iconostasis of the Ascension Cathedral was moved into the Cathedral of Twelve Apostles (also in the Kremlin), while the tombs of the Muscovite royalty were transferred into an annex of the Archangel Cathedral, where they reside to this day.

== Contemporary development of the area ==
In the 1990s, work began on the study of the tombs of grand duchesses and tsars. It was possible to find relics of Eudoxia of Moscow and to restore a sculptural portrait of Sofia Palaiologina from the skull.

In 2004, research on burial in the underground chamber near the Archangel cathedral has passed. The further studying of materials passed in laboratory premises.

In 2016, the Kremlin Presidium was dismantled and archaeological excavations were carried out at the opened site. For the first time, opportunities for the large-scale archaeological study of such a vast section of the Kremlin Hill and the hidden layers of the cultural and spiritual heritage of the XII – early XX centuries were opened. Researches were carried out by the Institute of the Archaeology of the Russian Academy of Sciences. In May of the same year, upon completion of the excavation, a park was laid out.

In the Archangel Cathedral, the Moscow Kremlin Museums opened a permanent exhibition dedicated to the history of the Ascension Monastery, a new tourist route introducing Muscovites and visitors to the capital to the history of the ruined shrines.

In August 2014, Russian president Vladimir Putin suggested an idea for restoring Ascension Convent and Chudov Monastery, which were demolished by the Soviet regime in the 1930s. However, due to archaeological work which began in December 2015 and the lack of UNESCO's approval of the restoration, the restoration of Ascension Convent is currently unplanned. During archaeological work, experts have managed to find a foundation of Chudov Monastery and Ascension Convent.
