= Vasilyevich =

Vasilyevich is a name. People associated with the name include:

== Surname ==
- Ivan IV Vasilyevich
- Ivan III Vasilyevich
- Ivan Vasilyevich (disambiguation)

== Middle name ==
- Sergei Vasilyevich Rachmaninoff
- Nikolay Vasilyevich Gogol
- Valery Vasilyevich Gerasimov
- Alexander Vasilyevich Alexandrov
- Alexander Vasilyevich Suvorov
- Vasily Vasilyevich Kandinsky
- Vasily Vasilyevich Vereshchagin
- Mikhail Vasilyevich Lomonosov
- Anatoli Vasilyevich Lunacharsky
- Igor Vasilyevich Kurchatov
- Valentin Vasilyevich Bondarenko
- Mikhail Vasilyevich Frunze
- Aleksandr Vasilyevich Samsonov
- Alexander Vasilyevich Bortnikov
