= Sophia of Lithuania =

Grand Princess of Moscow from 1391 to 1425

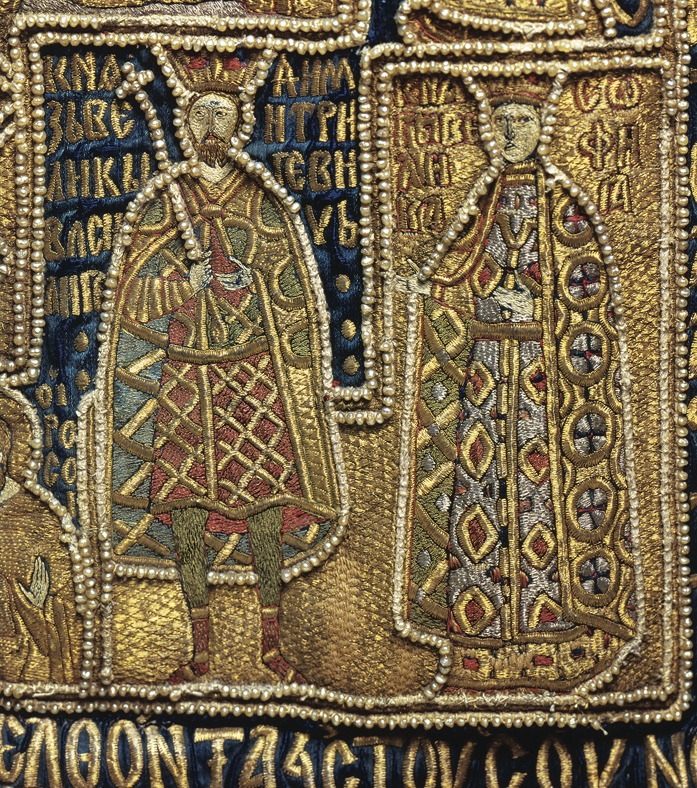
- Vasily I and Sophia on the Large Sakkos of Photius, 1410s

Regent of Moscow
- Regency: 1425–1432
- Monarch: Vasily II

Grand Princess consort of Moscow
- Tenure: 1391–1425
- Predecessor: Eudoxia of Moscow
- Successor: Maria of Borovsk
- Born: 1371
- Died: 1453 (aged 81–82)
- Burial: Cathedral of the Archangel; Ascension Convent (until 1929)
- Spouse: Vasily I
- Issue More…: Anna, Byzantine Empress; Vasily II of Moscow
- House: Kęstutis
- Father: Vytautas
- Mother: Anna
- Religion: Russian Orthodox prev. Roman Catholic

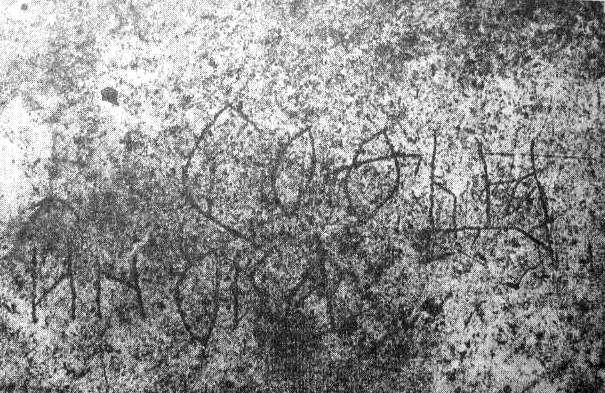
Sophia of Lithuania's grave inscription.

Sophia (Note: Also spelled as Sofia or Sofiia.) Vitovtovna of Lithuania (Lithuanian: Sofija Vytautaitė; Russian: Софья Витовтовна, romanized: Sofya Vitovtovna; 1371–1453) was the grand princess of Moscow as the wife of Vasily I from 1391 to 1425. She was regent for her son Vasily II from 1425 to 1432. Her father was Vytautas, the grand duke of Lithuania.

== Life ==
Sophia Vitovtovna was born in 1371. She the daughter of Vytautas (Vitovt) of Lithuania and his first wife, Anna. In December 1390, she was sent by her father to Moscow to wed Vasily I, intending to strengthen relations between the two states, with the Grand Principality of Moscow viewed as the junior partner. On 9 January 1391, while her father was engaged in the Lithuanian Civil War, the marriage took place. Metropolitan Cyprian's first recorded act in Moscow after being reinstated as the Russian metropolitan was to officiate the marriage. According to John Meyendorff, Cyprian "prepared an alliance between [Vitovt] and the grand principality of Moscow", resulting in the marriage. She was the longest-serving consort of Russia.

Instead of representing her father's policy, Sophia was a loyal adviser to Vasily I. After her husband's death in 1425, she received extensive landed estates. She also became regent for their ten-year-old son, Vasily II, and she called on the nobles to support her son. After requesting help from her father, Vytautas supported Vasily II's claim to the throne, which was disputed by his uncle, Yury of Zvenigorod. As a result, Yury was forced to recognize Vasily II as grand prince. In the late 1420s, she promulgated a new law code, whose preamble stated: "and so Grand Princess Sofia decreed."

By the 1430s, the political situation in Moscow had worsened after her father died and was succeeded by Švitrigaila, the brother-in-law of Yury of Zvenigorod, who decided to cut ties with Vasily II and request that the khan of the Golden Horde grant him the patent (yarlyk) to the throne. Sophia sent a noble to the khan, and, after being bribed, he agreed to continue recognizing Vasily II as grand prince. Despite this, Yury and his sons did not give up on their claims to the throne. During the marriage ceremony of Vasily II to Maria of Borovsk in February 1433, Yury's son Vasily wore a golden belt, which belonged to the regalia of the grand princes of Moscow. Sophia tore the belt off, seeing it as belonging to her son, and the resulting scandal was used as a pretext for war.

During the civil war, Sophia was exiled to Chukhloma for ten years. In the late 1440s, Vasily II gained the support of Muscovite nobles, and Sophia was able to return to Moscow. Until her death, she continued to manage the affairs of her estates and founded several new monasteries and churches. She also shaped the character of her daughter-in-law, Maria, who played an important role during the reign of Ivan III, during which the "Tatar yoke" over Russia ended and Moscow became the center of the Russian state.

She died in 1453. Sophia was buried in the Ascension Convent; the sarcophagus was moved in 1929 to the Cathedral of the Archangel by Soviet authorities.

== Issue ==
She and Vasily I had at least nine children, five boys (of which only one survived to mature adulthood) and four girls:

- Anna Vasilyevna (1393 – August 1417), wife of John VIII Palaiologos, died of bubonic plague;
- Yury Vasilyevich (30 March 1395 – 30 November 1400);
- Ivan Vasilyevich (15 January 1396 or 1397 – 20 July 1417), died on the way from Kolomna to Moscow as a result of "pestilence", just six months after marrying the daughter of Ivan Vladimirovich of Pronsk and receiving the inheritance of Nizhny Novgorod;
- Anastasia Vasilyevna (d. 1470), wife of Vladimir Alexander, prince of Kiev;
- Daniil Vasilyevich (6 December 1400 – May 1402), died of pestilence;
- Vasilisa Vasilyevna, wife of Alexander Ivanovich "Brukhaty", prince of Suzdal;
- Simeon Vasilyevich (13 January – 7 April 1405), died of pestilence;
- Maria Vasilyevna, wife of Yuri Patrikievich, son of Patrikas;
- Vasily Vasilyevich (10 March 1415 – 27 March 1462), grand prince of Vladimir and Moscow.

== Sources ==
- "София Витовтовна" . Brockhaus and Efron Encyclopedic Dictionary (in Russian). 1906.
- Feldbrugge, Ferdinand J. M. (2 October 2017). A History of Russian Law: From Ancient Times to the Council Code (Ulozhenie) of Tsar Aleksei Mikhailovich of 1649. BRILL. ISBN 978-90-04-35214-8.
- Fennell, John L. I. (14 January 2014) [1995]. A History of the Russian Church to 1488. Routledge. ISBN 978-1-317-89720-0.
- Pushkareva, Natalia (3 March 1997). Women in Russian History: From the Tenth to the Twentieth Century. M.E. Sharpe. ISBN 978-0-7656-3270-8.

Sophia of Lithuania Gediminids Born: c. 1371 Died: 1453
Russian royalty
| Vacant Title last held by Eudoxia of Moscow | Grand Princess of Moscow; 1391–1425 | Vacant Title next held by Maria of Borovsk |
