= Grand Prince of Moscow =

Monarch during a period of Russian history

The Grand Prince of Moscow (Russian: великий князь Московский, romanized: velikiy knyaz Moskovskiy), known as the Prince of Moscow (Note: Russian: князь Московский, romanized: knyaz Moskovskiy.) until 1389, was the ruler of the Grand Principality of Moscow. The Moscow principality was initially established in the 13th century as an appanage within the Vladimir-Suzdal grand principality. By the late 14th century, the grand principality became a family possession of the princes of Moscow; the monarch bore the title of grand prince of Vladimir and Moscow and later the title of grand prince of Vladimir, Moscow and all Russia.

== History ==
The grand principality of Vladimir-Suzdal fell apart into feuding appanages over the course of the 13th century. The princes of Moscow were descendants of Daniel. As Daniel never became grand prince of Vladimir before he died in 1303, this meant that according to traditional succession practices, his descendants were izgoi: his son and successor Yury of Moscow had no legitimate claim to the throne of Vladimir. This is why Tokhta Khan granted Mikhail of Tver the grand princely title when Andrey of Gorodets died the next year (27 July 1304). Nevertheless, the princes of Moscow managed to play towards the favour of the Mongol khans of the Golden Horde in order to be awarded the grand princely title through a yarlik by the second quarter of the 14th century, in disregard of dynastic traditions. The Horde sought to use Moscow to weaken the Principality of Tver (the strongest principality), but by the second half of the 14th century, when the Horde got embroiled in a decades-long war of succession known as the Great Troubles, the Muscovite princes managed to grow too powerful, and the khans were too late to start awarding the yarlik of grand prince of Vladimir to the princes of Tver instead in order to keep Moscow in check. Dmitry Donskoy passed the grand principality to his son Vasily I in his 1389 will, thus usurping the right of the khan to choose the grand prince.

== List ==
Princes of Moscow

Name	Lifespan	Reign start	Reign end	Notes	Family	Image
Daniel: Даниил Александрович	1261 – 4 March 1303	1283	4 March 1303	Son of Alexander Nevsky and Maria	Rurik	
Yury: Юрий Данилович	1281 – 21 November 1325	4 March 1303	21 November 1325	Son of Daniel; Elder brother of Ivan I	Rurik	
Ivan I: Иван I Даниилович Калита	1288 – 1340	1332	31 March 1340	He was a successor of Alexander of Suzdal as Grand Prince of Vladimir and a successor of Yury of Moscow as Grand Prince of Moscow	Rurik	
Simeon: Семён Иванович Гордый	7 November 1316 – 27 April 1353	31 March 1340	27 April 1353	Son of Ivan I and Helena	Rurik	
Ivan II: Иван II Иванович Красный	30 March 1326 – 13 November 1359	27 April 1353	13 November 1359	Son of Ivan I and Helena; Younger brother of Simeon of Moscow	Rurik	
Dmitry Donskoy: Дмитрий Иванович Донской	12 October 1350 – 19 May 1389	13 November 1359	19 May 1389	Son of Ivan II and Alexandra Vasilyevna Velyaminova	Rurik	

Grand princes of Moscow

Name	Lifespan	Reign start	Reign end	Notes	Family	Image
Vasily I: Василий Дмитриевич	30 December 1371 – 27 February 1425	19 May 1389	27 February 1425	Son of Dmitry I and Eudoxia Dmitriyevna	Rurik	
Vasily II: Василий Васильевич (Василий Тёмный)	10 March 1415 – 27 March 1462	27 February 1425	30 March 1434	Son of Vasily I and Sophia of Lithuania. Deposed Regent: Sophia of Lithuania (1425–1432)	Rurik	
Yury: of Zvenigorod Юрий Дмитриевич	26 November 1374 – 5 June 1434	31 March 1434	5 June 1434	Son of Dmitry I and Eudoxia Dmitriyevna; Younger brother of Vasily I	Rurik	
Vasily: the Squint; of Zvenigorod Василий Юрьевич (Василий Косой)	1421 – 1448	5 June 1434	1435	Son of Yury of Zvenigorod and Anastasia of Smolensk	Rurik	
Vasily II: the Dark; Василий Васильевич (Василий Тёмный)	10 March 1415 – 27 March 1462	1435	1446	Restored	Rurik	
Dmitry: Shemyaka; Дмитрий Юрьевич (Дмитрий Шемяка)	1400s – 17 July 1453	1446	26 March 1447	Son of Yury of Zvenigorod and Anastasia of Smolensk, brother of Vasily the Squint; First to use the title of Ospodar of all the Rus'	Rurik	
Vasily II: the Dark; Василий Васильевич (Василий Тёмный)	10 March 1415 – 27 March 1462	27 February 1447	27 March 1462	Restored Co-ruler: Ivan (since 1449)	Rurik	
Ivan III: the Great; Иван Васильевич (Иван Великий)	22 January 1440 – 6 November 1505	5 April 1462	6 November 1505	Son of Vasily II and Maria of Borovsk Co-rulers: Ivan the Young (1471–1490), Dmitry the Grandson (1498–1502), Vasily (since 1502)	Rurik	
Vasily III: Василий Иванович	25 March 1479 – 13 December 1533	6 November 1505	13 December 1533	Son of Ivan III and Sophia Paleologue	Rurik	
Ivan IV: the Terrible; Иван Васильевич	25 August 1530 – 28 March 1584	13 December 1533	26 January 1547	Son of Vasily III and Elena Glinskaya Regent: Elena Glinskaya (1533–1538)	Rurik	

== See also ==
- List of Russian monarchs
- Family tree of Russian monarchs

== Bibliography ==
- Fennell, John (23 September 2022). The Emergence of Moscow, 1304-1359. Univ of California Press. ISBN 978-0-520-34758-8.
- Filjushkin, Alexander (2006). Tituly russkikh gosudarey Титулы русских государей [The Titles of Russian Rulers] (in Russian). Moscow, St. Petersburg: Al'yans-Arkheo. ISBN 9785988740117.
- Alef, Gustave (1959). "The Political Significance of the Inscriptions on Muscovite Coinage in the Reign of Vasili II". Speculum. 34 (1): 1–19. doi:10.2307/2847975. JSTOR 2847975.
- Halperin, Charles J. (1987). Russia and the Golden Horde: The Mongol Impact on Medieval Russian History. Indiana University. p. 222. ISBN 9781850430575. (e-book).
- Martin, Janet (2007). Medieval Russia: 980–1584. Second Edition. E-book. Cambridge: Cambridge University Press. ISBN 978-0-511-36800-4.
