= Korela Fortress =

Historic fort in Leningrad Oblast, Russia

Coordinates: 61°01′46″N 30°07′22″E

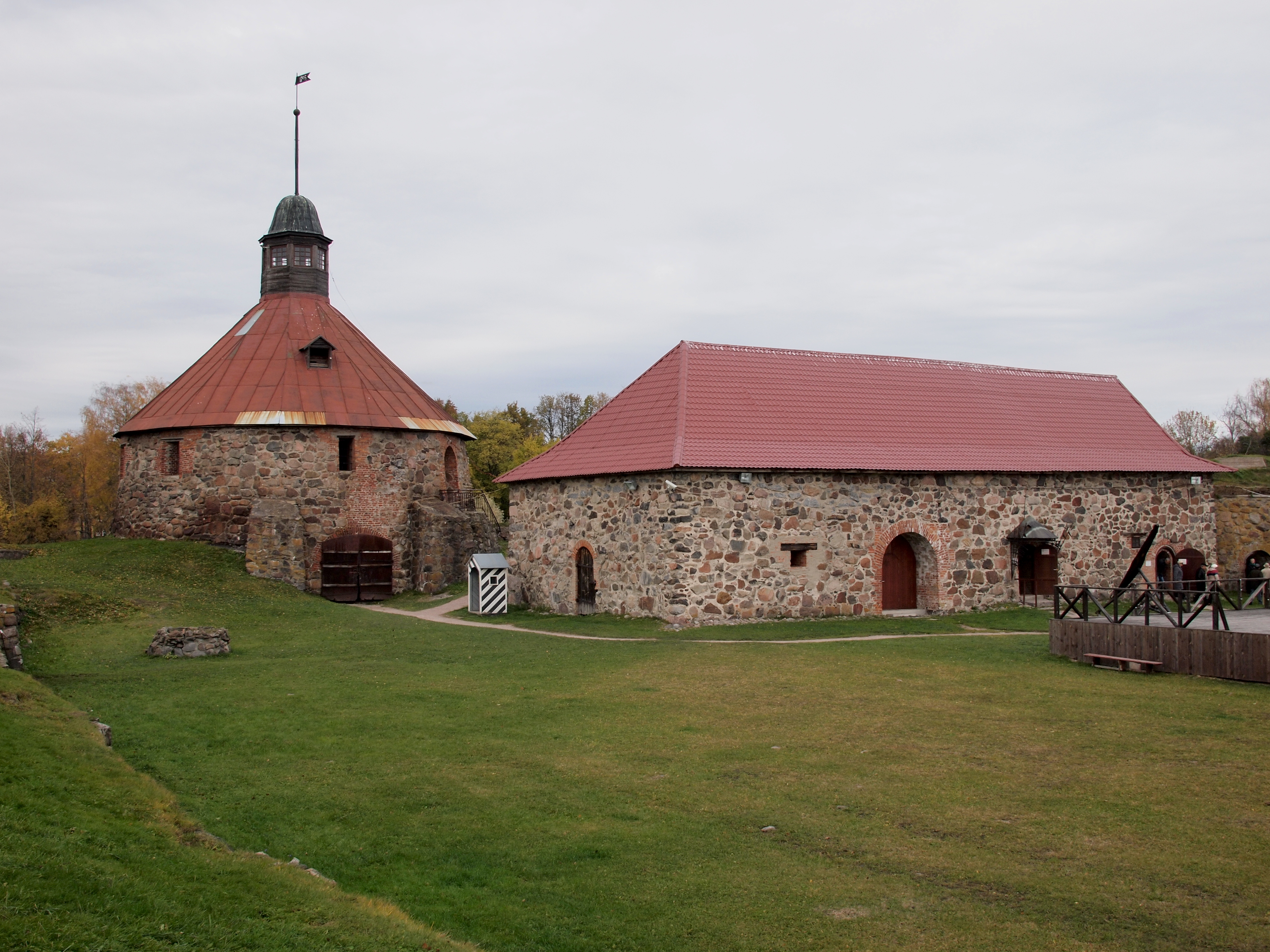
Inner court of the fort

Korela Fortress (Russian: Корела; Finnish: Käkisalmen linna; Swedish: Kexholms fästning) is a medieval fortress in the town of Priozersk, Leningrad Oblast, Russia.

== Origin ==
The original fortification was built by Karelians but the castle seen today is from medieval times. It was first mentioned in a Novgorodian chronicle of 1143 as Korela, and archaeological digs have revealed a layer belonging to the 12th century. Swedish chronicles first reported of the settlement of Keksholm in 1294. Until the 16th century, the fortress belonged to the Novgorod Republic, followed by Muscovy. Novgorodians built the current stone bastions and towers in 1364 after a fire had destroyed the original wooden fortress in 1360.

During a Swedish-Novgorodian war in 1314, a small Karelian force re-captured their fortress from the representatives of Novgorod. They invited Swedes to keep it against Novgorod; however, the Novgorodians reconquered the fortress. The fortress was confirmed as belonging to Novgorod in the treaty of Nöteborg of 1323.

== Principality of Korela ==
In the 1330s, the Novgorod Republic gave the castle of Korela (and practically the entire Votian fifth, including the forts of Oreshek and Ladoga), to duke Narimantas of Lithuania. In 1383 Korela, Oreshek and Koporye were inherited by Narimantas' son, Patrikas, the forefather of the Galitzine princely clan. The following year local burghers lodged a complaint about his administration, and Patrikas was forced to exchange Korela for Ladoga and Russa. Patrikas occupied his lands in Ingria and Karelia at least from 1383 to 1397. In 1408, it is recorded that he settled in Moscow under the protection of Vasili I, together with his younger sons, Georgi and Fyodor, who had grown up in Ingria.

== Swedish rule and administration ==
Soon after their seizure of Korela in 1580, the Swedes rebuilt the fortress following a Western European pattern of bastion fortifications. In the Treaty of Teusina of 1595 Sweden undertook to return Korela to Russia. This was effected in 1597. During the subsequent Ingrian War starting 1610, Gustavus Adolphus restored Swedish control of the castle and the whole area. During the Time of Troubles, Korela was a prize promised by Vasily IV of Russia to Jacob De la Gardie as part of the Swedish De la Gardie Campaign to assist Russia against the Polish-Lithuanian commonwealth. They were incorporated with Sweden as Kexholm County in the Treaty of Stolbovo in 1617. The fortress and the region remained with Sweden until Peter the Great captured the fortress and parts of Kexholm County during the Great Northern War.

== Grand Duchy of Finland ==
After losing the Finnish War in 1809 Sweden ceded its eastern half to Russia and in 1812 Kexholm (Finnish: Käkisalmi) was incorporated into Viipuri Province of the Grand Duchy of Finland. In the mid-18th century, the fortress was turned into a political prison of Imperial Russia. Some participants of the Decembrist Revolt (1825) were confined there.

== Republic of Finland ==
In early-December 1917 Finland declared independence and Käkisalmi became part of the independent Finland. In 1940, following the Winter War, Käkisalmi and the eastern portion of Finnish Karelia were ceded to the Soviet Union. During the Continuation War in 1941–1944, Finland temporarily gained back Käkisalmi, until the Soviet Union managed to reclaim it. The town was renamed Priozersk on October 1, 1948.

== In popular culture ==
In October 1996, the opening scene of the film Brother was filmed outside the walls of the fortress. In the scene, the protagonist, Danila Bagrov, walks onto a filming set for a Nautilus Pompilius music video.
