= Large Sakkos of Photius =

Satin tunic

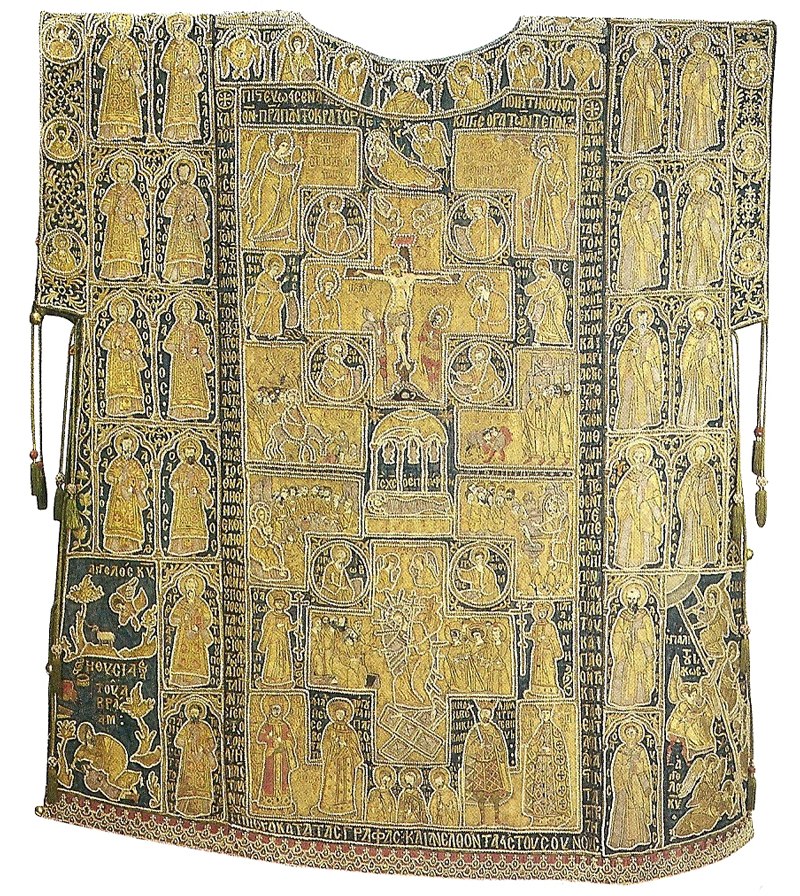
Large Sakkos of Photius, ca. 1417

The Large Sakkos of Photius (Russian: Большой саккос митрополита Фотия; also known as the Major Sakkos) is a satin tunic embroidered with gold and silver thread and decorated with silk and pearl ornament, approximately 4 ft 5 in long. It is a luxury item created in the late Byzantine era for Photius, the metropolitan of the Russian Orthodox Church, around 1417. It is currently held in the Kremlin Armoury in Moscow, Russia.

The satin sakkos is embroidered with gold and silver thread and colored silks outlined with pearls. Dozens of religious and secular figures appear on the sakkos in an array of rectilinear, L-shaped, cruciform, and circular frames. The Crucifixion dominates the center of the front, and below is the Anastasis ("the Resurrection"). All around are various Orthodox Church feasts and figures of saints, as well as Old Testament scenes, including the binding of Isaac, linked with the Crucifixion of Christ.

Also portrayed are Vasily I of Moscow and his wife Sophia Vitovtovna (labeled in Russian), as well as the future emperor John VIII Palaeologus and his wife Anna Vasilyevna (named in Greek). Beside John is Photius. The sakkos also contains the earliest known depiction of Ss. Anthony, John, and Eustathius, the Three Martyrs of Vilnius.

Needleworkers most likely embroidered the sakkos between the time of John's marriage in 1416 and Anna Vasilyevna's death in 1418. The couple probably sent the sakkos to Photius as a gift.
