= Ivan Vasilyevich (disambiguation) =

Ivan Vasilyevich commonly refers to Tsar Ivan the Terrible.

Ivan Vasilyevich may also refer to:

- Ivan III of Russia (1440-1505)
- Ivan IV of Ryazan (1467-1500)
- Ivan Vasilyevich of Smolensk (died 1386)
- Ivan Vasilyevich prince of Moscow (1396-1417)

== Fiction ==
- Ivan Vasilievich (play)
