= House of Izmaylov =

House of Izmaylov Измайловы
- noble/boyar family
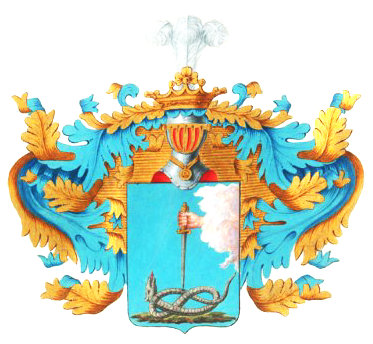
- Coat-of-arms of the Izmaylovs of Ryazan
- Current region: Russia
- Origin: disputed: Golden Horde, Principality of Chernigov, Principality of Ryazan
- Founded: 14th century
- Founder: Ismail Prokofyevich Shayn
- Estates: Bykovo, Ramensky District, Moscow Oblast Filimonki, Moscow Golubino, Yasenevo District, Moscow

The House of Izmaylov is a prominent family of Russian high nobility, descended from the boyars of the Grand Duchy of Ryazan. The Izmaylov family was one of the most powerful in the Duchy of Ryazan. The family was listed in the parts 6 ('ancient nobility') of the genealogical books of Moscow, Ryazan and Tambov.

== History ==
According to the genealogical legend, the Izmaylovs of Ryazan are descended from Ivan Ivanovich Shain (Shalin), a voivode from Chernigov, who supposedly moved to Ryazan in the 13th —14th centuries. G.F. Miller attributed them to Tatar Muslim origins. One more version suggests that Ivan Shain could be an illegitimate offspring of one of the Ryazanian princes. The family name, Izmaylov, is claimed to Ivan Shain's grandson, Izmail.

The Reference Book of Mestnichestvo by Yu.V. Tatischev gives an alternative genealogy for the Izmaylovs claimed by their rivals. According to it, Izmaylov's progenitor was a priest named Izmail who came together with a family named Schoyn (Щойн) from Chernigov to the court of Oleg II of Ryazan.

Izmail's son, Shaban, served as falconer at the Ryazanian court, while his son, Ivan Inka Izmaylov, was created boyar. In 1492 Ivan Inka Izmaylov was the commander of the Ryazanian troops under the Grand Duke of Ryazan Ivan Ivanovich.

His descendant, Mikhail Nikitich Izmaylov, was the ambassador of Moscow Duke Vasily III to Crimea in 1520. His brother, Jacob, was the viceroy in Ryazan, while Pyotr was a voivode at Dedilov and Mikhailov. Andrey Yakovlevich Izmaylov was a voivode under Ivan the Terrible.

Despite being one of the most powerful families in Ryazan, the Izmaylovs, as most Ryazanian boyar families, failed to establish a similar standing under the rule of Moscow. They were not listed in the Tsar's genealogical books, as was needed to claim offices and ranks under the Moscow peerage. During the 16th — 17th centuries the Izmaylovs continued to be appointed voivodes at Ryazanian cities.

Despite struggling to establish themselves at the Moscow royal court, the Izmaylovs managed to maintain relatively high standing in the 18th century. Some members of the family supported Peter III, but later betrayed him.

They had intermarried with the prominent Russian princely families. The family occupied highest ranks in Russia, were generals, governors and commanders.

== Some estates ==
- Filimonki (now New Moscow).
- Bykovo (Ramensky district, Moscow Oblast), formerly owned by the Vorontsov family. Granted by Catherine II to Mikhail Mikhailovich Izmaylov in the second half of the 18th century. M.M. Izmaylov died childless and the estate returned to the Vorontsov family.
- Golubino (Yasenevo district, Moscow), owned since 1619 by stolnik Timofey Izmaylov. In the early 1800s the estate passed to the Gerard family, changing owners ever since.

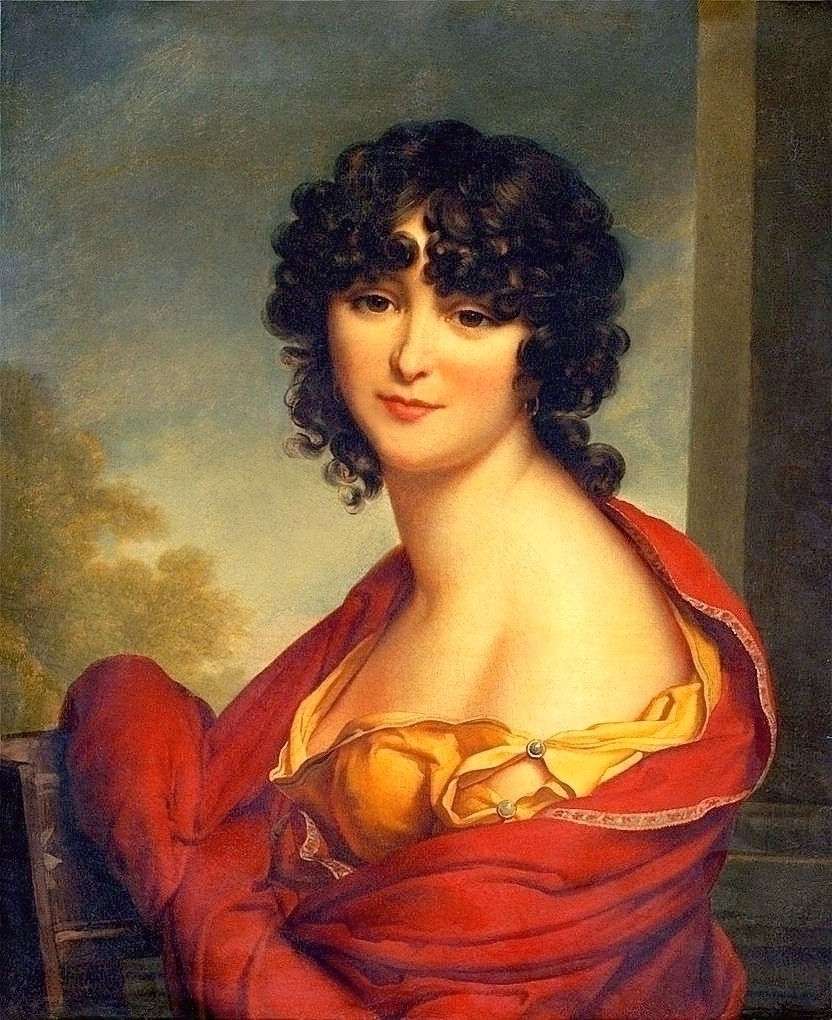
Princess Evdokia Golitzine (née Izmaylova)

== The Izmaylovs of Tver ==
There is one more Izmaylov noble family in Russia. This family is descended from a Lithuanian Mark Demidovich who came to the Duke of Tver Ivan Michailovich in the 15th century. This family is listed in the part 6 of the genealogical book of Tver.

== The Izmaylovo estate ==
It is still argued whether the Izmaylovo in the current city of Moscow actually belonged to the Ryazanian Izmaylovs. Some researchers claim that this estate was founded by a different noble family of Lithuanian origins that had the same last name. The Lithuanian Izmaylovs settled in Tver and belonged to the Tver boyars.

== Notable members ==
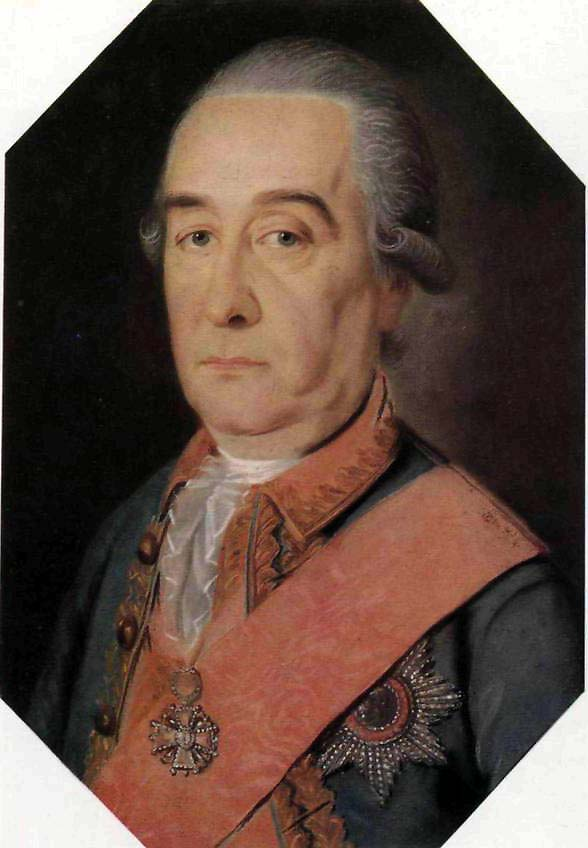
General Mikhail Izmaylov

- Ivan Inka Ivanovich Izmaylov was a Ryazanian boyar and the commander of the troops of the Grand Duchy of Ryazan in the late 15th century.
- Mikhail Nikitich Izmaylov was the ambassador to Crimea under Duke Vasily III in 1552.
- Andrey Petrovich Izmaylov (died 1714) was a stolnik under Peter the Great and the ambassador to Denmark (1701-1707), the governor of Astrakhan (1728-1735), the viceroy at Suzdal, the governor of Nizhny-Novgorod in 1714
- Lev Vasilievich Izmaylov (1685-1738) was a Russian general who had a mission to China to establish trade relationships.
- Mikhail Lvovich Izmaylov (1734—1799) was a confidant of Peter III, who betrayed him and told him into surrendering to the plotters.
- Alexander Efimovich Izmaylov (1779—1831) was a Russian publicist.
