= Eudoxia of Moscow =

Grand princess of Moscow

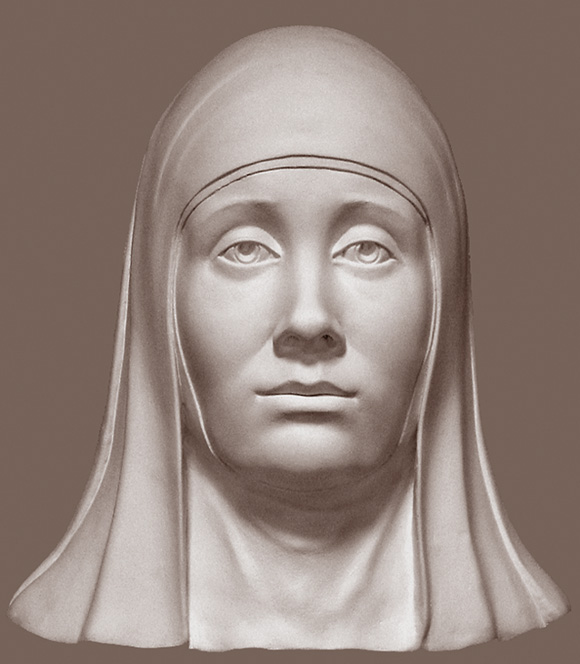
- Forensic facial reconstruction

Grand princess of Moscow
- Tenure: 18 January 1366 – 19 May 1389
- Predecessor: Alexandra Velyaminova
- Successor: Sophia of Lithuania
- Born: Evdokia Dmitriyevna; 1353
- Died: 7 July 1407; Moscow, Grand Duchy of Moscow
- Burial: Ascension Convent, Moscow Kremlin
- Spouse: Dmitry Donskoy
- Issue Detail: Vasily Dmitriyevich; Yury Dmitriyevich
- House: Rurikids
- Father: Dmitry of Suzdal
- Mother: Vasilisa of Rostov

Eudoxia of Moscow (Russian: Евдокия Дмитриевна, romanized: Yevdokia Dmitriyevna; 1353 – 1407), also known by her monastic name Euphrosyne (Russian: Евфросиния), was the grand princess of Moscow between 1366 and 1389 during her marriage to Dmitry Donskoy.

== Biography ==
Eudoxia was a daughter of Dmitry Konstantinovich, Grand Prince of Suzdal and Nizhny Novgorod and Vasilisa of Rostov.

Her maternal grandparents were Konstantin Vasilievich, Prince of Rostov and Maria of Moscow. Maria was a daughter of Ivan I of Moscow and his first wife Yelena.

On 18 January 1366, Eudoxia married Grand Prince Dmitry Donskoy. In 1382, she stayed in Moscow in the absence of her husband, while the army of khan Tokhtamysh was approaching the capital. After the birth of her son Andrey Dmitriyevich, she attempted to leave Moscow, but was detained by the Muscovites, who agreed to let her go only after long negotiations.

== Religious works ==
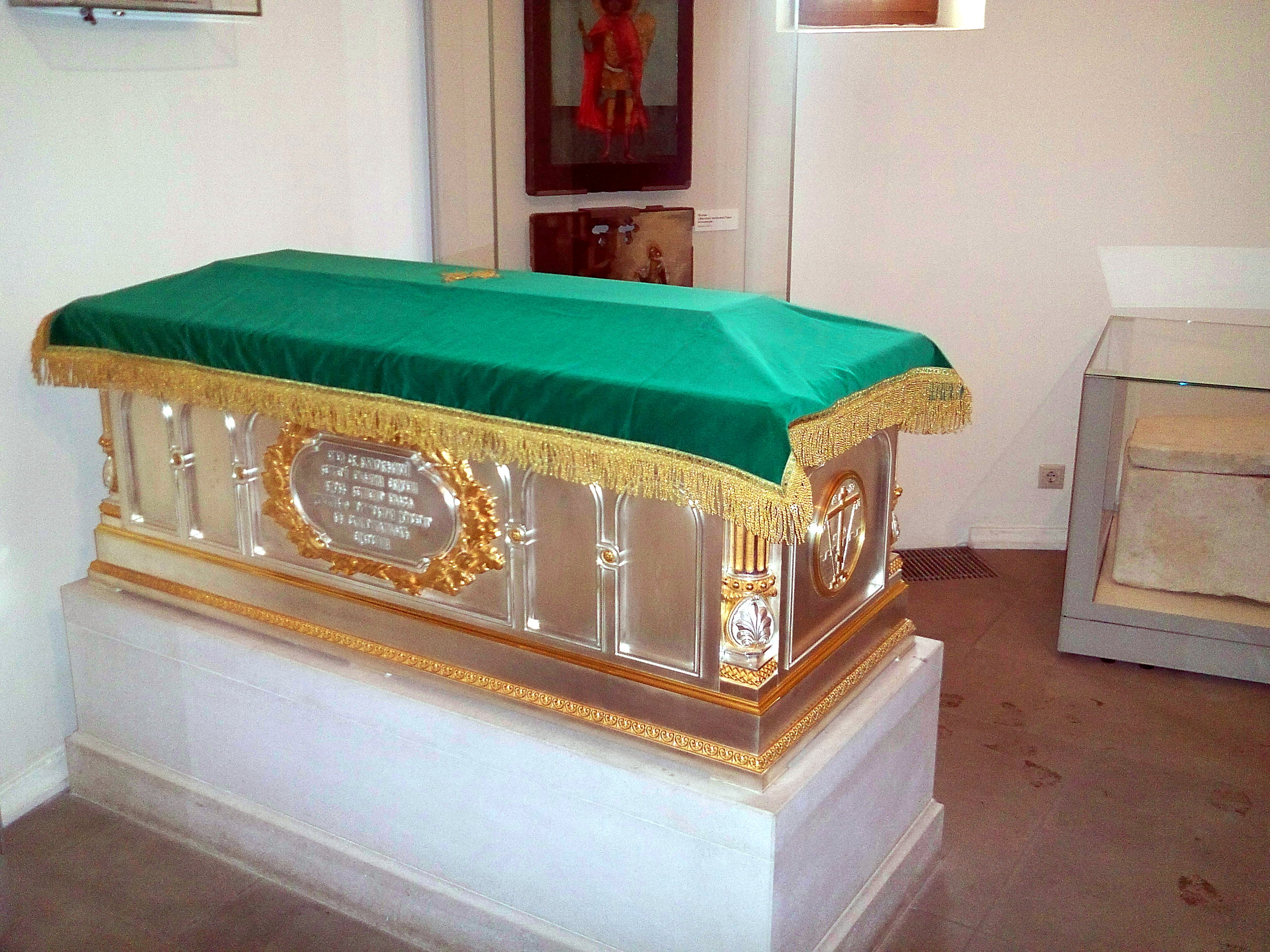
Shrine (Raka) of Eudoxia of Moscow

She was greatly influenced by Alexius, Metropolitan of Kiev. After her husband's death, Eudoxia became known for her piety; legend has it that she possessed the gift of healing. To commemorate her husband's victory at the Battle of Kulikovo, Eudoxia commissioned an icon of the Archangel Michael, which later became the patronal icon of the Kremlin's Archangel Cathedral.

In 1387, Eudoxia established the Ascension Monastery next to the Frolovskaya (Spasskaya) Tower of the Moscow Kremlin. Later in her life, Eudoxia Dmitriyevna took the veil at the Ascension Monastery under the name of Yefrosiniya (Euphrosyne) and remained there until her death in 1407.

In 1393, she founded the Church of the Nativity of the Theotokos (Церковь Рождества Богородицы), the oldest surviving building in Moscow. The church was dedicated to the Virgin's Nativity, because on this feast her husband defeated the Tatars in the Battle of Kulikovo. According to tradition, in 1395, during Tamerlane's invasion into southern Russia, she had the Vladimir Icon of the Mother of God transferred to Moscow.

Euphrosyne died on 7 July 1407 and was buried in the Ascension Convent. In 1929, the authorities ordered the destruction of the church and her relics were lost, but were uncovered in 2002, and then transferred to the Cathedral of the Archangel located inside the Kremlin.

She was canonized by the Russian Orthodox Church.

== Children ==
Eudoxia and Dmitri Donskoi had at least 12 children:

- Daniil Dmitrievich (c. 1370 – 15 September 1379).
- Vasily I of Moscow (30 September 1371 – 27 February 1425).
- Sofia Dmitrievna. Married Fyodor Olegovich, Prince of Ryazan (reigned 1402–1427).
- Yury Dmitrievich, Duke of Zvenigorod and Galich (26 November 1374 – 5 June 1434). Claimed the throne of Moscow against his nephew Vasily II of Moscow.
- Maria Dmitrievna (d. 15 May 1399). Married Lengvenis.
- Anastasia Dmitrievna. Married Ivan Vsevolodich, Prince of Kholm.
- Simeon Dmitrievich (d. 11 September 1379).
- Ivan Dmitrievich (d. 1393).
- Andrei Dmitrievich, Prince of Mozhaysk (14 August 1382 – 9 July 1432).
- Piotr Dmitrievich, Prince of Dmitrov (29 July 1385 – 10 August 1428).
- Anna Dmitrievna (born 8 January 1387). Married Yuri Patrikievich. Her husband was a son of Patrikei, Prince of Starodub and his wife Yelena. His paternal grandfather was Narimantas. The marriage solidified his role as a Boyar attached to Moscow.
- Konstantin Dmitrievich, Prince of Pskov (14 May/15 May 1389 – 1433).

== Legacy ==
On 15 August 2007, the Holy Synod of the Russian Orthodox Church instituted the Order of St. Euphrosyne, named after Eudoxia, who was the first noblewoman of Moscow to enter monasticism. The award was established to commemorate the 600th anniversary of Euphrosyne's death. According to the synod's ukase (decree), the new decoration will be given to women for special contributions towards the strengthening of spiritual and moral traditions in society, development of the church's social activities, maintaining relations between church and state or church and society, and other fields of work for the betterment of the Orthodox faith. The Order of St. Euphrosyne will be the second women's decoration of the Russian Orthodox Church after the Order of Saint Olga.

Eudoxia of Moscow Daniilovichi Born: 14th century – 1407
Russian royalty
Vacant Title last held by Alexandra Velyaminova	Grand Princess of Moscow; 1367–1389	Vacant Title next held by Sophia of Lithuania
