= Anna of Ryazan =

Russian noblewoman, Regent of the Ryazan Principality in 1483 and in 1500–1501

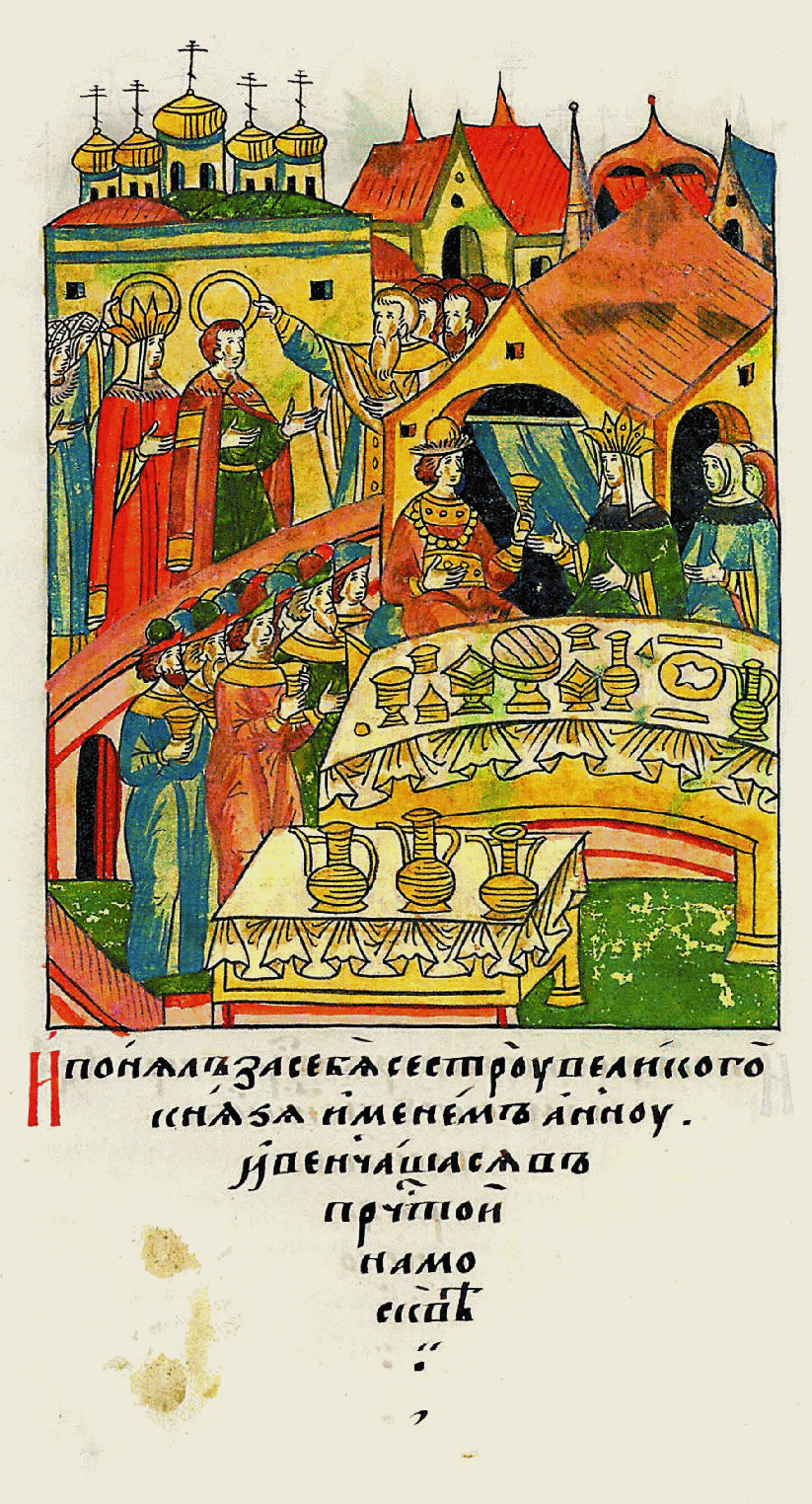
Wedding of Anna and Vasily of Ryazan, miniature from the Illustrated Chronicle of Ivan the Terrible

Anna Vasilievna of Ryazan (Russian: Анна Васильевна; 1451–1501) was a Russian noblewoman who served as the regent of the Principality of Ryazan in 1483 and from 1500 to 1501, during the minority of her son and grandson.

== Early life ==
She was the only daughter of Vasily II of Moscow and the mother and grandmother of the last grand princes of Ryazan, as well as the sister of Ivan III. Anna was born in Moscow to the family of Vasily II, who was blinded five years before her birth during a time of troubles, and Maria Yaroslavna of Borovsk.

Before his death in 1456, Grand Prince Ivan Fyodorovich of Ryazan entrusted his friend Vasily II of Moscow with temporary governance of the principality and the care of his children, Vasily and Theodosia, until their maturity. However, soon after Ivan's death, Vasily moved the orphaned children to Moscow and appointed a voevoda to Ryazan. This decision bargain a process of joining Ryazan to the Grand Principality of Moscow. Vasily II's heir Ivan III continued his father's policy towards Ryazan, and Anna grew up together with Ryazan prince Vasily.

== Marriage ==
Some stories identify Anna's mother as the architect of the marriage between Anna and Vasily; she supposedly asked her son Ivan III to delay annexation of Ryazan because it was not suitable to a Grand Princess to marry an ordinary nobleman even of princely descent. Whatever the case, for instance, Ivan III may have wished for the marriage in order to cement his claim on Ryazan, Ivan III allowed sixteen-year Prince Vasily to return to his family seat in the summer of 1464. That winter, Vasily came to Moscow to marry Anna and, after the wedding, the couple returned to Ryazan together.

In 1467, Anna bore a son Ivan, and until the death of her husband in 1483, did not participate in governing the principality and did not protest when her brother two times annexed Ryazan territories.

== Regency ==
In 1483, Anna became the regent of her sixteen-year son. In her policy, Anna tried to expand her domain, she visited often Moscow, and due her diplomatic efforts, the Principality of Pronsk was added to Ryazan. A major issue in relations between Ryazan and Moscow was the so-called ryazan ukraina, a huge steppe region in the basin of the Don River. According to treaties, Ryazan was obliged not to settle in these lands, but over many years, the princes of Ryazan secretly colonized this area, and during the Anna's regency, this process became much more significant. Numerous immigrants received considerable privileges, being released for 3–7 years from taxes if they agreed to remain in the steppe for ever.

Anna's son died in 1500, and until her death in 1501, she was the regent of her grandson Ivan V of Ryazan. After the end of Anna's reign, Ryazan finally lost its independence. Aside from Ivan, Anna had a son called Fyodor and a daughter called Anna, who was married to Lithuanian prince Fyodor Ivanovich Belsky.

== Sources ==
- (in Russian) Славянская энциклопедия. Киевская Русь-Московия. Т. 1: А-М, Published by Olma Media Group, 2001, ISBN 5-224-02250-9, ISBN 978-5-224-02250-2 (available in Google Books)
