= Anna of Moscow =

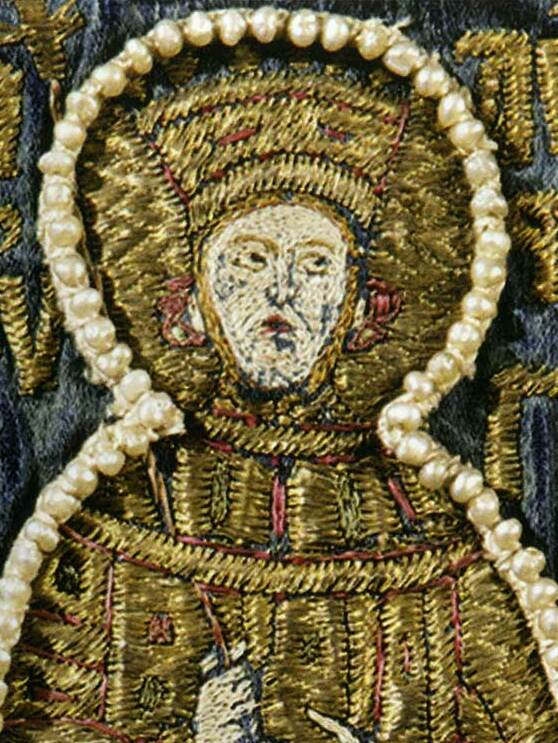
- Anna on the Large Sakkos of Photius, 1410s

Empress consort of the Byzantine Empire
- Tenure: 1416–1417 (with Helena Dragaš)
- Born: 1393
- Died: August 1417 (aged 23–24)
- Spouse: John VIII Palaiologos (m. 1414)
- Dynasty: Rurik
- Father: Vasily I of Moscow
- Mother: Sophia of Lithuania

Anna Vasilyevna of Moscow (Russian: Анна Васильевна; 1393 – August 1417) was a Byzantine empress consort by marriage to John VIII Palaiologos. She died while her husband was still the junior co-emperor of the Byzantine Empire.

== Life ==
She was one of four daughters of Vasily I of Moscow and Sophia of Lithuania.

She married John VIII in 1414. Her husband was the eldest surviving son of Manuel II Palaiologos and Helena Dragaš. John was named Despotes in 1416 and seems to have assumed the position of co-emperor shortly thereafter.

Anna was second in status only to her mother-in-law among the women of the Byzantine court. The history of Doukas records her dying of the "plague" in 1417. She is thought to be a victim of bubonic plague. Following the Black Death this plague continued to strike parts of Europe sporadically until the 17th century, each time with reduced intensity and fatality, suggesting an increased resistance due to genetic selection.

Anna of Moscow Rurik Born: 1393 Died: 1417
Royal titles
Preceded by Helena Dragaš	Byzantine Empress consort 1416–1417 with Helena Dragaš (1416–1417)	Succeeded by Helena Dragaš
