= Ivan V of Ryazan =

- Grand Prince of Ryazan
- Reign: 29 May 1500 – 1521
- Predecessor: Ivan IV of Ryazan
- Regent: Anna of Ryazan, until April 1500 Grand Duchess Agrafena of Ryazan
- Born: 1495/96; Ryazan
- Died: 1533/34; Stakliškės, Grand Duchy of Lithuania
- Spouse: unknown
- Issue: unknown
- House: House of Ryazan, Sviatoslavichi
- Father: Ivan IV of Ryazan
- Mother: Grand Duchess Agrafena of Ryazan, nee Princess Babich-Drutskaya
- Religion: Christian, Russian Orthodoxy

Grand Prince Ivan V of Ryazan (Ivan Ivanovich, Russian: Иван Иванович Рязанский) (1496 – 1533 or 1534) was the last nominally independent ruler of Ryazan Principality. Ivan V of Ryazan was the only son of Prince Ivan Vasilievich and his wife, Agrippina (Agrafena) Vasilyevna, Princess Babich-Drutskaya.

== Domestic affairs ==
After the death of his father in 1500, he became the nominal ruler under the regency of his grandmother Anna Vasilievna and then, after her death in 1501, of his mother. During the regency, the principality was under strong influence of the Grand Duchy of Moscow. In 1503, unsuccessfully, he and his mother, attempted to return the Ryazanian lands passed to Moscow by Prince Fyodor, his uncle. In 1507, Vasily III, attempted to reinforce Ryazanian lands in his authority; he appointed a number of officials to Ryazan. In 1509 Vasily III appointed a viceroy to Perevitsk, while the local boyars entered service to the Duke of Moscow.

In 1514 Ivan V of Ryazan started to govern on his own. The Moscow viceroys and garrisons left his domains. Ivan V of Ryazan stopped participating in campaigns of Vasily III of Moscow, seeking support from the boyars who desired independence for the Duchy of Ryazan. Thus, he turned to the Crimean Khanate in order to find support against Moscow. To seal the deal, Prince Ivan Ivanovich was to marry one of the daughters of Mehmed I Giray. In 1520, Grand Prince Vasili III of Russia invited him to Moscow and imprisoned him immediately after his arrival. His mother was confined in a cloister and the Moscow viceroy was returned to Ryazan.

== Escape to the Grand Duchy of Lithuania ==
In summer 1521, during the unrest caused by an invasion of the Crimean Khan, Mehmed I Giray, Prince Ivan Ivanovich escaped from Moscow to Pereyaslavl of Ryazan. But he failed to get support from the local nobility, many of whom switched to Moscow. He received a writ of protection from the Grand Duke of Lithuania Sigismund I the Old, and fled to Lithuania, where he was granted with the town of Stakliškės in the Trakai Voivodeship. He had a small court of servants and boyars there. After his escape, the Ryazan Principality was merged with the Muscovy and the Ryazan Governorate (namestnichestvo) was formed.

Ivan died without known issue in Lithuania around 1534. It is unknown if he was ever married. Upon his death his Lithuanian estate passed to his first cousin through his mother, Prince Semyon Fyodorovich Belsky, a refugee from Moscow.
