= Patrikas =

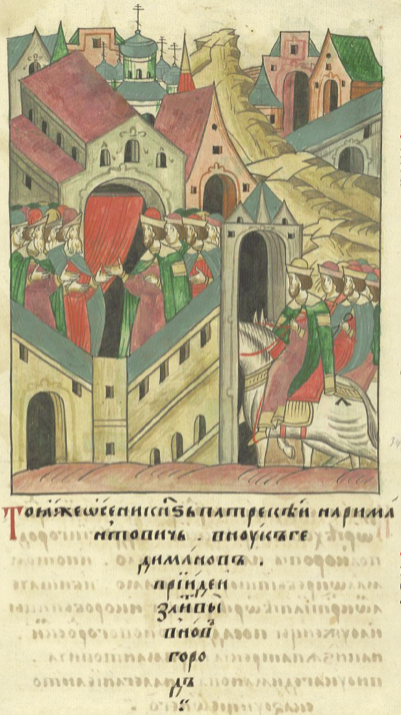
Patrikas arrives in Novgorod, miniature from the Illustrated Chronicle of Ivan the Terrible (16th century)

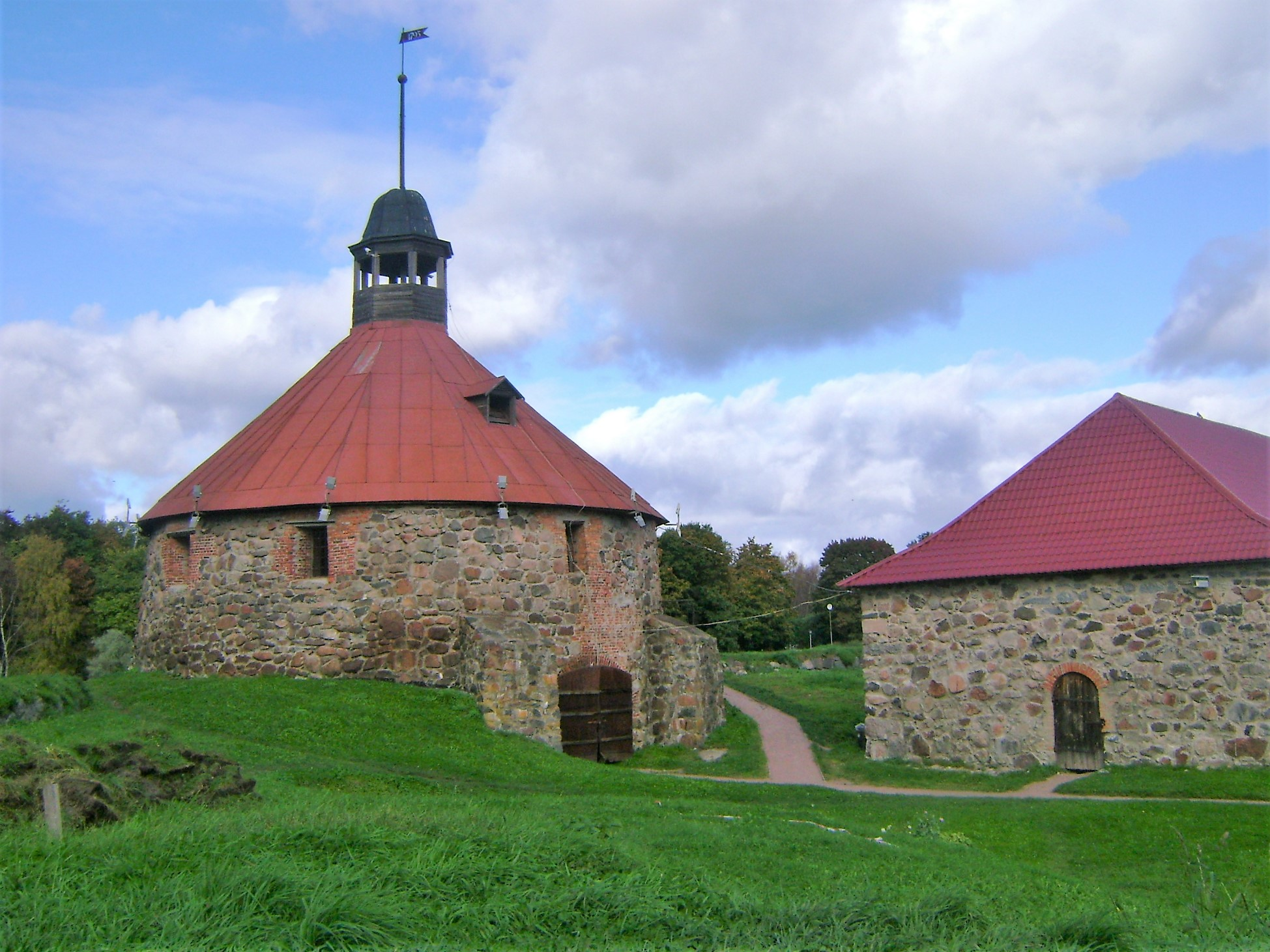
The Korela Fortress was built by Patrikas and his father on the bank of the Vuoksi River

Patrikey Glebovich or Patrikas Narimantaitis (Russian: Патрикей Глебович) was a grandson (or great-grandson) of Gediminas who exchanged his lands in and near Starodub in Siveria for the Korela and Oreshek fortresses in the Novgorod Republic. He also founded the town of Yamskaya krepost (Yamburg) (now Kingisepp) near Pskov. His male line descendants include the Golitsyns, Kurakins, and Khovansky princely houses of Russia.

== Life ==
Patrikas was born sometime around 1340 and died after 1408, which is the last time he is mentioned in any source. Genealogical literature usually reports that his mother was a khatun from Crimea. An 18th-century author claims that her father was khan Tokhta, Batu Khan's great-grandson, and her mother was Maria Palaiologina, a bastard daughter of Andronikos II Palaiologos. Patrikas' wife was named Helena (see ES by Schwennicke; and Ikonnikov).

In 19th century genealogical literature about him there has arisen a controversy as to who was Patrikas' father: was he a son of Narimantas, or a son of Alexander, himself a son of Narimantas. Some 19th century Russian literature chose to report Alexander as the father, whereas 20th century standard literature such as Ikonnikov and Europäische Stammtafeln continue to report Narimantas as Patrikas' father. The source authored closer to the lifetime of Patrikas himself, in the 14th–15th centuries, namely the chronicle of Novgorod, explicitly calls him Patrika son of Narimant when reporting his holding of castles in 1383–1384.

In the 1380s, Patrikas arrived to Novgorod to claim the inheritance of his father, Narimantas. He was ceded the fiefs of Korela, Oreshek, Koporye, Luga, and Ladoga. He held practically all the "Votian land" as a fief from the Novgorod Republic. The Novgorodians kept the lands of Patrikas as a sort of buffer state between their republic and Sweden (see Swedish-Novgorodian Wars). Patrikas helped fortify the northwestern borders of the trade republic and built the fortress of Yam in the Luga district.

Europaeus (1859) reports that the commoners of Karelia still remembered their former Lithuanian rulers: "These Lithuanians held long ago the land of Karelia under their dominion, and it is still remembered by the local folks. It is said they had a treasury barn in Ilomantsi, a building with iron doors, where they stored their tax revenues. And there is a tale that during a retreat from a robbing expedition to the borders by these Lithuanians, their one boat, full of silver, wrecked and drowned in Suojärvi."

In 1386, Patrikas helped defend Veliki Novgorod and its territories against the attacks of Dmitry Donskoy, ruler of Moscow, who held Patrikas responsible for inciting the ushkuiniki (pirate) raids along the Volga River. Two years later, the Novgorodian government (probably under pressure from Moscow) gave the fiefs of Ladoga and Russa to another Lithuanian princeling, Lengvenis, son of Algirdas. Patrikas continued to rule Korela. In 1396 he went to Veliki Novgorod in order to meet Yuri of Smolensk.

In 1408, the elderly duke Patrikas, accompanied by his younger sons, George and Theodore, was ceremoniously welcomed in Moscow by its ruler Vasili I (himself son of Dimitri Donskoi). George married Vasili I's daughter and was made his trusted advisor. Duke Patrikas' descendants (such as Daniil Shchenya and Vassian Patrikeyev) actually held, during several generations afterwards, estates in the Votian fifth and in the region of Pskov.

== Sources and external links ==
- Ikonnikov, Nicolas F.: La noblesse de Russie part C
- Schwennicke, Detlev: Europaische Stammtafeln : Stammtafeln zur geschichte der europaischen staaten. Neue Folge Schwennicke, Europäische Stammtafeln, vol III/1. Verlag von J. A. Stargardt
- Русский биографический словарь Russki biografitšeski slovar, by Alexander Polovtsov, 1896–1918
- A.J. Europaeus, 1859, Karjalan ajan-tiedot Täysinän rauhaan asti, vuonna 1595, Aschan [www = https://web.archive.org/web/20120308105243/http://www.salakirjat.net/karjalan_ajan-tiedot.html (in Finnish)]
- (in Russian)
- Chronicle of Novgorod
- Sjöström (2011), Liettuan gediminidien suomensukuiset geneettiset juuret. ISSN 1239-3487, Donelaitis – Donelaitis-seuran, Liettuan Ystävät ryn lehti 1/2011, ss 16..18
