= Ivan IV of Ryazan =

- Grand Prince of Ryazan
- Reign: 7 January 1483 – 29 May 1485
- Predecessor: Grand Prince Vasily Ivanovich of Ryazan
- Successor: Grand Prince Ivan V of Ryazan (titular); Ivan the Great of Russia
- Regent: Grand Princess Anna of Ryazan
- Born: 14 April 1467; Moscow, Grand Duchy of Moscow
- Died: May 29, 1500 (aged 33); Ryazan
- Burial: Cathedral of the Dormition, Ryazan kremlin
- Spouse: Princess Agrafena Babich-Drutskaya
- Issue: Ivan V of Ryazan
- House: House of Ryazan, Sviatoslavichi
- Father: Grand Prince Vasily Ivanovich of Ryazan
- Mother: Grand Princess Anna of Ryazan
- Religion: Christian, Russian Orthodoxy

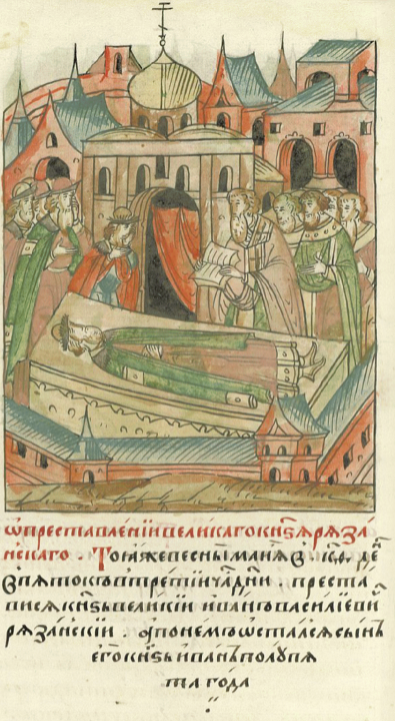
Death of Ivan Vasilyevich Ryazansky

Grand Prince Ivan IV of Ryazan (Ivan Vasilyevich of Ryazan; Russian: Иван Васильевич, великий князь рязанский; April 14, 1467, Moscow – May 29, 1500) was the ruler of the Grand Duchy of Ryazan (1483–1500). He was the elder son of Grand Prince Vasily Ivanovich of Ryazan and Grand Duchess of Ryazan Anna Vasilyevna, younger sister of Ivan III of Moscow. He had a younger brother, Prince Fyodor Vasilyevich, with whom he shared domains in the Duchy of Ryazan.

== Domestic affairs ==
Ivan Vasilyevich came to the throne of the Grand Duchy of Ryazan on the death of his father, Grand Prince Vasily Ivanovich, on January 7, 1483. As the elder son, he received Pereyaslavl of Ryazan (modern city of Ryazan), Rostislavl and Pronsk as his personal domains, while his younger brother, Prince Fyodor Vasilyevich (d. 1503), was given Perevitsk, Old Ryazan and a third of Pereyaslavl of Ryazan as appanage. For a period of time, their mother, Grand Duchess Anna Vasilyevna, sister of Prince Ivan III of Moscow, ruled the duchy as regent. On August 19, 1496, Grand Prince Ivan Vasilyevich concluded an agreement with his brother, Prince Fyodor, according to which Prince Fyodor promised to never betray his brother and always assist in his politics; both must avoid military attacks on each other's lands. The agreement implied that if Grand Prince Ivan Vasilyevich died childless, the throne would pass to his brother, Fyodor, while if the latter died childless, his appanages would pass to his elder brother. Their mother, Grand Duchess Anna Vasilyevna was to receive a quarter of all income from both brother's domains. The court servants were also divided between the brothers. The agreement also prohibited either of the brothers to purchase or mortgage each other's inhabited localities.

The internal politics of Ivan IV of Ryazan was focused on keeping Ryazanian boyars from entering Moscow court. He also granted large lands to the Church of Ryazan.

== Relations with Moscow ==
Ivan IV of Ryazan continued his father's politics of loyalty towards Moscow. On June 9, 1483, he concluded a treaty with his maternal uncle, Grand Prince Ivan III of Moscow, which, as a matter of fact, put the Duchy of Ryazan in the position of a vassal principality. Dmitry Ilovayski argued that the position of the Grand Prince of Ryazan under this treaty was similar to a viceroy, rather than a ruler. Ivan IV of Ryazan obliged himself to never betray Grand Prince of Moscow, seek alliances or vassalage to the Grand Duchy of Lithuania, or negotiate with the princes who escaped there. The relationships with Tatar princes were also to be in accordance with Moscow, while the Grand Prince of Ryazan, was to pursue and capture the fugitive princes of Meshchera. By that treaty the Grand Duchy of Ryazan lost many lands. Ivan IV of Ryazan had to admit the towns of Teshilov, Venyov and Rostovets as domains of Moscow, and never attempt to invade Yelets.

Upon the order of Ivan III of Moscow, Ivan IV of Ryazan had to send his troops to assist in military campaigns. In 1492–1494, Ryazanian troops took part in capturing the Principality of Vyazma and a number of Upper Oka towns. In 1493 Ryazanian troops headed by Prince Fyodor Vasilyevich and his warlord Ivan Inka Izmaylov had to capture Serpeysk and Mezetsk for Moscow, taken by Lithuanians prior to it. As a result, Ryazanian lands on the west faced multiple attacks from Lithuania. In the peace treaty with the Grand Duke of Lithuania, Alexander, of January–February 1494, Ivan IV of Ryazan declared that he was vassal to Moscow and his lands should not be invaded as if lands of a sovereign prince.

== Family ==
Ivan IV of Ryazan was married to Princess Agrafena (Agrippina) Vasilyevna Babich-Drutskaya, daughter of Prince Vasily Ivanovich of Drutsk, on July 13, 1485, in Pereyaslavl of Ryazan. The wedding was conducted by the Bishop of Ryazan Simeon. His spouse was related to Polish King Casimir IV through her mother. In the marriage they had a son, Ivan, who succeeded the throne of Ryazan. The latest genealogies claim he had two more sons, Vasily and Fyodor, who are not acknowledged by the respected historians.

Because of the shortcomings of the agreement of 1496, his brother, Prince Fyodor (d. 1503), bequeathed his appanage to Grand Prince of Moscow, Ivan III.
