= Maria of Borovsk =

Grand Princess of Moscow from 1433 to 1462

Maria Yaroslavna of Borovsk
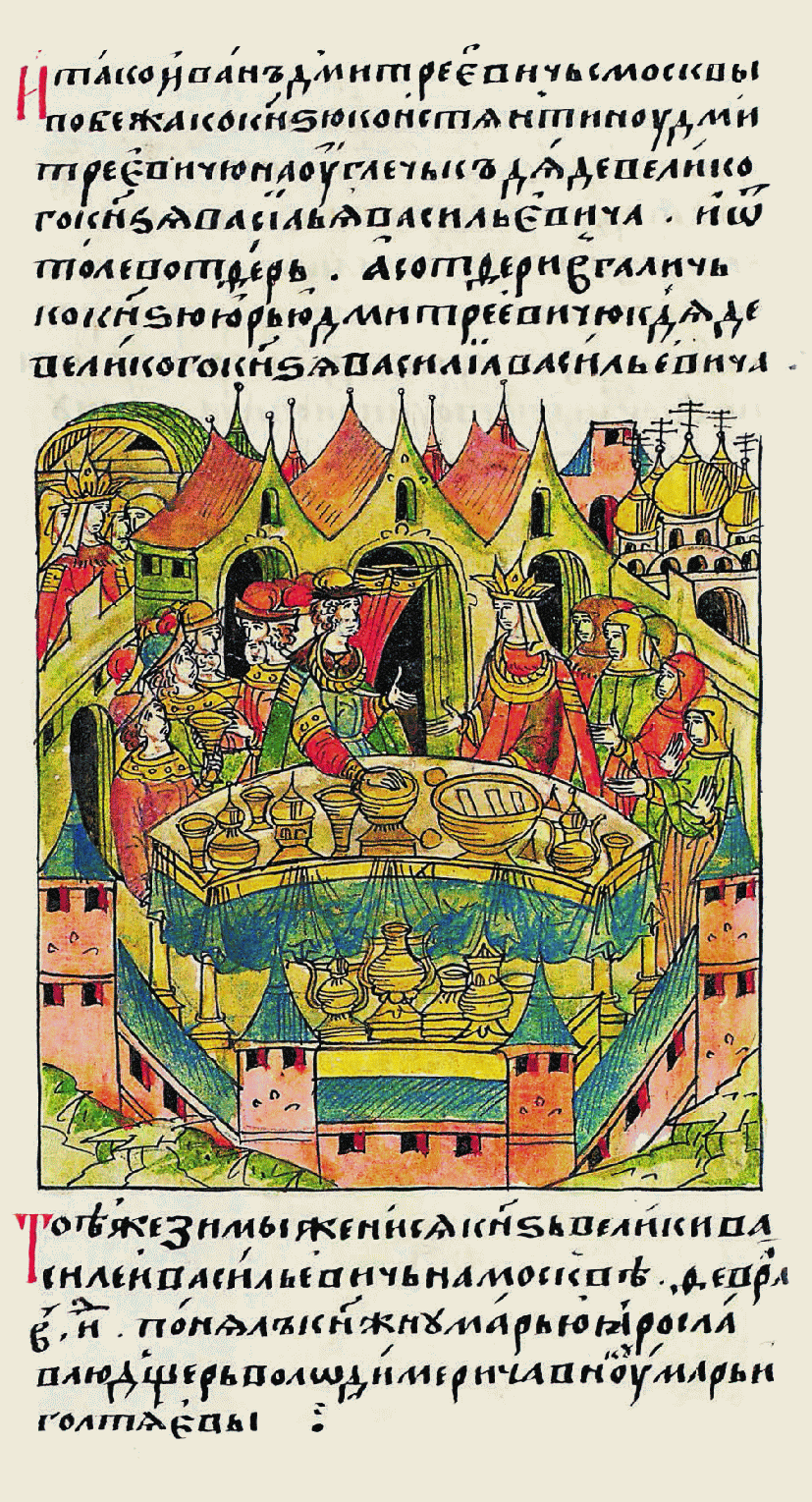
- Wedding of Maria and Vasily II, miniature from the Illustrated Chronicle of Ivan the Terrible

Grand Princess consort of Moscow
- Tenure: 1433 – 24 March 1462
- Predecessor: Sophia of Lithuania
- Successor: Maria of Tver
- Born: c. 1420
- Died: 1485 (aged 64–65)
- Burial: Ascension Convent, Kolomenskoye; Archangel Cathedral, Kremlin (1929)
- Spouse: Vasily II of Moscow
- Issue more...: Ivan III of Russia; Andrey Bolshoy; Anna of Ryazan
- Father: Yaroslav Vladimirovich, Prince of Serpukhov, Borovsk and Maloyaroslavets
- Mother: Maria Feodorovna Goltiayeva Koshkina
- Religion: Russian Orthodox

Maria Yaroslavna of Borovsk (Russian: Мария Ярославна; c. 1420 – 4 July 1485), also known by her monastic name Marfa, was the grand princess of Moscow during her marriage to Vasily II of Moscow. She was a granddaughter of Feodor Koshka, and the mother of Ivan III of Russia.

== Biography ==
Maria Yaroslavna was the daughter of Yaroslav Vladimirovich, the prince of Maloyaroslavets, Borovsk and Serpukhov, and a son of Vladimir the Bold. She was also a granddaughter of Feodor Koshka.

Maria became the grand princess of Moscow in 1433 after her marriage to Vasily II of Moscow. Two years later the sons of Yury of Zvenigorod, Vasily Kosoy and Dmitry Shemyaka, usurped the throne and she was exiled to Galich. With great difficulty, she managed to return to Moscow.

On 12 February 1446, Dmitry Shemyaka with Ioann of Mozhaysk and Boris of Tver attacked Moscow. Maria was captured and put into prison. On 16 February 1446, she was sent into exile to Uglich, together with her husband.

In later years, together with her mother-in-law Sophia of Lithuania, Maria played a significant role in the principality. In order to ingratiate herself with the church, in 1450 she exempted the Trinity Lavra of St. Sergius from taxes, and the Kirillo-Belozersky Monastery in 1471.

After her husband's death she inherited Rostov and Poshekhonye, and some other lands. In 1480, she blessed her son Ivan III of Russia to fight against Khan Ahmed. The fasti mention her as a wise, reasonable woman, and that even as adults, her children sought her advice.

Maria took the veil under the name Marfa in 1482, and died in 1485. At first, she was buried in Starodevichy Convent of the Moscow Kremlin. In 1929, her remains were moved to the Cathedral of the Archangel.

== Children ==
Maria Yaroslavna had 10 children:

1. Yury Bolshoy (lit. 'Yury the Big'; 1437–1441)
2. Ivan III (1440–1505), grand prince of Moscow and all Russia from 1462 to 1505
3. Yury (1441–1472), prince of Dmitrov, Mozhaysk, and Serpukhov
4. Andrey Bolshoy (lit. 'Andrey the Big'; 1446–1493), prince of Uglich, Zvenigorod, and Mozhaysk
5. Simeon (1447–1449)
6. Boris (1449–1494), prince of Volokolamsk and Ruza
7. Anna (died before 1501)
8. Andrey Menshoy (lit. 'Andrey the Young'; 1452–1481), prince of Vologda
9. Dmitry (1455 – before 1461)
10. Maria (died 1465)

Maria of Borovsk Born: c. 1420 – 1485
Russian royalty
Vacant Title last held by Sophia of Lithuania	Grand Princess of Moscow; 1433–1462	Vacant Title next held by Maria of Tver
