= Vasily I of Moscow =

Grand Prince of Moscow from 1389 to 1425

Vasily I
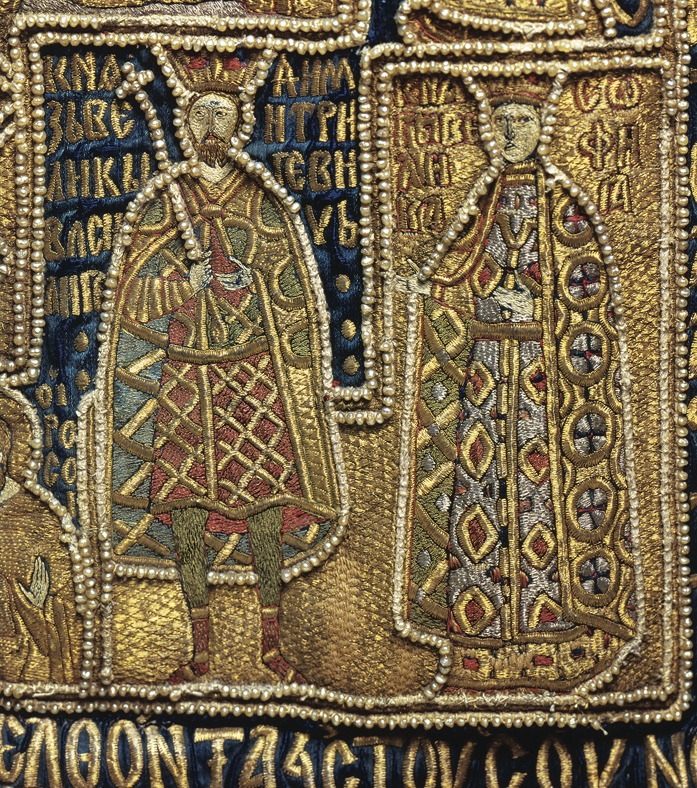
- Vasily I and Sophia of Lithuania on the Large Sakkos of Photius, 1417

Grand Prince of Vladimir and Moscow
- Reign: 19 May 1389 – 27 February 1425
- Predecessor: Dmitry I
- Successor: Vasily II
- Born: 30 December 1371; Moscow, Principality of Moscow
- Died: 27 February 1425 (aged 53); Moscow, Grand Principality of Moscow
- Burial: Archangel Cathedral
- Consort: Sophia of Lithuania
- Issue more...: Anna, Byzantine Empress; Vasily II of Moscow
- Dynasty: Rurik
- Father: Dmitry Donskoy
- Mother: Eudoxia Dmitriyevna
- Religion: Russian Orthodox

Vasily I Dmitriyevich (Russian: Василий I Дмитриевич; 30 December 1371 – 27 February 1425) was Grand Prince of Vladimir and Moscow from 1389. He was the heir of Dmitry Donskoy, who reigned from 1359 to 1389.

He entered an alliance with the Grand Duchy of Lithuania in 1392 and married Sophia, the only daughter of Vytautas, though the alliance turned out to be fragile, and they waged war against each other in 1406–1408.

The raid on the Volga region in 1395 by the Turco-Mongol emir Timur resulted in a state of anarchy for the Golden Horde and the independence of Moscow. In 1412, Vasily resumed submission to the Horde.

== Family and early life ==
Vasily was the oldest son of Dmitry Donskoy and Grand Princess Eudoxia, daughter of Grand Prince Dmitry Konstantinovich of Nizhny Novgorod.

== Reign ==
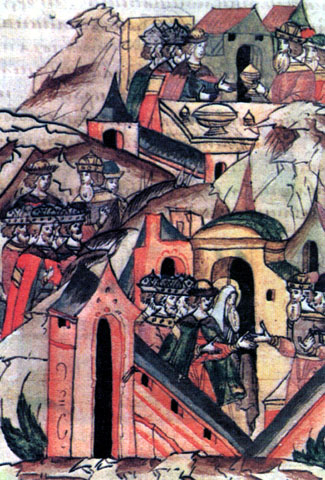
Vasily I visiting his father-in-law, Vytautas the Great.

While still a young man, Vasily, who was the eldest son of Grand Prince Dmitry Donskoy (ruled Moscow 1359–1389), travelled to the Tatar khan Tokhtamysh (1383) to obtain the Khan's yarlik (patent) for his father for the title of grand prince of Vladimir. Diplomatically overcoming the challenge of the prince of Tver, who also sought the patent, Vasily succeeded in his mission. But he was subsequently kept at Tokhtamysh's court as a hostage until 1386 when, taking advantage of Tokhtamysh's conflict with his suzerain Timur Lenk (Tamerlane), he escaped and returned to Moscow.

With Tokhtamysh's permission, Vasily I took over Nizhny Novgorod-Suzdal in 1393. Nizhny Novgorod was given to Vasily by the Khan of the Golden Horde in exchange for the help Moscow had given against one of his rivals. He also took Murom. In 1397–1398 Kaluga, Vologda, Veliki Ustyug and the lands of the Komi peoples were annexed.

To prevent Muscovy from being attacked by the Golden Horde, Vasily I entered into an alliance with the Grand Duchy of Lithuania in 1392 and married Sophia of Lithuania, the only daughter of Vytautas the Great. The alliance turned out to be fragile, and they waged war against each other in 1406–1408. Vytautas had positioned himself as an unifier of all Rus’ lands, the Polish historian Koneczny spoke of the potentiality "that could have been realised had the program of the subjugation of all of Rus’ been implemented". Furthermore, he saw the potential of the Grand Duchy of Lithuania becoming an empire by virtue of all of Rus’ being under Lithuanian domination. Vytautas, thus attacked Novgorod and Pskov, clashing with his son-in-law Vasily but later making peace. This peace allowed Vytautas to strike against the Teutonic order at the Battle of Grunwald. However, the terms of the Union of Horodlo negotiated by Polish King Jogaila, which discriminated against Orthodox Christians, caused Lithuania to lose its influence over the Russian states.

Mongol emir Timur raided the Slavic lands in 1395; he ruined the Volga region but did not penetrate as far as Moscow. Timur's raid was of service to the Muscovite prince as it damaged the Golden Horde, which for the next twelve years was in a state of anarchy. During the whole of this time no tribute was paid to the khan, Olug Moxammat, though vast sums of money were collected in the Moscow treasury for military purposes.

In 1408 Edigu burnt Nizhny Novgorod, Gorodets, Rostov, and many other towns but failed to take Moscow, though he had still burnt it. In 1412, however, Vasily found it necessary to pay the long-deferred visit of submission to the Horde.

The growing influence of Moscow abroad was underlined by the fact that Vasily married his daughter Anna to Emperor John VIII Palaeologus of Byzantium.

== Domestic policy ==
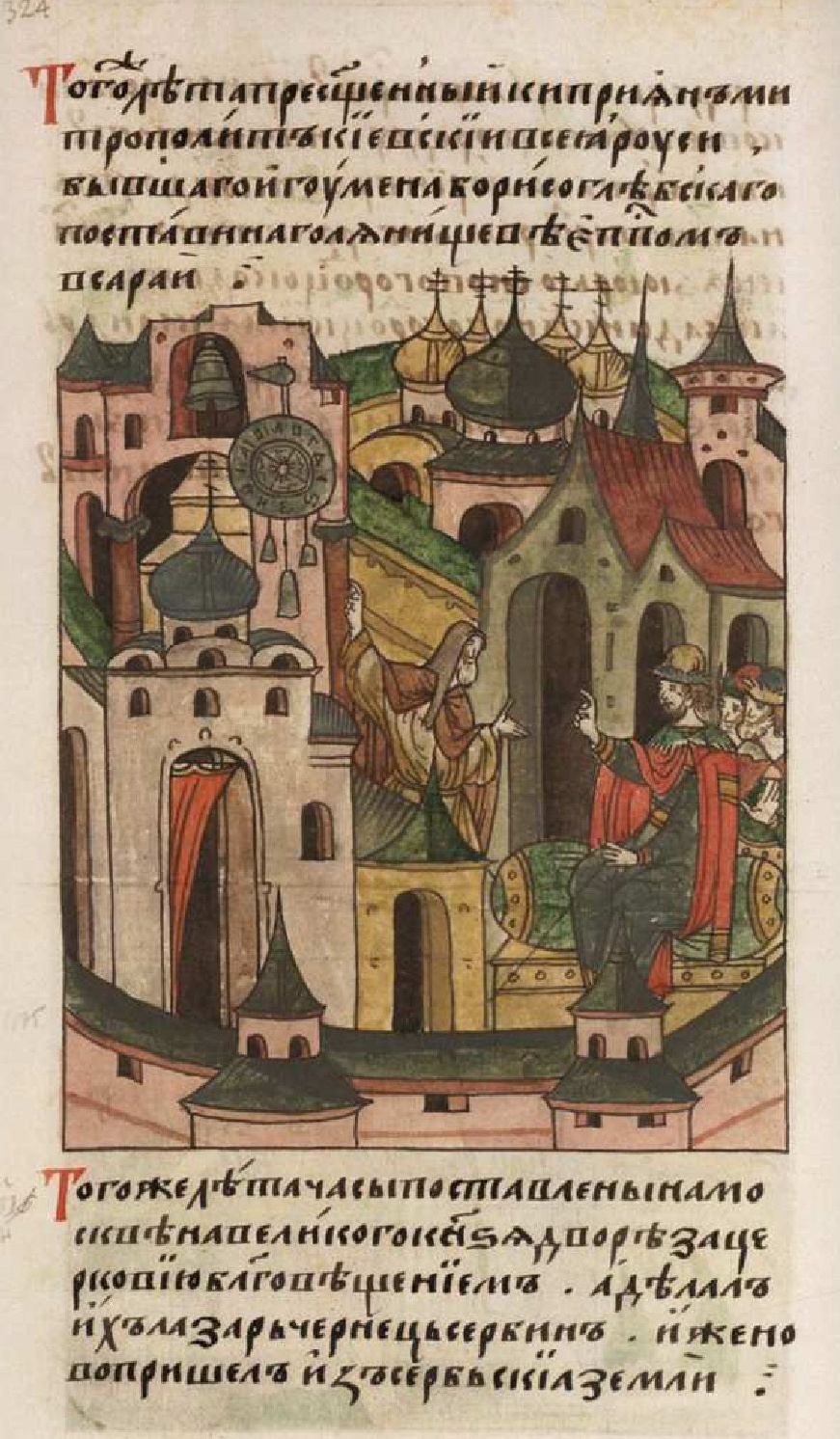
Lazar the Serb showing Vasily the clock.

During his reign, feudal landownership kept growing. With the growth of princely authority in Moscow, the judicial powers of landowners were partially diminished and transferred to Vasily's deputies and heads of volosts.

Chronicles speak of a monk called Lazar the Serb who arrived from Serbia, inventing and building a clock on a tower in the Grand Prince's Terem Palace in Moscow behind the Cathedral of the Annunciation at the request of Vasily I, in 1404. It was the first ever mechanical clock in Moscow and the first in any Russian city. It was among the first ten such advanced clocks in Europe, and was regarded as a technical miracle at the time.

The most important ecclesiastical event of the reign was the elevation of the Bulgarian, Gregory Tsamblak, to the metropolitan see of Kiev by Vytautas, grand-duke of Lithuania; the immediate political consequence of which was the weakening of the hold of Moscow on southwestern Rus'.

== Marriage and children ==
Vasily married Sophia of Lithuania, the only child of Vytautas the Great and his wife, Anna. They had nine known children, five boys (of which only one survived to mature adulthood) and four girls:

- Anna of Moscow (1393 – August 1417), wife of John VIII Palaiologos, died of bubonic plague;
- Yury Vasilievich (30 March 1395 – 30 November 1400);
- Ivan Vasilievich (15 January 1397 – 20 July 1417), died on the way from Kolomna to Moscow as a result of "pestilence", just six months after marrying the daughter of Prince Ivan Vladimirovich of Pronsk and receiving the inheritance of Nizhny Novgorod;
- Anastasia Vasilievna (d. 1470), wife of Vladymir Alexander, Prince of Kiev. Her husband was a son of Vladymir, Prince of Kiev. His paternal grandparents were Algirdas and Maria of Vitebsk;
- Daniil Vasilievich (6 December 1400 – May 1402), died of pestilence;
- Vasilisa Vasilievna, wife of Alexander Ivanovich "Brukhaty", Prince of Suzdal, and Alexander Daniilovich "Vzmetenj", Prince of Suzdal;
- Simeon Vasilievich (13 January – 7 April 1405), died of pestilence;
- Maria Vasilievna, wife of Yuri Patrikievich. Her husband was a son of Patrikas, Prince of Starodub, and his wife, Helena. His paternal grandfather was Narimantas;
- Vasily II of Moscow (10 March 1415 – 27 March 1462).

Sophia also suffered many miscarriages:

- A miscarriage of a daughter in the 4th month of pregnancy (19 December 1391);
- A miscarriage of a daughter in the 6th month of pregnancy (16 August 1392);
- A miscarriage in the 1st month of pregnancy (22 January 1394);
- A miscarriage of a son in the 4th and a half-month of pregnancy (17 January 1396);
- A miscarriage in the 1st month of pregnancy (4 December 1398);
- A miscarriage in the 1st month of pregnancy (30 January 1399);
- A miscarriage in the 1st month of pregnancy (30 March 1401);
- A miscarriage of a son in the 5th and a half-month of pregnancy (11 January 1403);
- A miscarriage of a son in the 4th and a half-month of pregnancy (20 March 1406);
- A miscarriage in 1410;
- A miscarriage in 1412;
- A miscarriage in 1414;
- A miscarriage in 1416;
- A miscarriage in 1418;
- A miscarriage in 1420.

== See also ==
- Bibliography of Russian history (1223–1613)
- Family tree of Russian monarchs

== Bibliography ==
- Halperin, Charles J. (1987). Russia and the Golden Horde - The Mongol Impact on Medieval Russian History. p. 222. ISBN 9781850430575. (e-book).

Regnal titles
Preceded by Dmitry Donskoy	Grand Prince of Moscow; 1389–1425	Succeeded by Vasily II
