= Pronsk =

Set index of articles associated with the same name

Pronsk (Russian: Пронск) is the name of several inhabited localities in Ryazan Oblast, Russia.

Urban localities

- Pronsk, Pronsky District, Ryazan Oblast, a work settlement in Pronsky District

Rural localities

- Pronsk, Ukholovsky District, Ryazan Oblast, a selo in Konoplinsky Rural Okrug of Ukholovsky District
