= Vasily II of Moscow =

Grand Prince of Moscow from 1425 to 1462

Vasily II
- Sovereign of all Russia
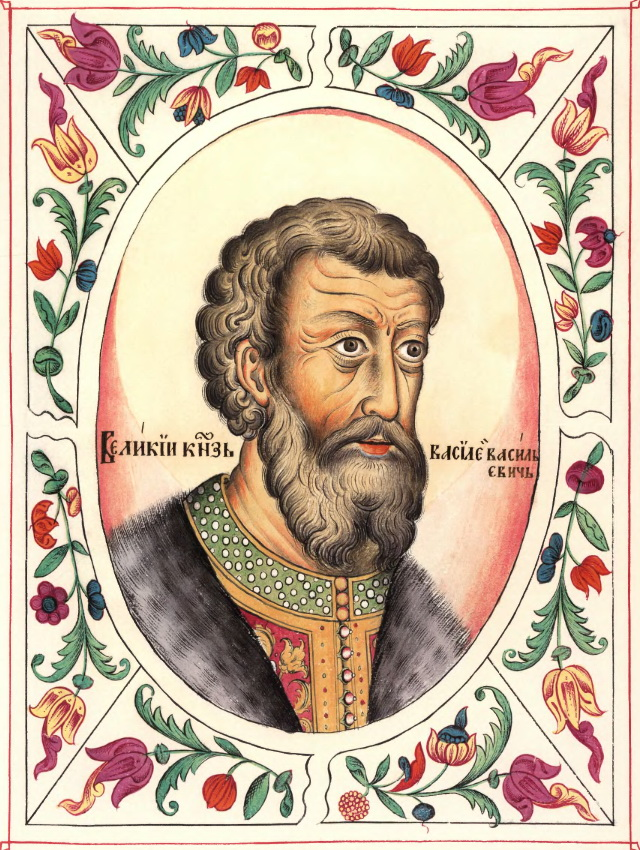
- Portrait in the Tsarskiy titulyarnik (1672)

Grand Prince of Moscow
- Reign: 27 February 1425 – 27 March 1462 (disputed from 1425 to 1453)
- Predecessor: Vasily I
- Successor: Ivan III
- Born: 10 March 1415; Moscow, Grand Principality of Moscow
- Died: 27 March 1462 (aged 47); Moscow
- Consort: Maria Yaroslavna
- Issue: Ivan Vasilyevich; Anna Vasilyevna; Andrey Bolshoy
- Dynasty: Rurik
- Father: Vasily I of Moscow
- Mother: Sophia of Lithuania
- Religion: Russian Orthodox

Vasily II Vasilyevich (Note: Also transcribed as Vasili or Vasilii;) (Russian: Василий II Васильевич; 10 March 1415 – 27 March 1462), nicknamed the Blind or the Dark (Russian: Тёмный), was Grand Prince of Moscow from 1425 until his death in 1462.

He succeeded his father, Vasily I, only to be challenged by his uncle Yuri of Zvenigorod. (Note: "When Dmitrii Donskoi composed his will, his son Vasilii had yet to produce a son of his own. Therefore Donskoi named his second son, Yurii, as Vasilii's heir. Subsequently Vasilii did indeed father a son, Vasilii II, whose accession to the throne was challenged by his uncle Yurii.") During this time, Moscow changed hands several times. At one point, Vasily was captured and blinded by his cousin Dmitry Shemyaka in 1446. The final victory went to Vasily, who was supported by most people. Due to his disability, he made his son Ivan III his co-ruler in his later years.

== Reign ==
=== First ten years of struggle ===
Vasily II was the youngest son of Vasily I of Moscow by Sophia of Lithuania, the only daughter of Vytautas the Great, and the only son to survive his father (his elder brother Ivan died in 1417 at the age of 22). On his father's death Vasily II was proclaimed Grand Duke at the age of 10. His mother acted as a regent. His uncle, Yuri of Zvenigorod (the prince of Galich-Mersky), and his two sons, Vasily Kosoy ("the Cross-Eyed") and Dmitry Shemyaka, seized on the opportunity to advance their own claims to the throne. These claims were based on the Testament of Dmitry Donskoy, Yuri's father and Vasily II's grandfather, who had stated that if Vasily I died Yuri would succeed his appanage. However, Dmitri had written the testament when Vasily I had no children of his own, and it might be argued that this provision had been made only for the case of Vasily I's childless death. Vasily II's claim was supported by Vytautas, his maternal grandfather.

Upon Vytautas' death in 1430, Yuri went to the Golden Horde, returning with a license to take the Moscow throne. But the Khan did not support him any further, largely due to the devices of the Smolensk princeling and Moscow boyarin Ivan Vsevolzhsky. When Yuri assembled an army and attacked Moscow, Vasily II, betrayed by Vsevolzhsky, was defeated and captured by his enemies in 1433. Upon being proclaimed the grand prince of Moscow, Yuri pardoned his nephew and sent him to reign in the town of Kolomna. That proved to be a mistake, as Vasily II immediately started to plot against his uncle and gather all sorts of malcontents. Feeling how insecure his throne was, Yuri resigned and then left Moscow for his northern hometown. When Vasily II returned to Moscow, he had Vsevolzhsky blinded as a traitor.

Meanwhile, Yuri's claim was inherited by his sons, who decided to continue the fight. They managed to defeat Vasily II, who had to seek refuge in the Golden Horde. After Yuri died in 1434, Vasili the Cross-Eyed entered the Kremlin and was proclaimed new Grand Duke. Dmitry Shemyaka, who had his own plans for the throne, quarreled with his brother and concluded an alliance with Vasily II. Together, they managed to banish Vasily the Cross-Eyed from the Kremlin in 1435. The latter was captured and blinded, which effectively removed him from the contest for the throne.

=== Kazan and Shemyaka ===
During Vasily II's reign, the Golden Horde collapsed and broke up into smaller Khanates. Now that his throne was relatively secure, he had to deal with the Tatar threat. In 1439, Vasily II had to flee the capital when it was besieged by Ulugh Muhammad, ruler of the nascent Kazan Khanate. Six years later, he personally led his troops against Ulugh Muhammad, but was defeated and taken prisoner. The Russians were forced to gather an enormous ransom for their prince, so that Vasily II could be released some five months later.

During that time, the control of Moscow passed to Dmitry Shemyaka. Keeping in mind the fate of his own brother, Dmitry had Vasily II blinded and exiled him to Uglich, in 1446; hence, Vasily II's nickname, "the blind". As Vasily II still had a number of supporters in Moscow, Dmitry recalled him from exile and gave him Vologda as an appanage. That proved to be a mistake, as Vasily II quickly assembled his supporters and regained the throne.

Vasily II's final victory against his cousin came in the 1450s, when he captured Galich-Mersky and poisoned Dmitry. The latter's children managed to escape to Lithuania. These events finally put to rest the principle of collateral succession, which was a major cause of medieval internecine struggles, and was a definitive victory for the principle of succession from father to son as against the previous practice. This also paved the way for political centralization of power, which was popular in the country at the time.

=== Later reign and policies ===
Now that the war was over, Vasily II eliminated almost all of the small appanages in Moscow principality, so as to strengthen his sovereign authority. His military campaigns of 1441–1460 increased Moscow's hold over Suzdal, the Vyatka lands, and the republican governments of Novgorod and Pskov.

In the meantime, Constantinople fell to the Turks, and the patriarch agreed to acknowledge the supremacy of the Pope in the Council of Florence. After the death of Photius in 1431, he was replaced by Isidore as metropolitan, a nominee of Byzantium, who took part in the Council of Florence. Upon his return to Moscow, he was dismissed and imprisoned by Vasily, who was opposed to any agreement with western Catholicism. In 1448, a council of Russian bishops elected Jonah as the metropolitan of the Russian Orthodox Church, which was tantamount to declaration of independence from the patriarch of Constantinople. This move further strengthened Moscow's reputation among Orthodox states.

Vasily also adopted the title of sovereign of all Russia when he returned to the throne, taking inspiration from his uncle Dmitry, and began issuing coins with the title. The Muscovites began developing an identity of the grand prince as the sovereign and the ruler of all the Russian lands, and Vasily positioned himself as the defender of Orthodoxy.

In his later years, the blind prince was greatly helped by Metropolitan Jonah, boyars, and then by his older son Ivan III who was styled as co-ruler since the late 1450s. On Vasily II's death in 1462, Ivan III succeeded him as the grand prince of Moscow. Vasily's daughter Anna was married to a prince of Ryazan.

== See also ==
- Bibliography of Russian history (1223–1613)
- Family tree of Russian monarchs

== Bibliography ==
- Alef, Gustave (1956). A history of the Muscovite civil war: the reign of Vasili II (1425–1462) (PhD).
- Halperin, Charles J. (1987). Russia and the Golden Horde - The Mongol Impact on Medieval Russian History. Indiana University. p. 222. ISBN 9781850430575. (e-book).

Regnal titles
Preceded by Vasily I	Grand Prince of Moscow; 1425–1433	Succeeded by Yury Dmitrievich
Preceded by Vasiliy Kosoy	Grand Prince of Moscow; 1435–1446	Succeeded by Dmitry Shemyaka
Preceded by Dmitry Shemyaka	Grand Prince of Moscow; 1447–1462	Succeeded by Ivan III
