= Sophia (TV series) =

- Genre: Historical drama; Serial drama
- Created by: Moskino filming company
- Directed by: Aleksei Andrianov
- Starring: Mariya Andreyeva; Yevgeny Tsyganov; Nadezhda Markina; Pyotr Zaychenko; Boris Nevzorov
- Composer: Artyom Vasiliev
- Country of origin: Russia
- Original language: Russian
- No. of seasons: 1
- No. of episodes: 8

Production
- Running time: 52 minutes

Original release
- Network: Russia 1
- Release: 28 November – 1 December 2016

Sophia (Russian: Софи́я, romanized: Sofíya) is a Russian historical drama television series about Sophia Palaiologina, Grand Duchess of Moscow. The film was directed by Aleksei Andrianov, and produced by film company "Moskino" (Russian: Москино) with the financial support of the Ministry of Culture of Russia and Ministry of Defence of Russia.

== Plot ==
Setting: the second half of the 15th century. The head of the Duchy of Moscow, Ivan III, accepts an offer from ambassadors to Rome to marry princess Zoe of the ancient Byzantine Palaiologos family. He sends voivode Khromoy and monetary master Ivan Fryazin to Rome, who bring Zoe to Moscow, where she takes a new name after rebaptism – Sophia. She does not meet the expectations of the Pope to expand the influence of the Catholic Church in Russia. The attempts to send emissaries with the aim of urging Sophia to follow the line of Rome and further killing her end in failure. The most notable moments of Ivan III's rule are shown, including: the war with Novgorod Republic, disagreement and later peace with Ivan's brothers (Boris and Andrey Bolshoy), victory over the Golden Horde, and also the opposition of Sophia to Elena, the wife of Ivan's elder son.

== Cast ==
- Mariya Andreyeva as Sophia Palaiologina, Grand Duchess of Moscow
- Yevgeny Tsyganov as Ivan III, Grand Duke of Moscow
- Nadezhda Markina as Maria Yaroslavna, Grand Duchess of Moscow, Ivan III's mother
- Pyotr Zaychenko as Philip I, metropolitan of Moscow and all Rus' (this character is a composite character based on personalities of metropolitans Philip II (died 5 April 1473) and Gerontius of Moscow (died 28 May 1489), more on the last's)
- Boris Nevzorov as Grigoriy Mamonov, boyar and okolnichy in the court of Grand Duchy of Moscow
- Giuliano Di Capua as Ivan Fryazin, monetary master, diplomat, adventurer
- Ilya Ilyinykh as Ivan the Young, the elder son of Ivan III, the heir of throne
- Nikolay Kozak as Fyodor Khromy, voivode and boyar in the service of Grand Duchy of Moscow
- Miriam Sekhon as Laura, assistant of Sophia Palaiologina
- Sofia Nikitchuk as Elena Voloshanka, Ivan the Young's wife
- Anatoliy Uzdenskiy as Fyodor Kuritsyn, Duma's dyak, chronicler and treasurer in the court of Ivan III
- Aleksandr Baluev as Stephen the Great, hospodar of Moldavia
- Sergei Puskepalis as Casimir IV Jagiellon, Grand Duke of Lithuania
- Amadu Mamadakov as Ahmed, Khan of the Great Horde
- Ivan Kolesnikov as Yuriy, knyaz of Dmitrov, Ivan III's younger brother
- Sergei Marin as Andrey Bolshoy, knyaz of Uglich, Ivan III's younger brother
- Ivan Vakulenko as Boris, knyaz of Volok, Ivan III's younger brother
- Konstantin Topolaga as knyaz Daniil of Kholm, warlord
- Pvel Sborshchikov as knyaz Vasiliy Nozdrovaty-Zvenigorodsky, warlord
- Lidia Bayrashevskaya as Marfa Boretskaya, mayoress of Novgorod
- Nikolay Shrayber as knyaz Vasiliy Grebyonksa-Shuysky, warlord of Novgorod
- Boris Tokarev as Aristotele Fioravanti, Italian architect
- Andrey Barilo as Andreas Palaiologos, Sophia's brother
- Kirill Kozakov as Antonio Bonombra, papal legate
- Semyon Treskunov as young Ivan IV son of Vasiliy, future "Tsar of All the Russias"
- Yuriy Nazarov as Macarius, Ivan the Terrible's mentor, metropolitan
- Egor Koreshkov as Pietro
- Sergey Borisov as Godynya, head sword-bearer of Grand Duchy
- Andrey Evdokimov as Syomka Khvost, sword-bearer of Grand Duchy
- Maksim Radugin as Sergio

== Production ==
The series' pilot name was Sophia Palaiologina (Russian: Софи́я Палеоло́г). Filming started in November 2014 and was set abroad — in Italy and the Czech Republic, and in Russia in Moscow Kremlin and Pskov Krom, and also in Pskov, Moscow and Kaluga Oblast, Borovsk, Novgorod, Astrakhan and Pskov. The decorations of the Moscow Kremlin were built for the filming in the territory of VDNKh, which matched its historical 15th century image (then it did not have the familiar red colour, but was white). Also, the decorations of the Dormition Cathedral were built. Property men found antique tableware of that time specially for the series. Golden coins for the series were minted from the original ducats. Over a thousand costumes were made for the project. Thousands of Russians attended an exhibition of the creations for this TV project.

== Airing and streaming ==
The series premiered on 28 November 2016 on Russia 1. From 28 November to 1 December, the series aired from 21:00 to 23:00 in UTC+3 (2 episodes). According to the site Vokrug TV, Sophia was one of the main premieres of the autumn 2016. The series is available for viewing in the U.S. via Amazon Prime Video.

== Soundtrack ==
The song Я тебе верю (I Believe You) from the series' opening sequence was performed by singer Grigory Leps. The music was written by Igor Matvienko, and lyrics by Dzhakhan Pollyeva.
