= Ivanovich =

Ivanovich may refer to:

- A transliteration of the East Slavic surname Ivanović
- Ivanovich (patronymic)
