= Ivanovich (patronymic) =

Personal names

Ivanovich (Ukrainian: Ivanovych, Belarusian: Ivanavich, Polish: Iwanowycz) is a patronymic in the traditional three-partite East Slavic personal name with the structure "given name–patronymic–surname". It literally means "son of Ivan". In the past, before the introduction of surnames, notable East Slavic people were referred by their given name plus patronymic. A number of historical or otherwise notable people referred by "given name plus Ivanovich" include:

- Dmitry Ivanovich (disambiguation), several people
- Ivan Ivanovich, several people
- Vasily Ivanovich, several people

== See also ==
- Ivanović, South Slavic surname that may also be transliterated as Ivanovich
- Ivanovici
- Ivanovitch
