= Sovereign of all Russia =

Monarch during a period of Russian history

- Seal of the Sovereign (1475)

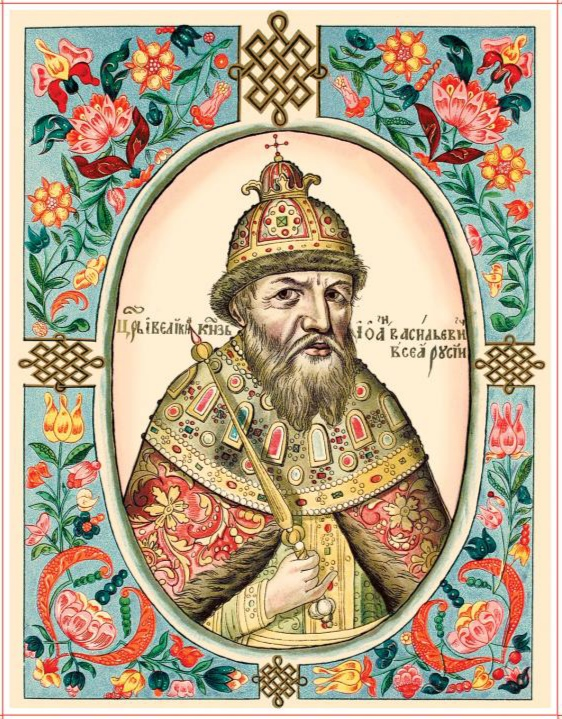
- Last to Reign; Ivan IV

Details
- Last monarch: Ivan IV
- Formed: 12 February 1446
- Appointer: Hereditary

The Sovereign of all Russia, (Note: Russian: Государь всея Руси, originally: Господарь всея Руси) also the Sovereign and Grand Prince of all Russia, (Note: Also rendered as Sovereign and Grand Prince of all Rus') (Note: Russian: Государь и Великий Князь всея Руси) was a title used by the grand princes of Moscow. The title was later changed to sovereign, tsar and grand prince.

== History ==
Dmitry Shemyaka used the title sovereign from 1446 and issued coinage with the title. After his brother Vasily II returned to Moscow and took back the title of grand prince of Moscow, he also adopted the title of sovereign and began issuing coins with the title.

Following the expansion of his realm and his marriage to Sophia Palaiologina, the grand prince Ivan III took the title of sovereign and claimed inheritance to all the former territories of Kievan Rus', including those under Lithuanian control. His full title was: Ivan, by the Grace of God, the Sovereign of all Russia and the Grand Prince of Vladimir, and Moscow, and Novgorod, and Pskov, and Tver, and Yugorsk, and Perm, and Bulgar and others. In diplomatic correspondence, the Latinized version of his title gospodar' vseia Rusi was dominus totius Russiae.

The unification of the Russian principalities during his reign and the end of the "Mongol yoke" in Russia cultivated a sense of an imperial role for the Muscovite grand prince as the ruler of all Russia. Ivan III also used the title of tsar in foreign correspondence, especially as there was no longer a tsar in Constantinople. Ivan had his grandson Dmitry crowned as grand prince using the crown of Monomakh for the first time, an item of Russian regalia that would be used to strengthen the claim of Moscow as the heir to the Byzantine Empire, though Dmitry would never reign.
