= Viktor Muyzhel =

Russian writer

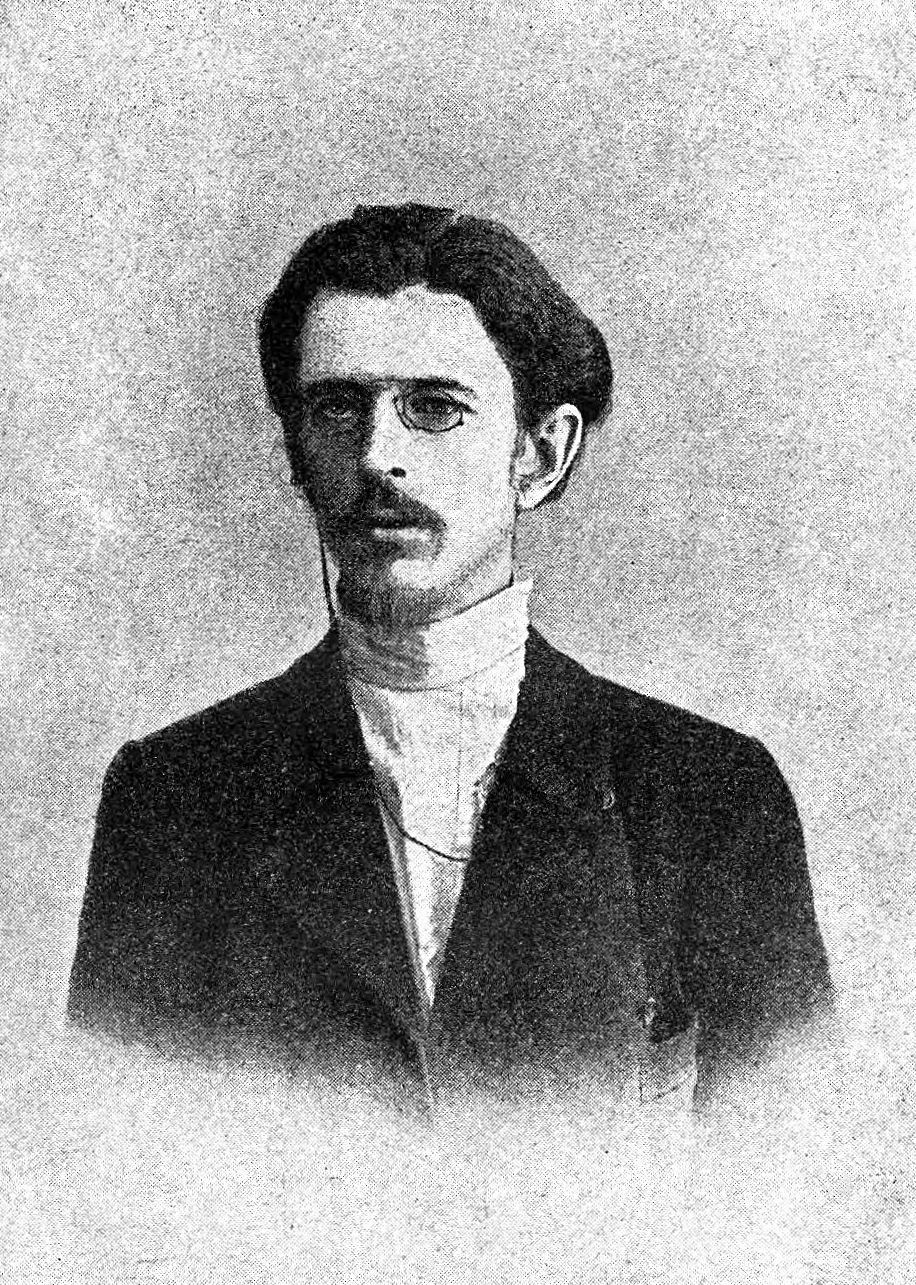
- Born: July 30, 1880; Uza, Pskov Governorate, Russian Empire
- Died: January 18, 1932 (aged 67); Leningrad, Soviet Union

Viktor Vasilyevich Muyzhel (Russian: Ви́ктор Васи́льевич Муйжель; July 30, 1880 - February 3, 1924) was a writer and painter.

== Biography ==
Muyzhel was born in the village of Uza, Pskov Governorate (present-day Porkhovsky District, Pskov Oblast). His father was a minor official. Muyzhel's first published work appeared in 1903. The Russian countryside is the setting for most of his works of fiction, including his novel The Year (1911). He was influenced by Narodnik ideology and in many of his works depicted peasant unrest. Some of Muyzhel's works detail the stagnant bourgeois way of life in pre-revolutionary Russia.

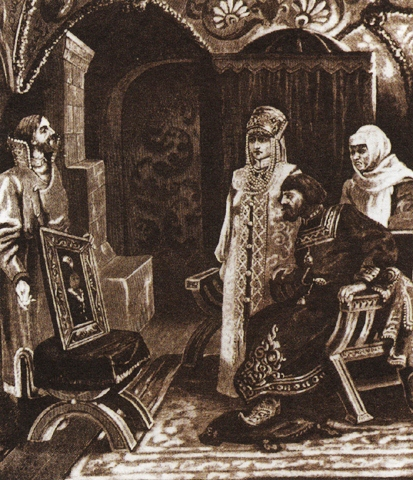
Ivan III and portrait of Sophia Palaiologina by Viktor Muyzhel.

After the Russian Revolution of 1917, Muyzhel wrote short stories, novellas, and the play Spring Wind (1923). Muyzhel's works were published in popular journals; his early works were published in Russkoye Bogatstvo, and his later works were published in Maxim Gorky's Znanie collections.
