= Dmitry Ivanovich =

Dmitry Ivanovich is an appellation composed of the given name and patronymic (see Eastern Slavic naming customs). Notable people commonly referred to as "Dmitry Ivanovich" include:

- Dmitry Donskoy (1350–1389), Dmitri Ivanovich Donskoy, Grand Prince of Moscow between 1359 and 1389
- Dmitri Ivanovich (1481–1521), Prince of Uglich and son of Ivan III of Moscow
- Dmitry Ivanovich (grandson of Ivan III) (1483–1509), heir to the Russian throne, son of Ivan the Young and grandson of Ivan III of Moscow
- Tsarevich Dmitry Ivanovich of Russia (1552–1553), eldest son and heir of Ivan the Terrible
- Tsarevich Dmitry Ivanovich of Russia (born 1582) (Dmitry of Uglich), youngest son of Ivan the Terrible
