= Maria Borisova =

Maria Borisova may refer to:

- Maria Borisovna of Tver (1442–1467), grand princess of Moscow
- Maria Borisova (water polo) (born 1997), Russian water polo player
- Maria Borisova (gymnast) (born 2007), Russian gymnast
