= Igor Ivanović =

Igor Ivanović may refer to:

- Igor Ivanović (Montenegrin footballer) (born 1990), Montenegrin footballer
- Igor Ivanović (Serbian footballer) (born 1997), Serbian footballer

== See also ==
- Ivanović
