= Ivan Fryazin =

15th-century Italian-born Russian diplomat

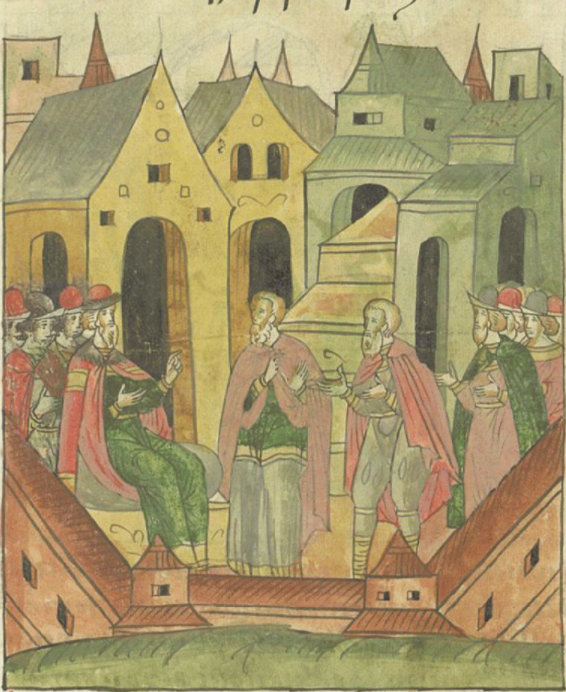
Ivan Fryazin and Gianbattista Trevisan at the court of Ivan III, miniature from the Illustrated Chronicle of Ivan the Terrible

Gianbattista della Volpe, commonly known as Ivan Fryazin (Russian: Иван Фрязин), was an Italian-born diplomat and traveler in Russian service during the reigns of Vasily II and Ivan III.

== Career ==
Gianbattista della Volpe was a member of the civic elite in the town of Vicenza, in the Republic of Venice. He left for Caffa in 1445 and reached Moscow no later than 1459. This is evident from a will written by his sister, which divided her inheritance equally among her brothers, though she kept Gianbattista's share until his return from Russia.

After arriving in Russia, he received the nickname Ivan Fryazin (from fryazin – the Russian name for 'Frank'). There, he persuaded Grand Prince Vasily II of Moscow to appoint him master of the mint. It also appears that Volpe converted to Orthodoxy, married a local woman, and learned enough Russian to serve as a translator. Volpe appears to have encouraged other Italians to move to Russia, and by the early 1460s, an Italian from Lombardy, Giovanni de Cernusco, had arrived, apparently on the recommendation of the duke of Milan. In 1463, Volpe sent a messenger to Milan with samples of the gold coins he had minted.

Ivan III later authorized Volpe with recruiting additional Italian experts, and in 1468, Volpe sent his nephew Nicolò Gislardi and a Greek named Iouri to Italy. In Rome, they were treated as ambassadors of Ivan III. Before leaving, they were entrusted with a letter to the grand prince, proposing a marriage with Zoe Palaiologina in the hopes that the Russians would recognize Rome and join the fight against the Ottomans. The Russian chronicles do not explain why Ivan III accepted this offer. Nonetheless, Volpe and one of his nephews returned to Rome in 1470 to arrange the marriage. There, Volpe was given a portrait of Zoe and instructed to return with members of the Russian nobility for the wedding to take place. His nephew, Antonio Gislardi, told the Venetian senate that he could serve as an intermediary for organizing an alliance between the Russians and Tatars against the Ottomans.

After their return to Moscow, Pope Paul II died, and so when the Russian delegation arrived in Rome again, they made arrangements with Pope Sixtus IV. An Italian nobleman, Gianbattista Trevisan, was sent to Russia to negotiate with the Tatars. In Moscow, Volpe, for unknown reasons, convinced him to say that he was one of his nephews, rather than reveal his true purpose. In Rome, preparations for the wedding took place in June 1472. Ivan III and Zoe were married by proxy, and after Zoe's arrival in Russia later that year, another wedding took place in November. Ivan III learned of Trevisan's true identity, leading him to exile Volpe to Kolomna and order the sacking of his house. Despite Volpe's fall from grace, his relatives continued to prosper.

== Sources ==
- "Фрязин, Иван" . Brockhaus and Efron Encyclopedic Dictionary (in Russian). 1906.
- "Вольпе, Джан-Баттиста" . Brockhaus and Efron Encyclopedic Dictionary (in Russian). 1906.
- Bushkovitch, Paul (18 March 2021). Succession to the Throne in Early Modern Russia: The Transfer of Power 1450–1725. Cambridge University Press. ISBN 978-1-108-47934-9.
- Welch, Evelyn (2006). "Between Italy and Moscow: cultural crossroads". In Muchembled, Robert; Monter, William (eds.). Cultural Exchange in Early Modern Europe. Cambridge University Press. ISBN 978-0-521-84549-6.
