= Alexandru of Moldavia =

First-born son of Stephen III of Moldavia

Alexandru (born between 1464 and 1466 - died on 26 July 1496) was the first-born son of Stephen III of Moldavia and his first wife Evdochia of Kiev. He participated in his father's fights against the Ottoman Empire and Wallachia from the late 1470s. He had his own court in Bacău from the early 1480s. He was made Stephen III's co-ruler in or before 1490. He predeceased his father.

== Early life ==
Alexandru was the first-born son of Stephen III of Moldavia. His mother's identification is uncertain, because she may have been either one Mărușca (or Mărica), or Evdochia of Kiev, according to historian Jonathan Eagles. Assuming that Mărușca was Stephen's concubine, Eagles proposes that Alexandru could have been an illegitimate son. On the other hand, Stephen's charter of grant to the Hilandar Monastery on Mount Athos names Alexandru as one of the children of Stephen and Evdochia of Kiev. Consequently, according to Eagles, it is also possible, that Stephen fathered two sons named Alexandru, and his co-ruler was Evdochia's son. If Alexandru was Mărușca's son, he must have been born between 1457 and 1463; if Evdochia was his mother, he must have been born between 1464 and 1466, as Stephen married to Evdochia in 1463 and Alexandru was their first child. The second child, Alexandru's sister Elena, or Olena, being born before Evdochia's death in 1467, places Alexandru's birth not later than 1466.

Alexandru participated in the Battle of Valea Albă in 1476, according to an inscription at the Church of Saint Michael in Războieni. An inscription at the Church of Saint Procopius in Milișăuți recorded that Alexandru also fought alongside his father against Basarab the Younger at Râmnicu Vâlcea in 1481. Around that time, Alexandru, established his own court at Bacău. He allegedly administered the Lower Country (the southern region of Moldavia), according to Eagles. In the 1480s, he only referred to himself as his father's son, showing that he was still not regarded his father's co-ruler.

== Co-ruler ==
Alexandru was made his father's co-ruler before 1 January 1491. On this day he was styled voivode on an inscription at the church of the Dormition of the Mother of God in Bacău. The church had been built at Alexandru's order. He died on 26 July 1496. He was buried in the Bistrița Monastery.

== Sources ==
- Eagles, Jonathan (2014). Stephen the Great and Balkan Nationalism: Moldova and Eastern European History. I.B. Tauris. ISBN 978-1-78076-353-8.
- Păun, Radu G. (2016). "Mount Athos and the Byzantine-Slavic Tradition in Wallachia and Moldavia after the fall of Constantinople". In Stanković, Vlada (ed.). The Balkans and the Byzantine World before and after the Captures of Constantinople, 1204 and 1453. Lexington Books. pp. 117–164. ISBN 978-1-49851-325-8.
