= Evdochia of Kiev =

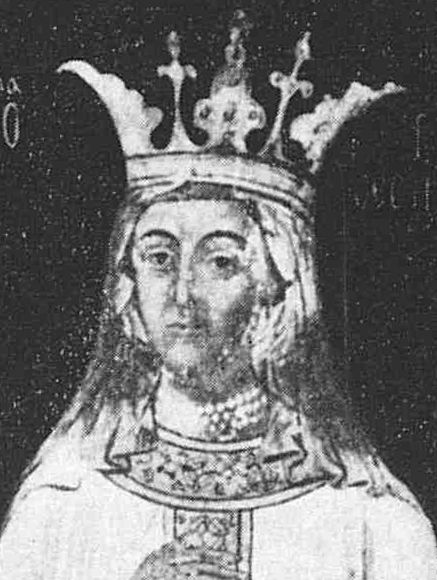

Princess consort of Moldavia
- Tenure: 1463 – 25 November 1467
- Born: Princess Evdochia of Kiev; Unknown
- Died: 25 November 1467
- Burial: Suceava, Moldavia
- Spouse: Stephen III of Moldavia (m. 1463)
- Issue: Prince Alexandru (?); Elena, Crown Princess of Moscow
Names
- Ukrainian: Євдокія Олельківна; Russian: Евдокия Олельковна; English: Evdochia Olelkovna
- House: House of Olelkovich
- Father: Aleksandras Olelka, Prince of Kiev
- Mother: Princess Anastasia of Moscow

Princess Evdochia of Kiev (Ukrainian: Євдокія Олельківна; also known as Evdokia; ? – 25 November 1467) was a Princess of Kiev by birth, and became Princess consort of Moldavia after her marriage to Prince Stephen III of Moldavia. She was the mother of Elena, Crown Princess of Moscow.

== Early life ==
Evdochia was born into the large House of Gediminid, as the second daughter and fourth child of Alexander Olelkovich, Prince of Kiev (d. 1454) and his wife, Anastasia of Moscow (1470), daughter of Vasily I of Moscow and Sophia of Lithuania. She was the sister of Simeon of Kiev, and a cousin of Ivan III, Grand Prince of Moscow. She married Stephen III of Moldavia in 1463.

== Biography ==
Evdochia was most probably the mother of Stephen's two sons, Bogdan and Peter, according to historian Jonathan Eagles. Bogdan died in 1479, Peter in 1480. Both sons were buried in the Putna Monastery, established by their father. When Stephen made a donation to the Hilandar Monastery on Mount Athos on 27 July 1466, he specified that the monks should pray for his relatives, including Evdochia and their two children, Alexandru and Olena. Alexandru was most probably identical with Stephen's first-born son and co-ruler who died in 1496, according to Eagles.

She died in the winter of 1467. She was buried in the Mirăuți Church (which was the see of the Metropolitan of Moldavia) in Suceava. Her husband granted 100 beehives, a vineyard and a pond to the church on 15 February 1469. Her tombstone was rediscovered in 1996.

== Sources ==
- Eagles, Jonathan (2014). Stephen the Great and Balkan Nationalism: Moldova and Eastern European History. I.B. Tauris. ISBN 978-1-78076-353-8.
- Păun, Radu G. (2016). "Mount Athos and the Byzantine-Slavic Tradition in Wallachia and Moldavia after the fall of Constantinople". In Stanković, Vlada (ed.). The Balkans and the Byzantine World before and after the Captures of Constantinople, 1204 and 1453. Lexington Books. pp. 117–164. ISBN 978-1-49851-325-8.
- Pop, Ioan-Aurel (2005). "The Romanians in the 14th–16th centuries from the "Christian Republic" to the "Restoration of Dacia"". In Pop, Ioan-Aurel; Bolovan, Ioan (eds.). History of Romania: Compendium. Romanian Cultural Institute (Center for Transylvanian Studies). pp. 209–314. ISBN 978-973-7784-12-4.
