= Sophia Palaiologina =

Grand Princess of Moscow from 1472 to 1503

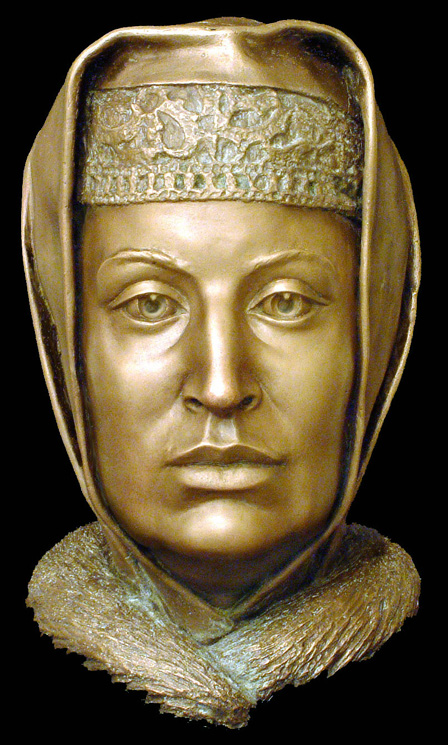
- Reconstruction by Sergey Nikitin, 1994

Grand Princess consort of Moscow
- Tenure: 12 November 1472 – 7 April 1503
- Predecessor: Maria of Tver
- Successor: Solomonia Saburova
- Born: c. 1449
- Died: 7 April 1503
- Burial: Ascension Convent, Kolomenskoye; Archangel Cathedral, Kremlin (1929)
- Spouse: Ivan III of Russia
- Issue: Vasili III; Yury Ivanovich; Dmitri Ivanovich; Simeon Ivanovich; Andrey Ivanovich; Elena Ivanovna; Feodosiya Ivanovna; Eudoxia Ivanovna
- House: Palaiologos
- Father: Thomas Palaiologos
- Mother: Catherine Zaccaria
- Religion: Roman Catholic and Eastern Orthodox

Sophia Fominichna Palaiologina or Paleologue (Russian: София Фоминична Палеолог, romanized: Sofiya Fominichna Paleolog; born Zoe Palaiologina; Medieval Greek: Ζωή Παλαιολογίνα; c. 1449 – 7 April 1503) was a Byzantine princess from the Palaiologos imperial dynasty and the grand princess of Moscow as the second wife of Ivan III of Russia. Her father was Thomas Palaiologos, the despot of the Morea. Through her eldest son, Vasili III, she was the grandmother of Ivan IV, the first crowned tsar of all Russia.

== Family ==
Zoe was born in the Morea in 1449. Her father was Thomas Palaiologos, Despot of the Morea and younger brother of the last Byzantine Emperor, Constantine XI Palaiologos (r. 1449–1453). Her mother was Catherine, daughter and heiress of Centurione II Zaccaria, the last independent Prince of Achaea and Baron of Arcadia.

The marriage between Thomas Palaiologos and Catherine Zaccaria produced four children: Helena (later wife of Lazar Branković, Despot of Serbia), Zoe, Andreas, and Manuel.

== In Italy ==
The fall of the Byzantine Empire in 1453 was a turning point in Zoe's life. Seven years later, in 1460, the Ottoman army attacked Morea and quickly breached the Hexamilion wall across the Isthmus of Corinth, which was too long to be effectively manned and defended by Thomas' forces. Thomas and his family escaped to Corfu and then to Rome, where (already recognized as the legitimate heir to the Byzantine Empire by the Pope) he made a ceremonial entrance as Byzantine Emperor on 7 March 1461. Catherine remained in Corfu with her children and died there on 16 August 1462.

Zoe and her brothers remained in Petriti, a fishing port on the southeast coast of Corfu, until 1465, when their dying father recalled them to Rome. Thomas Palaiologos died on 12 May 1465.

Zoe and her brothers were adopted by the Papacy after her father's death. Born and raised in the Orthodox religion, it is possible that she was educated as a Catholic in Rome. She spent the next years in the court of Pope Sixtus IV.

The care of the Imperial children was assigned to a famous Greek humanist, theologian and scholar, Cardinal Basilios Bessarion. The Cardinal's surviving correspondence shows that the Pope took an interest in the welfare and development of Sophia and her brothers. They received 3,600 crowns (in payments of 200 crowns per month) for their clothes, horses and servants, and an additional 100 crowns for the maintenance of a modest household that included a doctor, a Latin teacher, a Greek teacher, a translator, and one or two priests.

After the death of Thomas Palaeologus, his eldest son, Andreas, claimed the Imperial title, but he sold his rights to several European monarchs and ultimately died in poverty. During the reign of Bayezid II, Manuel returned to Constantinople and remained there, at the mercy of the Sultan. According to some sources, he converted to Islam, raised a family and served in the Turkish Navy.

In 1466, the Venetian Republic invited King James II of Cyprus to ask for the hand of Sophia in marriage, but he refused. Around 1467, Pope Paul II offered Sophia's hand to a Prince Caracciolo. Although they were solemnly betrothed, the marriage never took place.

== Grand Princess consort of Moscow ==
Maria of Tver, the first wife of Grand Prince Ivan III of Moscow, died in 1467. Their marriage produced one son, Ivan the Young, born in 1458.

The marriage between Sophia and Ivan III was proposed by Pope Paul II in 1469, probably in hopes of strengthening the influence of the Catholic Church in Russia and eventually unifying the Orthodox and Catholic churches, as stipulated in the Council of Florence. Ivan III's motives for pursuing this union were probably related to Sophia's status and her rights over Constantinople. Cardinal Bessarion, a dedicated advocate of reunification, may have conceived the marriage plan.

Negotiations lasted for three years. Russian chronicles describe the events as follows:

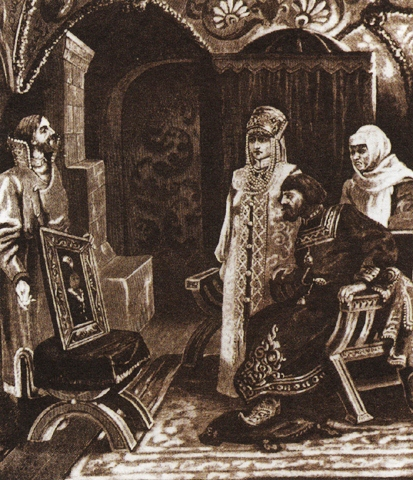
Ivan Fryazin showed to Ivan III the portrait of Sophia Palaiologina, by Viktor Muizhel.

- On 11 February 1469, a delegation led by Cardinal Bessarion arrived in Moscow with the formal proposal of a marriage between Sophia and the Grand Prince. Ivan III consulted his mother, Maria of Borovsk, the Metropolitan Philip and his boyars, and received a positive response.
- In 1469, Ivan Fryazin (Gian-Battista della Volpe) was sent to the Papal Court to engage in formal negotiations for the match. The Pope received the Russian Ambassador with great honors. According to the chronicles, Fryazin returned to Moscow with a portrait of the princess that "caused an extreme surprise in the court". (This portrait has not survived. It was probably painted by one of the painters in residence at the Papal Court at that time, either Pietro Perugino, Melozzo da Forlì or Pedro Berruguete).
- On 16 January 1472, Fryazin was sent to Rome again, this time to bring home his master's bride. He arrived in Rome on 23 May, after a journey of more than four months.
- The marriage took place on 1 June 1472, at St. Peter's Basilica. Because Grand Prince Ivan III could not be present, Fryazin served as his proxy. Clarice Orsini (wife of Lorenzo the Magnificent, ruler of Florence) and Queen Catherine of Bosnia were among the guests at the ceremony. Sophia received 6,000 ducats as a dowry.
- On 24 June 1472, Sophia and Fryazin left Rome with a grand entourage. The bride was accompanied by Cardinal Bessarion, who was probably there to act as an agent at the Moscow court. Legend says that Sophia's dowry included books that became the basis of the famous library of Ivan the Terrible, her grandson. Their itinerary took them to the north of Italy and through Germany to the port of Lübeck, where they arrived on 1 September. The voyage across the Baltic Sea took 11 days. The ship landed in Reval (now Tallinn) in October 1472, and she continued the trip through Dorpat (now Tartu), Pskov, and Novgorod. Sophia was officially acclaimed in Pskov, and she impressed onlookers by the way she thanked the public for the celebrations. Sophia finally arrived in Moscow on 12 November 1472.

Even before she departed for Russian lands, it became apparent that the Vatican's plans to have Sophia represent Catholicism had failed: Immediately after her wedding, she returned to the faith of her fathers. Papal Legate Anthony was not permitted to enter Moscow carrying the Latin cross before him. The Korsun cross is on view in the collections of the Moscow Kremlin Museums.

The formal wedding between Ivan III and Sophia took place at the Dormition Cathedral in Moscow on 12 November 1472. Some sources say that the ceremony was performed by Metropolitan Philip, others state that Hosea, Abbot of Kolomna, was the officiant.

Special mansions and gardens were built for Sophia in Moscow. They were burned in the great Moscow fire of 1493, and much of the treasure of the Grand Princess was lost.

Sophia was apparently not obliged to follow the custom of isolation that was practiced by elite Russian women among the wealthy boyars and the royal family. It was noted that she did not confine herself to the terems, the women's quarters, but greeted foreign representatives as the queens of Western Europe did.

The Venetian ambassador, Ambrogio Contarini, wrote that in 1476 he had an audience with the Grand Duchess, who received him politely and kindly, and respectfully asked about the Doge.

Before the invasion of Akhmad in 1480, Sophia, her children, household and treasury were sent away, first to Dmitrov and then on to Belozersk. For fear Akhmad would finally take Moscow, she was advised to flee farther north, to the sea. These precautions led Vissarion, Bishop of Rostov, to warn the Grand Duke that his excessive attachment to his wife and children would be his destruction. The family did not return to Moscow until the winter.

=== Dynastic problems and rivalry ===
Over time, the second marriage of the Grand Prince became one of the main sources of tension in the court, thanks to the "shrewd" character of the new Grand Princess and the spreading rumours that her husband let himself be directed by her suggestions. It is believed that Sophia introduced grand Byzantine ceremonies and meticulous court etiquette into the Kremlin, pleased with the idea of Moscow as a Third Rome.

In 1472, she was repelled by the formal tributary gesture with which her spouse greeted the Mongolian representatives. She is supposed to have convinced him to abandon that subordinate relationship with the Mongols in a break that was eventually completed in 1480.

Soon, the court divided into two parties. One supported the heir to the throne, Ivan the Young, and the other sided with Sophia. In 1476, the Venetian Ambrogio Contarini noted that the heir to the throne had lost his father's favor, thanks to the intrigues of the Despoina. Despoina, or “Lady”, was used as a Byzantine court title. Sophia was so honoured as her father's heir. However, if any tension existed between father and son, it did not interfere with his rights: From 1477 Ivan the Young was officially referred to as the co-ruler of Ivan III.

The princely family increased significantly: between 1474 and 1490, as the Grand Princess gave birth to eleven children, five sons and six daughters.

There is a legend associated with the birth of Sophia's eldest son, the future Vasily III: During one of her devout visits to the Trinity Lavra of St. Sergius, the Grand Princess had a vision of the Venerable Sergius of Radonezh in which the saint "presented her the long-waited son between his arms."

Another source of tension appeared in the Russian court in January 1483, when Ivan the Young married Elena, daughter of Stephen III the Great, Prince of Moldavia. The heir's new wife soon became involved in court intrigues, especially after 10 October 1483, when she gave birth to a son, Dmitry. After the annexation of Tver in 1485, the Grand Duke named Ivan the Young Grand Prince of this domain. During the 1480s, Ivan's position as the rightful heir was quite secure and Sophia's supporters became less so. In particular, the Grand Princess was unable to obtain government posts for her relatives: Her brother, Andreas, departed from Moscow with nothing, and her niece, Maria (wife of Vasily Mikhailovich, Hereditary Prince of Verey-Belozersky), was forced to flee to Lithuania with her husband, an event that further undermined Sophia's position at court. According to sources, Sophia had arranged her niece's marriage to Prince Vasily in 1480, and in 1483 she gave Maria some jewelry that belonged to Ivan III's first wife. When Ivan the Young asked for these jewels (he wanted to give them to his wife, Elena, as a gift), he discovered they were missing. Outraged, he ordered a search. Prince Vasily did not wait for retribution, but fled to Lithuania with his wife. One direct consequence of this episode was that Prince Michael of Verey-Belozersky, Vasily's father, bequeathed his domains to the Grand Prince, effectively disinheriting his son. Sophia was able to obtain a pardon for her niece and her husband in 1493, but they never returned.

New factors came into play around 1490 when Ivan the Young became ill. The diagnosis was gout. Sophia wrote to a Venetian doctor named Leon, who imprudently promised Ivan III that he could cure the heir to the throne. All efforts failed. Ivan the Young died on 7 March 1490, and the doctor was executed. Rumors spread through Moscow that Sophia had poisoned the heir. Andrey Kurbsky, who wrote about these events almost 100 years later, said that these rumors were indisputable facts. However, modern historians say that, due to lack of sources, the theory that Sophia poisoned Ivan the Young cannot be verified.

In 1497, Sophia and her eldest son, Vasili, were allegedly involved in a plot to kill Prince Dmitry, son of Ivan the Young. Both were disgraced and probably banished from court. On 4 February 1498, in the Dormition Cathedral in an atmosphere of great splendor, Prince Dmitry was crowned Grand Prince and co-ruler with his grandfather. Sophia and her son Vasili were not invited to the coronation. However, they were restored to favor in mid-1499 and allowed to return to court.

On 11 April 1502, the dynastic struggle came to an end. According to chronicles, Ivan III suddenly changed his mind and imprisoned both Grand Prince Dmitry and his mother, Elena, placing them under house arrest, surrounded by guards. Three days later, on 14 April, Vasili was crowned the new Grand Prince and co-ruler. Soon, Dmitry and his mother were transferred from house arrest to prison.

The downfall of Dmitry and Elena also determined the fate of the Moscow-Novgorod Reformation movement in the Orthodox Church. In 1503, a council finally defeated it, and many prominent and progressive leaders of the movement were executed. Elena of Moldavia died in prison on 18 January 1505. Her son Dmitry died a few years later, on 14 February 1509, either from hunger and cold, or, as some claim, by suffocation on the orders of his uncle.

== Death ==
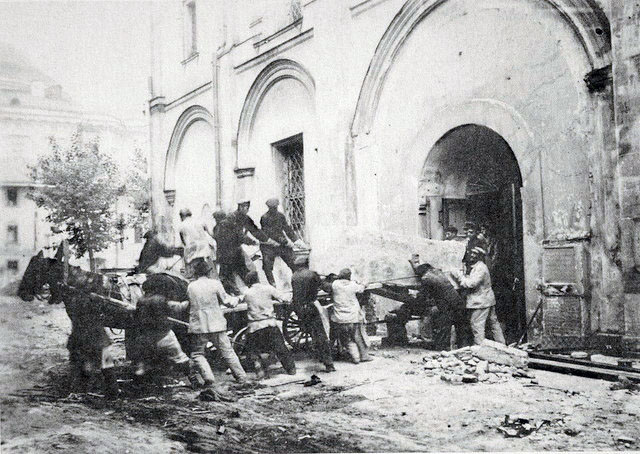
Destruction of Sophia Palaiologina grave in 1929.

The triumph of her son was the last important event in Sophia's life. She died on 7 April 1503, two years before her husband, who died on 27 October 1505.

She was buried in a massive white stone sarcophagus in the crypt of the Ascension Convent in the Kremlin, next to the grave of Maria of Tver, the first wife of Ivan III. The word "Sophia" is carved on the lid of the sarcophagus.

The Ascension Convent was demolished in 1929 as ordered by the Soviet government, and the remains of Sophia and of other royal women were transferred to an underground chamber in the southern extension of the Cathedral of the Archangel.

== Issue ==
- Elena (18 April 1474 – 9 May 1476, died as a child).
- Feodosia (May 1475 – died young).
- Elena (19 May 1476 – 20 January 1513), married Alexander Jagiellon, King of Poland and Grand Duke of Lithuania.
- Vasili (26 March 1479 – 3 December 1533), became Grand Prince of Moscow.
- Yuri (23 March 1480 – 3 August 1536), Prince of Dmitrov, died of starvation in prison.
- Dmitri (6 October 1481 – 14 February 1521), Prince of Uglich.
- Eudokia (February 1483 – 8 February 1513), married Khudakul, Kazan Tsar of the Tartars (baptized as Peter).
- Elena (8 April 1484 – died young).
- Feodosia (29 May 1485 – 19 February 1501), married Vasili, Prince of Kholm.
- Simeon (21 March 1487 – 26 June 1518), Prince of Kaluga, fled to Lithuania after being accused of treason.
- Andrei (5 August 1490 – 11 December 1537), Prince of Staritza, killed in prison.

== In popular culture ==
Sophia Palaiologina was the subject of the 2016 Russian television series Sophia, in which she was portrayed by Mariya Andreyeva.

She is a minor character in Dorothy Dunnett's acclaimed series of historical novels, known as The House of Niccolò, which is set in the late 15th century.

Sophia Palaiologina Palaiologos dynasty Born: c. 1440/49 Died: 7 April 1503
Russian royalty
Vacant Title last held by Maria of Tver	Grand Princess of Moscow; 1472–1503	Vacant Title next held by Solomonia Saburova
