= Ivanović =

Ivanović (Serbian Cyrillic: Ивановић, pronounced [ǐʋanoʋitɕ]), also transliterated as Ivanovich) is a South Slavic surname, a patronymic derived from Ivan. It is a Slavic equivalent of Johnson. It is a common surname in Bosnia and Herzegovina, Croatia, Montenegro, and Serbia. It may refer to the following notable people:

- Ana Ivanovic (born 1987), Serbian tennis player
- Božidar Ivanović (born 1946), Montenegrin chess grandmaster and politician
- Božina Ivanović (1931–2002), Montenegrin anthropologist and politician
- Branislav Ivanović (born 1984), Serbian footballer
- Cristoforo Ivanovich (1620–1689), Venetian music historian, poet, librettist
- Đorđe Ivanović (born 1995), Serbian footballer
- Duško Ivanović, (born 1957), Montenegrin basketball player and coach
- Franjo Ivanović (born 2003), Croatian footballer
- Ivan Rikard Ivanović (born Ivan Kraus; 1880–1949), Croatian politician
- Josef Ivanović (born 1973), former German football player and coach
- Marin Ivanović (born 1981), Croatian rapper better known by his stage name Stoka
- Mihailo Ivanović (disambiguation), several people
- Milan Ivanović (born 1960), Serbian-born Australian footballer
- Nemanja Ivanović (born 1997), Serbian footballer
- Oliver Ivanović (1953–2018), Kosovo Serb politician
- Saša Ivanović (born 1984), Montenegrin footballer
- Tina Ivanović, (born 1974), Serbian singer and model
- Vane Ivanović (1913–1999), Yugoslav diplomat, athlete and philanthropist
- Velimir Ivanović (born 1978), Serbian footballer

== See also ==
- Ivanovich (patronymic)
- Ivanovitch
