= Yury Ivanovich =

Russian heir apparent (1480–1536)

- Born: 23 March 1480
- Died: 3 August 1536 (aged 56)
- House: Rurik
- Father: Ivan III of Russia
- Mother: Sophia Palaiologina

Yury Ivanovich (Russian: Юрий Ива́нович; 23 March 1480 – 3 August 1536) was the second surviving son of Ivan III and his wife Sophia Paleologue. Since 1519, his appanages included Dmitrovskoe knjazevstvo.

When his elder brother Vasily III ascended to the throne, Yury was 24 years old. Like his other brothers, he was forbidden to marry until Vasily could produce an heir and even then he was not allowed to marry without the ruler's permission. For Yury Ivanovich this permission never came because after his brother's death in 1533 his widow and regent for the young Ivan IV, Elena Glinskaya, began to suspect Yury.

Not long after that Yury was arrested and put in prison where he died of starvation in 1536.
