= Dmitry Ivanovich (grandson of Ivan III) =

Grand Prince of Moscow from 1498 to 1502

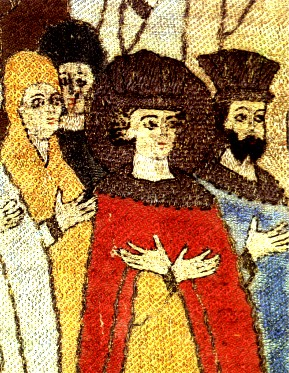
- Dmitry on a shroud belonging to Elena Voloshanka, c. 1498

Grand Prince of Moscow (co-ruler)
- Reign: 4 February 1498 – 11 April 1502
- Predecessor: Ivan Ivanovich
- Successor: Vasili III
- Monarch: Ivan III
- Born: 10 October 1483; Moscow, Russia
- Died: 14 February 1509; Moscow, Russia
- House: Rurik
- Father: Ivan the Young
- Mother: Elena of Moldavia

Dmitry Ivanovich (Russian: Дмитрий Иванович; 10 October 1483 – 14 February 1509), also known as Dmitry the Grandson (Russian: Дмитрий Иванович Внук), was Grand Prince of Moscow from 1498 to 1502. He was the only surviving son of Ivan Ivanovich, the eldest son of Ivan III of Russia.

Following the death of his father in 1490, Dmitry became heir presumptive and was later crowned in 1498 as grand prince by his grandfather. Eventually, he lost the title to his uncle Vasili and was imprisoned along with his mother Elena.

== Life ==
Dmitry's parents were Ivan the Young, the eldest son of Ivan III of Russia and heir apparent, and Elena of Moldavia, a daughter of Stephen III of Moldavia. After his father's death in 1490, he became heir presumptive.

On 4 February 1498, Ivan III had his grandson, Dmitry, crowned as grand prince of Vladimir, Moscow and all Russia.

Even after receiving the title, Dmitry did not play any political role. On the other hand, his uncle Vasili received, from Ivan III, control of Novgorod and Pskov in 1499.

During the next three years, the Muscovite court became a place of conspiracy between supporters of Dmitry, represented by his mother Elena, and supporters of Ivan's second-born son Vasili, represented by his mother and Ivan III's second wife, Sophia Paleologue.

On 11 April 1502, Ivan III sent Dmitry and his mother Elena to prison. Three days later, Ivan gave Vasili the title of grand prince and autocrat of all Russia. In 1509, Dmitry died in prison.

== Ancestry ==
Ancestors of Dmitry Ivanovich (grandson of Ivan III)

8. Vasily II of Moscow
4. Ivan III of Russia
9. Maria of Borovsk
2. Ivan the Young
10. Boris of Tver
5. Maria of Tver
11. Anastasia Andreevena of Mozhavsk
1. Dmitry Ivanovich
12. Bogdan II of Moldavia
6. Stephen the Great
13. Maria Oltea
3. Elena of Moldavia
14. Aleksandras Olelka
7. Evdochia of Kiev
15. Princess Anastasia of Moscow

== See also ==
- Family tree of Russian monarchs

== Sources ==
- Bogatyrev, Sergei (2007). "Reinventing the Russian Monarchy in the 1550s: Ivan the Terrible, the Dynasty, and the Church". The Slavonic and East European Review. 85 (2 Apr). Modern Humanities Research Association and University College London, School of Slavonic and East European Studies. doi:10.1353/see.2007.0067.
- Fennell, J. L. I. (1960). "The Dynastic Crisis 1497-1502". The Slavonic and East European Review. 39 (92 Dec). Modern Humanities Research Association and University College London, School of Slavonic and East European Studies.
