= Andrey Bolshoy =

Andrey Vasilyevich Bolshoy
- Андрей Васильевич Большой
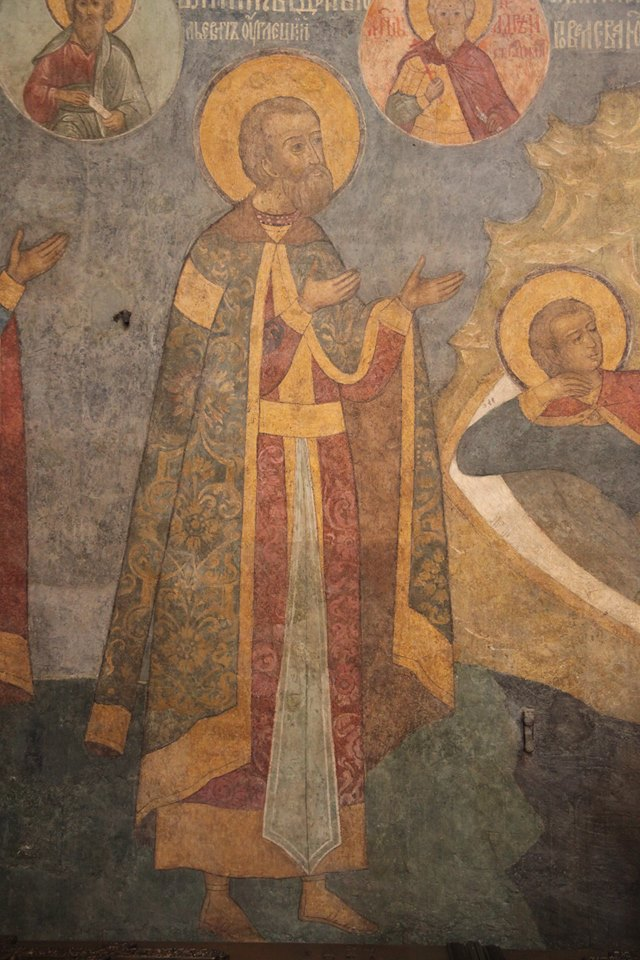
- Born: 14 August 1446; Uglich
- Died: 6 November 1493 (aged 47); Moscow
- Other names: Goryay (Горяй); Andrey Bolshoy (Big Andrew)
- Known for: Transforming Uglich into a major center of political power
- Parent: Vasily II of Moscow
- Relatives: Ivan III of Moscow (brother)

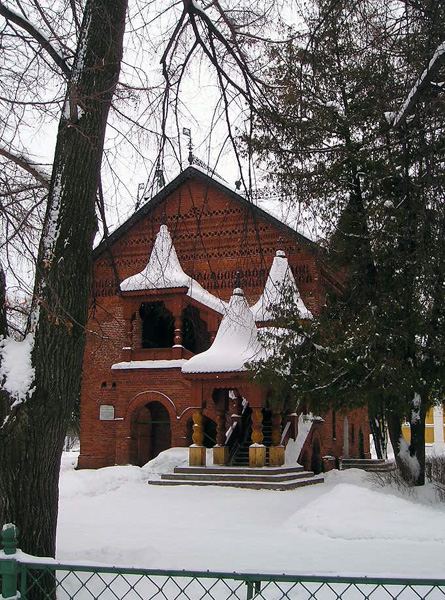
Andrey was responsible for construction of the first stone edifices of Uglich – the cathedral, the Intercession cloister, and his own palace. Of these structures, only a section of the latter survives.

Andrey Vasilyevich Bolshoy (Russian: Андрей Васильевич Большой; 14 August 1446 – 6 November 1493), nicknamed Goryay (Горяй), was the third son of Vasily II of Moscow. He transformed his capital in Uglich into a major centre of political power and ensured the town's prosperity for two centuries to come. He was called Andrey Bolshoy (Big Andrew) to distinguish him from his younger brother Andrey Menshoy (Little Andrew).

== Life ==
Andrey Bolshoy was born in Uglich. After the death of his father in 1462, Andrey Bolshoy inherited the cities of Uglich, Zvenigorod, and Bezhetsk. His relations with his older brother, Ivan III of Moscow, were cordial at first. It was ten years later that the death of their brother, the childless Yury of Dmitrov, led to bad blood between the two. Ivan III appropriated Yury's appanage for himself, rather than sharing it with his brothers. At last he granted some of Yury's lands to his other brothers, except Andrei Bolshoy, who had been coveting them more than others.

Another conflict between the two brothers was triggered by the right of boyars to leave their own prince for the courts of other princes. Ivan III would only allow such practice if a boyar were to move to Moscow. In 1479, one displeased boyar, Prince Lyko-Obolensky, left the Moscow Kremlin and settled at the court of his brother Boris, ruler of Volokolamsk. When the latter refused to extradite the boyar, Ivan III ordered to capture Lyko-Obolensky and deliver him to Moscow in chains. Andrei Bolshoy took the side of the offended prince of Volokolamsk. The two brothers joined their armies and marched towards Novgorod and then to the Lithuanian border. There, they began to negotiate with the Polish king Kazimierz IV, who decided not to interfere in the conflict. Boris and Andrey then sought support in Pskov, but to no avail.

In order to settle the conflict, Ivan III offered Andrei Bolshoy the cities of Kaluga and Aleksin, but he refused. The invasion of Khan Akhmat in 1480 reconciled the grand prince with his brothers. Ivan III became more tractable and promised to fulfill all their demands. Andrei and Boris moved their armies to the Ugra River and joined Ivan III in his stand-off with the Mongols. Their reconciliation was mediated by their mother, metropolitan and a number of bishops. As a token of their reconciliation, the grand prince granted Andrei the city of Mozhaisk, the most coveted part of Yury's appanage.

After the death of their mother Maria of Borovsk in 1484, Andrei's situation became perilous because his defiant stance and groundless claims filled Ivan III with misgivings. He was afraid that, in line with the ancient system of Rurikid succession, Andrey would attempt to usurp the throne of Muscovy after his own death. In 1488, Andrey was informed about Ivan's plans to dethrone and imprison him. Upon his epistolary complaint to the grand prince, the latter protested his innocence. In 1491, Ivan III ordered Andrei and Boris to send their armies to help out his ally Meñli I Giray. For reasons unknown, Andrei disobeyed the grand prince. When he came to Moscow in 1492, he was arrested and put in prison in Moscow, where he died in 1493. Thereupon Andrey's sons – Ivan and Dmitry – were imprisoned in Vologda, while their appanage – Uglich – was annexed into Muscovy.

== Sources ==
- "Андрей Васильевич Большой" . Brockhaus and Efron Encyclopedic Dictionary (in Russian). 1906.
