= Ivanovici =

Ivanovici is a Romanian-language surname.

- Alex Ivanovici, Canadian actor and theatre director
- Ion Ivanovici, Romanian military band conductor and composer
- Horia Ivanovici, Romanian journalist and TV show producer
- Petre Ivanovici, Romanian professional footballer
