= Verkh =

Verkh Верх
- Village
- Location within Vologda Oblast Location within Russia
- Coordinates: 58°56′N 37°21′E
- Country: Russia
- Region: Vologda Oblast
- District: Cherepovetsky District
- Time zone: UTC+3:00

Verkh (Russian: Верх) is a rural locality (a village) in Korotovskoye Rural Settlement, Cherepovetsky District, Vologda Oblast, Russia. The population was 47 as of 2002. There are 4 streets.

== Geography ==
Verkh is located 65 km southwest of Cherepovets (the district's administrative centre) by road. Korotkovo is the nearest rural locality.
