= Elena of Moldavia =

- Grand Princess of Moscow
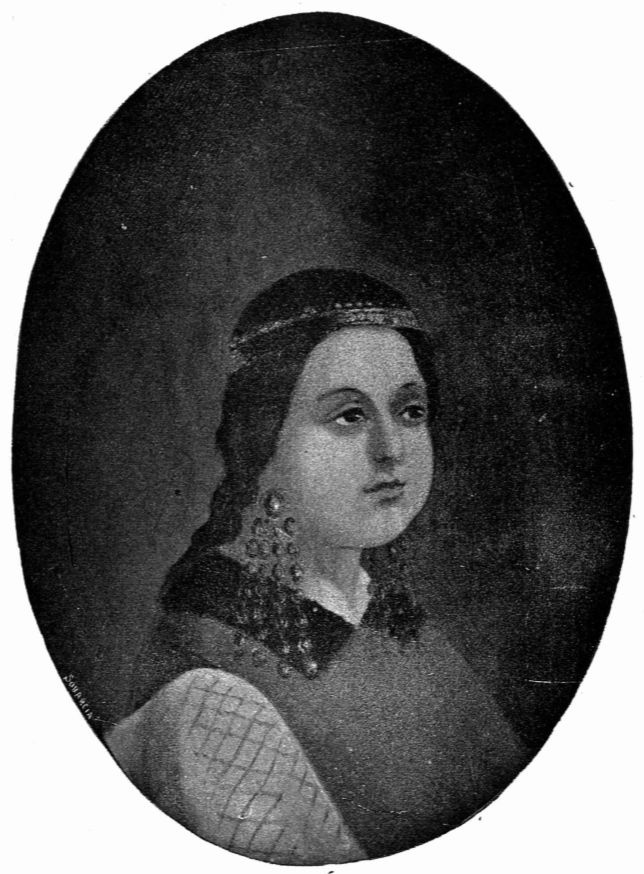
- Fantasy portrait from the album of the Bucharest National Museum of Antiquities (1904)

Princess of Tver
- Reign: 1485–1490
- Monarch: Ivan III
- Born: c. 1464–1466
- Died: 18 January 1505 (aged 39 or 41); Moscow, Russia
- Burial: Ascension Convent, Moscow
- Spouse: Ivan Ivanovich of Russia (m. 1483; died 1490)
- Issue: Dmitry Ivanovich
Names
- Russian: Елена Стефановна Волошанка; English: Elena Voloshanka Stefanovna
- House: Mușat
- Father: Stephen III of Moldavia
- Mother: Princess Evdochia of Kiev

Elena Stefanovna of Moldavia (Russian: Елена Стефановна, romanized: Yelena Stefanovna), also known as Elena of Wallachia (Russian: Елена Волошанка, romanized: Yelena Voloshanka; c. 1464–1466 – 18 January 1505), was a Moldavian princess as a daughter of Stephen III, who later became the grand princess consort of Moscow in 1483 as the wife of Ivan the Young, the heir of Ivan III of Russia.

After her husband's death in 1490, their son Dmitry Ivanovich was made co-ruler in 1498 until her faction lost in 1502; she and her son were then imprisoned.

== Biography ==
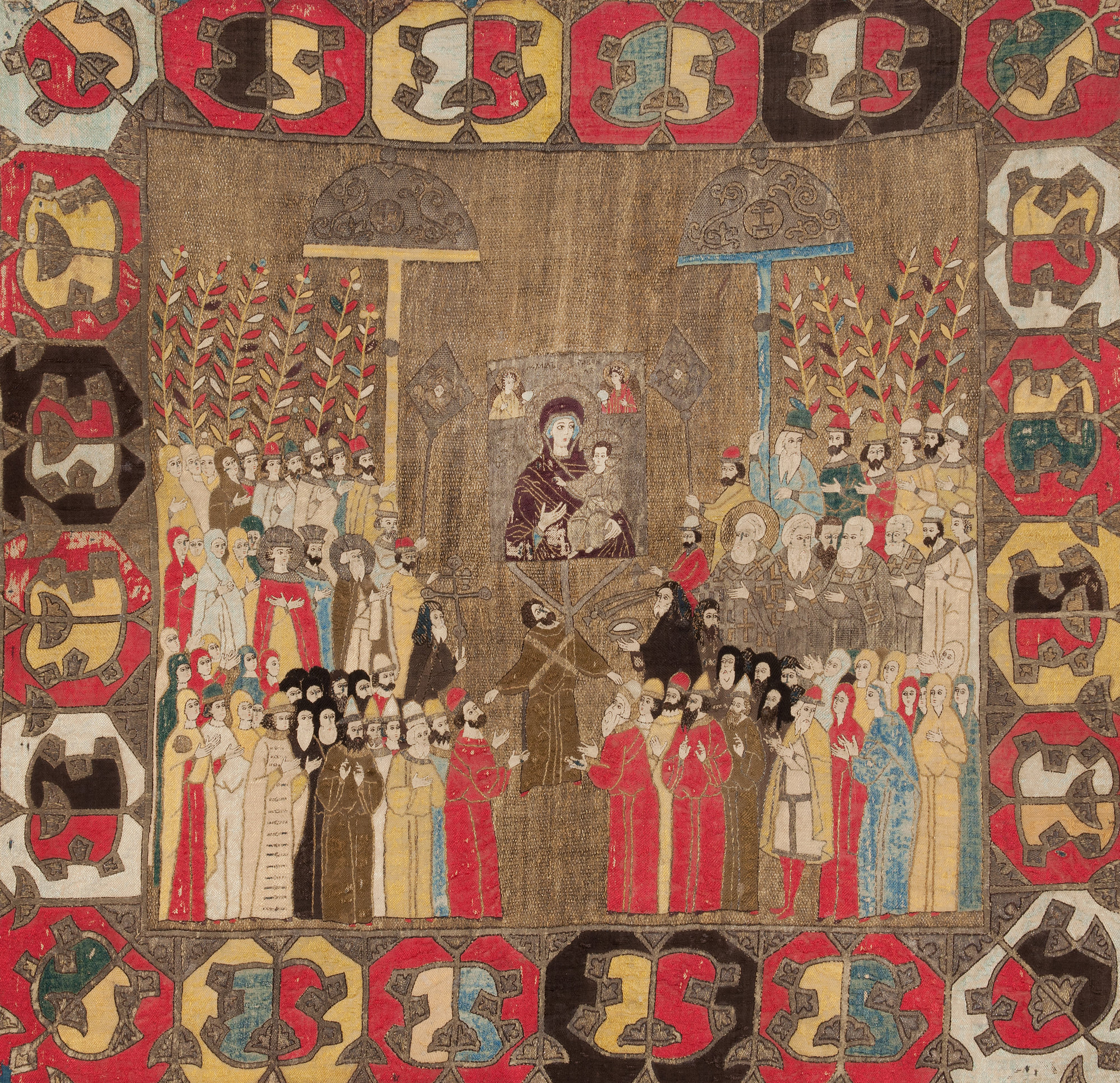
Depiction of Palm Sunday procession with Ivan III and his family on a shroud belonging to Elena, c. 1498.

Elena was born in c. 1464–1466. Her parents were Stephen III ("the Great"), the sovereign prince of Moldavia, and his first (or second) wife Princess Evdochia of Kiev.

Negotiations to marry her to Ivan Ivanovich ("the Young"), heir to the throne of Moscow, began in the late 1470s. Elena married Ivan the Young on 12 January 1483, and gave birth to Dmitry Ivanovich on 10 October 1483. After the death of her spouse in 1490, her son, who had borne only the title prince, was appointed as the heir to the Russian throne and made co-ruler in 1498. She actively participated in politics at court to protect her son's interests and rights to succession against Sophia Palaiologina, the stepmother of her late spouse, who wished for her son to be appointed heir. The Judaizers, a religious sect in Russia, also found a patron in Elena.

In 1502, the faction of Sophia defeated the faction of Elena. She was transferred to a prison in Moscow with her son, where she was apparently murdered on 18 January 1505.

== Sources ==
- "Елена Степановна" . Brockhaus and Efron Encyclopedic Dictionary (in Russian). 1906.
- Мохов Н. А. Молдавия эпохи феодализма. — Кишинёв: Картя Молдовеняскэ, 1964. — С. 196–197.
