= Vasily Ivanovich =

Vasily Ivanovich is an East Slavic personal name, a combination of a given name and a patronymic. Notable people commonly referred to as "Vasily Ivanovich" include:

- Vasily Ivanovich Chapayev, a Russian Civil War hero and a butt of numerous Russian jokes
- Vasily Ivanovich of Ryazan, Grand Prince of Ryazan
- Vasili III Ivanovich, Grand Prince of Moscow
- Vasili IV of Russia (Vasily Ivánovich Shúyskiy)

== See also ==
- Vasily Ivanov
- Vasily (disambiguation)
