= Saša Ivanović =

Montenegrin footballer

Personal information
- Full name: Saša Ivanović
- Date of birth: 26 June 1984 (age 42)
- Place of birth: SFR Yugoslavia
- Height: 1.94 m (6 ft 4 in)
- Position: Goalkeeper

Youth career
- Teteks

Senior career*
Years	Team	Apps	(Gls)
–2008	Zeta	67	(0)
2003	→ Bratstvo Cijevna (loan)		
2008–2009	ŁKS Łódź	0	(0)
2009–2013	Zeta	117	(0)
2014	Dečić	3	(0)
2014–2016	Mornar	32	(0)
2016–2017	Kom		
2017–2020	OFK Titograd	25	(0)
- * Club domestic league appearances and goals

Saša Ivanović (born 26 June 1984) is a Montenegrin retired footballer who played as a goalkeeper.

== Club career ==
He had a spell in Poland, playing for ŁKS Łódź in the 2008–09 Ekstraklasa Cup.

== Honours ==
Zeta

- Montenegrin First League: 2006–07

OFK Titograd

- Montenegrin Cup: 2017–18
