= Mihailo Ivanović =

Mihailo Ivanović may refer to:

- Mihailo Ivanović (politician) (1874–1949), Montenegrin politician
- Mihailo Ivanović (football manager) (born 1952), Serbian football manager
- Mihailo Ivanović (footballer) (born 2004), Serbian football forward
