= Ivan the Young =

Medieval Russian royal

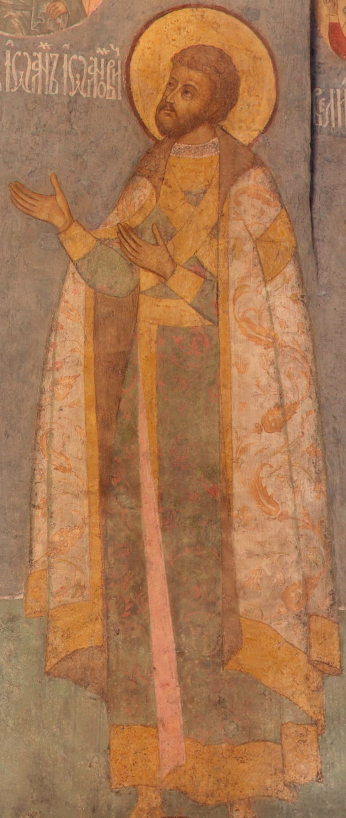

Grand Prince of Moscow (co-ruler)
- Reign: 1471–1490
- Predecessor: Ivan III
- Successor: Dmitry Ivanovich
- Co-monarch: Ivan III

Prince of Tver
- Reign: 1485–1490
- Predecessor: Mikhail III
- Monarch: Ivan III
- Born: 15 February 1458
- Died: 6 March 1490 (aged 32)
- Spouse: Elena of Moldavia
- Issue: Dmitry Ivanovich
- House: Rurik
- Father: Ivan III of Russia
- Mother: Maria of Tver
- Religion: Russian Orthodox

Ivan Ivanovich (Russian: Иван Иванович) or Ioann Ioannovich (Иоанн Иоаннович), also known as Ivan the Young (Russian: Иван Молодой, romanized: Ivan Molodoy; 15 February 1458 – 6 March 1490), was the eldest son and heir of Ivan III of Russia from his first marriage to Maria of Tver. In 1471, he was given the title of grand prince by his father and made co-ruler. In 1485, he was given Tver as an appanage.

== Biography ==
Ivan Ivanovich was born on 15 February 1458, the son of Ivan III by his first wife Maria of Tver, who later died in 1467.

In 1471, as Ivan III marched off on his campaign against Novgorod, he bestowed upon the young Ivan the title of grand prince, so the Muscovite ambassadors and government officials used to speak on behalf of the two grand princes. Ambassadors from different Russian cities (e.g. Novgorod), as well ambassadors from foreign countries, could equally address both Ivan III and Ivan the Young with the same requests or problems.

Russian chronicles continued to give the young Ivan the title of grand prince after his father returned following his victory over Novgorod in July 1471 all the way up to his death. In treaties between Ivan III and appanage princes, the young Ivan is referred to as a grand prince and in relations with the Livonian Order, both had the title of tsar.

Ivan's father empowered him to deal with most administrative and military affairs of the state in order to make ordinary Russian people think of him as their future ruler. In 1477, the Novgorodians sent both him and his father an embassy.

Russian chronicles mention Ivan's participation in military campaigns against Ibrahim of Kazan in 1468 and Novgorod in 1471. In 1476 and 1478, Ivan III put Ivan in charge of Moscow during his absence from the Russian capital.

In 1480, when Akhmat Khan moved towards the Russian borders, the grand prince sent Ivan the Young with numerous regiments to the Ugra River, leading to the beginning of the Great Stand on the Ugra River. Ivan III moved towards the Oka River, but soon returned to Moscow and demanded his son's return, fearing for his life. Ivan the Young refused to obey his father, however, who then ordered his assistant, Prince Kholmsky, to bring him back to the capital. Ivan insisted on staying on the shores of the Ugra. When the river froze up, Ivan moved north at the request of his father and went to Borovsk, where the grand prince held a defensive position. Akhmat Khan, however, chose to withdraw and the Russian army returned to Moscow.

In 1485, Ivan was rewarded with his mother's inheritance in Tver, and was installed as the ruler of that city, recently conquered by his father. Soon afterward, he fell ill with gout. His doctor, named Leon, bragged to Ivan III that he could cure him and began treatment with the grand prince's permission. Ivan's health continued to deteriorate until he finally died on 6 March 1490. Leon was later executed.

Ivan left a son named Dmitry Ivanovich from his marriage to Elena, daughter of the great Stephen III of Moldavia. Ivan III gave him the title of grand prince in 1498, though he fell out of favor in 1502 and was sent to prison, where he later died.

== See also ==
- Family tree of Russian monarchs

== Bibliography ==
- Bushkovitch, Paul (18 March 2021). Succession to the Throne in Early Modern Russia: The Transfer of Power 1450–1725. Cambridge University Press. ISBN 978-1-108-47934-9.
- Auty, Robert; Obolensky, Dimitri (1976). Companion to Russian Studies: Volume 1: An Introduction to Russian History. Cambridge University Press. p. 96. ISBN 978-0-521-28038-9.
