= Maria of Tver =

Grand Princess of Moscow from 1462 to 1467

Maria Borisovna
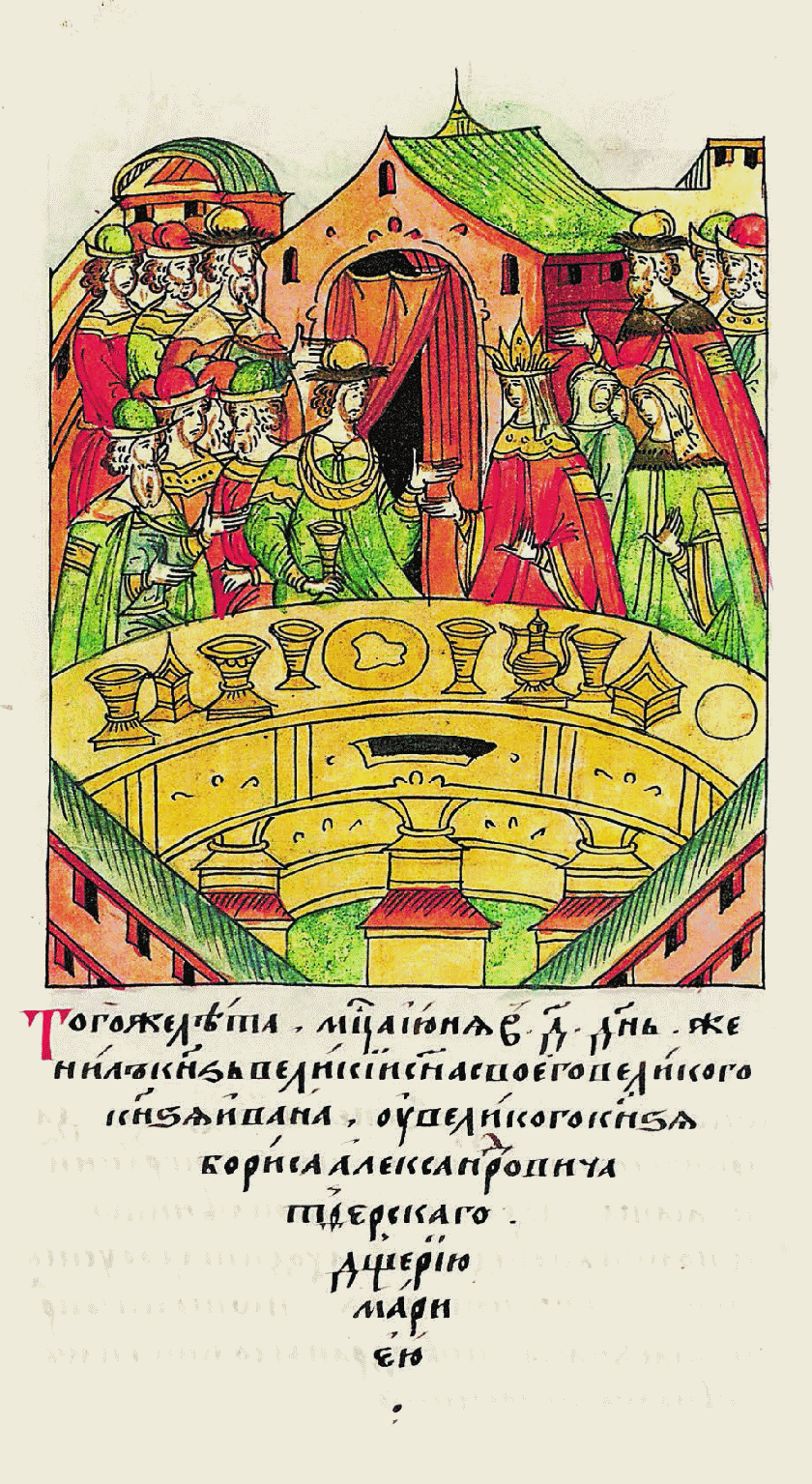
- Wedding of Maria and Ivan III, miniature from the Illustrated Chronicle of Ivan the Terrible

Grand Princess consort of Moscow
- Tenure: 28 March 1462 – 22 April 1467
- Predecessor: Maria of Borovsk
- Successor: Sophia Palaiologina
- Born: c. 1442; Tver
- Died: April 22, 1467 (aged 24–25); Moscow
- Burial: Ascension Convent, Kolomenskoye; Archangel Cathedral, Kremlin (1929)
- Spouse: Ivan III of Russia
- Issue: Ivan Ivanovich
- House: Rurik
- Father: Boris of Tver
- Religion: Russian Orthodox

Maria Borisovna of Tver (Russian: Мария Борисовна; 1442 – 22 April 1467) was the grand princess of Moscow as the first wife of Ivan III from 1462 until her death in 1467. She was the daughter of Boris of Tver.

== Biography ==
When Vasili II, Ivan III's father, was getting ready to attack Dmitry Shemyaka, he found an ally in the person of Boris of Tver. The two decided to seal the alliance by arranging a betrothal between the future Ivan III and Maria of Tver in 1452. It appears that she died from poisoning in 1467. However, according to Joseph Volotsky, she had been suffering from "infirmity" since childhood. She gave birth to Ivan the Young in 1458.

Maria of Tver Born: c. 1442? – 1467
Russian royalty
Vacant Title last held by Maria of Borovsk	Grand Princess of Moscow; 1462–1467	Vacant Title next held by Sophia Palaiologina
