= Ivan III of Russia =

Grand Prince of Moscow from 1462 to 1505

Ivan the Great
- Sovereign of all Russia
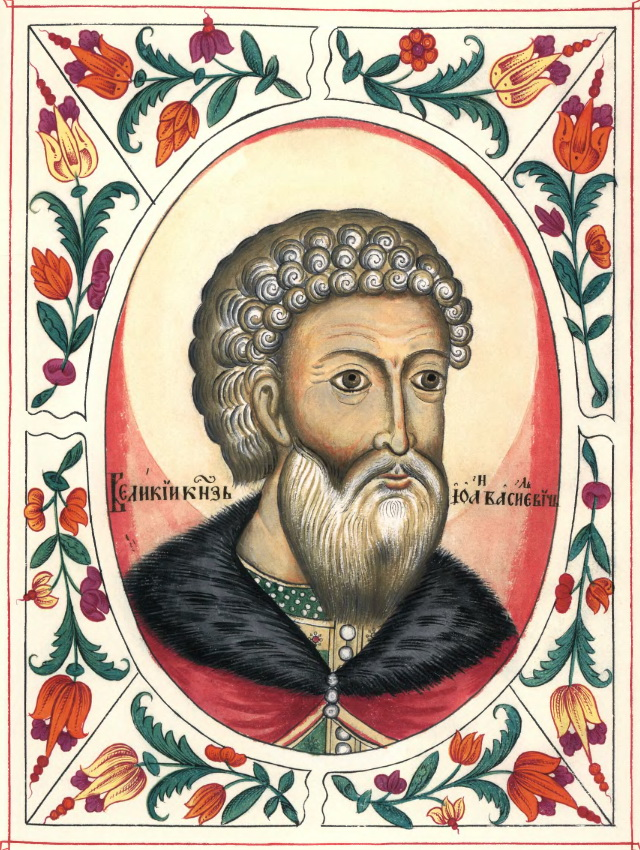
- Portrait in the Tsarsky titulyarnik, 1672

Grand Prince of Moscow and all Russia
- Reign: 28 March 1462 – 27 October 1505
- Coronation: 14 April 1502
- Predecessor: Vasily II
- Successor: Vasily III
- Co-monarch: Ivan Ivanovich (1471–1490); Dmitry Ivanovich (1498–1502); Vasily III (1502–1505)
- Born: 22 January 1440; Moscow, Grand Duchy of Moscow
- Died: 27 October 1505 (aged 65); Moscow, Grand Duchy of Moscow
- Burial: Cathedral of the Archangel, Moscow
- Consort: Maria of Tver; Sophia Palaiologina
- Issue more...: Ivan Ivanovich; Vasily III Ivanovich; Yury Ivanovich; Andrey Ivanovich; Elena Ivanovna
- House: Rurik
- Father: Vasily II of Moscow
- Mother: Maria of Borovsk
- Religion: Russian Orthodox

Ivan III Vasilyevich (Russian: Иван III Васильевич; 22 January 1440 – 27 October 1505), also known as Ivan the Great, (Note: Russian: Иван Великий.) was Grand Prince of Moscow and all Russia from 1462 until his death in 1505. (Note: Also rendered as Sovereign of all Rus' (Russian: Государь всея Руси).) Ivan served as the co-ruler and regent for his blind father Vasily II before he officially ascended the throne.

He multiplied the territory of his state through conquest, purchase, inheritance and the seizure of lands from his dynastic relatives, and laid the foundations of the centralized Russian state. He also renovated the Moscow Kremlin and introduced a new legal code. Ivan is credited with ending the dominance of the Tatars over Russia; his victory over the Great Horde in 1480 formally restored its independence.

Ivan began using the title tsar, and used the title tentatively until the Habsburgs recognized it. While officially using "tsar" in his correspondence with other monarchs, he was satisfied with the title of grand prince at home.

Through marriage to Sophia Palaiologina, Ivan made the double-headed eagle Russia's coat of arms, and adopted the idea of Moscow as the third Rome. His 43-year reign was the second-longest in Russian history, after that of his grandson Ivan IV.

== Early life ==
Ivan Vasilyevich was born on 22 January 1440 into the family of Vasily II, the grand prince of Moscow, and Maria of Borovsk, the daughter of an appanage prince and a granddaughter of Vladimir the Bold.

The first time Ivan is called heir and grand prince in treaties between his father and other Russian princes is in a treaty with Ivan Vasilyevich of Suzdal dating from 1448 or 1449. The title of grand prince is not included in a treaty with Casimir IV of Poland dating from 13 August 1449, but appears again in treaties with Vasily Yaroslavich of Serpukhov in the early 1450s.

Ivan had four brothers: Yury, Andrey Bolshoy ("the big"), Boris, and Andrey Menshoy ("the little"). In the same will that Vasily II had given Ivan III the grand principality, his brothers were awarded appanages. Yury was given Dmitrov, Mozhaysk and Serpukhov, Andrey Bolshoy was given Uglich, Bezhetsk and Verkh and Zvenigorod, Boris was given Volokolamsk, Rzhev and Ruza, while Andrey Menshoy was given Vologda.

== Reign ==
=== Territorial expansion and centralisation ===
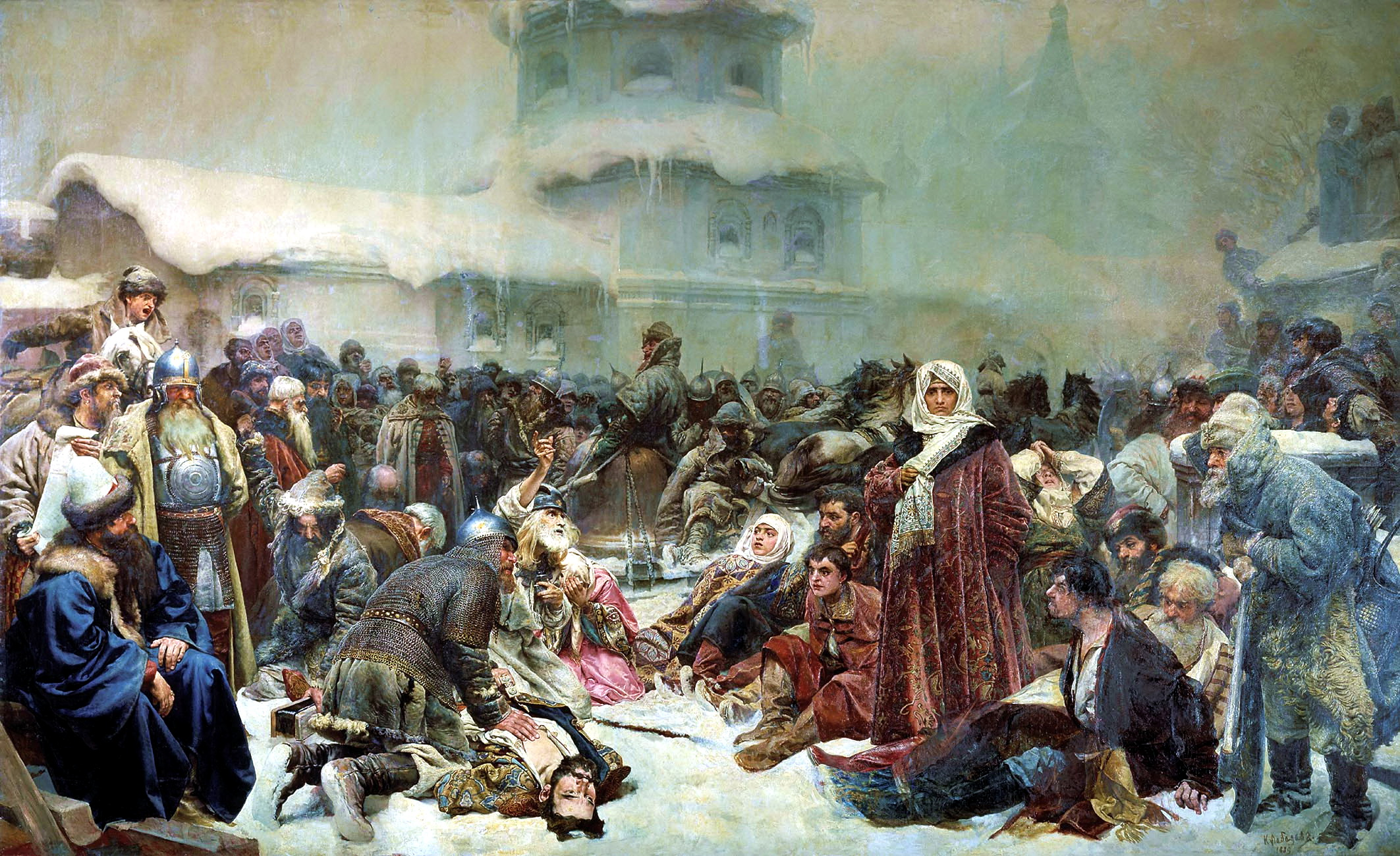
Ivan's destruction of the Novgorod veche, painting by Klavdy Lebedev (1889)

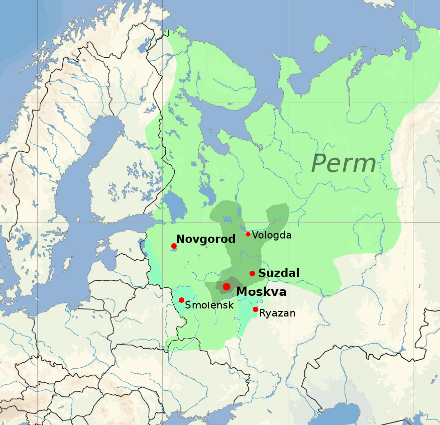
Expansion of Moscow from 1300 to 1505

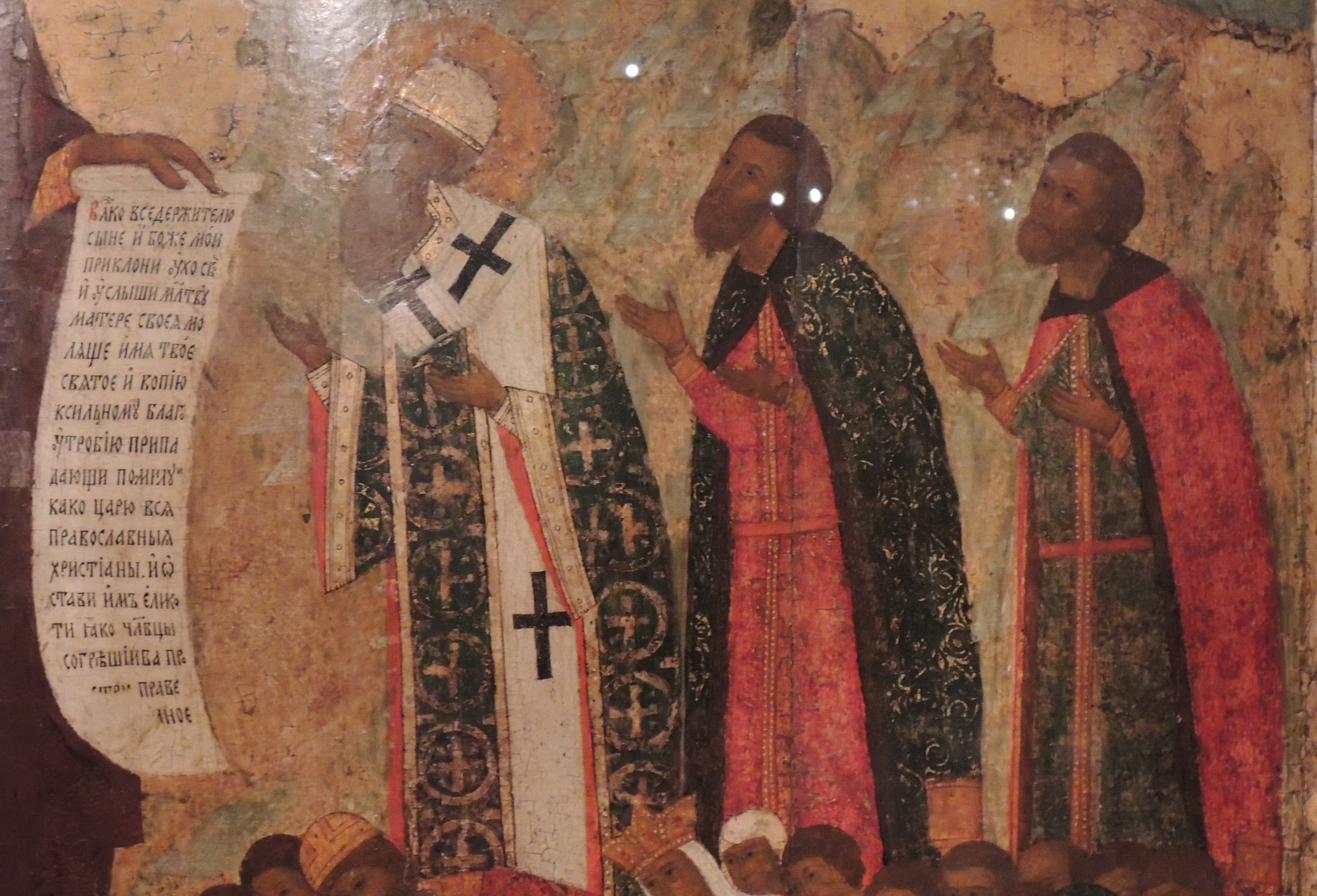
Variant of the Theotokos of Bogolyubovo showing Metropolitan Jonah, Vasily II and Ivan III leading the classes of society, early 16th century

Ivan's rule is marked by vastly expanding the territory and his control of the Muscovy. As part of the successful "gathering of the Russian lands", Ivan brought the independent duchies of different Rurikid princes under the direct control of Moscow, leaving the princes and their posterity without royal titles or land inheritance. It was during Ivan's reign that the emergence of a centralized Russian state occurred following a period of feudal fragmentation, with Moscow at its center.

Following a war with the Novgorod Republic in 1456, due to Novgorod's support of the rebellious Dmitry Shemyaka against Vasily II in his civil war, Moscow began to gradually seize land in the northern territories that were formerly under Novgorodian control for the next decade and half due to a desire for luxury furs in the area. This led to a struggle with Novgorod for the Russian fur trade, and thus, an economic rivalry for fur, land and trade ports. Some Novgorodian boyars were opposed to Moscow as a result, while others pursued a pro-Moscow policy in the hopes that good relations could reduce disruption in east-west trade, while Novgorod was also dependent on the Russian lands to its southwest for important imports such as grain. Some Novgorodians were also attracted to Moscow due to it being the center of Russian Orthodoxy as opposed to Lithuania, where Catholicism was dominant and its culture was being increasingly polonised, though some Novgorodian clergy adopted a pro-Lithuanian policy for political reasons due to fears that embracing the grand prince of Moscow would eventually lead to the end of Novgorod's independence.

By 1470, with the pro-Lithuanian faction being dominant, the Novgorodian boyars questioned Ivan's sovereignty over the city-state as their prince. Novgorod negotiated with the Grand Duchy of Lithuania and requested Casimir IV to send them a prince. This led to Mikhailo Olelkovich, Ivan's cousin, being accepted as the new prince, though he would step down as prince shortly after. Ivan saw the actions of Novgorod as a cause for war, and he also called it an act of apostasy from Orthodoxy (in part, because Poland and its monarchs were Catholic). Ivan led his troops to Novgorod where his army defeated the Novgorodians at the Battle of Shelon on 14 July 1471. Ivan then had the four leaders of the anti-Moscow faction in Novgorod executed, including the son of Marfa Boretskaya, an influential boyar woman who had played a leading role in the faction. In a peace treaty signed on 11 August 1471, Novgorod agreed to abandon its overtures to Lithuania and to cede a considerable portion of its northern territories, while paying a war indemnity of 15,500 rubles. Novgorod also had to recognize Moscow's claims to territories to the east of the Northern Dvina which they had been struggling over. Ivan took a promise of allegiance from Novgorod, but left its system of government in place.

For the next six years, pro-Moscow and anti-Moscow factions in Novgorod competed with one another. Ivan visited Novgorod several times during this period, persecuting a number of pro-Lithuanian boyars and confiscating their lands. In 1477, two Novgorodian envoys, claiming to have been sent by the archbishops and the entire city, addressed Ivan in public audience as gosudar (sovereign) instead of the usual gospodin (sir). Ivan at once seized upon this as a recognition of his sovereignty, and when the Novgorodians repudiated the envoys (indeed, one was killed at the veche and several others of the pro-Moscow faction were killed with him) and swore openly in front of the Moscow ambassadors that they would turn to Lithuania again, he marched against them. Surrounded by Ivan's army, Novgorod ultimately recognized Ivan's direct rule over the city and its vast hinterland in a document signed and sealed by Archbishop Feofil of Novgorod (1470–1480) on 15 January 1478.

Ivan dispossessed Novgorod of more than four-fifths of its land, keeping half for himself and giving the other half to his allies. Subsequent revolts (1479–1488) were punished by the removal en masse of the richest and most ancient families of Novgorod to Moscow, Vyatka, and other cities. Many merchants, landholders, and boyars were replaced with loyalists who came from Moscow. The Novgorod veche and its elected offices were also abolished. Archbishop Feofil was also removed to Moscow for plotting against the grand prince. The rival republic of Pskov owed the continuance of its own political existence to the readiness with which it assisted Ivan against its old enemy. The acquisition of Novgorod alone nearly doubled the size of his realm. Soon after the formal annexation of Novgorod, Ivan assumed the title of sovereign of all Russia (gosudar vseya Rusi); the title reflected his achievements in uniting the Russian lands but also implied claims to other territories inhabited by the East Slavs which were under the control of the Lithuanian grand dukes, and would later lead to conflict with the Grand Duchy of Lithuania.

Other principalities were eventually absorbed by conquest, purchase, or marriage contract: the Principality of Yaroslavl in 1463, Rostov in 1474, Tver in 1485, and Vyatka 1489. Ivan also increased Moscow's dominance over Pskov, with his son and successor Vasily III formally annexing it in 1510. Prince Mikhail Andreyevich of Vereya, who had been awarded an appanage by Vasily II, was pressured in 1478 into giving Belozersk to Ivan, who received all of Mikhail's land on his death in 1486. Some princes from the Upper Oka region, who had been under Lithuanian rule, left Lithuanian service and joined the Muscovite court in the 1480s, including the Vorotynskys, Odoyevskys, Gorchakovs, and others. A peace treaty signed on 5 February 1494 legalized the acquisitions. Moscow also subjugated several Finno-Ugric tribes to the east of Vyatka in the late 15th century, some of whom had fled eastward as far as the Ob River, but by 1500, they were all paying tribute.

Ivan III also conducted a series of military campaigns against the principalities of Yugra, pushing eastward. Following the second campaign in 1483, Yugra was included in the title of the grand prince, and the princes of Yugra swore allegiance to Ivan.

Whereas his father Vasily II followed the custom of dividing the realm between his sons, seeing this as a cause for weakness and instability, Ivan consolidated his exclusive control over Muscovy during his reign. Ivan's refusal to share his conquests with his brothers, and his subsequent interference with the internal politics of their inherited principalities, involved him in several wars with them, from which, though the princes were assisted by Lithuania, he emerged victorious. Finally, Ivan's new rule of government, formally set forth in his last will to the effect that the domains of all his kinsfolk, after their deaths, should pass directly to the reigning grand prince instead of reverting, as hitherto, to the princes' heirs, put an end once and for all to these semi-independent princelings.

Ivan had four brothers. The eldest, Yury, died childless on 12 September 1472. He only had a draft of a will that said nothing about his land. Ivan seized the land, much to the fury of the surviving brothers, whom he placated with some land. Boris and Andrey Bolshoy signed treaties with Vasily in February and September 1473. They agreed to protect each other's land and not to have secret dealings with foreign states; they broke this clause in 1480, fleeing to Lithuania. It is unknown whether Andrey Menshoy signed a treaty. He died in 1481, leaving his lands to Ivan. In 1491, Andrey Bolshoy was arrested by Ivan for refusing to aid the Crimean Khanate against the Golden Horde. He died in prison in 1493, and Ivan seized his land. In 1494, Boris, the only brother able to pass his land to his sons, died. However, their land reverted to the tsar upon their deaths in 1503 and 1515 respectively.

=== Domestic policy ===
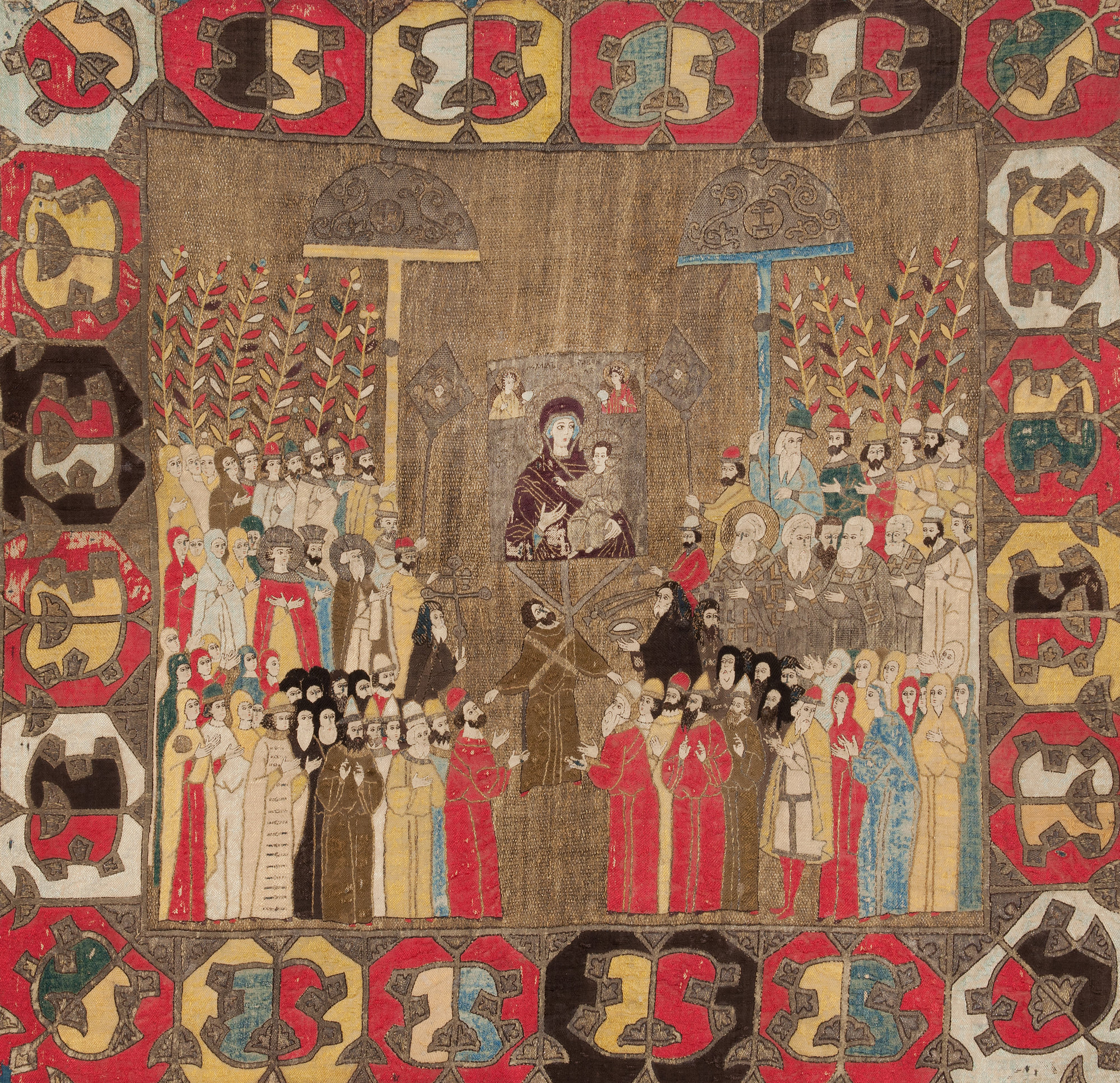
Depiction of Palm Sunday procession with Ivan III and his family, including his son Vasili and grandson Dmitry, on a shroud belonging to Elena Voloshanka, c. 1498.

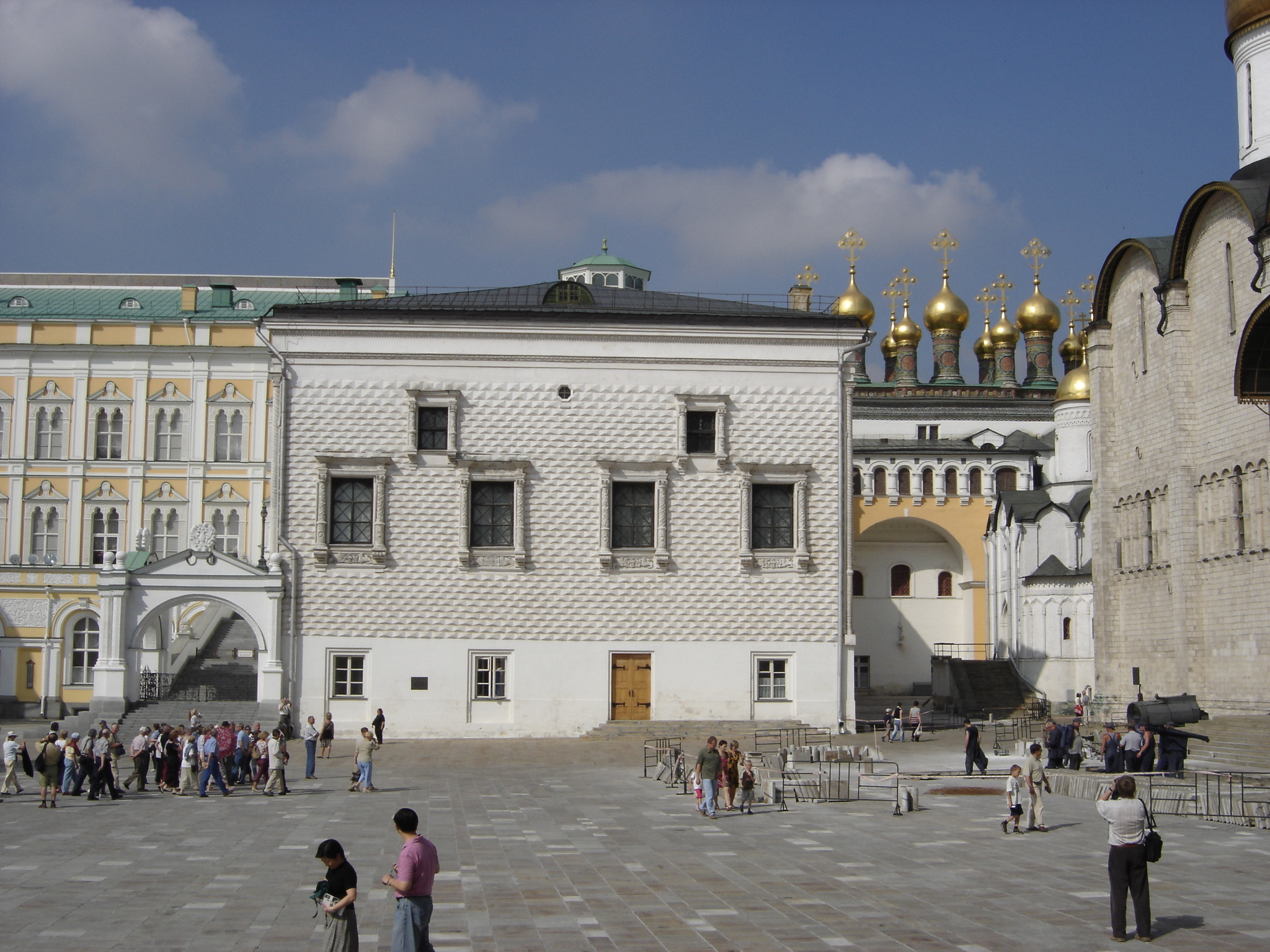
The Palace of Facets (1487–91) was commissioned by Ivan to Italian architects.

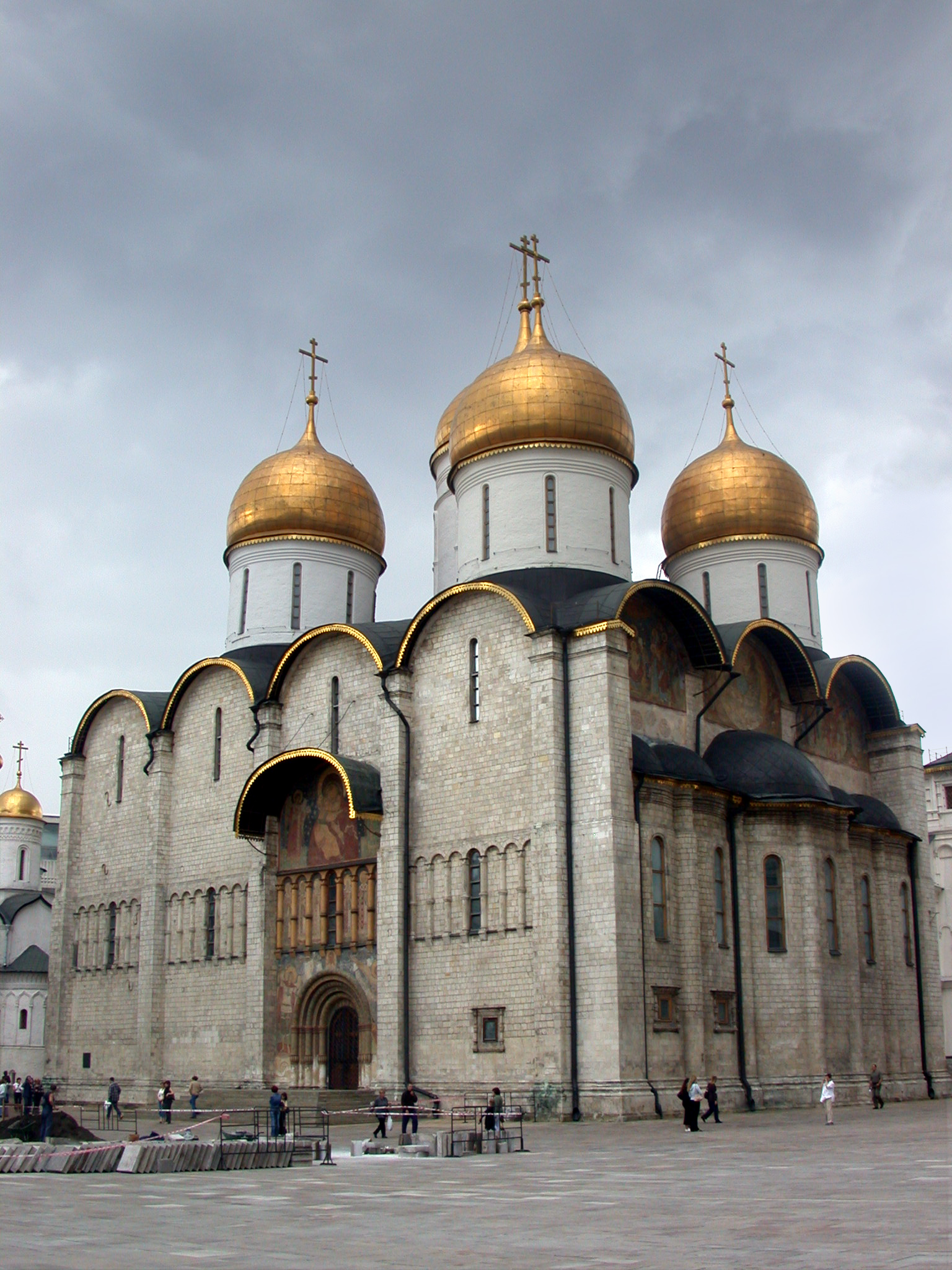
The Dormition Cathedral by Fioravanti laid claim as the mother church of all Rus'.

The character of the government of Moscow changed significantly under Ivan III, taking on a new autocratic form, as Moscow increased its hegemony, but also to new imperial pretensions. After the fall of Constantinople, Orthodox canonists were inclined to regard the grand princes of Moscow, where the Metropolitan of Kiev moved in 1325 after the Mongol invasions, as the successors of the Byzantine emperors. Ivan himself appeared to welcome the idea, and he began to use the title of tsar in foreign correspondence, meaning caesar.

The adoption of Byzantine symbolism and its ceremonial style in effect allowed for the Muscovite grand prince to claim the powers of that of a Byzantine emperor. Russian ruling circles were already well aware of Byzantine traditions, including the court, hierarchy, and symbolism, due in part to most of the Kievan metropolitans and clerics of the Russian Orthodox Church having been Greeks. The Russians had also long called the Byzantine emperor tsar, and had known of the South Slavic writers who gave the title to their most successful rulers. A Serbian monk who had arrived in Moscow in the early 1440s helped to provide the foundation for the title, having composed a "chronograph" which included the prophecy of a "Russian" clan coming to rule in Constantinople. He also referred to the Muscovite grand prince as the "Orthodox tsar and autocrat" following the Council of Florence.

This movement coincided with a change in the family circumstances of Ivan III. After the death of his first consort in 1467, Maria of Tver, and at the suggestion of Pope Paul II in 1469, who hoped thereby to bind Moscow to the Holy See, Ivan III wedded Sophia Palaiologina (also known under her original name Zoe) in 1472, daughter of Thomas Palaeologus, despot of Morea, who claimed the throne of Constantinople as the brother of Constantine XI, the last Byzantine emperor. Frustrating the Pope's hopes of reuniting the two faiths, the princess endorsed Eastern Orthodoxy. Due to her family traditions, she encouraged imperial ideas in the mind of her consort. It was through her influence that the ceremonious etiquette of Constantinople (along with the imperial double-headed eagle and all that it implied) was adopted by the court of Moscow. Ivan combined the double-headed eagle with his emblem of Saint George slaying the dragon; his family seal became and remained a symbol of the Russian tsars until the monarchy was abolished in 1917. Ivan's marriage would add to Moscow's prestige after the Russian Orthodox Church had earlier declared itself autocephalous in 1448, and a native metropolitan was installed in Moscow. The transformation to absolutism was supported by the Russian Orthodox Church, which benefitted from Moscow's increased international standing, with the doctrine of Moscow as the "third Rome" beginning to emerge.

Ivan's son with Maria of Tver, Ivan Ivanovich, whom he had designated as his heir and was made co-ruler in 1471, died in 1490, leaving from his marriage with Elena of Moldavia an only child, Dmitry Ivanovich. Ivan attempted to secure his title for his successor, and the latter was crowned as successor by his grandfather on 15 February 1498, but later Ivan reverted his decision in favor of Sophia's elder son Vasily, who was ultimately crowned co-regent with his father on 14 April 1502. The decision was dictated by the crisis connected with the Sect of Skhariya the Jew, as well as by the imperial prestige of Sophia's descendants. Dmitry was put into prison, where he died, unmarried and childless, in 1509, already under the rule of his uncle. His successor Vasily was made co-ruler in 1502, and during Vasily's reign, he would expand the usage of the title of tsar in all matters.

The grand prince increasingly held aloof from his boyars, who were a barrier to the transformation to absolutism. As a result, he gradually reduced the boyars' economic and political powers. He granted estates called pomestie to a new noble class in exchange for military service and other conditions, allowing him to build up a centralized army and create a counterbalance to the boyars. The old patriarchal systems of government vanished. The boyars, who would meet in a council known as a boyar duma, were no longer consulted on state affairs. The sovereign became sacrosanct, while the boyars were reduced to dependency on the will of the sovereign. The boyars naturally resented this revolution and struggled against it.

It was in the reign of Ivan III that the new sudebnik, or law code, was compiled by the scribe, Vladimir Gusev. The death penalty was mandated for rebellion or sedition, which was a more severe penalty compared to that of the earlier Russkaya Pravda. It restricted the mobility of peasants, also requiring an exit fee to be paid to the landlords, which were in the interests of the new noble class. Ivan therefore laid the groundwork for serfdom, which would negatively impact Russia's development in the following centuries.

Ivan did his utmost to make his capital a worthy successor to Constantinople, and with that object invited many foreign masters and artificers to settle in Moscow. Ivan's most notable construction was the rebuilding of the Kremlin in Moscow. The most noted of these architects was the Italian Ridolfo di Fioravante, nicknamed "Aristotle" because of his extraordinary knowledge, who built several cathedrals and palaces in the Kremlin, and also supervised the construction of the walls of the Kremlin. These include the Dormition Cathedral and Palace of Facets. Construction of the Ivan the Great Bell Tower also started in 1505, which was completed after his death.

=== Foreign policy ===
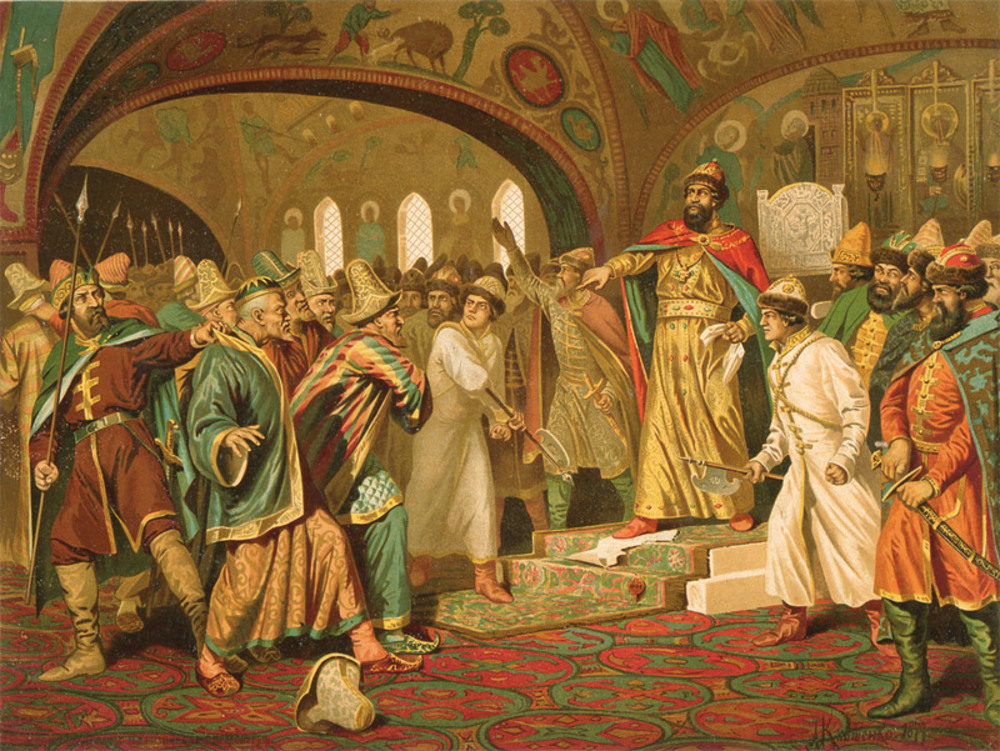
Ivan III tearing the khan's letter to pieces, an apocryphal 19th-century painting by Aleksey Kivshenko

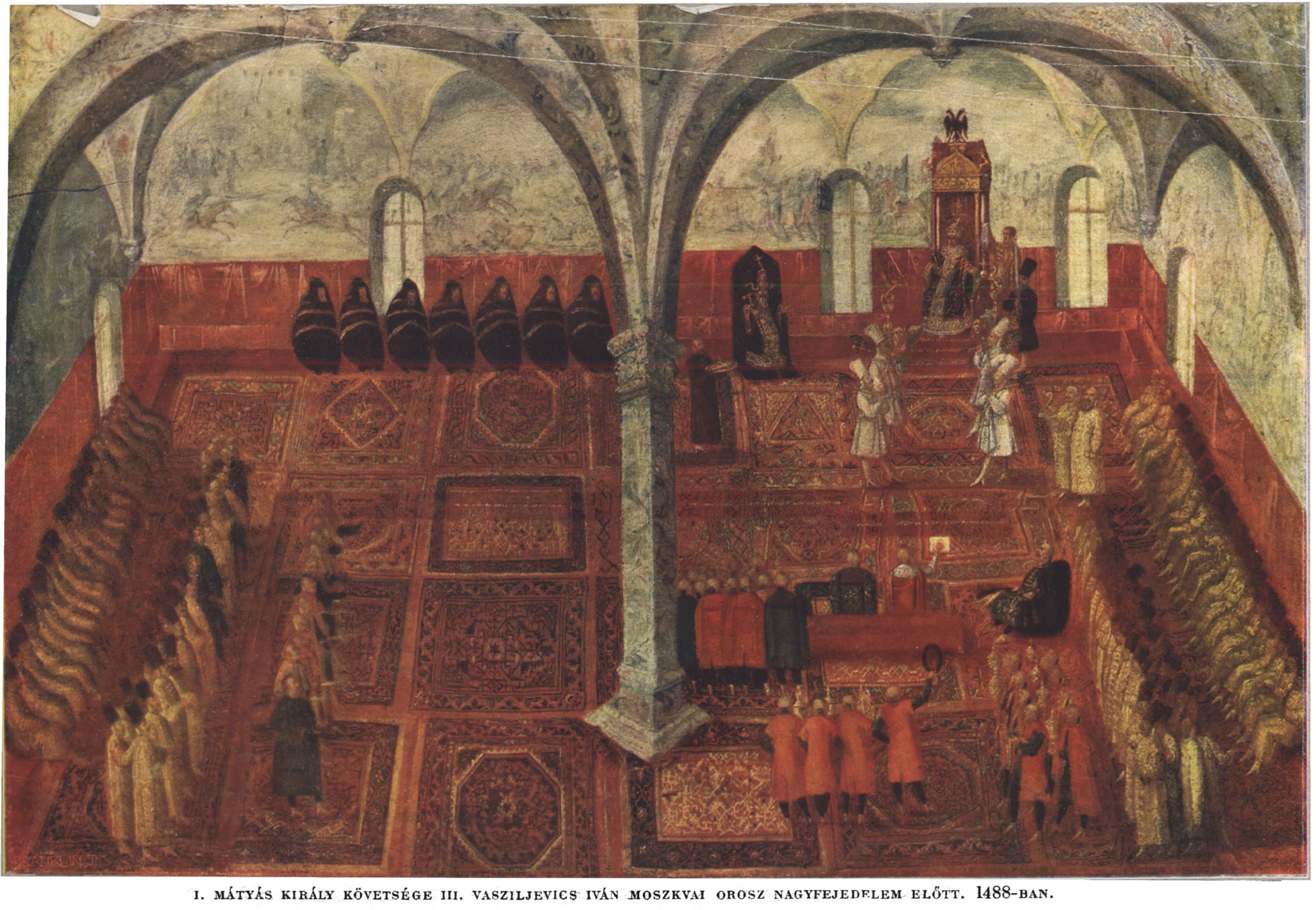
The 1488 Hungarian legation in the court of Ivan III

Moscow played an increasingly visible role in international affairs as it established diplomatic relations with the Crimean Khanate and the Republic of Venice in 1474, the Kingdom of Hungary in 1482, the Holy Roman Empire in 1489, the Kingdom of Denmark in 1493, and the Ottoman Empire in 1496. The outline of Russian foreign policy for the next several generations was shaped during Ivan's reign, where his successors would continue to struggle with Poland and Lithuania over the territories of the East Slavs, while a more differentiated policy was pursued towards the Muslim khanates, with attempts at subjugating the Khanate of Kazan and neutralizing the Crimean Khanate.

In 1476, Ivan refused to pay the customary tribute to Ahmed Khan, and in 1480, Ahmed Khan launched an invasion of Russia. Throughout the autumn, the Muscovite and Tatar hosts confronted each other on opposite sides of the Ugra River until 11 November 1480, when Ahmed retreated into the steppe. In traditional Russian historiography, it is marked as the end of the "Tatar yoke" over Russia. In the following year, Ahmed Khan, while preparing a second expedition against Moscow, was suddenly attacked, routed and slain by Khan Ibak of the Nogai Horde, whereupon the Golden Horde suddenly fell to pieces. In 1487, Ivan reduced the Khanate of Kazan, one of the offshoots of the Horde, to the condition of a vassal state, though in his later years, it broke away from his suzerainty. With the other Muslim powers, the khan of the Crimean Khanate and the sultans of the Ottoman Empire, Ivan's relations were peaceful and even amicable. The Crimean khan, Meñli I Giray, helped him against the Grand Duchy of Lithuania, and facilitated the opening of diplomatic relations between Moscow and Constantinople, where the first embassy appeared in 1495.

The Christian rulers in the Caucasus began to see the Russian monarchs as their natural allies against the Muslim regional powers. The first attempt at forging an alliance was made by Alexander I, king of a small Georgian kingdom of Kakheti, who dispatched two embassies, in 1483 and 1491, to Moscow. However, as the Russians were still too far from the Caucasus, neither of these missions had any effect on the course of events in the region. In 1488, Ivan sought gun founders, master gunners for siege cannons, gold and silversmiths, and Italian master builders from King Matthias Corvinus.

In his dealings with the Habsburgs, Ivan was offered the title of king (rex) if he would join the alliance against Turkey, but he rejected such offers and continued his own policy, laying claim to the Kievan legacy and adopting the title of autocrat (samoderzhets), sovereign (gosudar) of the Russian land, and grand prince of Moscow and all Russia. Beginning in 1484, Ivan began to use the title of tsar in his foreign correspondence with secondary powers in Europe, including the Livonian Order. At times the title was translated as imperator, such as in a 1493 treaty with Denmark where Ivan was called "domino Johanne totius Rutzie imperator". Ivan also began insisting on the title to the Habsburgs in 1489, and he continued to portray himself to his subjects and foreign states as the Orthodox emperor. Whenever was possible in diplomatic situations, Ivan and his representatives would refer to him as tsar. Isabel de Madariaga believes that, had the title of Russian monarchs continued to be translated as rex, Russia's assimilation into the ranking order of states in Europe would have been "much easier".

In Nordic affairs, Ivan concluded an offensive alliance with John of Denmark and maintained regular correspondence with Emperor Maximilian I, who called him a "brother". He built a strong citadel in Ingria, named Ivangorod after himself, situated on the Russian-Estonian border, opposite the fortress of Narva held by the Livonian Confederation. In the Russo-Swedish War, Ivan unsuccessfully attempted to conquer Vyborg from Sweden, but this attempt was checked by the Swedish garrison in Vyborg Castle led by Lord Knut Posse.

Ivan deemed Moscow to be the legitimate heir to the territories that formerly belonged to Kievan Rus', leading to wars with Lithuania, including skirmishes in the late 1480s and early 1490s. The further extension of his dominion was facilitated by the death of Casimir IV in 1492, when Poland and Lithuania once again parted company. The throne of Lithuania was now occupied by Casimir's son Alexander, a weak and lethargic prince so incapable of defending his possessions against the persistent attacks of the Muscovites that he attempted to save them by a matrimonial compact, wedding Helena, Ivan's daughter. But the clear determination of Ivan to appropriate as much of Lithuania as possible finally compelled Alexander to take up arms against his father-in-law in 1499. A full-scale war broke out in 1500. The Lithuanians were routed at the Battle of Vedrosha on 14 July 1500, and in 1503, Alexander was glad to purchase peace by ceding Chernigov, Starodub, Novgorod-Seversky, and sixteen other towns. (Note: Much information on Ivan III and his court is contained in Sigismund von Herberstein, Notes on Muscovite Affairs (1549)) However, Smolensk remained in Lithuanian hands, though Ivan's son Vasily III would take the city in 1514.

== Legacy ==
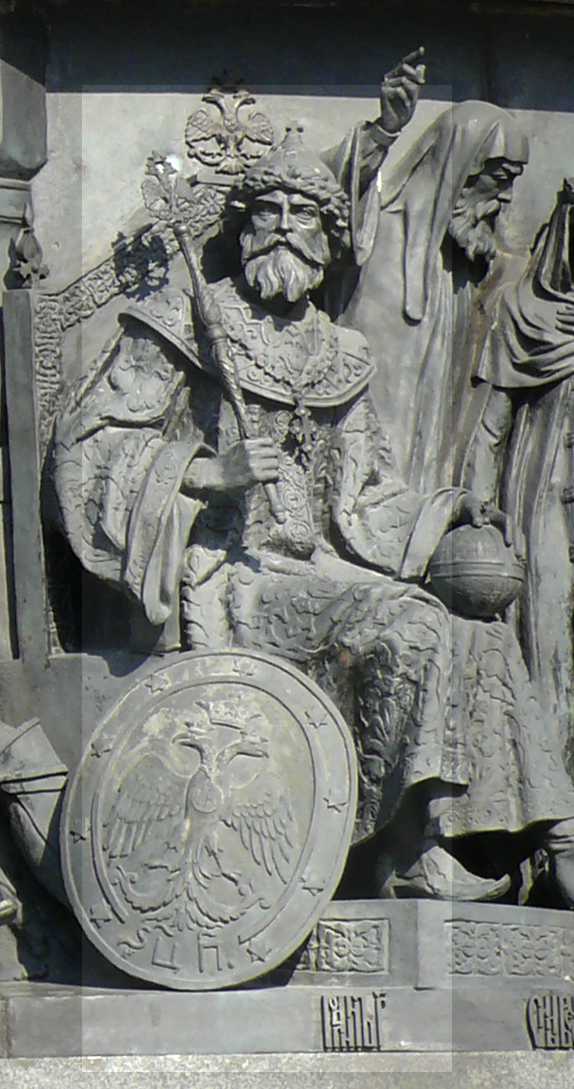
Ivan III on the "Millennium of Russia" monument in Veliky Novgorod

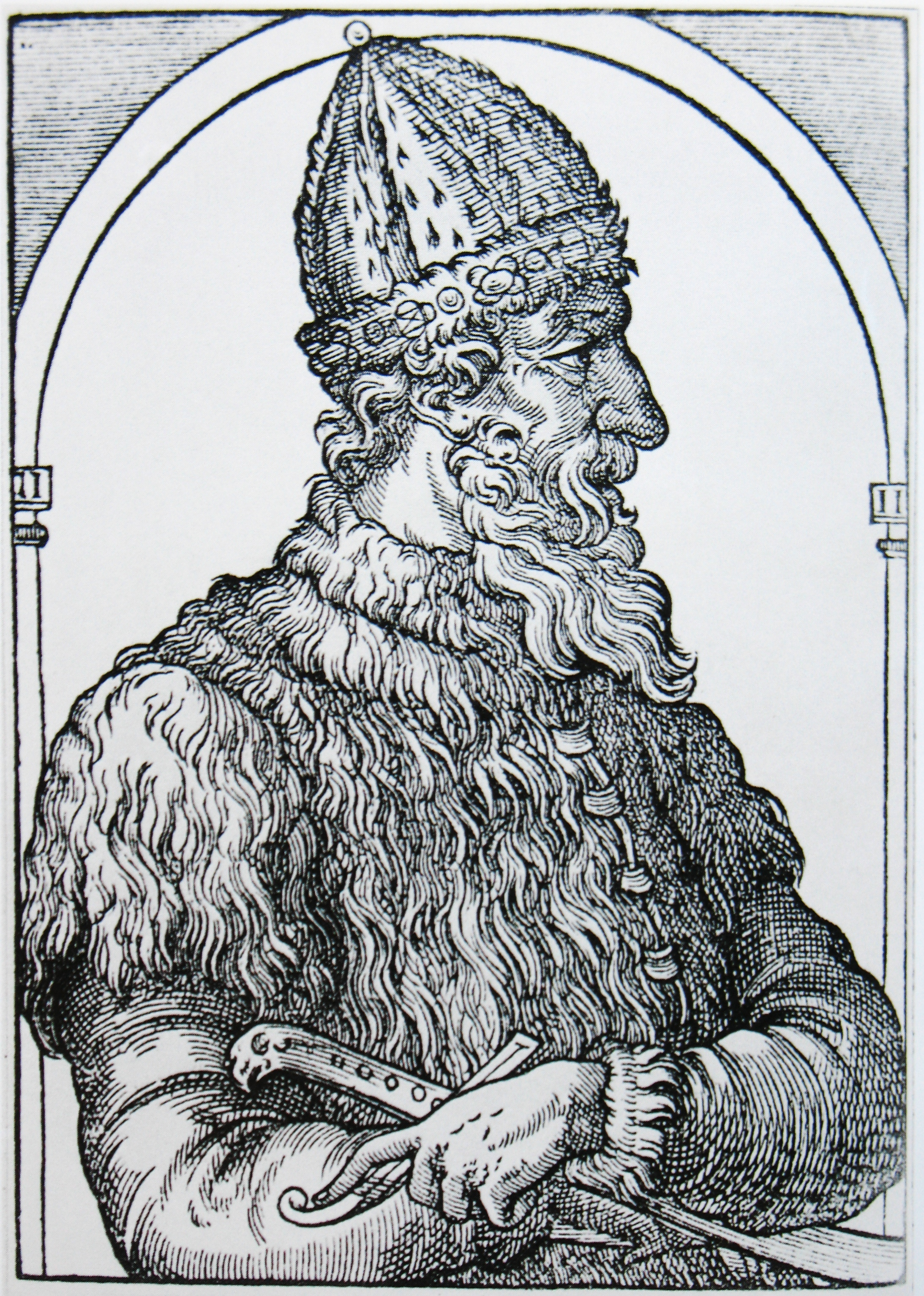
Engraving by André Thevet, 1575

Ivan conquered or brought under his control the lands of "Great Russia", leading to Russian historians to call him the "gatherer of the Russian lands". Ivan therefore arguably became best known for his consolidation of Muscovite rule; his contemporaries and later historians saw Ivan as a skilled politician who was consistent and efficient in the construction of a unified and autocratic Russian state. His predecessors had increased Moscow's territory from less than 600 square miles (1,600 square kilometres) under Ivan II (r. 1353–1359) to more than 15,000 square miles (39,000 square kilometres) at the end of Vasily II's reign. It remained for Ivan III to absorb Moscow's old rivals, Novgorod and Tver, and establish virtually a single rule over what had been appanages. Although the circumstances surrounding the acquisitions varied, the results were basically the same: former sovereign or semi-autonomous principalities were reduced to the status of provinces of Moscow, while their princes joined the ranks of the Muscovite service nobility.

After the death of his first wife in 1467, Ivan married Sophia (Zoë) Palaiologina in 1472, a Byzantine princess and niece of the last Byzantine emperor, Constantine XI, who was killed in battle in 1453. The Vatican sponsored the marriage in hope of bringing Moscow under the sway of the Pope and of establishing a broad front against the Turks, a goal that failed. From Ivan's point of view, the marriage fitted well into the general trend of elevating the Muscovite ruler.

Following his second marriage, Ivan developed a complicated court ceremonial on the Byzantine model and began to use the title of "tsar" and "autocrat". Also during the reign of Ivan and his son, Vasily III, Moscow came to be referred to by spokesmen as the third Rome. Philotheos, a monk from Pskov, developed the idea of Moscow as the true successor to Byzantium and, hence, to Rome.

An impressive building program in Moscow took place under Ivan, directed primarily by Italian artists and craftsmen. New buildings were erected in the Kremlin in Moscow, and its walls were strengthened and furnished with towers and gates. In 1475, Ivan III established the first cannon foundry of Russia in Moscow, which started native cannon production.

The British historian John Lister Illingworth Fennell emphasizes Ivan's military and economic success, as well as his success in centralizing control over local rulers; however, he stated that his reign was also marked by cultural depression, lack of freedom, and isolation from the West.

During Ivan's reign, "the Russian state was consolidated, Russian territory tripled in size, trade expanded, and Western contacts shaped society". Tatar rule formally ended and Ivan elevated the principality to a sovereign nation, leading to him to be called "Ivan the Great". Ivan died on 27 October 1505, and was succeeded by his son, Vasily III.

== Title ==
In the 1480s, during his consolidation of territories, Ivan III had the following title: "By the Grace of God, the Great Sovereign of the Russian land, Grand Prince Ivan Vasilyevich, Tsar of all Russia, Vladimir, and Moscow, and Novgorod, and Pskov, and Yugorsk, and Vyatka, and Perm, and others". (Note: "Божиею милостью великий осподарь Русские земли велики князь Иван Васильевич, царь всеа Русии, Володимерськи и Московски и Новгородски и Псковски и Югорски и Вятски и Пермськи и иных".)

At the beginning of the 1490s, he also had the following title: "Ivan, by the Grace of God, Sovereign of all Russia and Grand Prince of Vladimir, and Moscow, and Novgorod, and Pskov, and Tver, and Yugorsk, and Perm, and Bulgar, and others". (Note: "Иван Божией милостию государь всеа Руси и великий князь Владимирский, и Московский, и Новгородский, и Псковский, и Тверской, и Югорский, и Пръмскы, и Болъгарский и иных".)

=== Seal ===
Following his marriage to Sophia Palaiologina, Ivan combined the double-headed eagle with his emblem of Saint George slaying the dragon.

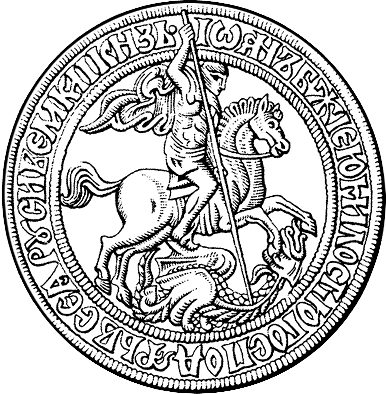

Obverse of Ivan III's seal in 1489 with Saint George slaying the dragon

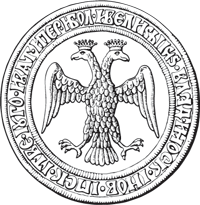

Reverse of Ivan III's seal in 1489 with the double-headed eagle

== Marriages and children ==
1. By Maria of Tver:

- Ivan Ivanovich (Ivan the Young) (15 February 1458 – 7 March 1490).

2. By Sophia Palaiologina:

- Anna (born 1474), died in infancy ;
- Elena (born 1475), died in infancy ;
- Feodosia (born 1475–?) ;
- Helena (19 May 1476 – 20 January 1513), Grand Duchess of Lithuania and Queen of Poland ;
- Vasily III (25 March 1479 – 3 December 1533), Grand Prince of Moscow and all Russia ;
- Yury Ivanovich (23 March 1480 – 8 March 1536) ;
- Dmitry Ivanovich (6 October 1481 – 14 February 1521) ;
- Eudoxia Ivanovna (1492 – 1513); married Peter (born Kudaikul), son of Ibrahim, Khan of Kazan. Had issue, one daughter: Anastasia Petrovna, wife of Fyodor Mstislavsky, and later of Vasily "Nemoy" Shuisky ;
- Simeon Ivanovich (21 March 1487 – 26 June 1518) ;
- Andrey of Staritsa (5 August 1490 – 11 December 1537).

== See also ==
- Family tree of Russian monarchs

== Bibliography ==
- Alef, Gustave (1983). Rulers and Nobles in Fifteenth-Century Muscovy. Surrey, England: Ashgate Publishing. ISBN 978-0860781202.
- Auty, Robert; Obolensky, Dimitri (1976). Companion to Russian Studies: Volume 1: An Introduction to Russian History. Cambridge University Press. ISBN 978-0-521-28038-9.
- Bogatyrev, Sergei (April 2007). "Reinventing the Russian Monarchy in the 1550s: Ivan the Terrible, the Dynasty, and the Church". The Slavonic and East European Review. 85 (2). London, England: University College London. doi:10.1353/see.2007.0067.
- Boguslavsky, V. V. (2001). Kuksina, E. I. (ed.). Slavyanskaya entsiklopediya. Kievskaya Rus'-Moskoviya Славянская энциклопедия. Киевская Русь-Московия [Slavic Encyclopedia. Kievan Rus'-Muscovy] (in Russian). Vol. 1. Moscow: Olma-Press. ISBN 5-224-02249-5.
- Bushkovitch, Paul (2012). A Concise History of Russia. New York: Cambridge University Press. ISBN 9780521543231.
- Bushkovitch, Paul (2021). Succession to the throne in early modern Russia: the transfer of power 1450-1725 (1st ed.). Cambridge, United Kingdom: Cambridge University Press. ISBN 9781108479349.
- Crummey, Robert O. (2013). The Formation of Muscovy 1300-1613. Longman History of Russia. London, New York: Routledge. ISBN 9780582491533.
- Fennell, John Lister Illingworth (December 1960). "The Dynastic Crisis 1497–1502". The Slavonic and East European Review. 39 (92). London, England: University College London.
- Fennell, John Lister Illingworth (1961). Ivan the Great of Moscow. New York City: Macmillan. ASIN B0007IL6Q2.
- Filjushkin, Alexander (2006). Tituly russkikh gosudarey Титулы русских государей [The Titles of Russian Rulers] (in Russian). Moscow, St. Petersburg: Al'yans-Arkheo. ISBN 9785988740117.
- Filjushkin, Alexander (2008). Ivan the Terrible: a Military History. London: Frontline Books. ISBN 9781848325043.
- Franklin, Simon; Widdis, Emma (2006). National Identity in Russian Culture: An Introduction. Cambridge, England: Cambridge University Press. ISBN 9780521024297.
- "Karamsin's History of Russia". The Foreign Quarterly Review. 3. London: Treuttel and Würtz, Treuttel, Jun. and Richter. 1829.
- Hamilton, Neil A. (1 December 1995). Founders of Modern Nations: A Biographical Dictionary. Bloomsbury Academic. ISBN 978-0-87436-750-8.
- Hosking, Geoffrey Alan (2001). Russia and the Russians: A History. Cambridge, Massachusetts: Harvard University Press. ISBN 9780674004733.
- Kort, Michael (2008). A Brief History of Russia. New York: Infobase Publishing. ISBN 9781438108292.
- Letiche, John M.; Pashkov, A. I., eds. (1964). A History of Russian Economic Thought : Ninth Through Eighteenth Centuries. Berkeley: University of California Press.
- MacKenzie, David; Curran, Michael W. (2002). A History of Russia, the Soviet Union, and Beyond (6th ed.). Belmont, CA: Wadsworth/Thomson Learning. ISBN 9780534586980.
- Madariaga, Isabel De (17 June 2014). Politics and Culture in Eighteenth-Century Russia: Collected Essays by Isabel de Madariaga. Routledge. ISBN 978-1-317-88190-2.
- Millar, James R. (2004). Encyclopedia of Russian History. New York: Macmillan Reference USA. ISBN 9780028656939.
- Monter, William (2006). Cultural Exchange in Early Modern Europe, Volume 4. Cambridge, England: Cambridge University Press. ISBN 9780521855532.
- Moss, Walter G. (1 July 2003). A History of Russia Volume 1: To 1917. Anthem Press. ISBN 978-0-85728-752-6.
- Nemeth, Jozsef (1996). Landmarks in the History of Hungarian Engineering. Budapest, Hungary: Technical University of Budapest. Archived from the original on 25 October 2008.
- Ostowski, Donald (2006). "The Growth of Muscovy, (1462–1533)". In Perrie, Maureen (ed.). The Cambridge History of Russia. Vol. 1. pp. 222–223.
- Pape, Carsten (2016). "Titul Ivana III po datskim istochnikam pozdnego Srednevekov'ya" Титул Ивана III по датским источникам позднего Средневековья [The title of Ivan III according to late-medieval Danish sources]. Studia Slavica et Balcanica Petropolitana (in Russian). 20 (2). St. Petersburg: 65–75. doi:10.21638/11701/spbu19.2016.205.
- Paul, Michael C. (2007). "Secular Power and the Archbishops of Novgorod up to the Muscovite Conquest". Kritika. 8 (2). Long Beach, California: Slavica, Publishers: 131–170. doi:10.1353/kri.2007.0020. S2CID 153403531.
- Payne, Robert; Romanoff, Nikita (2002). Ivan the Terrible. New York City: Cooper Square Press. ISBN 978-0815412298.
- Pipes, Richard (1995). Russia Under the Old Regime (2 ed.). Penguin Publishing Group. ISBN 9780140247688.
- Polovtsov, A. A., ed. (1897). Russkiy biograficheskiy slovar' Русскiй бiографическiй словарь [Russian Biographic Dictionary] (in Russian). Vol. VIII. St. Petersburg: Crown Land Office.
- Oresko, Robert; Gibbs, G. C.; Scott, H. M. (30 January 1997). Royal and Republican Sovereignty in Early Modern Europe - Essays in Memory of Ragnhild Hatton. Cambridge University Press. ISBN 978-0-521-41910-9.
- Riasanovsky, Nicholas V. (29 September 2005). Russian Identities - A Historical Survey. Oxford University Press. ISBN 978-0-19-534814-9.
- Shvidkovskiĭ, Dmitriĭ Olegovich (2007). Russian Architecture and the West. New Haven, Connecticut: Yale University Press. ISBN 978-0300109122.
- Sokolov, Aleksandr Nikolayevich (2002). Potomstvo Ryurika: polnyi perechen' knyazey i dvoryan, potomkov Ryurika - pervogo russkogo knyazya, osnovatelya dinastii Ryurikovichey i russkoy gosudarstvennosi Потомство Рюрика: полный перечень князей и дворян, потомков Рюрика - первого русского князя, основателя династии Рюриковичей и русской государственности [The Offspring of Rurik: a Complete List of Princes and Nobles, the Descendants of Rurik - the First Russian Prince, Founder of the Rurik Dynasty and Russian Statehood] (in Russian) (2 ed.). Nizhny Novgorod: Institute of Economic Development of Nizhny Novgorod.
- Stevens, Carol (13 September 2013). Russia's Wars of Emergence 1460-1730. Routledge. ISBN 978-1-317-89330-1.
- Szendrei, János (1905). "Régi kép Mátyás király oroszországi követségéről" (PDF). Archaeologiai Értesítő (in Hungarian): 137–146.

Regnal titles
Preceded by Vasili II	Grand Prince of Moscow; 1462–1505	Succeeded by Vasili III
