= Vladychny Convent =

Russian Orthodox convent in Serpukhov, Moscow Oblast

Coordinates: 54.8987°N 37.3991°E

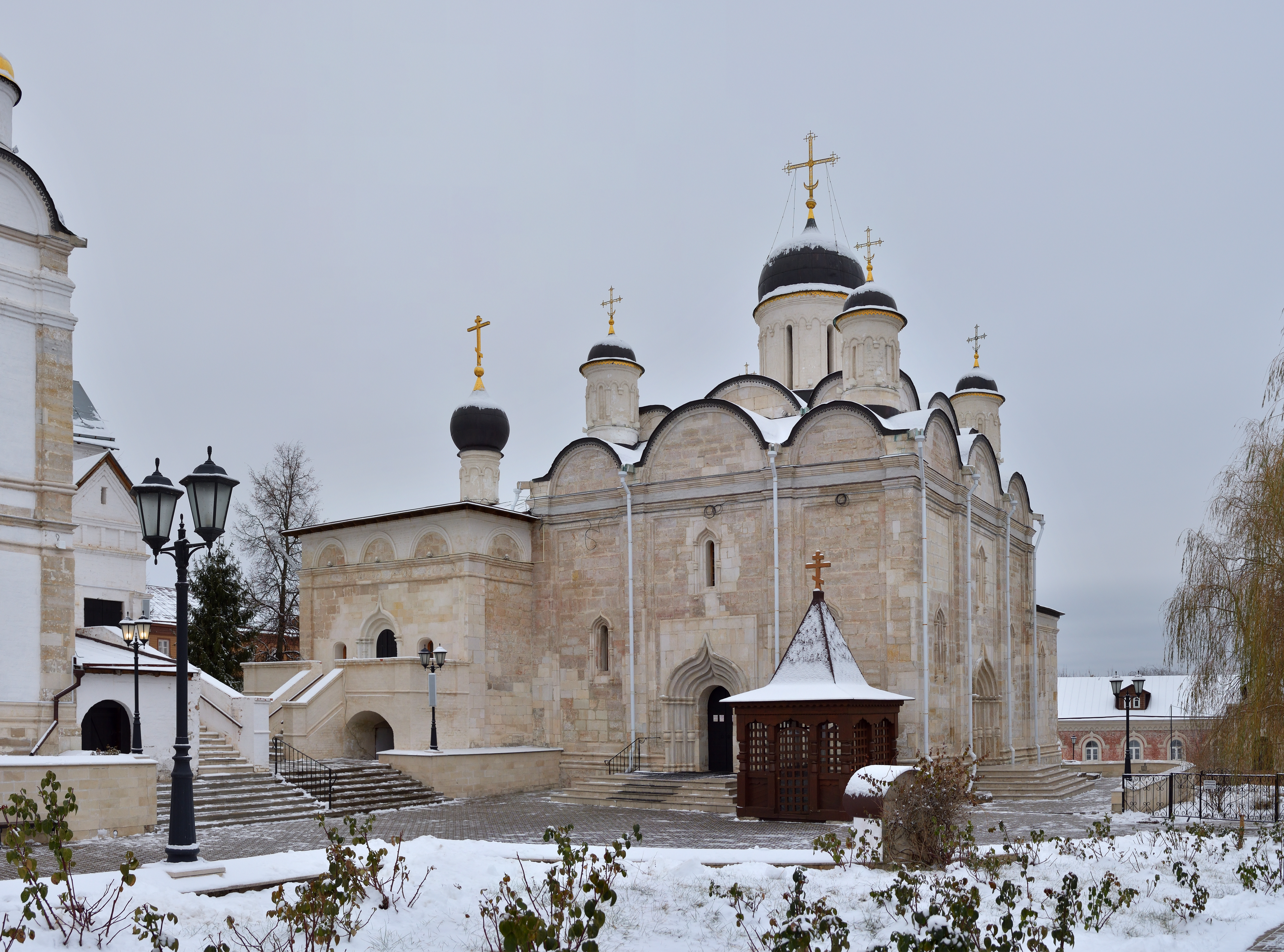
The existing katholikon was built of limestone (rather than of standard brick) at the behest of Boris Godunov

Vladychny Monastery (Введенский Владычный монастырь) is a Russian Orthodox convent in Serpukhov, Moscow Oblast. It is located outside the downtown, near the confluence of the rivers Nara and Oka.

== History ==
The Vladychny Monastery was founded in 1360 by Metropolitan Alexius of Moscow under the auspices of Prince Vladimir the Bold. It contains four churches dating from the 16th and 17th centuries. The katholikon was built under Boris Godunov and dedicated to the feast of the Entry of the Most Holy Theotokos into the Temple. It houses the relics of Saint Varlaam, a 14th-century monk who is considered to be the builder and the first abbot of the Vladychny monastery.

For many years, the monastery was a major landowner and held a notable community of monks. By the end of the 18th century, it had fallen into poverty and the resident monks were few. In 1806, Metropolitan Platon obtained the permission to re-establish this monastic community as a nunnery and in 1806 first nuns came to live there.

The convent reached the pinnacle of its prosperity and wealth under Abbess Mitrophania who, being Baron Rosen's daughter, boasted numerous connections at the imperial court. After ruling the convent for 13 years, she was arrested for faking promissory notes and, after a highly publicized trial, was sentenced to exile in Siberia. Alexander Ostrovsky based his play Wolves and Sheep on his impressions of attending the court proceedings in 1874.

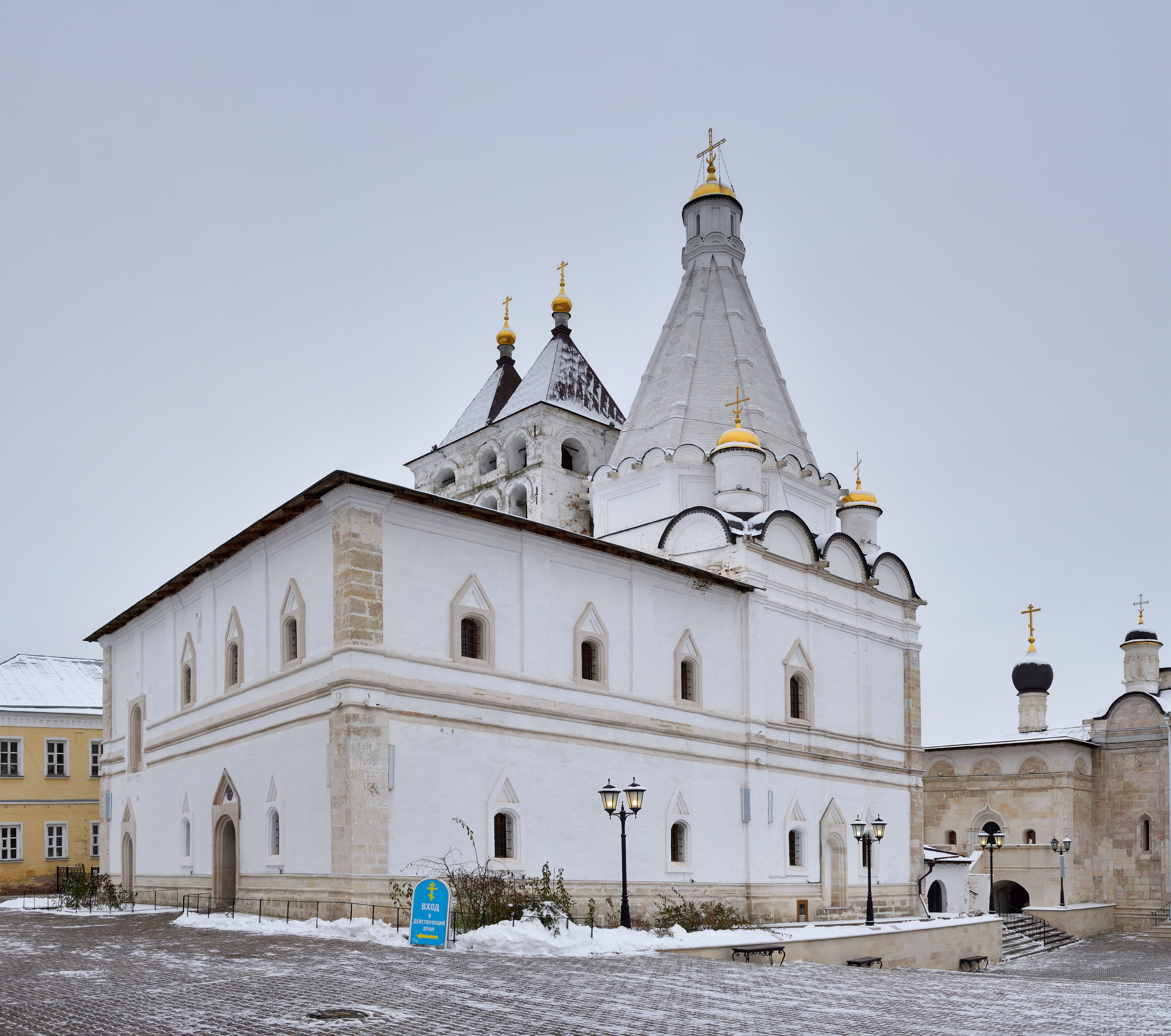
The refectory building with a tented church from 1599

The monastery was confiscated from the church by the Soviet authorities in the 1920s. The premises were given to a test pilot school. In the 1970s, the major buildings (including the cathedral and the rare tent-like church) were restored with a view to reconstructing their presumed medieval (pre-Petrine) appearance.

== Inexhaustible Chalice ==
The Vladychny Monastery is the site of the first appearance of the highly revered icon called “The Inexhaustible Cup.” According to the legend, in 1878, a retired soldier who had suffered from alcoholism for many years had a vision where he saw a starets (elder) who commanded him to go to the Vladychny Convent to find the Icon “The Inexhaustible Cup” (Russian: Неупиваемая Чаша) and to hold a moleben (service of supplication) before it. At first, the nuns did not recognize any icon by that description. Finally, a nun remembered an icon in the passage between the convent and St. George's Church. That icon showed the Infant Christ standing in a communion chalice while behind Him the Mother of God raises her hands in an orans gesture as in the icon called the Virgin of the Sign.

The old soldier is said to have been immediately healed and relieved of his alcoholic obsession. Afterwards, when he saw an icon of St. Varlaam at the convent, the old soldier at once recognized him as the holy elder who had appeared to him in the vision and commanded him to go to the Mother of God for healing from alcoholism. The news of the healing rapidly spread and the convent became a place of pilgrimage for those suffering from alcoholism.

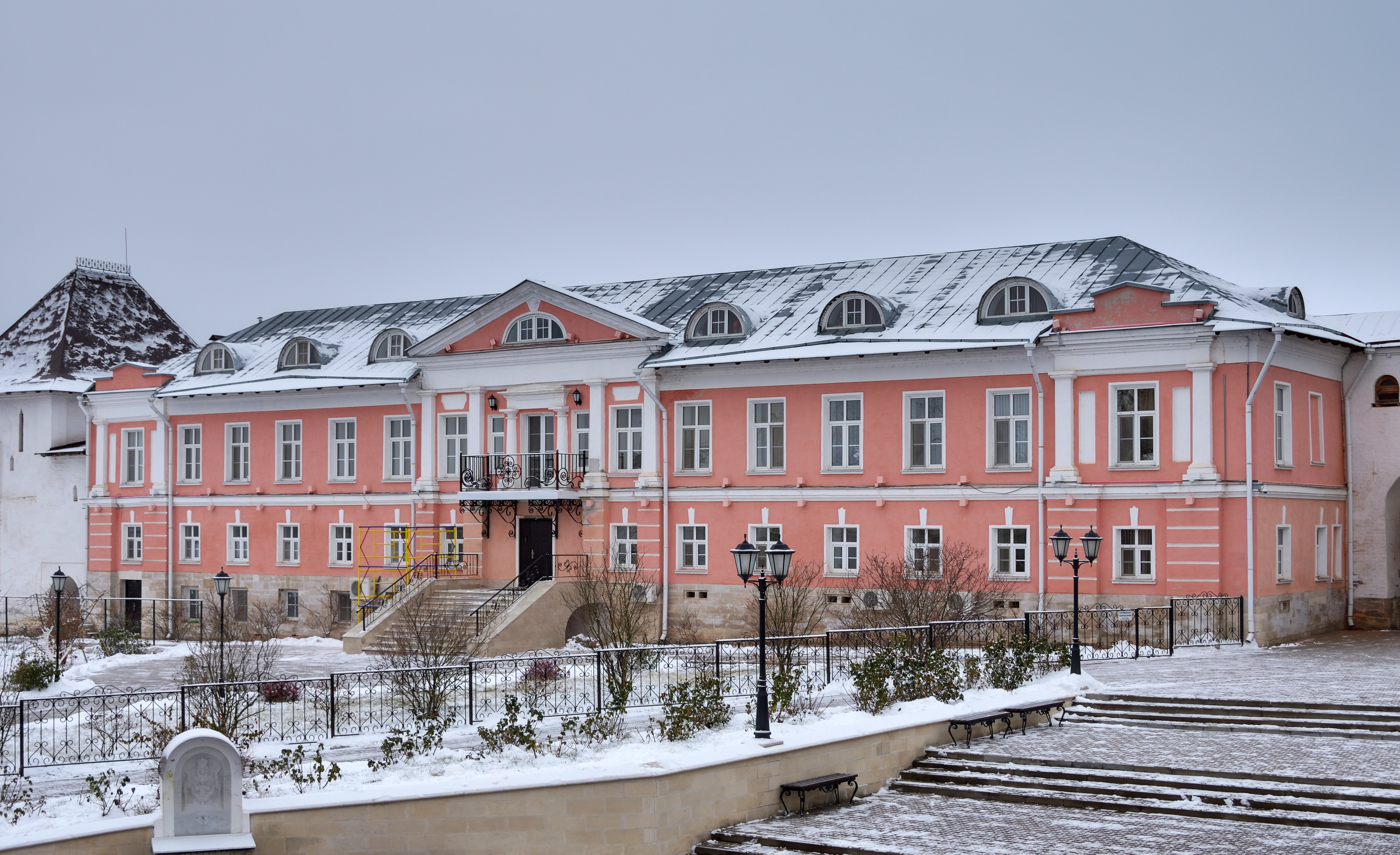
The palace of Abbess Mitrophania

The original icon of the Inexhaustible Cup was preserved for many years in the convent at Vladychny Monastery until it was lost during the Soviet period, along with other relics. In 1992, the iconographer Alexander Sokolov painted a new copy of the icon in the Byzantine style. In 1993, the copy was installed in the Vysotsky Monastery, also in Serpukhov, where it is now venerated as wonder-working, particularly in healing from addiction.

== Reopening ==
The convent was re-opened in 1995. In 1996, a copy of the Inexhaustible Cup icon was enshrined in the monastery. This copy is also reported to be wonder-working. Since August 2000, there have been reports that several of the icons at Vladychny have become myrrh-streaming.
