= Aleksandr Yatsko =

Aleksandr Yatsko may refer to:

- Aleksandr Yatsko (footballer) (born 1978), Russian football player
- Aleksandr Yatsko (actor) (born 1958), Russian theater and film actor
