= Nicetas of Kostroma =

Russian Orthodox abbot, archimandrite and monk

Saint Nicetas of Kostroma

The Venerable Nicetas of Kostroma
- Born: 1365; Rostov
- Died: 1450; Kostroma
- Resting place: Kostroma Cathedral of the Epiphany Monastery of St. Anastasia
- Venerated in: Russian Orthodox Church
- Feast: 28 September; 15 September (O.S.)

Nicetas of Kostroma (Note: Russian: Никита Костромской.) (also known as Nikita of Kostroma, Nicetas of Radonezh, Nicetas of Borov, Nicetas of Serpukhov, Nicetas of Vysotsk; 1365–1450) was a Russian Eastern Orthodox monk, abbot, and archimandrite. He is venerated as a saint in the Russian Orthodox Church.

== Biography ==
Nicetas is believed to have been born in Rostov in 1365; he was baptized with the name John. (Note: Russian: Иоанн.) John was taught to read and write, and expressed a pious dedication to God early on in his life. He began going to the Trinity Lavra of St. Sergius, eventually settling there, helping serve food, carry water and firewood, and bake prosphora bread. At the monastery, he met Sergius of Radonezh, whose disciple he later became. Under Sergius' leadership, he was tonsured as a monk with the new name of Nicetas. (Note: Russian: Никита.) In 1382, he is believed to have traveled to Serpukhov, where he helped with the establishment of the Vysotsky Monastery.

Upon the death of Athanasius the Elder, abbot of the monastery, Nicetas became its head. He lead it from 1387 to 1407, when the region suffered from Tatar and Lithuanian invasion.

After serving at multiple other monasteries, Nicetas settled in Kostroma in 1426, where he founded the Epiphany Monastery of St. Anastasia. He led the monastery for 24 years, until his death in 1450. His relics have been enshrined at the cathedral of the same monastery where he last served.
