= Vysotsky Monastery =

Russian Orthodox monastery

Coordinates: 54°54′6″N 37°25′9″E

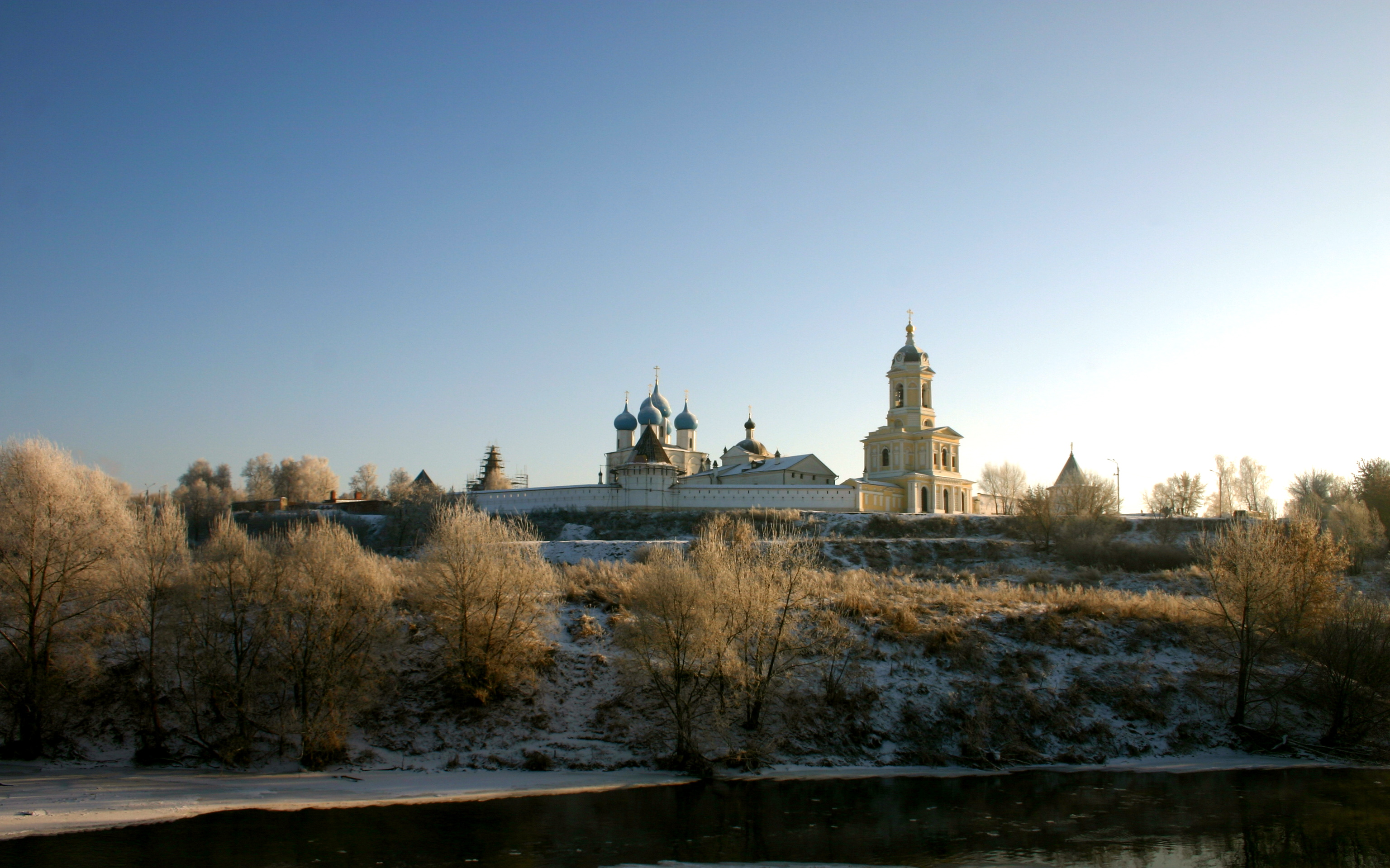
The "High-Placed" Monastery in Serpukhov

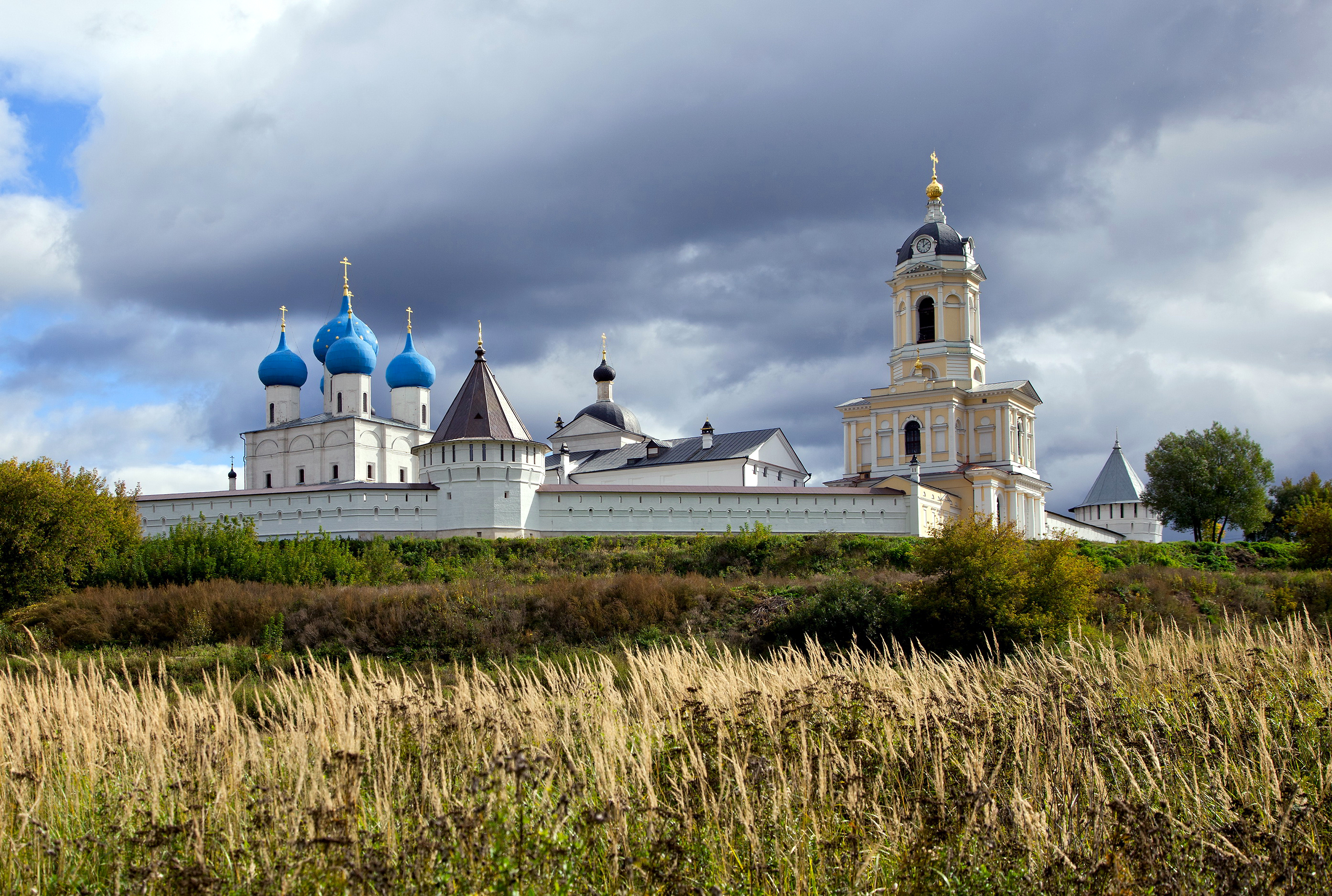
The monastery in 2011.

Vysotsky Monastery (Russian: Высоцкий монастырь) is a walled Russian Orthodox monastery commanding the high left bank of the Nara River in Serpukhov, about 2 km from its confluence with the Oka. Its name stems from the Russian word for "heights".

The monastery was founded in the 1370s by Vladimir the Bold and long served as a border fortress defending the southern approaches to Moscow from the Tatars. The first hegumen, Afanasy the Elder, was a disciple of St. Sergius of Radonezh, whose successor, St. Nikon of Radonezh, is believed to have been tonsured a monk in this monastery.

After the Russo–Crimean War (1571), which saw the monastery reduced to ashes, it was restored on a grander scale. The five-domed Cathedral of the Conception dates from that building campaign, financed by Ivan the Terrible. The cathedral was almost certainly preceded by a medieval limestone church of which little is known.

In the mid-17th century the monastery was fortified with stone walls and four corner towers. It rivalled the Vladychny Monastery as the most important shrine of Serpukhov and welcomed rich patrons wishing to be buried within the monastery walls. Among those buried there are Gavrila Golovkin, the Chancellor of Peter the Great, and Fyodor Soimonov, the Governor of Siberia. The Neoclassical belfry was completed in the 1840s.

The monastery celebrated its 500th anniversary with the construction of the All Saints church, designed by Roman Klein in a fashionable Neo-Byzantine style. The church was destroyed after the Russian Revolution, when the monastery was given over to the Latvian Riflemen to be used as barracks. By the end of the Soviet period the monastery had lost most of its walls and was very dilapidated.

Restoration work on one of the greatest monasteries of the Moscow region started immediately after its return to the Russian Orthodox Church in 1991. Repairs were made in the Church of the Nativity of the Theotokos, dating from the 17th century and containing an icon screen and royal doors from the 16th century. Reconstruction of the missing sections of the wall is in prospect.

The modern monastery derives its prosperity from the venerated copy of the icon of the Inexhaustible Chalice, which attracts hundreds of pilgrims from all over Russia and abroad. The icon was brought to the monastery from the Vladychny Convent (also in Serpukhov) and is said to be particularly effective in the treatment of alcoholism.
