= Yatsko =

Slavic family name

Yatsko (in international transcription:[jɑːc'ko]; in English transcription: [jɑːts'ko]; Cyrillic spelling: Яцко) is a Slavic surname that can be found in Poland, Russia, Belarus, Ukraine, the United States, Moldova and some other countries. In English speaking countries it is pronounced with the first syllable stressed [ˈjɑːtskoʊ] and has other less common variants of spelling: 'Iatsko', 'Jaczko'. The surname is rather rare and hasn't been listed among the most common surnames in the above-mentioned countries.

== Etymology ==
Russian lexicographer Vladimir Dal saw 'Яцко' as specific to the dialect of Yaroslav region. According to Dal, it originates from the word 'ятской' ['jɑːtskoi]. He gave the following definition of 'ятской': "a pie eaten with honey; biscuit with butter and eggs cooked in a pot or jar".

A. Superanskaya, a contemporary onomastician, believes that 'Яцко' is a diminutive of the first name Yan/Jan ['jɑːn], which is widespread in Poland and Belarus, and is equivalent to English 'John'. Many Yatskos living in Russia came from Belarus. Alternatively, the surname may have a connection with the Polish given name, Jacek (pronounced ['jɑtsek]), which comes from the Greek Hyakinthos (=ruler), and is equivalent to the English Hyacinth(e).

The surname Yatsko has never been registered in the lists of Russian or Polish gentry. It may be of peasant origin. Until the abolition of serfdom, peasants did not have surnames and would sometimes adopt given names as surnames.

== Notable people ==
In English-speaking countries, the surname Яцко is usually transliterated from Cyrillic as Yatsko or Iatsko. It is spelled 'Jacko' in the Czech Republic, Slovakia, and Poland. It may appear as 'Jaczko' in Hungary and as 'Jatzko' in Germany.

=== Yatsko ===
- Aleksandr Yatsko (born 1978), Russian footballer
- Aleksandr Yatsko (actor) (born 1958), Russian actor
- Igor Yatsko (born 1964), Russian actor
- Ivan Yatsko (1880–unknown), Russian Imperial Army officer
- Thomas Yatsko, American cinematographer and director
- Viatcheslav Yatsko, a Russian expert in computational linguistics

=== Jacko ===
- Patrik Jacko (born 1992), Slovak footballer

=== Jaczko ===
- Gregory Jaczko (born 1970), chairman of the U.S. Nuclear Regulatory Commission
