= Aleksandr Yatsko (actor) =

Russian film and theater actor and director

Aleksandr Yatsko HAR
- Александр Яцко
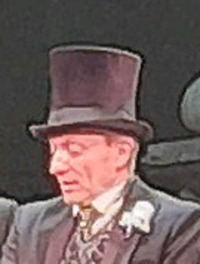
- Yatsko in 2022
- Born: Aleksandr Vladimirovich Yatsko; 13 June 1958 (age 68); Minsk, BSSR, USSR
- Citizenship: Soviet Union (until 1991); Russia
- Occupation: Actor
- Years active: 1985 — present
- Spouse: Yelena Valyushkina (divorce)
- Children: 2

Aleksandr Vladimirovich Yatsko (Russian: Алекса́ндр Влади́мирович Яцко́; born 13 June 1958) is a Soviet and Russian theater and film actor, director, Honored Artist of Russia (2005).

== Biography ==
Yatsko was born on 13 June 1958 in Minsk, Byelorussian SSR, Soviet Union (now Belarus).

In 1980 he graduated from the architectural faculty of the Belarusian National Technical University. In 1985 he graduated from Moscow Art Theater School.

From 1985 to 1993 worked in the Taganka Theater, where he played in the plays based on the works of Moliere, Maxim Gorky, Mikhail Bulgakov. Since 1993 actor of the Mossovet Theater).

From January to June 2016, he led the program Disclosing Mystical Secrets on TV channel Moscow Trust.

== Career ==
=== Theater ===
- Dog Waltz as Karl
- Ruy Blas as Don César de Bazan, comte de Garofa
- Suddenly Last Summer as Doctor
- Mother Courage and Her Children as regimental priest
- The Seagull as doctor
- Cyrano de Bergerac as Comte Antoine de Guiche
- The Government Inspector as Mayor
- Jesus Christ Superstar as Pontius Pilate
- Les Liaisons dangereuses as Valmont
- Woe from Wit as Pavel Afanasyevich Famusov
- Wolves and Sheep as Berkutov

=== Cinema ===
- The Secret Walk (1985) as Max von Görlitz, Wehrmacht Lieutenant
- The Russia House (1990) as Russian writer
- The Ice Runner (1993) as Dmitry
- Sacred Cargo (1995) as Oleg
- The Peacemaker as Russian corporal
- Country of the Deaf (1998) as The Albino
- House of Fools (2002) as episode
- Poor Nastya (2003) as Prince Aleksandr Repnin
- Young Wolfhound (2007) as Tirgei
- Spiral (2014) as Boris
- Londongrad (2015) as Kiril Savenko
- Kitchen (2015) as Anton Vladimirovich
- To the Lake (2022) as Magus
- Aeterna (2022) as Count Larak, Chief Advisor to the Royal House
- Chaliapin (2023) as Mikhail Vrubel
- Rise of the Empire (2026) as Ivan Mazepa

== Personal life ==
Was married to actress Yelena Valyushkina (Formula of Love). They have two children: son Vasily (1997) and daughter Maria (2002).
