= Rise of the Empire (film) =

- Directed by: Andrei Kravchuk
- Written by: AndreI Zolotarev
- Produced by: Leonid Vereshchagin (ru); Anton Zlatopolsky (ru); Nikita Mikhalkov
- Starring: Aleksandr Gorbatov (ru); Miloš Biković; Yulia Peresild; Ksenia Utekhina; Aleksei Guskov
- Cinematography: Morad Abdel-Fattakh
- Edited by: Aleksandr Koshelev; Yulia Polyakova
- Music by: Kuzma Bodrov
- Production companies: Studio TriTe; Russia-1; Central Partnership Productions; Rosneft; Cinema Fund
- Distributed by: Central Partnership
- Release dates: October 22, 2026 (Moscow); October 29, 2026 (Russia)
- Running time: 139 minutes
- Country: Russia
- Languages: Russian; Swedish
- Budget: ₽2.120 billion
- Box office: ₽436 million

Rise of the Empire (Russian: Рождение империи) is a 2026 Russian historical drama film directed by Andrei Kravchuk about Peter the Great, telling about the period of large-scale changes that took place in the country after the ruler's return from Europe, which laid the foundation for the emergence of the Russian Empire. It stars Aleksandr Gorbatov, Miloš Biković, Yulia Peresild, Ksenia Utekhina, and Aleksei Guskov. The film's cinematographer was Morad Abdel-Fattakh. The soundtrack for the film was written by Kuzma Bodrov.

This film was theatrically released on October 29, 2026.

== Plot ==
The events of the film begin following Peter I’s return to Russia in 1698, after his "Grand Embassy" across Europe. The Tsar intends to implement reforms aimed at developing the military, strengthening the state, and expanding international ties. However, his decisions meet with resistance from a segment of the boyar class, who remain committed to the traditional order of governance.

The drive to secure the Tsardom of Russia access to the Baltic Sea leads to a confrontation with the Swedish Empire. Early in the Great Northern War, the Tsar faces a series of setbacks—most notably the defeat of Russian forces at the Battle of Narva in 1700. This victory for the Swedish army, commanded by Charles XII, compels Peter I to rethink his approach to the war.

A significant portion of the narrative focuses on Peter I’s relationships with his close associates, primarily Alexander Menshikov and Boris Sheremetev. Other plot threads explore Peter’s involvement with Anna Mons and Marta Skavronskaya—the latter of whom would eventually become his wife and Empress of Russia. The narrative concludes with the Battle of Poltava in 1709.

The victory at Poltava marked an important stage in strengthening Russia’s international standing, though the official proclamation of the empire occurred later. The Great Northern War concluded with the signing of the Treaty of Nystad in 1721. Following this, Peter I assumed the title of Emperor, and the Tsardom of Russia became known as the Russian Empire.

== Cast ==
- Aleksandr Gorbatov as Peter the Great, the Russian tsar, the first emperor of Russia.
- Miloš Biković as Alexander Danilovich Menshikov, Peter I's closest associate.
- Yulia Peresild as Anna Mons, Peter I's lover.
- Ksenia Utekhina as Marta Skavronskaya, the future Catherine I of Russia.
- Aleksei Guskov as Boris Sheremetev, a Russian military commander.
- Vitaly Khaev as Fyodor Romodanovsky, a statesman.
- Nikolay Kozak as Carl Ewald von Rönne (General Renne)
- Viktor Dobronravov as Semyon, a soldier
- Sergey Shakurov as Patriarch Adrian of Moscow
- Aleksandr Yatsenko as Nikita Demidov
- Aleksandr Yatsko as Ivan Mazepa
- Yakov Tikhomirov as Egor Ivanovich Pashkov (governor), an orderly to Peter I
- Yevgeny Berezovsky as Jacob Bruce
- Mathe Kabe as Charles XII of Sweden
- Sofia Doniants as Maria Aurora von Königsmarck
- Jerrod Weston as Adam Ludwig Lewenhaupt

Other cast

- Yakov Tikhomirov as Peter I’s orderly
- Igor Dmitriev as a soldier in Alexander Menshikov’s army
- Ivan Kirenkov as Boris Sheremetev's orderly
- Sergey Shkoda as Anisim, an orderly
- Aleksandr Brykin as Mikita Afanasyev, Nikita Demidov’s assistant
- Vladimir Maizinger as Mikhail Lykov, a boyar
- Dmitry Krasyuk as Apraksin, a boyar
- Marina Antonova as Marfa Kobylina, a boyar woman
- Yevgeny Schwartz as Frederick IV of Denmark
- Marcel Kowalewski as August I
- Dirk Simpson as Carl Gustav Rehnskiöld
- Valentin Antsiferov as Misha Kobylin
- Vladislav Vetrov as Misha Kobylin’s father
- Sergei Garmash as Romodanovsky

== Production ==
=== Development ===
The first reports regarding the development of the film emerged in 2021. Initially, Aleksey Nuzhnyy was attached as director, with Aleksey Dubinin serving as executive producer. The plan was to shoot approximately 70% of the material in the Belgorod Oblast, with the remaining sequences filmed in Saint Petersburg and locations outside of Russia. Areas within the Korochansky, Belgorodsky, and Shebekinsky districts were considered for the historical scenes.

Subsequently, the production concept was revised. Andrei Kravchuk took over as director; his previous work includes the historical films Viking (2016 film), Union of Salvation (2019 film), Peter I: The Last Tsar and the First Emperor (2022 film), and The Empresses (2023 film). In December 2023, the updated project was presented to the expert council of the Cinema Foundation (Fond Kino). By that time, storyboards and preliminary visualizations for the scenes had been prepared, and the casting process was in its final stages.

=== Writing ===
The screenplay was written by Andrei Zolotarev. According to Andrei Kravchuk, once he joined the project, he and Zolotarev drafted an entirely new script, replacing the original version. The narrative focuses on the period of transformation in Russia that began following Peter I’s return from the "Grand Embassy." The plot weaves together the monarch’s political decisions, military campaigns, relationships with his inner circle, and personal life. Particular emphasis is placed on the Great Northern War—specifically the interval between the Russian army’s defeat at Narva and its victory at Poltava.

As envisioned by the creators, the film is not a linear biography of Peter I. Beyond the Russian Tsar, the narrative gives significant weight to his closest associates and his military adversaries. Key characters include Charles XII, Swedish Field Marshal Carl Gustav Rehnskiöld, Alexander Menshikov, and Boris Sheremetev. The screenplay includes the formation of an anti-Swedish alliance, its initial setbacks, a shift in Peter I’s military strategy, and the defection of Hetman Ivan Mazepa to the Swedish side. The final part of the narrative focuses on the Battle of Poltava, to which a significant portion of screen time was to be devoted.

=== Casting ===
During the initial stages of the project’s development, the role of Peter I was intended for Miloš Biković. Director Aleksey Nuzhnyy noted that the search for an actor for the part lasted over a year. Following a shift in the director’s vision, the role went to Aleksandr Gorbatov, while Biković was cast as Alexander Menshikov—one of the monarch’s closest associates.

Yulia Peresild was cast as Anna Mons, Aleksei Guskov as Boris Sheremetev, and Ksenia Utekhina as Marta Skavronskaya (the future Catherine I). Vitaly Khaev was given the role of Fyodor Romodanovsky. The cast also includes Viktor Dobronravov, Sergey Shakurov, Aleksandr Yatsenko, and Aleksandr Yatsko.

=== Filming ===
Principal photography began in the summer of 2024. Filming took place in Moscow, Saint Petersburg, and the Leningrad Oblast and Tula Oblast regions. The Aleksinsky and Zaoksky districts of the Tula region were selected for the outdoor battle sequences, including scenes depicting the Battle of Poltava and other military engagements from the early 18th century.

Local stunt performers, extras, and students and graduates from specialized arts institutions took part in the production of these battle sequences. The regional government and the regional film commission provided organizational support to the film crew.

To recreate the historical setting in the Tula Oblast, the production team constructed sets including living quarters (barracks), military tents, chapels, and earthen dugouts. The sites also featured burned-down villages, field fortifications, and the command post of Peter I—structures used for staging episodes related to the military campaigns of the early 18th century.

Sergey Agin served as the production designer, while Ekaterina Shapkays was the costume designer. Morad Abdel Fattah served as the director of photography.

The Battle of Poltava holds a central place in the production; it was filmed on location using earthen fortifications and reconstructed military camps.

Filming in the Tula Oblast concluded by November 2024.

== Release ==
=== Marketing ===
The first teaser trailer for Rise of the Empire was unveiled on February 10, 2026.

=== Theatrical ===
On October 22, 2026, in a conversation with journalist Pavel Zarubin, Vladimir Putin mentioned that he had watched Rise of the Empire and enjoyed it. The President of the Russian Federation described the film as a "true work of art," praised the acting, and noted that the movie allows the audience to immerse themselves in a historical era. Putin also thanked the actors, the director, and the creative team for their work, and proposed that the film be screened free of charge for schoolchildren, students, and pensioners.

On October 22, 2026, the film premiered at the KARO 11 October cinema in Moscow, and it was theatrically released in the Russian Federation on October 29, by the company Central Partnership.

== Reception ==
=== Box office ===
Over its opening weekend (October 29 – November 1, 2026), the film topped the box office in Russia and the Commonwealth of Independent States, grossing an estimated 236.3 million rubles, according to preliminary, unofficial figures.
