= Inexhaustible Chalice =

Religious icon

- Inexaustible Cup
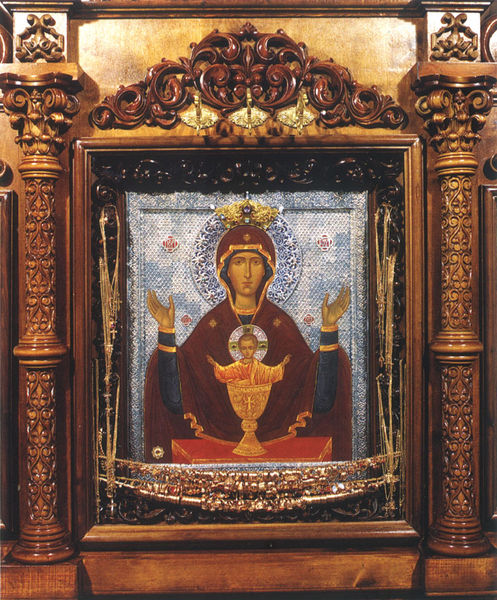
- Year: 1878
- Location: Vysotsky Monastery, Russia

Inexhaustible Chalice (Russian: Неупиваемая чаша Neupivayemaya chasha; also known in English as Inexhaustible Cup or Non-intoxicating Chalice) is a wonderworking icon of the Mother of God (Θεοτόκος (Theotokos) or Богородица (Bogoroditsa)) which revealed itself in Serpukhov, Russia in 1878. The icon is venerated in the Russian Orthodox Church and has become known for healing those who suffer from alcoholism, drug abuse and other forms of addiction.

== The Icon ==
The icon of the "Inexhaustible Chalice" depicts the Theotokos with hands raised in the orans position, similar to icons of Our Lady of the Sign. The Christ Child is shown standing in a chalice with both hands raised in blessing.

The icon is a variant of the icon of "Our Lady of Nicea", also known as “Your Womb Becomes the Holy Table.” The difference between the two is that the Nicean icon shows the Theotokos with Her head inclined to one side, sometimes with eyes downcast, whereas She is depicted in the "Inexhaustible Chalice" icon with Her head straight and looking at the viewer.

== Appearance of the Icon ==
In 1878, a peasant of the Tula province—a retired soldier who had a passion for alcohol for many years— saw a certain elder in a vision who commanded him to go to the Vladychny Convent in Serpukhov, to find the Icon “The Inexhaustible Cup” and to hold a molieben before it. The old, penniless soldier, exhausted by his hard drinking, had absolutely no strength to go to Serpukhov. Soon the holy elder appeared twice more and the poor elderly soldier literally crawled to the convent on all fours. On the very first night of his ascetic journey the man suddenly felt that his legs began to obey him again.

Reaching the convent, he reportedly put its nuns to confusion, as they knew nothing of an icon with this name. Then a nun recalled an icon that hung in the convent passageway from the St. George Church, which portrayed a chalice. Those present were surprised when they saw the inscription “The Inexhaustible Cup” on the back of the icon. According to the account, when the man came up to the shrine of St. Varlaam, he recognized in him the elder who had appeared to him in a vision and instructed him to go to the Mother of God seeking healing from alcoholism. Reports of this event spread to many towns and villages; people described as struggling with alcoholism came to venerate the icon known as “The Inexhaustible Chalice” and, according to these reports, gave up drinking. The account further states that peace and quiet began to reign in their homes, attributed to prayers to the Protectress of mankind.

After the October Revolution, the original "Inexhaustible Chalice" icon was moved to St. Nicholas Cathedral. During the years 1919-1928 eight copies were painted. After the cathedral was closed in 1929, most of its icons were burned and the fate of the wonder-working icon and the eight copies is unknown.

== Veneration of the Icon following Collapse of Communism ==
In 1991, the men's Vysotsky Monastery in Serpukhov, founded in 1374 by St. Sergius of Radonezh, was reopened under the direction of Archimandrite Joseph (Balabanov, now Bishop of Birobidzhan and Kuldursk). In 1992, the iconographer Alexander Sokolov painted a new copy of the icon in the Byzantine style. It had been determined by Archimandrite Joseph that the prototype icon was of Byzantine style, based on a description written by the Russian Orthodox priest and martyr, Jacob Ivanovich Brilliantov. In 1993 it was installed in the Vysotsky Monastery, where it is now venerated as wonder-working, particularly in healing from addiction. This icon has become renowned throughout all of Russia and throughout the Orthodox world. The Vysotsky Monastery has since become the major shrine of the icon of the "Inexhaustible Chalice".

In the 1995, the women's Vladychny Convent, site of the original manifestation of the "Inexhaustible Cup", was reopened. In 1996, a copy, painted in the "academic" style based on a 1912 drawing, was enshrined. This icon too has become miraculous, streaming myrrh and witnesses seeing the eyes of the Theotokos moving.

In an interview, Abbess Alexia of the Vladychny Convent stated an icon of the "Inexhaustible Chalice", presumed to be the miraculous original of 1878, had been found in a private art collection. It is uncertain whether the icon can be redeemed.

The icon has been painted in many styles and several copies throughout Russia are regarded as miraculous.

In 1997, in recognition of its veneration, its commemoration was entered into the official liturgical calendar of the Russian Orthodox Church with the blessing of the late Patriarch Alexy II. The feast day is listed as May 5 O.S./May 18 N.S., the date of the repose of St. Varlaam. The Vladychny Convent continues to celebrate the feast day of the "Inexhaustible Chalice" on November 27 O.S./ December 10 N.S., the feast day of Our Lady of the Sign.

An akathist and molieben to the "Inexhaustible Chalice" have been composed in Russian and English.

People suffering from alcoholism, drug addiction, and other dependencies continue to appeal to God for help and healing through the icon of the Inexhaustible Chalice.

== The Icon in Recovery Programs ==
After the icon was glorified as being miraculous in 1878, the Alexander Nevsky Cathedral in Serpakhov organized the "St. Alexander Nevsky Brotherhood of Sobriety."

Since the early 1990s, sixty drug rehabilitation centers in Russia are run by the Russian Orthodox Church.

The Pokrov-Tervenichesky convent has a skete dedicated to the "Inexhaustible Chalice", where men and women suffering from addictions go through a recovery program.

The Fellowship of the Inexhaustible Cup was formed "to provide and establish a network of intercessory prayer and support among its members in order to combat the many destructive forces of addictions."
