= Serpukhov =

City in Moscow Oblast, Russia

Serpukhov Серпухов
- City
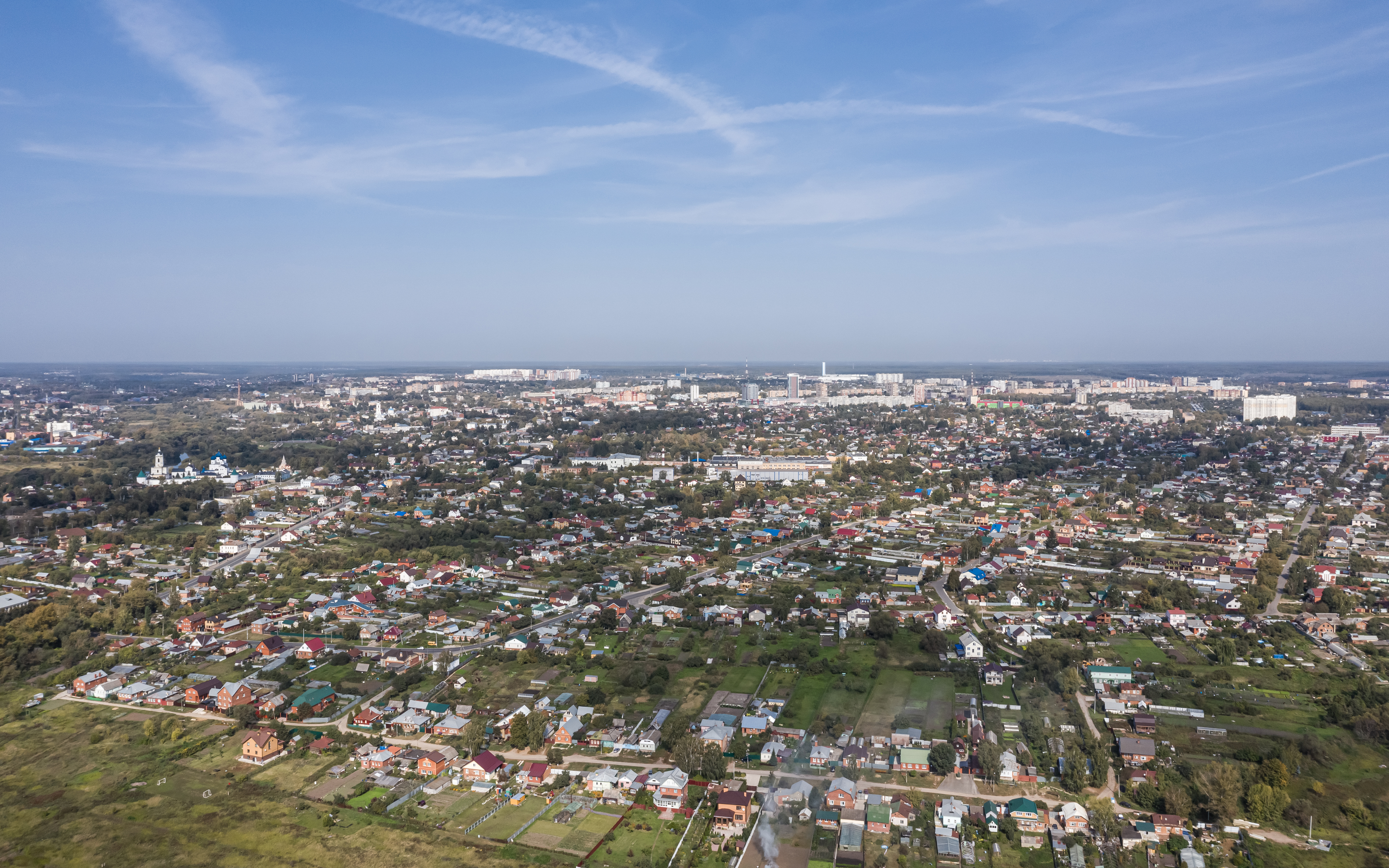
- Aerial view of Serpukhov

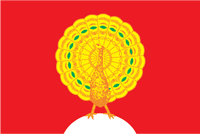
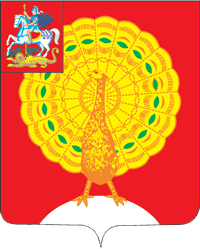
- Flag Coat of arms
- Interactive map of Serpukhov
- Location of Serpukhov Serpukhov (Moscow Oblast)
- Coordinates: 54°55′N 37°24′E
- Country: Russia
- Federal subject: Moscow Oblast
- Founded: 1339
- City status since: 1374

Government
  - Head: Nikitenko Sergey Nikolaevich

Area
  - Total: 37.516 km^{2} (14.485 sq mi)
- Elevation: 140 m (460 ft)

Population (2010 Census)
  - Total: 127,041
  - Estimate (2025): 134,360 (+5.8%)
  - Rank: 129th in 2010
  - Density: 3,386.3/km^{2} (8,770.5/sq mi)

Administrative status
  - Subordinated to: Serpukhov City Under Oblast Jurisdiction
  - Capital of: Serpukhovsky District, Serpukhov City Under Oblast Jurisdiction

Municipal status
  - Urban okrug: Serpukhov Urban Okrug
  - Capital of: Serpukhov Urban Okrug, Serpukhovsky Municipal District
- Time zone: UTC+3 (MSK)
- Postal code: 142200
- Dialing code: +7 4967
- OKTMO ID: 46770000001
- Website: serpuhov.ru

Serpukhov (Russian: Серпухов, IPA: [ˈsʲerpʊxəf]) is a city in Moscow Oblast, Russia, located at the confluence of the Oka and the Nara Rivers, 99 km (62 miles) south from Moscow and 72 km (45 miles) from Moscow Ring Road on the Moscow—Simferopol highway. The Moscow—Tula railway passes through Serpukhov.

Serpukhov is at the centre of the Serpukhov Urban District which in turn lies at the heart of the Serpukhov metropolitan area with a population of more than 260,000 inhabitants.

In the 14th and early 15th centuries, Serpukhov was the capital of the principality. It was allocated to an independent administrative and economic unit with direct subordination to the executive committee of the regional council on September 14, 1939. Now a city of regional subordination, it is part of the municipality of the city district of Serpukhov.

In the modern era, Serpukhov became a local industrial center with textile, mechanical engineering, furniture, and paper-producing industries. The SeAZ factory produced the Lada Oka microcar since the 1980s. The Prioksko-Terrasny Nature Reserve sprawls within 12 km (7.5 miles) from the city. By a resolution of the Moscow Regional Duma of April 28, 2016, the city was awarded the honorary title "The Inhabited Point of Military Valor".

== Geography ==
Serpukhov is located in the southern part of the Moscow Oblast. Two regional centres, Tula and Kaluga, are located at approximately the same distance (about 80 km or 50 miles) from Serpukhov. The city is located on the border of 3 regions (Moscow Oblast, Tula Oblast and Kaluga Oblast).

There were two large landfills in the city. The landfill "Syanovo-1" was closed after a major fire in 2017. The landfill "Lesnaya" was closed in 2021. It was the last landfill in the Moscow Oblast.

=== Climate ===
The climate is moderately continental. Conditions are determined by the impact of the transfer of air masses of western and south-western cyclones, the removal of Arctic air from the north and the transformation of air masses of different origins. The consequence of exposure to air masses from the Atlantic Ocean is the probability of winter thaws and wet cool periods in the summer. The influence of arctic cold masses affects in the form of severe cold snaps in the winter months and in the form of "return of colds" in the spring-summer period, in which the temperature drops down to frosts on the soil.

The coldest month of the year is January: The average temperature is 8.6 °C (47.5 °F). The warmest month is July with an average temperature of 18.5 °C (65.3 °F). Absolute maximum temperature is recorded on August 6, 2010: 39.4 °C (102.9 °F). Days with frosts are recorded even in summer, except July and August. The average duration of a warm period is above 0 °C (32 °F), with an average daily temperature above 216 days per year. The growing season of plants is 180 days.

During the year, the southwest quarter winds prevail – south, southwest and west, the recurrence of which is 15%, 19% and 17%, respectively, and a total of 51%. The average annual wind speed is 3.0 m/s (6.7 mph; 5.8 kn). The average monthly wind speed is observed in winter, reaching a magnitude of 3.3 m/s (7.4 mph; 6.4 kn), the minimum in summer – 2.5–2.6 m/s (5.6–5.8 mph; 4.9–5.1 kn). In winter, the largest forces are the south-east and northwest winds (3.6 m/s [8.1 mph; 7.0 kn]), in the summer – northern and north westerly (3.1–2.8 metres per second [6.9–6.3 mph; 6.0–5.4 kn]). Wind speed, the recurrence of which is 5% - 6 m/s.

Precipitation is mainly determined by cyclonic activity. Precipitation associated with local circulation, even in summer, is a smaller proportion. The average long-term rainfall is 580–590 mm (23–23 inches). During the warm period falls the main (up to 70%) - the amount of precipitation.

The height of snow cover in open spaces is on average 38 cm. In lowered and forested places the height of snow cover is much higher than specified, and it comes off later. The highest height of the snow cover reaches in March. The timing of the formation of a stable snow cover, as well as the timing of its appearance and convergence, vary greatly from year to year depending on the nature of the weather.

== Etymology ==
The city in 1336 is referred to as Serpokhov, only from the 16th century entered into use the modern form of Serpukhov. There is still no clear explanation of the origin of Serpukhov's place-by-point. There are several variants of the origin of the name, none of which, however, is generally accepted: - from the hypothetical name "Serpoch" (derived from "Serp") with suffix -; - from the name of the River Serpeiki; - from the sickle plant; - from the fact that the River Serpeika sickly skirted the Cathedral (Red) mountain; - from the fact that sickles were forged in the vicinity of the city; - from the canonical name Serapion; - different versions of the Finno-Ugric origin and other versions.

== History ==
Serpukhov was established in 1339 to protect the southern approaches to Moscow. Two years later it was made a seat of the powerful princedom ruled by a cousin and close associate of Dmitry Donskoy, Vladimir the Bold. Town status was granted to it in 1374. The princedom continued until 1456, when the last prince escaped to Lithuania. The town frequently fell prey to the hordes of Tokhtamysh, Crimean Tatars, and other steppe conquerors. It was necessary to protect it with a stone citadel, or kremlin, which was completed by 1556 as part of the Great Abatis Belt.

Located on the Oka frontiers and serving as a fortress during the long struggle with the Mongol-Tatar and Lithuanian-Polish conquerors, Serpukhov, for a long time, remained a reliable outpost of the Moscow Principality. The Serpukhov principality, led by Prince Vladimir Brave, participated in the Battle of Kulikov. It was here that Tsar Ivan IV once conducted a large look at his military forces, here stood the camp of Boris Godunov with "rat people", in Serpukhov collected regiments "for the enemy of his Crimean tsar" Vasily Shuisky. One of the strongholds was the city for the peasant army of Ivan Bolotnikov.

In the mid-16th century Serpukhov maintained the role of an important strategic, administrative and economic center, experienced a revival in crafts and trade. The city consisted of three parts: the Kremlin, the posada and the suburb. Historically, Serpukhov's urban districts were formed from monastic suburbs and factory huts, and have been merged into a single whole already now.

=== Medieval period ===
There is no written evidence of Serpukhov's existence in the Domangol era. However, as a result of archaeological research of Serpukhovsky fortification, conducted in 1926-1927 by A.N. Voronkov, numerous remains of ceramics, glass, iron products of the 10th and 13th centuries were found. On the site of the fortification between the rivers Nara and Serpeika at the mouth of the last in the 14th century, there was already a city.

The first mention of Serpukhov in written sources is the spiritual letter of Ivan Kalita. In the will of the Moscow prince, the city is presented as one of his possessions. The text of the document exists in two versions with different dating. There are several opinions about the date of the will:

According to L. V. Cherepnin, both copies of the spiritual lettering were drawn up before Ivan Kalita's fourth trip to Orda in 1339. According to A. A. Simin, the document was created earlier than 1331 - either in 1327 or in 1328. A. V. Kuchkin believes that one copy of the will was made in 1336 (during the third trip of the prince to Orda), and the other - after this event. The official date from which the age of the city is counted is 1339, according to the first version.

According to spiritual literacy, the third son of Ivan Kalita Andrei Ivanovich inherited part of the land of the Moscow Principality, including Serpukhov, which became the center of the parish, and in the future - the basis of the new specific principality. In the middle of the 14th century, an epidemic of the plague, known as the "Black Death", swept across Europe. Prince Andrew fell to one of her victims in 1353. The deal is inherited by Prince Vladimir Andreevich. During the age of the prince's possessions are run by influential boyars. At this time in the history of the city is a significant event - Moscow Metropolitan Alexis in 1360 on the right bank of Nara founded the Monastery of The Lord. In 1367, in order to settle relations between Vladimir and his cousin Dmitry signed a contract, which confirms the subordination of the first second, as well as the right of Vladimir Andreevich to his fate and duties in relation to the Moscow prince. Soon Vladimir begins to pay considerable attention to the development of his possessions. Since the 1370s, Serpukhov has been building a period of active construction. So in 1374, according to the chronicles on the Red (Cathedral) mountain begins the construction of a wooden kremlin, the city appointed the viceroy of the prince - Yakov Yuryevich Novosylets, established benefits to attract traders and artisans. In the same year, on the site of the Domongolian Slavic settlement of the High on the left bank of Nara, south of the Red Mountain, Prince Vladimir Andreevich founded a monastery named Vysotsky. The laying and consecration of the monastery was carried out by Sergiy Radonezki. Serpukhov's military, political and economic importance is growing, around which a full-fledged principality is formed, the core of which became parishes with centers in Lopasna, Darker and Rostovets. Since the end of the 14th century, the Serpukhov prince has been chasing his own coins.

As the main ally of Prince Dmitry (and part-time cousin), Vladimir help participate in the events of 1380. Serpukhov becomes one of the centers of preparation for the campaign against Mamaya. The Serpukhov militia, led by Prince Vladimir Brave, operates as part of the Ambush Regiment in the Battle of Kulikov, which was a turning point in Russian history. In honor of the victory in 1381, a stone cathedral and a church with a refectory are being built in the Vysotsky Monastery. Soon Serpukhov was ruined during a campaign to Moscow by Khan Tokhtamish (1382). There is an opinion that the Ordyn army deviated from the direct route to Moscow in order to commit an act of revenge for the participation of the local prince and militia in the Battle of Kulikov.

1389 was marked by feudal conflict: Vladimir severed relations with the Moscow prince, who did not satisfy the demands of his cousin for new possessions. At the height of the quarrel, the grand prince captured the boyar of Serpukhov's prince, Vladimir, in turn, carried out the seizure of land belonging to Dmitry. The quarrel ended with the signing of another contract between feudal lords.

In the 15th century Serpukhov was twice ruined: in 1408 by the army of Edigea and in 1409 by Lithuanians under the leadership of Prince Svidrigailo. After the death of Vladimir the Brave in 1410, the principality was divided between five sons. Serpukhov went to the eldest - Ivan Vladimirovich. Later, Vladimir's descendants participated in feudal wars on the side of The Moscow Princes until the independent principality was liquidated in 1456, when Prince Vasily Yaroslavich, grandson of Vladimir the Brave, was imprisoned. Serpukhovsky brigade as part of the Moscow army participated in the campaign to Novgorod in 1478, and in 1480 in standing on the Egre.

=== Between the Tatar-Mongolian yoke and the Time of Troubles ===
Between 1496-1502, the former Kazan khan Mohammad-Amin of the Ulu-Muhammad dynasty, who was given Serpukhov, Hatun, and Kashira, was in the service of the Moscow ruler. This period in the history of the city is characterized by the oppression of local residents and violence by the henchman Ivan III. The next time Serpukhov was fed in 1532-1533 at another exiled Khan from Kazan, Shigale, who belonged to the Astrakhan dynasty of the Kasimov rulers. Shigalei, who was found to be in contact with Kazan, who violated feeding conditions, was exiled to Beloozeroin January 1533.

From the end of the 15th century, a period of grueling raids of Crimean Tatars, who were dependent on the Ottoman Empire, began. The main of their routes to Moscow was Muravsky nobility, who walked from Perekop to Tula between the upper rivers of two basins - Dnipro and North Donets. A key element of the system of protection against raids was a line of fortifications along the banks of the Oki, where up to 65,000 warriors, annually assembled in Moscow, were held in the deep autumn. The most important part of the line of protective structures was the Tarus-Serpukhov-Kashir-Kolomna section. Thus, in 1512 there was a threat of a breakthrough of the Crimeans to Moscow, and in Serpukhov were concentrated troops led by The brother of Vasily III, Yuri Ivanovich, which became a barrier on the way of nomads to the capital. Five years later, in 1517, the Russian army stood up to the enemy. As a result of this campaign, the enemy was defeated the losses of the Crimeans amounted to 15,000 people. The campaign of Mehmed I Girey in 1521 led to the ruin of Serpukhov, Borovsk, Kashira and the central counties of the state. The result of the disaster was the decision of Basil III on the construction of stone fortresses on the southern borders. In 1556, the construction of the white-stone Serpukhov Kremlin. In the same year in Serpukhov Ivan IV held a large viewing of serving people.

In 1565, after Tsar Ivan the Terrible divided the Russian state into an oprichnina and the land, the city became part of the last. With the construction of the new fortress Serpukhov increases its role in the defensive system and since 1572 the Grand Regiment of the Russian Army has been located here.

In 1571 there was a campaign of The Virgin I Giret. In April, the Crimean army crossed the Oma in the area of Orla, and in May it was already near Serpukhov, where the Volynsky detachment was defeated by J. F. Vosodo, led by Ivan IV, but could not gain a foothold in it. As a result, a retreat to Moscow was undertaken, the tsar fled to the Alexandrov suburb. Devlet I besieged Moscow and burned it. On the way back, the Crimeans ravaged several counties, including Serpukhovsky. Crimean troops in the described campaign were helped by traitors, among whom was Serpukhovich Rusin, one of the children of the Boyar Shishkins. In 1572, Devlet I Girey prepared a second raid on the Russian state. A regiment of up to 10,000 men was sent to meet the enemy, led by Prince Mikhail Vorotynsky, who was stationed in Serpukhov. On June 25, 1572, the Crimean army approached Eke. Crossing the river and breaking several guard Russian detachments, the 120,000-year-old army of Devlet Gireya headed to Moscow. Vorotynsky organized the pursuit of the advancing troops, which ended with a convincing victory of the Russians in the Battle of the Young.

The last breakthrough of the Crimean Tatars to Moscow dates back to 1581, when the army of Gaza II Gireya, crossing under Serpukhov through Alone and destroying the city plantation, moved to Moscow, where it failed and was pushed south. The leadership of the Russian army was conducted from Serpukhov by the tsarist governors. Boris Godunovtook an active part in the persecution of Gaza. This moment was one of the key moments in his political ascent.

A significant event in history was the Serpukhov campaign of Godunov in 1598. The Russian army, which came to meet the Tatars, was located on the shore of Oki near Serpukhov. Boris Godunov's camp is located in a meadow near the Vlad monastery. Several weeks in a row were conducted inspections of troops and demonstration of force in front of the enemy. As a result, the ambassadors of Gaza Gireya recognized Godunov's royal title and passed offers of friendship and peace. By this time, significant donations to local monasteries on the part of the king, which began stone construction. The Temple of the Great Martyr George the Victorious, the Gated Temple of the Martyr Theod of Ankirsky and the wall of the Lord's Monastery were built.

=== Time of Troubles ===
The famine of 1601, the increase in the number of robber gangs, the uprising of peasants in 1603 did not bypass Serpukhovsky county. In a heated environment, false Dmitry I is on a trip to Moscow. In May 1605 the population of Serpukhov accepts False Dmitry I as king. The imposter's army, preparing to enter the capital, sets up a camp near the Monastery of The Lord.

After the murder of False Dmitry I and the election of Vasily Shuisky by Tsar in 1606, Serpukhov again housed a large regiment of the tsarist army, the city became the center from which the siege of southern cities, not controlled by the official authorities, was under control. At this time, the uprising led by Ivan Bolotnikov was gaining momentum. After the Battle of Krom, the rebels advanced to Moscow, taking Kaluga and Alexin along the way. In October 1606, Bolotnikov approached Serpukhov, and the locals voluntarily surrendered the city. As a result of the unsuccessful assault of the capital, the rebels retreated to Serpukhov and then to Kaluga. In the summer of 1607, Serpukhov once again became a base for the tsarist army, which on July 5–7 participated in the battle on the River Eight between Serpukhov and Kashira, where the rebels were defeated. On June 21, Shui's captive rebels were tried here. In honor of the victory of the Lord's Monastery, the king was presented with a miraculous image of St. Dimitri Uglichsky, placed in a specially constructed aisle in the Vvedensky Cathedral (later attached to the Temple of the Great Martyr George the Victorious).

During the Polish intervention, Serpukhov also did not escape military action. In January 1610 near the city a detachment of Cossacks led by Bezzubtsev defeated the Poles of Mlotsky. Soon the Cossacks left Serpukhov, who the next night was occupied by Poles. As a result, a large part of the civilian population was burnt down and a large part of the civilian population was killed.

In 1610-1611, the residents of Serpukhov participated in the First Land Militia of Lyapunov, in 1612 - in the Second Militia of Minin and Pozharsky.

As a result of the weakening of the state, which occurred during the Troubles, the nomads were again able to attack cities in Central Russia.

In 1613, Serpukhovsky County was ruined by the Nogai Tatars along with Borovsky and Kolomensky.

In 1618, hetman Piotr Sagaidachny, anally of the Polish king Vladislav, retreating with the army from Moscow to Kaluga, burned the Serpukhovsky plantation, but the fortress could not take. In 1633, the neighborhood of Serpukhov was ruined by the Crimean Tatars.

=== 17th century ===
The consequences of the events of the Troubles for Serpukhov were a sharp decline in the population and the decline of the economy. Residents, trying to reduce the tax burden, move to the monastic suburbs. The state forcibly, by the forces of a detective order, returns the population to the city plantation.

During the 17th century, Serpukhov continued to play the role of an important military center. At the beginning of the century the fortress survived a fire, after which it was restored and expanded. The head of the city administration at this time is appointed for a period of one to three years governor. In 1633, the urban suburbs of Serpukhov were ravaged by the Crimean army of Prince Mubarak-Gerai, who could not take the city Kremlin, however. In the "rebel age" the unrest could not bypass Serpukhov. In 1648, peasant riots engulfed the county. The estate of Kryvtsov's boyar son was burned down. As a result of the adoption in 1649 of the Council's settlement, the population reversed from monasteries to planting, which leads to the growth of the city and its population by 70-80%. In 1669 there is a big fire, Serpukhov burns almost to the ground.

The main occupations of Serpukhov's population in the 17th century: iron production, blacksmithing, pottery, shoe production, food, clothing. More than 40 people were engaged in trade outside Serpukhov. The 17th century is also characterized by the rise of stone construction in the city. In different years were built: the Church of Nikola (on the site of the current cathedral), the gated Three-Sacred Church, the walls and towers of the Monastery, the Baroque Church, the church of Athanasius Athos (disassembled in 1878), the new building of the Trinity Cathedral. In 1627, the Cathedral of conception was rebuilt in the Vysotsky Monastery.

=== 18th century ===
In Petrov's times, the population of Serpukhov actively participated in the construction of the fleet, new cities, and fortresses. Local craftsmen were made to participate in the king's projects. In the third decade of the 18th century, Serpukhov became one of the largest cities in the suburbs. Blacksmith production is being phased out. Trade is developing. In 1708, Serpukhov was part of the Moscow province formed. In the 1730s, one after another, linen factories began to open. In the forties, the main ones are the enterprises of Vasily and Nikolai Kishkin (the largest in the city), Vasily, Stepan and Ivan Gerasimovich Serikov, Ivan Andreevich Serikov. By the sixties, Ivan Andreevich Serikov's company was taking the leading position in Serpukhov. In addition to linen, silk and cloth factories were also opened in the city.

In 1761, 30% of the sails exported from Russia were of Serpkhov's origin. The city comes in fourth place in Russia in linen production after Yaroslavl, Kostroma and Moscow. The number of people employed in the textile industry is growing from 3,000 in the 1950s to 5,500 at the end of the century.

In addition to textiles in Serpukhov in the 80s there are eight tanners, seven brick and nine malt factories. The main areas of trade are the port of St. Petersburg (textile, leather), Moscow (food products).

=== 19th century ===
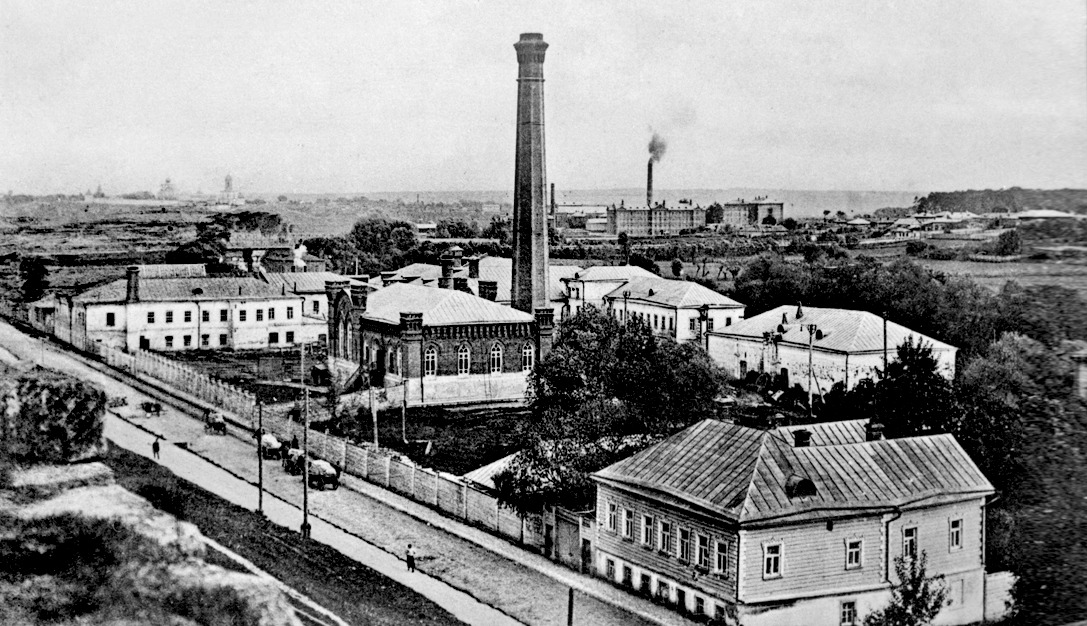
Factory belonging to the Konshin Brothers in Serpukhov, 1890

In 1812, the population of Serpukhov and the county participated in the defense of the Russian Empire following the French invasion of Russia in 1812. The militia of the Moscow province consisted of 2,246 residents of Serpukhov county. The war did not affect the city directly. The industry continued to produce most of the canvas produced in the region. At that time there were 14 factories with 855 textile mills in Serpukhov. During this period, the industry is reoriented to the production of cotton products. If in 1812 the first cotton enterprise of Alexey Ignatieff appeared in the city, in 1814 eleven factories were functioning. The largest of them were the enterprises of A. Serikov, Ignatius Shilkin, I. Serikov, Maxim Konshin. There were also three tannery factories in Serpukhov, and a paper factory was operating in the Alexandrov suburb (now the village of Borisovo).

Between 1810 and 1840, the number of people employed in urban enterprises increased to five thousand, with 950 employees employed in suburban factories in the fence, and the number of workers in other enterprises in the county to 2,000. The largest factories are owned by the Families of Konshin and Tretyakov. The leading industry of the Serpukhov industry is the production of cotton products. Thus, 4500 people are employed in seven paper-weaving and sitzenabive enterprises, 493 people are employed in ten linen. The main products of the industry: sith, mitkal, padded headscarves, canvas.

Between 1840 and 1860, Serpukhov experienced a period of intense industrial growth. By the mid-1850s, the number of people employed in the city's enterprises reached 8,500, along with the suburbs - 10,400 people. In the rest of the county, the number of workers has been reduced to one thousand, indicating an increase in the territorial concentration of production. The average size of cotton mills has grown from 487 to 742 since 1843, bringing the total number of people employed in the industry to 8,900. The leaders of the Serpukhov industry were the enterprises of N.M. Konshin (later transformed by his son into the N. N. Konshin), which owned the paper-tinget and sitzenabative factory "Old Cape" (founded by Maxim Konshin in 1814), spinning enterprise (opened in the north of the city in 1846), a paper office The New Cape weaving factory (opened in the late 1850s near the village of Glazechnya) made up the complex, which allowed to perform a full cycle of processing from spinning raw materials to finished padded products. Other sub-sectors of the textile industry include the hornets operating in Serpukhov at the same time. The production of the canvas by the middle of the 19th century is in decline: the four remaining factories in 1843 employed 126 people. From a technical point of view, Serpukhov's enterprises of that time were not highly developed: most of them used manual labor, as a motor force used horse drive and water wheels. In the 1850s, steam engines appeared.

Trade was an important part of the urban economy of the first half and mid-19th century. In the volume of trade operations Serpukhov took the second place in the province after Kolomna. The key trade routes were the road connecting Kharkiv with Moscow and the waterway along the Ska. The main items of trade - bread, wood, textiles. A significant role in the life of the city was occupied by craft production, which by 1861 employed more than 600 people. Key craft professions of the time: bakers, butchers, cobblers, tailors, fashionistas, blacksmiths, carpenters, carvers, stoves.

=== 1901–1917 ===
The city's industry in 1913 consisted of 27 plants with 17,057 people working for them, and the volume of production reached 49.6 million rubles.

=== 1917–1941 ===
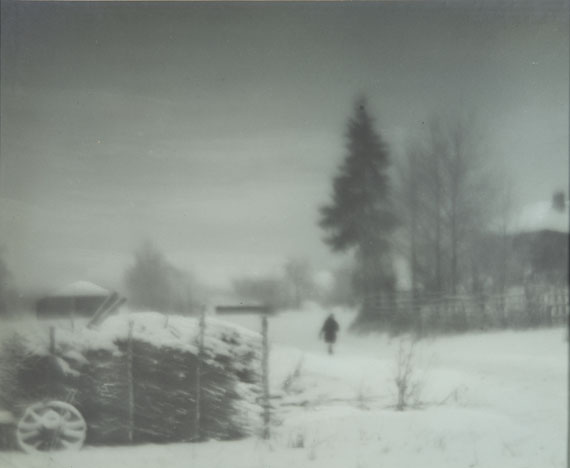
Winter in Serpukhov. Photograph, 1930

In the first days of the war, several thousand Serpukhovich went to the mobilization front as volunteers. Air defense posts were set up. The militias assembled in Serpukhov joined the division of the People's Militia of the Bauman district of Moscow after two weeks of training. At the city's enterprises, directors were given the right to introduce overtime from one to three hours a day. Donor points were organized.

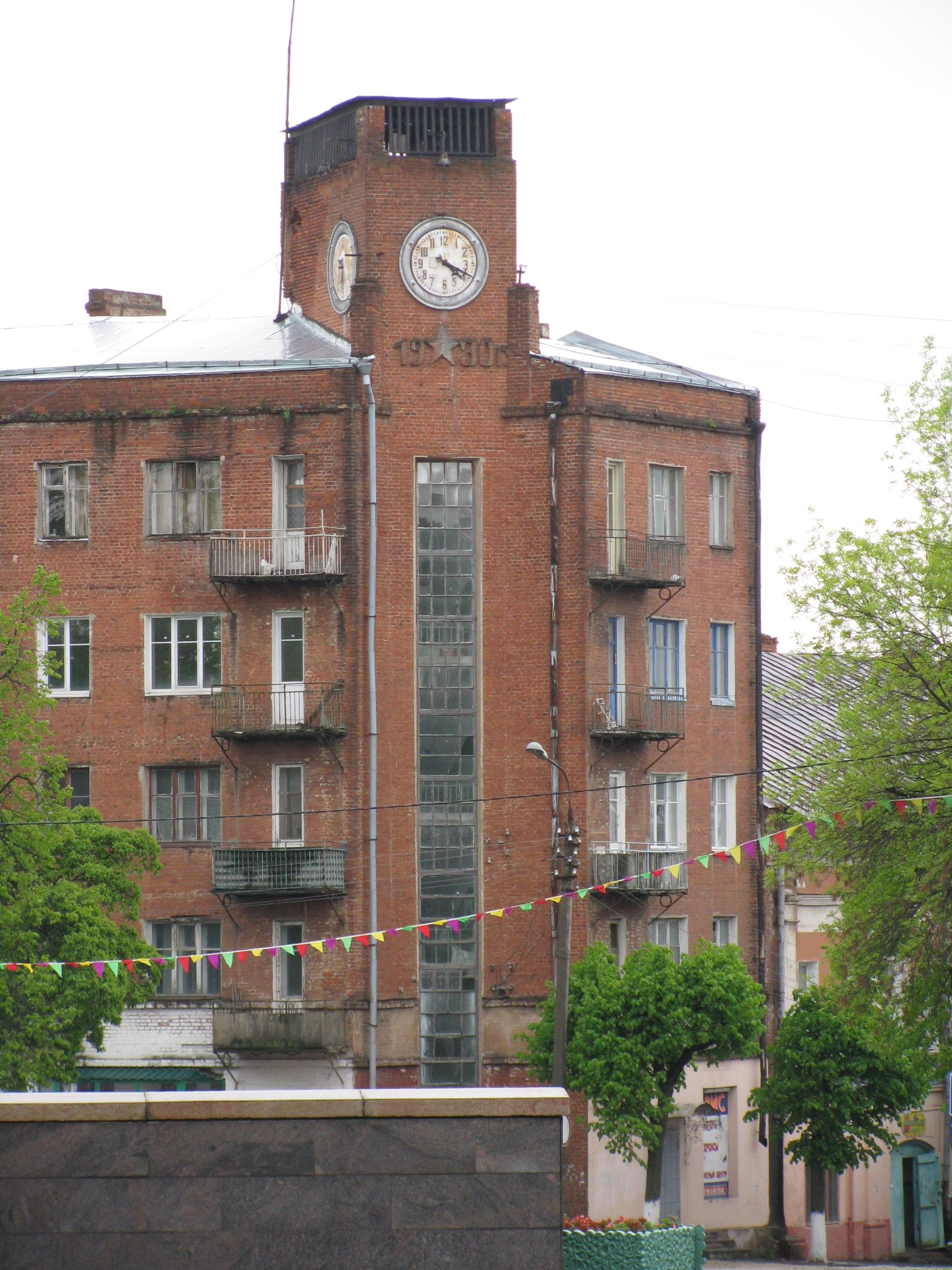
Serpukhov, Lenin Square, 12. City clock. Square Complex - Federal Landmark

In October 1941, the front line came close to the city. In the Serpukhov direction, the German-fascist troops were on the offensive as part of the 13th Army Corps, the 4th Field Army and the Motorized Units of the 2nd Guderian Tank Group. Defensive positions west of Serpukhov were occupied by the 49th Army of the Western Front under the command of Lieutenant General Saharkin, whose name is currently one of the city streets. German troops were located to the west of the city half-ring at a distance of 6-7 kilometers. The headquarters of the 49th Army was located in the village of Buturlino, east of Serpukhov. General Antipenko, the head of the army's rear, Nikolai Aleksandrovich, who was the head of the city's garrison, was in the city along with his headquarters. Serpukhov was directly defended by the 60th Infantry Division, which consisted of militias from the Leninsky district of Moscow. On October 25, 1941, the 5th Guards Rifle Division on the outskirts of Serpukhov took the line of defense of Upper-Shahlovo-Novylov-Kalinovo. On October 29, the division stopped the enemy at the turn 14 kilometers west of Serpukhov, east of Tarusa, the western outskirts of Aleksin. Parts of the 194th Infantry Division held the defense along the border of Borovna-Kremenki-Drakino. In the morning of 17.12.1941 parts of the division went on the offensive with the task of breaking through the defense on the right bank of the Protva River, on the Kremenka-Drakino section. By 25.12.1941 the division broke through the eight-kilometer defensive strip of the enemy. The air cover was carried out by the pilots of the 178th Fighter Aviation Regiment of the 6th Fighter Aviation Air Corps. The air regiment carried out a combat mission in the area of responsibility of the Southern Sector of the Moscow Air Defense Area, the leadership of which was entrusted to one of the deputy commanders of the 6th Air Defense Corps, Colonel Trifonov N.K. 178th IAP was based in the Oki border area, near the village of Lipitsa. The pilots of this regiment carried out 1695 sorties, conducted 59 air battles, shot down 22 enemy aircraft, destroyed 19 anti-aircraft guns. The regiment's commander, Lt. Col. Rakov Roman Ivanovich, personally flew 65 times on combat missions. One of Serpukhov's streets is also named after him.

The most fierce battles were fought on the Line of Drakino - Kremenka - Pavlovka. At the end of November 1941, the German offensive was halted.

In battles with the enemy also distinguished units and parts of the 1st Guards Cavalry Corps under the command of General Belov and military units of the 112th Tank Division under the command of Colonel Hetman. During the fierce battles, they thwarted the offensive of the 13th Wehrmacht Army Corps, inflicting heavy losses on it, liberated seven settlements and kept Serpukhov from encirclement and capture.

During the Mozhai-Maloyaroslavets operation, the compound and parts of the 49th Army managed to significantly weaken parts of the advancing units of the Wehrmacht, causing them significant defeat and by early December completely stopped the enemy's offensive at the border west of Serpukhov - Sukhodol (20 km southeast of Alexin).

Also in November, the evacuation of equipment of enterprises, workers, women and children began. Among the destinations were: Biysk, Ufa, Tyumen, Tashkent, Fergana. At the same time, six defensive districts are being created in Serpukhov: the Red Textile Maker, Novotkatsky, the Sitzenabive Factory District, Noginsky, the southern part of the city, and the Fence. Defensive structures are being erected: anti-tank ditches, slabs, barricades, crevices, bomb shelters, gas shelters. Hospitals were established on the basis of the surgical hospital, textile college, Semashko hospital, rabfak, schools No. 3, 11, 13, 22, 26, 28 hospitals where wounded fighters were received.

On December 16, Soviet troops went on the offensive. After the breakthrough, the German defense were released Tarus and Alexin. By January 1942, the front line was more than 150 kilometers away from Serpukhov. Since 1942, the restoration of the urban industry begins. The capacity of the city's enterprises produces tools for tank and mechanized units, motorcycle equipment, ammunition, food concentrates. In 1944, the construction of a condenser plant began. Industrial production reaches 80% of the pre-war level. In the premises of the former textile enterprises are deployed metal processing plants, the share of which in the industry of the city by 1945 was 35% against 23.4% in the textile industry.

During the war in Serpukhov, 597 buildings were destroyed and damaged, 202 civilians were killed and 317 wounded. In the early period of the war, 140 airstrikes were carried out on the city, 500 high-explosive and 35,000 incendiary bombs were dropped.

=== Modernity ===
On March 25, 1991, restoration of the Vysotsky Monastery began in Serpukhov.

In 1992, the historical version of the Serpukhov city coat of arms was restored.

In mid-1995, the AVTOVAZ concern transferred production of the VAZ-1111 Oka model to the city of Serpukhov. The plant became known as the Serpukhov Automobile Plant (SeAZ).

On July 28, 2005, celebrations dedicated to the 625th anniversary of the Battle of Kulikovo were held in Serpukhov. The event was led by Patriarch Alexy II.

On March 1, 2008, the city's first major shopping mall, B-Class, opened. At the same time, a new neighborhood, Ivanovskie Dvoriki, was developing. However, the pace of housing construction was slowing compared to previous years and continued to decline in the 2010s.

In November 2008, production of the Oka automobile ceased.

On December 17, 2011, the city's largest shopping mall, the Korston multifunctional complex, opened.

On June 9, 2014, the Serpukhov Elevator-Building Plant, which opened at the end of 2013, was visited by Russian Prime Minister Dmitry Medvedev.

On April 26, 2016, Serpukhov was awarded the title of "City of Military Valor.".

On December 30, 2018, all urban and rural settlements of the Serpukhov municipal district were merged with the urban district of Serpukhov into a single municipality, the urban district of Serpukhov.

By the resolution of January 28, 2019, the settlements of the Serpukhov district were abolished and all rural settlements were transferred to the administrative subordination of Serpukhov.

In 2018, Serpukhov became a candidate for inclusion in the Golden Ring of Russia. Large-scale improvements to streets and sidewalks, construction of new public spaces, bike paths, squares and parks, and renovation of historic buildings have begun.

In 2019, Yulia Kupetskaya became the head of the urban district. A large-scale reconstruction of the Railway Station Square took place, as did Lenin Square in 2020. In 2021, Oleg Stepanov Park was reconstructed.

The Nashestvie rock festival was planned to be held in the Serpukhov urban district from July 30 to August 1, 2021., but it was cancelled by Rospotrebnadzor and postponed by the organizers until 2022.

On January 26, 2022, the city's mayor, Yulia Kupetskaya, resigned, and Sergey Nikitenko became the acting head of the city.

== Symbolism ==
Based on the results of N.A. Soboleva's research, the main version of Serpukhov's coat of arms is the following. Serpukhov's coat of arms was designed by his friend (deputy) heroldmaster Franz Matveevich Santi in the mid-1720s. A questionnaire has been sent to the cities of Russia in order to obtain information that can be taken into account when creating the coat of arms for each particularcity. The peacock became an element of the coat of arms on the basis of a message sent to the heroldy from Serpukhov, which said that not far from the city "in the monastery one peacocks will be born".

The first coat of arms of the city was approved simultaneously with other coats of arms of the cities of the Moscow province on December 20, 1781. It was subsequently reviewed four times. The first time the coat of arms was changed on March 16, 1883, in accordance with the rules developed by Bernhard Vasilyevich Koene and introduced in 1857 with the rules of the city's coats of arms. In Soviet times, Stepan Marukhin developed a new coat of arms, approved on May 30, 1967. On July 2, 1992, a version of the coat of arms from 1883 was restored. The current version was approved on 6 October 1999 and is listed on the State Heraldic Register of the Russian Federation under No.564. It is based on the coat of arms, approved in 1883, which includes the coat of arms of 1781.

== Attractions ==
There are a significant number of attractions in Serpukhov. In total, there are 108 monuments of history and culture, of which 57 are objects of Russian Orthodox culture. There are 26 federal cultural heritage sites in the city: 39 of regional significance; 24 monuments of military glory, history and culture; 17 objects of cult architecture, and 2 monasteries, which are the main objects on display for tourists.

- Serpukhov Historical and Art Museum
- Vysotsky Monastery
- Vladychny Convent
- The monument to Vladimir the Bold (installed in 2009 in front of the city administration building)
- Lenin Square (an ensemble of historical buildings, monuments and a modern urban space with a pedestrian street)
- Sobornaya Gora and Orthodox Churches
- The building of the railway station, the square in front of it and the monument to Dmitry Donskoy and Vladimir the Bold
- A series of monuments to peacocks - a symbol of the city
- Monument to the Liberator Warrior (a mock-up of the Soviet War Memorial in Treptow Park in Berlin, sculptor Vucetich)
- Merchant buildings of the 19th century
- Factory buildings of the late 19th-early 20th
- Constructivist architecture

The citadel commands a steep hill where the small Serpeyka River enters the Nara. However, during the 19th century, parts of the citadel were demolished by the town's inhabitants, who used its limestone for their private residences. Even now the vast majority of basements in nearby houses are built from this material. In the Kremlin, the chief monument is the Trinity cathedral, built in 1696 in Moscow Baroque style.

The Vysotsky Monastery features a cathedral and refectory dating from the late 16th century, as well as the allegedly miracle-working icon Inexhaustible Chalice. Another important cloister is called Vladychny, with the Presentation cathedral and a tent-like St. George's church, both erected during Boris Godunov's reign. The latter monastery is named after the honorary title of Russian bishops, as it was founded by the holy metropolitan Alexis in 1360.

== Parks and squares ==
Within Serpukhov's borders there are about 50 gardens and squares, with there being five major parks: Prinarsky Park, Pitomnik Park, Komsomolskiy Park, Zhemchuzhina Park, and Oleg Stepanov's City Park of Culture and Recreation.

== Theatres and palaces of culture ==
These include the Musical-drama theatre, Chamber Theatre "The Looking Glass," Palace of Culture "Russia," The Palace of Culture "Istok," Korston Cinema, and the B-Class Cinema.

=== Museums ===
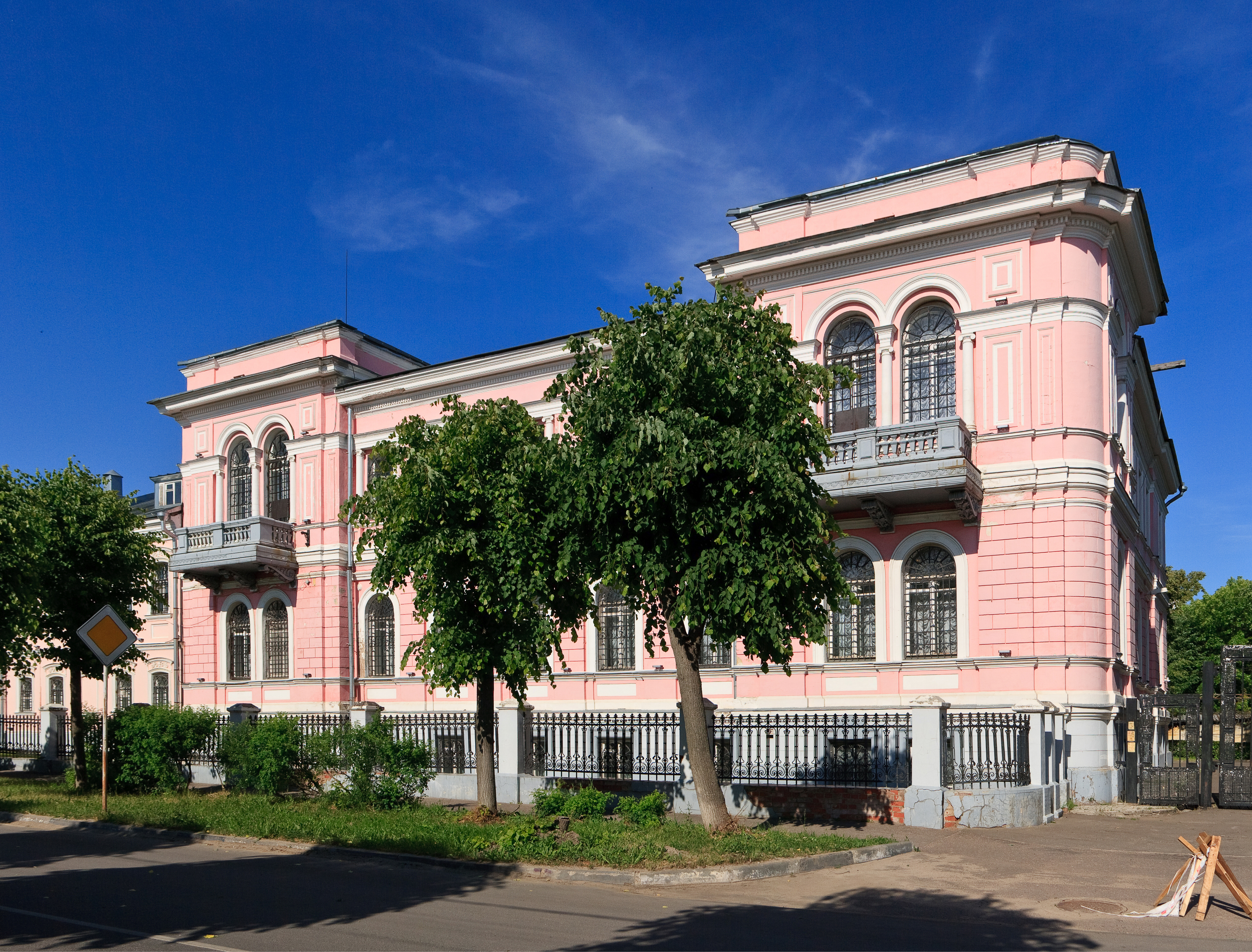
The building of the Serpukhov Historical and Art Museum

These include the Museum and Exhibition Centre, The Serpukhovsky Historical and Art Museum (opened in 1920), The Museum of Printing, the first in the suburbs, opened in September 2019 in an old printing house built on Hay Square in 1890, and The Bread Museum opened in September 2019 in a renovated 19th-century room in the Provincial Hotel and Restaurant Complex.

=== Libraries ===
Serpukhov's centralized library system was established in December 1977. Currently, the SCBS consists of nine libraries. These are the Central City Library of Chekhov, the Central Children's and Youth Library and branches of the library located in different parts of the city. The single fund of the system is 268,000 copies of documents, an extensive repertoire of periodicals, a unique collection of sound recordings, a local history fund of unpublished materials. Librarians serve more than 36.5 thousand readers a year. Library coverage is 29.1%.

=== Monasteries ===
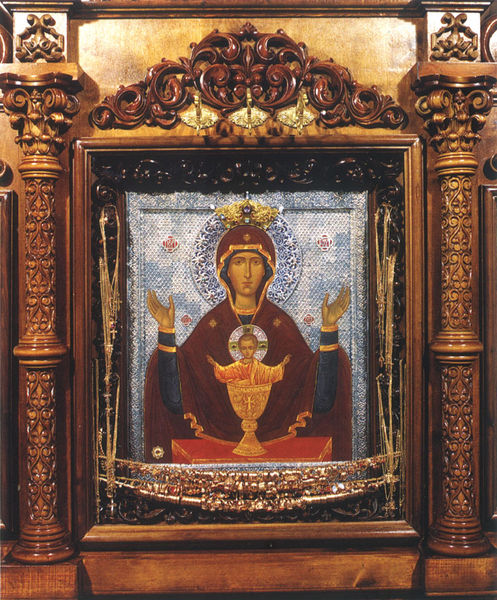
Icon of the Mother of God "Inexhaustible Chalice"

Primarily Orthodox, those being, The Lord's Convent (founded in 1360), Vysotsky Men's Monastery (founded in 1374), and in 1665-1764 in the city there was a Rasutsky monastery.

On the site of the future monastery for a long time was the wooden Church of the Nativity (mentioned in the Hundred Thon Book of 1552). The brick-laden Cathedral of the Crucifixion of Christ was built in 1719 at the expense of Princess Nazareth Mikhailovna Gagarina; at the same time the monastery changed its name.

Closed during the time of Catherine II during the secularization of church and monastic lands.

=== Temples and chapels ===
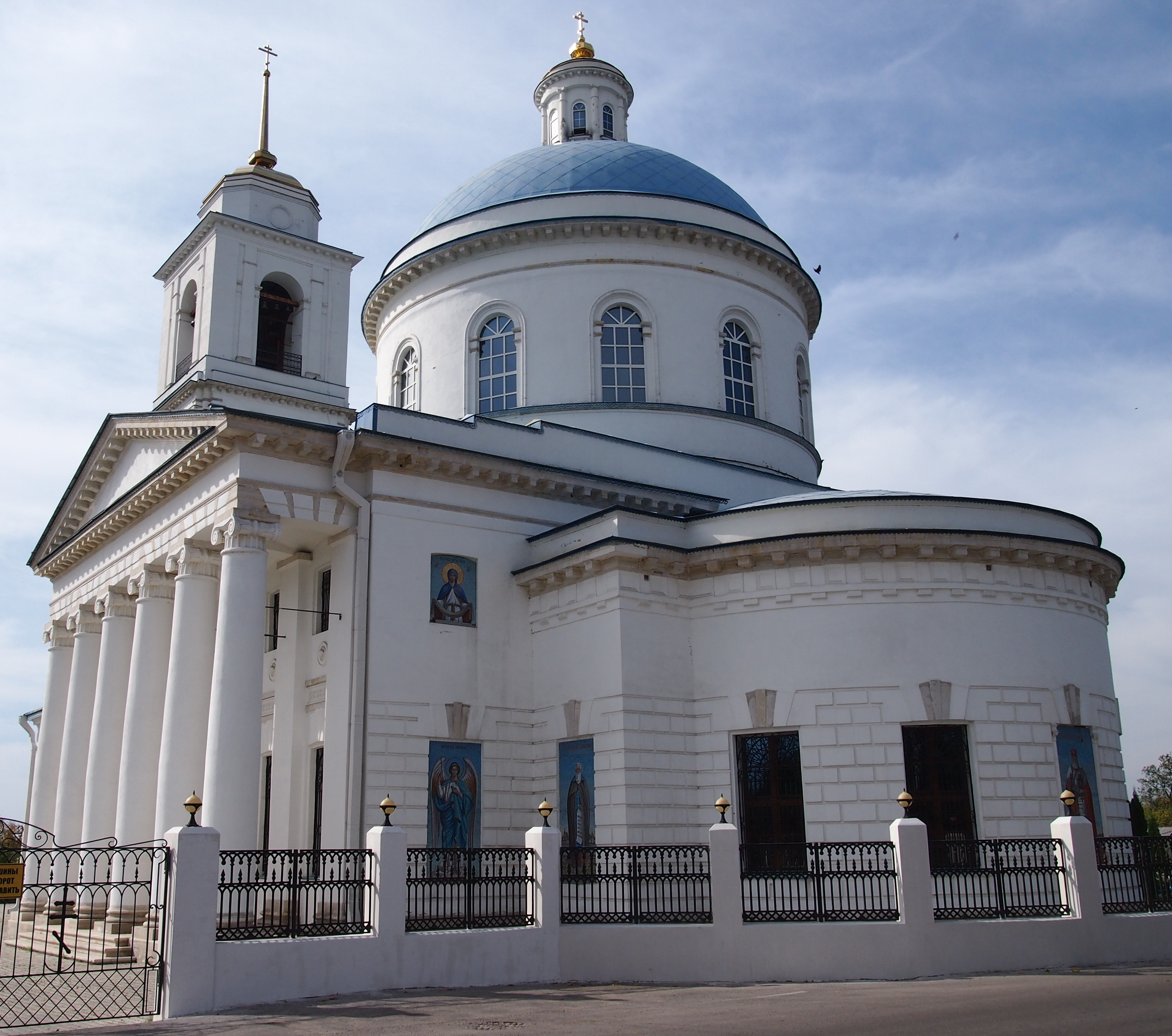
- Cathedral of St. Nicholas the White
  Elijah Church of the Prophet
- Church of the Assumption of Our Lady
- Temple of the Savior of the Unmanual
- Temple of All Saints
- Nicola White Cathedral
- Trinity Cathedral
- Sreten Church
- Epiphany Church
- Temple of the Kazan Icon of the Mother of God
- Crucifixion Church

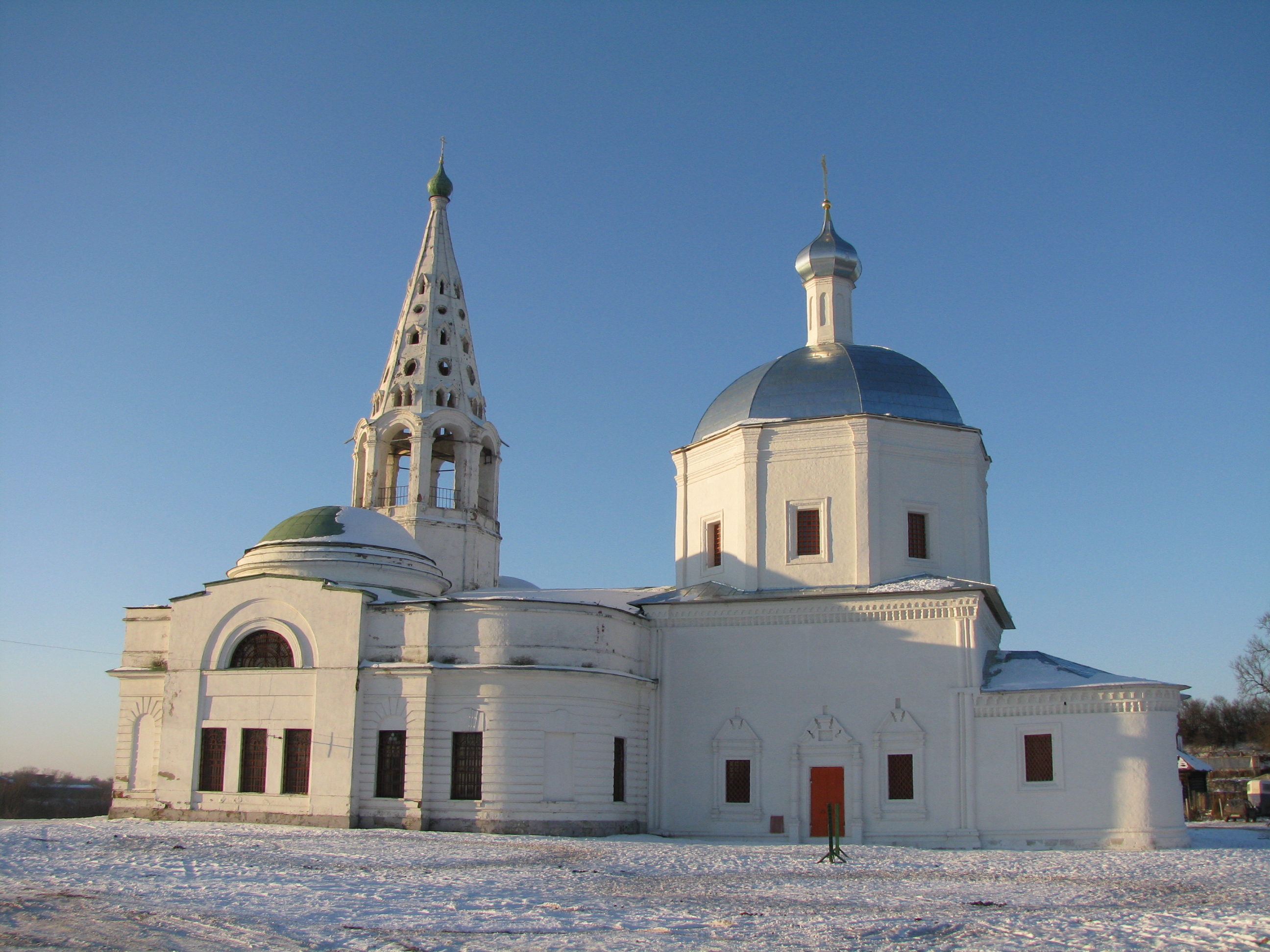
Serpukhov Trinity Church

Since 2012, the Chapel of the Great Martyr Panteleimonhas been operating on the territory of Semashko Hospital. There are also chapels of Tikhvinskaya and Iberian Icon of the Mother of God.

Orthodox churches of the city and the district are united in the Serpukhov deanery (dean's district) of the Russian Orthodox Church. The benefactor is the priest Igor (Chaban).

=== Shrines ===
Icon of Our Lady "The Unstoppable Bowl" In the Vysotsky monastery Serpukhov collected many shrines, including about three hundred particles of relics of saints. A special place is occupied by the list of the icon of the Mother of God "Inexhaustible Chalice" which, according to believers, heals from a painful addiction to alcohol, drugs and smoking (the original, which was in the Monastery of the Lord was lost after the revolution). The relics of the Rev. Athanasius Vysotsky, the younger one, are also being rethroned in the Vysotsky Monastery.

The tomb of St. Varlaam Serpukhovsky is in the Monastery of the Lord.

In 1993, in Serpukhov, the icon of the Virgin "Help for Childbirth" (revered as miraculous) was revealed. Currently, the icon is located in the cathedral of St. Nicholas of Serpukhov.

In Serpukhov is also a miraculous list of the icon of the Mother of God "The Recovery of the Dead", which, according to legend, twice saved the city from the epidemic of cholera.

== Education ==
=== Universities ===
There are two universities in Serpukhov:

- Moscow Aviation Institute (branch)
- Peter the Great Military Academy of the Strategic Missile Forces

From 1961 to 1975, the Serpukhov Artillery Technical School existed for the RVSN.

There are also a number of colleges.

=== Secondary schools ===
The city is home to a number of secondary vocational schools.

There are 21 comprehensive schools in the city, including the Lyceum, education center, 2 gymnasiums, "Orthodox classical gymnasium in the name of the Reverend Varlaam Serpukhovsky"; a large number of kindergartens and other institutions of pre-school education (including a municipal educational institution for children in need of psychological, educational and medical-social assistance, a diagnostics center and a "Chance"). The active construction of schools continues.

== Economy ==
=== Economic data ===
==== Municipal budget ====
In 2018, the budget of the Serpukhov city district by income grew by 48.5% and amounted to 6.377 billion rubles and retained its social orientation: 3.252 billion rubles or 52.9% of all expenditures were allocated to the social sphere, which is 615.3 million rubles more than in 2017.

==== Employment ====
The number of employed in the economy - 54.5 thousand people or 43% of the total population of the city, of which 20,000 people work in large and medium-sized enterprises, the rest in small businesses, for hire from individuals engaged in business without the formation of a legal entity, or are engaged in personal farms.

==== Labour market indicators ====
The local unemployment rate is 0.44%, with the number of officially registered unemployed people being 298.

Serpukhov's population, which is engaged in the economy of Moscow, providing a significant pendulum migration, the balance of which is 5.8 thousand people.

=== Industry ===
There are about 150 large and medium-sized enterprises and organizations in all sectors of the economy, and more than 1,600 small business organizations (including micro-enterprises) operate in Serpukhova. The city's industrial enterprises produce electric motors of various purposes, electric cars of low power, gyroscopic devices and precision mechanics products for navigation systems, systems of orientation and stabilization of aircraft, chemical fibers and filaments, insulation materials, reinforced concrete products, metal structures, alarm systems, capacitors, medical equipment, food.

In the first nine months of 2015, large and medium-sized manufacturing companies shipped their own products at actual prices of 13,255.3 million rubles, which is 14% more than in the same period last year.

Serpukhov's construction complex consists of about 52 construction organizations, including more than 40 small enterprises engaged in design, industrial, housing- civil and communal construction. The area of built-up land is 2.24 thousand hectares, of which 26% are occupied for production facilities, 65% for housing. Serpukhov's housing stock is represented by more than 1,136 apartment buildings with a total area of more than 3319086.22 m2.

The Serpukhov region is operated by the Serpukhov Chamber of Commerce and Industry (STPP). It is a non-governmental non-profit organization established in 1995 to promote the development of all forms of entrepreneurship in the southern suburbs. It brings together about 200 organizations and individual entrepreneurs.

=== Trade ===
Serpukhov has stores of many Russian retail chains.

There are three major shopping malls in the city:

- Korston
- B-Class
- Atlas

Serpukhov has fast food chains: McDonald's, Burger King, KFC. There are also several pizzerias.

In addition, there are a variety of cafes, bars and canteens.

The city also has a number of restaurants. Some of them are concentrated on the pedestrian street opened in 2020, where the veranda is located.

== Transport ==
Serpukhov is conveniently located at the intersection of transport routes and has a developed infrastructure. Serpukhov's transport hub focuses on railway, road and waterways, which allows local and transit services.

=== Rail ===
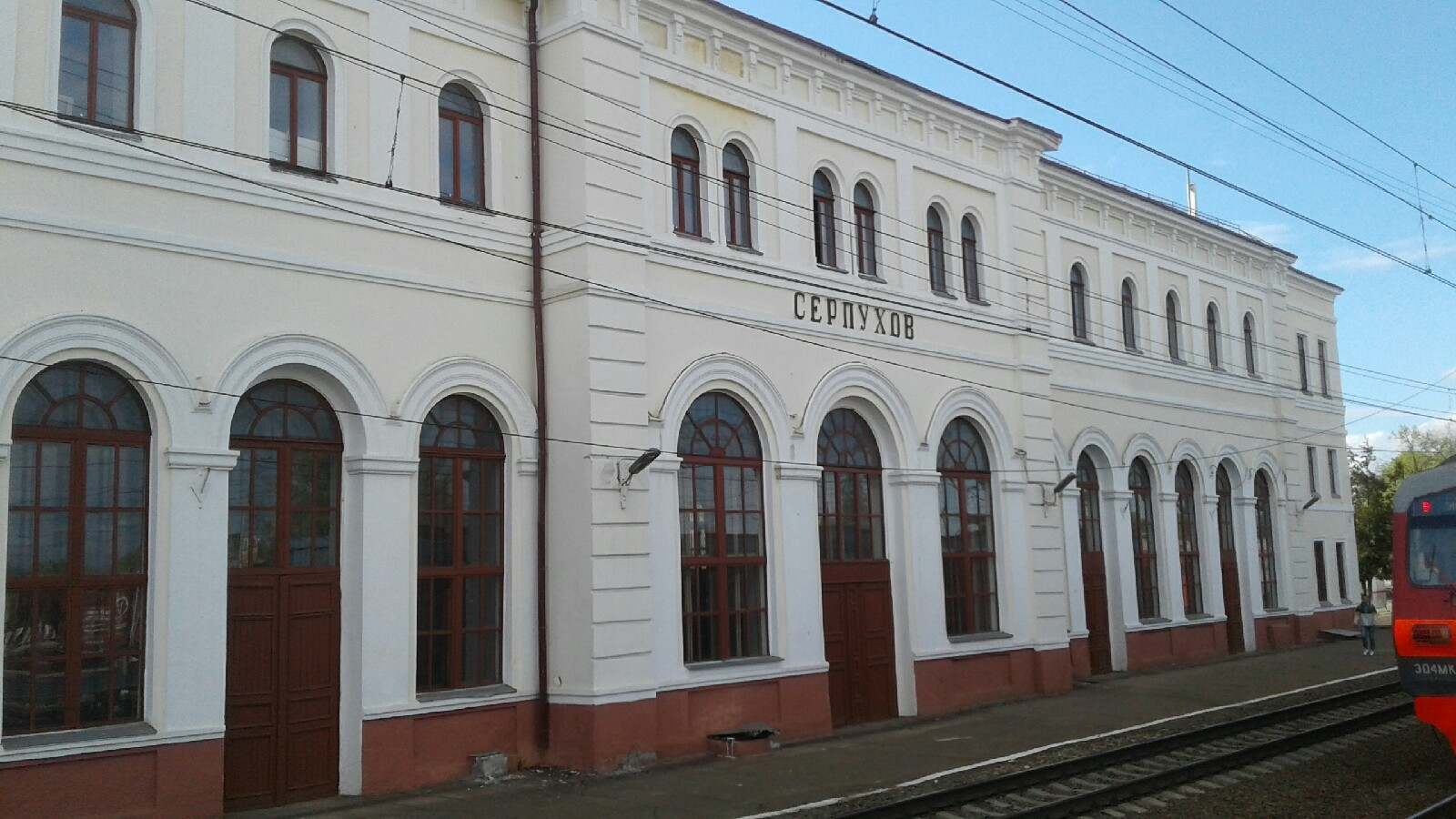
Station building: Voroshilova Street (Serpukhov railway station)

Serpukhov is connected by regular train service with Moscow (Electric trains go to Tsaritsyno station - 1.5 hours, to Kursky railway station - 2 hours). There is also a railway connection with Tula. Moreover, trains to Oryol, Kursk, Belgorod stop at Serpukhov station

- Serpukhov railway station, opened in 1865.
- Oka railway platform.

On the square near the Serpukhov station is the city bus station, from which most city, suburban and long-distance bus routes depart.

=== Road transport ===
Directly next to the city are the M2 "Crimea" motorway and highway A 108 "Moscow Big Ring", near the highways of federal importance M4 "Don" and M3 "Ukraine" are.

There are about 600 kilometres of public roads in Serpukhov and the region. The main carrier of passengers on both urban, suburban and long-distance routes is the convoy 1790 of the Ministry of Defense "Mostransavto". Commercial trucking companies also operate in the city. In total, there are 25 city bus routes in Serpukhov. Serpukhov station is the final stop and stop for most routes.

The network of long-distance bus routes, which includes in addition to Moscow, many small towns and villages.

The maintenance of municipal roads and inter-municipal roads is handled by the enterprises of Serpukhovsky DRSU and Serpukhovsky Avtodor, respectively. Serpukhov's road transport is concentrated with basic freight traffic - it accounts for 97% of all cargo, the railway - about 3%.

=== Water transport ===
Port Serpukhov, a subsidiary of the Moscow River Shipping Company, is present in the city. The port was founded in 1858 and is located on the Nara River, two kilometres from its entry into Oka. It carries out passenger and freight transport. Main passenger lines: Serpukhov - Gardens, Serpukhov - Polenovo, Serpukhov - Tarusa, Serpukhov - Velegozh. According to the official data of the shipping company, the annual passenger flow is about 30,000 people. The port produces mineral building materials (gravel, sand, soils) in the Oki water area. It carries out loading and unloading work, transportation of goods and serves three sites: Alexinsky, Serpukhovsky, and Kashirsky.

== Media ==
Only the newspaper "Communist" was present from the local media for a long time, later renamed "Serpukhovsky Vesti". The rapid development of the media began in the 1990s, when a significant number of new print publications, local television, opened, and in the 2000s it was time for radio stations. From 2004 to 2019, the city published a weekly newspaper called Oka Info.

== Sport ==
Sports facilities in Serpukhov:

- Trud Stadium
- Spartak Stadium (under reconstruction)
- Stadium «Start»
- Sports Palace "Olympus" (with a swimming pool)
- Sports center "Typhoon"
- Physical Culture and Health Complex "Russian Bear"
- Ice arena
- Aquapark

The city boasts numerous sports clubs, both amateur and professional.

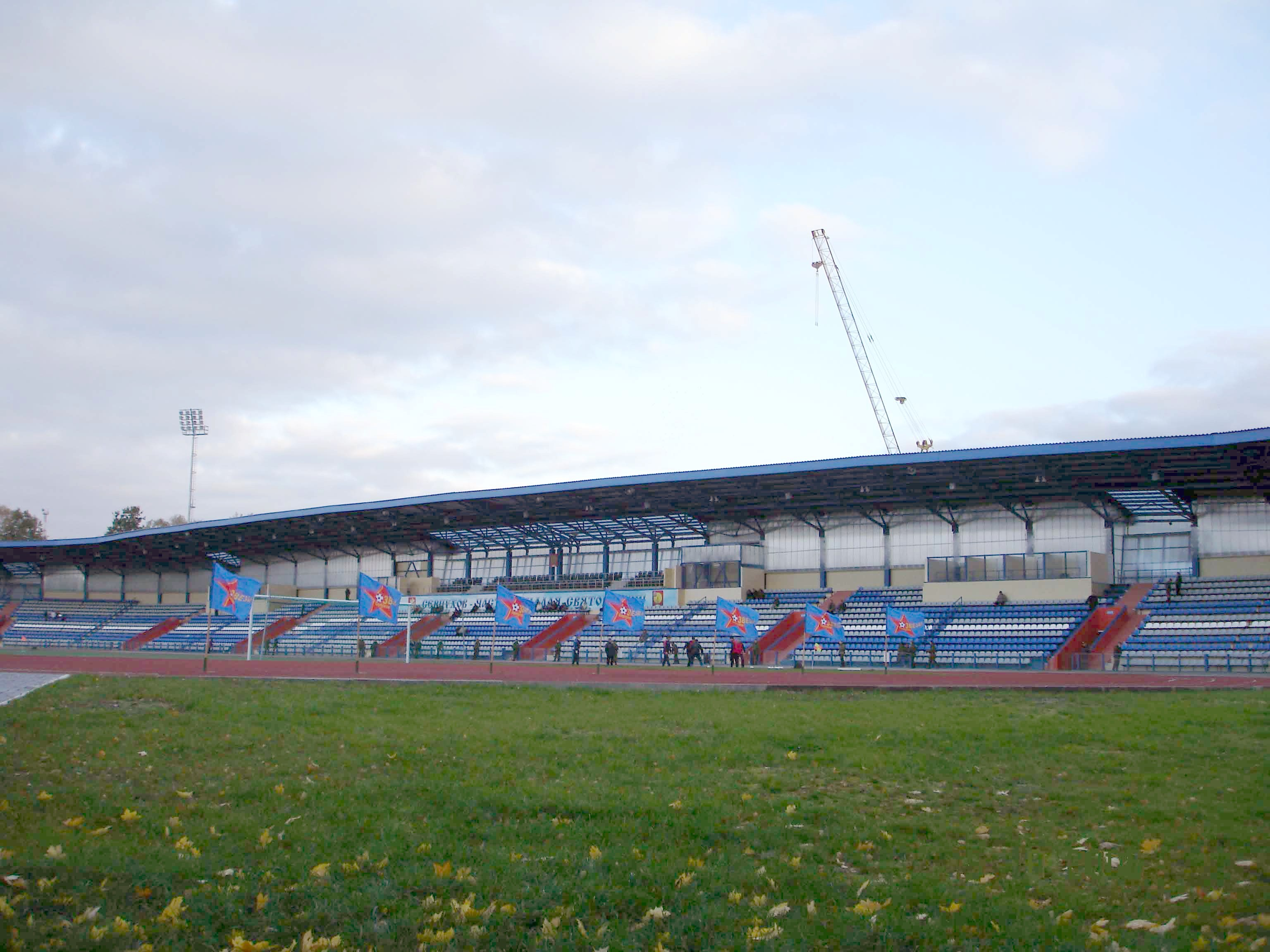
Trud Stadium. View of the field and stands from the inside.

Serpukhov was home to a professional football club in the Second Division, Zvezda Serpukhov, playing in the Center Zone. FC Zvezda played at Trud Stadium. Trud Stadium was reconstructed (essentially rebuilt) and opened in June 2005. It seats 5,300 spectators, features an artificial turf field, lighting, and a total floor area of 29,591 square meters.

Other stadiums, Spartak and Start, are located in the city's forest and are used for local and regional tournaments. Spartak is the oldest city arena, where the city's first standard-sized football pitch was built in 1910. The Spartak Stadium hosted its home matches in the Russian Second Division Championship for Dynamo Moscow's reserve team. Amateur teams FC Serpukhov, FC Istra, and FC Talant also played there, competing in the KFK Championship.

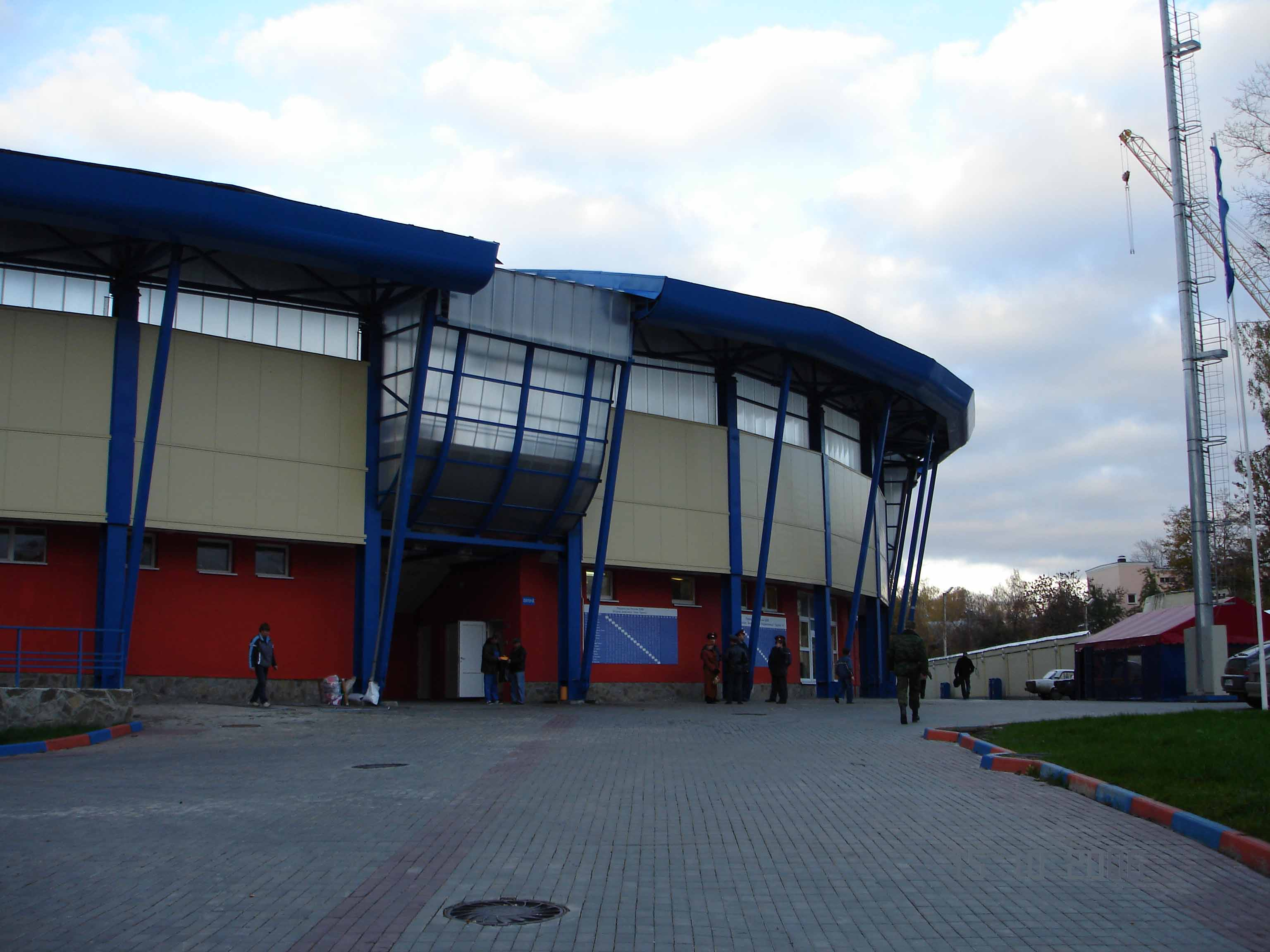
Trud Stadium. Exterior view.

Serpukhov also had another football club, Lokomotiv-M, which played one season (2005) as a professional in the Second Division.

The city is represented by the Zvezda basketball club in the Moscow Region Championship.

The city is also home to the Serpukhov Children's and Youth Olympic Reserve Volleyball Club, currently located in the "Russian Bear" sports and recreation center, which represents the city in the Moscow Region Championship.

The "Russian Bear" wrestling club is quite popular. The Serpukhov Orlov Sports Complex is renowned for its achievements in aviation sports.

Serpukhov is also famous among amateur radio enthusiasts. Serpukhov is home to the Moskovia Radio Club, which trains young radio athletes.

Since 2006, active youth in Serpukhov have been enjoying the Street Challenge, a team car competition involving search and rescue, creativity, and orienteering.

== Notable people ==
- Herman of Alaska, missionary to Alaska
- Viktor Grishin, politician
- Stanisław Leśniewski, Polish mathematician, philosopher and logician
- Oleg Menshikov, actor and entertainer
- Vladimir Shkolnik, politician

== Administrative and municipal status ==
Within the framework of administrative divisions, Serpukhov serves as the administrative center of Serpukhovsky District, even though it is not a part of it. As an administrative division, it is incorporated separately as Serpukhov City Under Oblast Jurisdiction, an administrative unit with the status equal to that of the districts. As a municipal division, Serpukhov City Under Oblast Jurisdiction is incorporated as Serpukhov Urban Okrug.

== Twin towns–sister cities ==
Serpukhov is twinned with:

- Balakliia Raion, Ukraine
- Bobigny, France
- Ceadîr-Lunga, Moldova
- Çeşme, Turkey
- Danilovgrad, Montenegro
- Forssa, Finland
- Pravets, Bulgaria
- Richmond, United States
- Sievierodonetsk, Ukraine
- Slutsk, Belarus
- Vratsa, Bulgaria
- Zaslawye, Belarus
- Zhanjiang, China
