= Aleksandr Yatsko (footballer) =

Russian footballer

Personal information
- Full name: Aleksandr Vladimirovich Yatsko
- Date of birth: 18 November 1978 (age 47)
- Place of birth: Volgograd, Russian SFSR
- Height: 1.78 m (5 ft 10 in)
- Positions: Midfielder; defender

Senior career*
Years	Team	Apps	(Gls)
2001	FC Salyut Saratov	26	(4)
2002	FC Fakel-Voronezh Voronezh	0	(0)
2002–2005	FC Salyut-Energia Belgorod	78	(9)
2006–2007	FC SKA Rostov-on-Don	30	(1)
2007	FC Tekstilshchik Kamyshin	8	(2)
2008	FC Rotor Volgograd	14	(3)
2008	FC Olimpia Volgograd	11	(3)
2009	FC Volgograd	2	(0)
2011	FC Salyut Belgorod	7	(1)
2012	FC Olimpia Volgograd	14	(1)
- * Club domestic league appearances and goals

Aleksandr Vladimirovich Yatsko (Russian: Александр Владимирович Яцко; born 18 November 1978) is a former Russian professional football player.

== Club career ==
He played for FC Fakel Voronezh in the Russian Cup. He played in the Russian Football National League for FC SKA Rostov-on-Don in 2007.
