= Vladimir the Bold =

Russian prince (1353–1410)

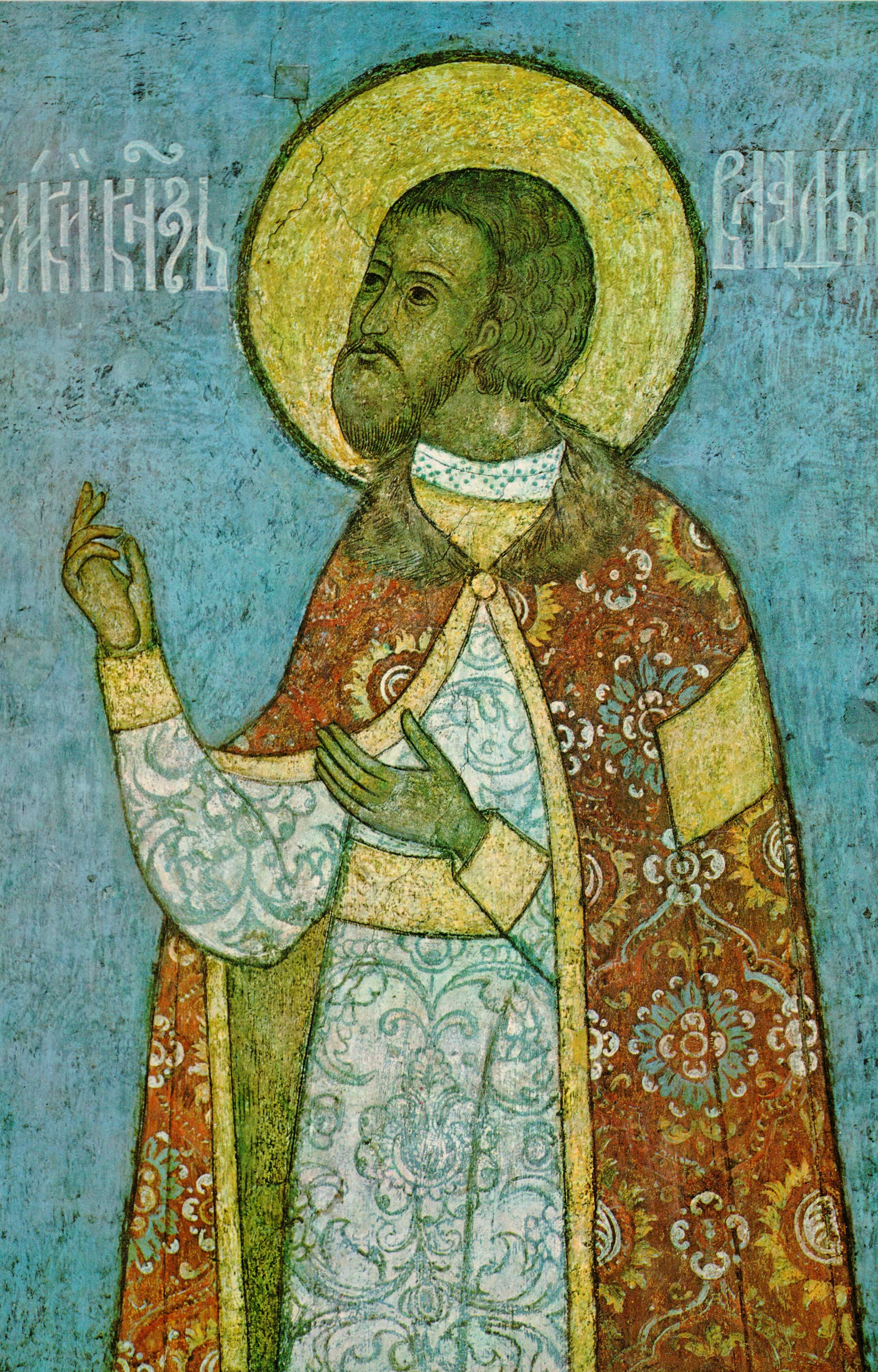
Portrait from the Cathedral of the Archangel (17th century)

Vladimir Andreyevich the Bold (Russian: Владимир Андреевич Храбрый; July 15, 1353 – 1410) was the most famous prince of Serpukhov. His moniker alludes to his many military exploits in the wars waged by his cousin, Dmitri Donskoi of Moscow. He was son of Andrei Ivanovich (1327–1353), Prince of Novgorod.

== Biography ==
A grandson of Ivan Kalita, Vladimir inherited Serpukhov, Borovsk, and a third part of Moscow from his brother at the age of 5. As his cousin Dmitry of Moscow was also a child, both princes had to be tutored by the Metropolitan Alexis who arranged a treaty stipulating Vladimir's loyalty to his Muscovite cousin.

Pursuant to the treaty, Vladimir helped Dmitry to fight Tver (1375), Ryazan (1385), the Livonian Knights (1379), and the Republic of Novgorod (1392). Although he married a daughter of Algirdas of Lithuania in 1371, Vladimir still loyally supported Dmitry in his struggle against the Lithuanians.

In 1374, anxious to defend his capital, Vladimir built the first oaken kremlin in Serpukhov. In 1377, Vladimir sacked the Severian towns of Trubchevsk and Starodub. In the great Battle of Kulikovo (1380) Vladimir commanded cavalry which decided the Russian victory. When Tokhtamysh invaded Russia two years later, Vladimir defeated his force near Volokolamsk.

It is not clear why Vladimir quarrelled with his cousin in 1388. Although they made peace the same year, Vladimir was forced to leave Serpukhov for Torzhok following Dmitry's death and enthronement of his son Vasily I. A year later, he returned to Serpukhov and concluded a treaty with Vasily, whereby he obtained the appanage towns of Volokolamsk and Rzhev. Later, he exchanged these towns for Gorodets, Uglich, and Kozelsk, while forfeiting his claims to Murom and Tarusa.

Vladimir's last military campaign was to defend Moscow against the horde of Edigu in 1408. He died two years later and was interred in the Archangel Cathedral. His seven sons continued the lineage of Serpukhov princes until 1456. His granddaughter Maria of Borovsk married Vasily II and gave birth to Ivan the Great, who expelled the last princes of Serpukhov to Lithuania. The last of Vladimir's male-line descendants died in 1521.
