= Wolves and Sheep =

Play by Alexander Ostrovsky

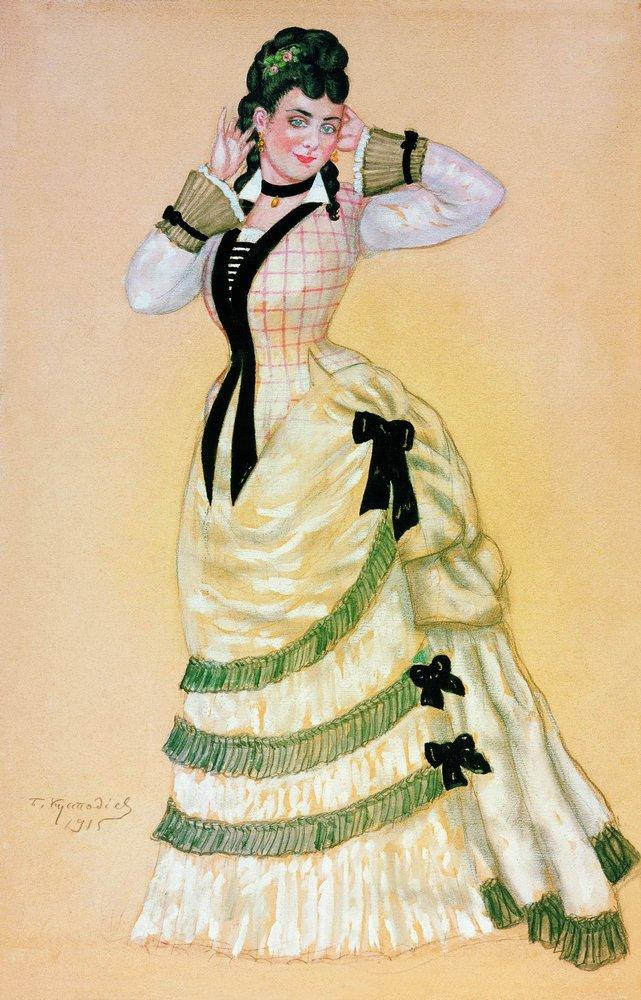
Boris Kustodiev's sketch of Kupavina for the play

Wolves and Sheep (Russian: Волки и овцы) is a play by Alexander Ostrovsky. It was written in 1875, and published in the journal Otechestvennye Zapiski, №11, the same year. It was staged for the first time in St. Petersburg, December 8, 1875 in the Alexandrinsky Theatre. It premiered in Moscow the same year on December 26, at the Maly Theatre.

== Plot ==
The action comedy takes place in a small provincial Russian city in the 1870s.

Young, beautiful and wealthy widow Kupavina dreams of happiness and love. She has no idea what passions boil around her. Many haunted her wealth, vast forests, beautiful name.

The imperious and ambitious landowner Murzavetskaya trying to take over the property Kupavina. By deception, fraud, intimidation Murzavetskaya trying to subdue the young widow. It also has plans to marry her of his dissolute nephew. And that it is almost possible. But there is more cunning, more shrewd and intelligent man, who for a long time and liked the pretty widow, and its capital. It Berkutov - Kupavina's neighbor. He enters into a decisive duel with cunning and fraudsters - Murzavetskaya and its obsequious entourage, directing for action at the right, advantageous only to him on track. As a result, he wins.
