= Nara (Oka) =

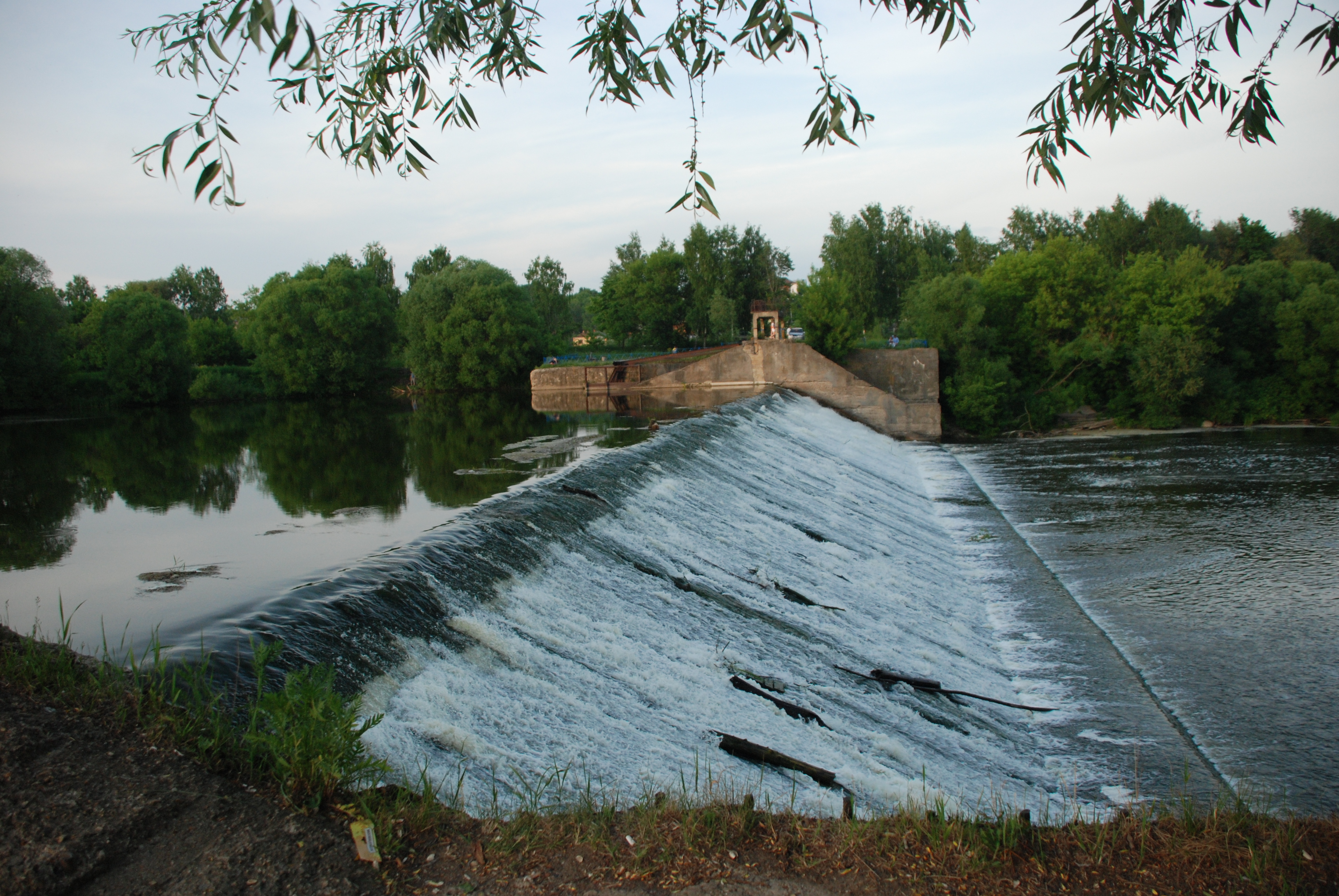
- Dam on the river Nara in Serpukhov
- Native name: Нара (Russian)

Location
- Country: Russia

Physical characteristics
- Mouth: Oka
  - coordinates: 54°53′01″N 37°24′43″E
- Length: 158 km (98 mi)
- Basin size: 2,030 km^{2} (780 sq mi)

Basin features
- Progression: Oka→ Volga→ Caspian Sea

The Nara (Russian: Нара) is a river in the Moscow Oblast and Kaluga Oblast in Russia. It is a left tributary of the Oka. The length of the river is 158 kilometres (98 mi). The area of its basin is 2,030 square kilometres (780 sq mi). The Nara freezes up in November–December and stays under the ice until April. The cities of Naro-Fominsk and Serpukhov are located on the Nara River.

Etymologically, the name Nara is of Baltic origin, a cognate of the Lithuanian nerti generally meaning "to dive, swim downstream" as well as "to net, crochet". This is because the area around its course was once inhabited by Eastern Galindians (Russian: Goliadj, голядь), a Baltic tribe.
