= Of Ryazan =

Toponymic epithet

Of Ryazan is a toponymic epithet associated the Principality of Ryazan or the city Ryazan. Notable people with this epithet include:

- Anna of Ryazan
- Eupraxia of Ryazan
- Fyodor I of Ryazan
- Fyodor II of Ryazan
- Gleb Vladimirovich of Ryazan
- Ivan I of Ryazan
- Ivan II of Ryazan
- Ivan III of Ryazan
- Ivan IV of Ryazan
- Ivan V of Ryazan
- Oleg I of Ryazan
- Oleg II of Ryazan
- Stefan of Ryazan
- Vasily Ivanovich of Ryazan
- Vasily Konstantinovich of Ryazan
- Yuri of Ryazan

== See also ==
- Prince of Ryazan
