= Lithuanian–Muscovite War (1368–1372) =

Raids on Moscow by Algirdas

- Part of the Muscovite–Lithuanian Wars
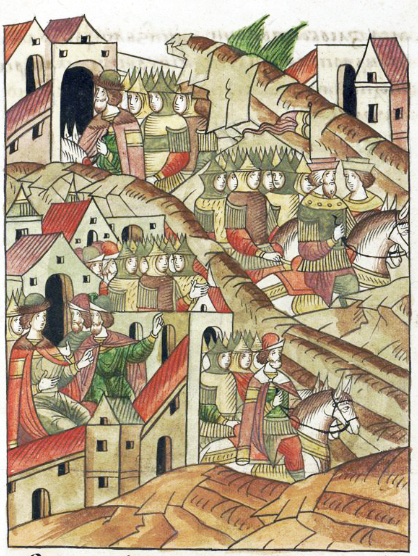
- Algirdas retreats from Moscow in 1370, miniature from the Illustrated Chronicle of Ivan the Terrible
Date	1368–1372
Location	Moscow, Lyubutsk
Result	Treaty of Lyubutsk

Belligerents
Grand Duchy of Lithuania; Principality of Tver	Principality of Moscow

Commanders and leaders
Algirdas; Mikhail II of Tver; Kęstutis	Dmitry Donskoy; Vladimir the Bold

The Lithuanian–Muscovite War, known in the Rogozh Chronicle as Litovschina (Russian: Литовщина), encompasses three raids by Algirdas, Grand Duke of Lithuania, to the Principality of Moscow in 1368, 1370, and 1372. Algirdas organized the raids against Dmitry Donskoy in support of the Principality of Tver, chief rival of Moscow. In 1368 and 1370, Lithuanians besieged Moscow and burned the posad, but did not succeed in taking the city's Kremlin. In 1372, the Lithuanian army was stopped near Lyubutsk where, after a standoff, the Treaty of Lyubutsk was concluded. Lithuanians agreed to cease their aid to Tver, which was defeated in 1375. Mikhail II of Tver had to acknowledge Dmitry as "elder brother".

== Background ==
Influence and power of the Principality of Moscow grew steadily and its interests clashed with those of Lithuania. After the Battle of Blue Waters in 1362 Lithuania took over the Principality of Kiev and became a direct neighbor of Moscow. In 1368, Mikhail II of Tver became Prince of Tver. Dmitry Donskoy and Alexius, Metropolitan of Moscow, invited Mikhail to Moscow and imprisoned him. Mikhail was released when envoys of the Golden Horde arrived and Dmitry did not want to involve the Tatars in the Moscow–Tver dispute. Mikhail fled to Lithuania to ask assistance of Algirdas, who was married to his sister Uliana of Tver. Algirdas decided to assist the Principality of Tver, chief rival of Moscow, and sought to put Mikhail on the throne of Vladimir, a long-time possession of Moscow.

== Conflict ==
=== First raid ===
In 1368, Algirdas gathered a large army, which included his brother Kęstutis and forces from Tver and Smolensk. The army was assembled in secret and marched quietly so that not to give an advance warning to the Russians. After crossing the Lithuania–Russia border, Lithuanians began pillaging and burning various villages while Russians hastily assembled a defensive force, commanded by Dmitry Minin (boyar of Dmitry Donskoy) and Akinfiev Shuba (boyar of Vladimir the Bold). Lithuanians killed Semion, son of Prince Dmitry of Starodub-on-the-Klyazma. They then captured Obolensk killing Prince Konstantin Obolensky. On November 21, 1368, the Lithuanians defeated the Russian defense forces on the Trosna River and killed its commanders and other boyars. Dmitry Donskoy retreated to the Moscow Kremlin, behind the walls that were completed just a few months before, and ordered to burn the posad so that the Russian defense would have a better position. The Lithuanians surrounded the Kremlin, burned and looted, but retreated three days later without a serious attempt at taking the stronghold.

=== Second raid ===
'In the year 1370 (...), Olgerd [Algirdas] with the Lithuanians was near Moscow and burned the outer town.'

— Novgorod First Chronicle

In early 1370, Moscow attacked Tver and Bryansk which belonged to the Grand Duchy of Lithuania. Mikhail II of Tver traveled to the Golden Horde and obtained a yarlyk for the throne of Vladimir. Mikhail attempted to establish his rule in Vladimir, but failed and retreated to Lithuania asking for help. At the end of November 1370, Algirdas organized the second raid towards Moscow. His forces included his brother Kęstutis, Mikhail II of Tver, and Svyatoslav II of Smolensk. On November 26, the Lithuanian army besieged Volokolamsk. The battle continued for two days. Lithuanians killed Prince Vasily Ivanovich Berezuysky, commander of the city's defenses, but did not succeed in capturing the city. The army marched forward and besieged Moscow on December 6. Algirdas' forces burned and pillaged, but did not succeed in taking the city's Kremlin where Dmitry Donskoy had retreated. This time Donskoy had allies ready to march: his cousin Vladimir the Bold in Peremyshl and Prince Vladimir of Pronsk with troops from Ryazan. Therefore, a truce was concluded and Algirdas retreated after eight days.

=== Between the raids ===
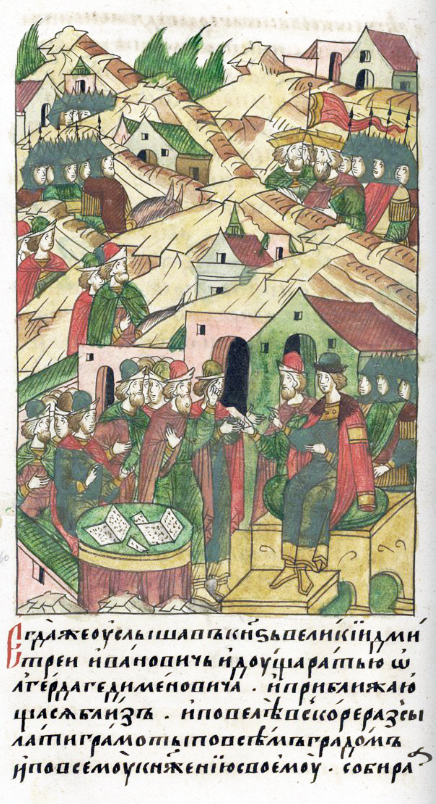
Dmitry Donskoy writes letters, asking for help against Algirdas during the Lithuanian–Muscovite War (1368–1372)

After the 1370 raid, Alexius, Metropolitan of Moscow, excommunicated all Russian princes that supported the Lithuanians; these excommunications were quickly approved by Patriarch Philotheus I of Constantinople. Algirdas responded with his own letter listing injustices committed by the Russians. In particular, Algirdas complained that Dmitry Donskoy attacked nine Lithuanian fortresses on the upper Volga and Oka Rivers and requested appointment of a new metropolitan bishop of Lithuania. The Patriarch sent apocrisiarius Cyprian to Lithuania to investigate. Algirdas succeeded in winning over Cyprian and eventually promoting him to Metropolitan of Kiev and all Rus'. But it seems Algirdas also wanted peace as his daughter Helen married Vladimir the Bold at the end of 1371. In the meantime, Tver and Moscow continued to compete and each obtained new yarlyks for Vladimir. In December 1371, the Muscovites defeated prince Oleg II Ivanovich of Ryazan in the Battle of Skornishchevo; he was exiled for six months before returning to his throne.

In spring 1372, Lithuanians raided Russian lands again. This time Algirdas did not participate. The Lithuanian Army was commanded by Kęstutis and his son Vytautas and Algirdas' son Andrei of Polotsk. They attacked Pereslavl-Zalessky, burned the posad and churches, looted and extracted a ransom. At the same time Mikhail II of Tver attacked Dmitrov. Then the two armies attacked Kashin and its duke acknowledged Tver's suzerainty. Then the Lithuanian Army retreated through Tver and Torzhok.

=== Third raid ===
The third and the last campaign by Algirdas was organized in summer 1372. This time Dmitry Donskoy marched with his army to meet the invaders and the Lithuanian army was stopped near Lyubutsk, a fort on the Oka River northeast of Tula. Lithuanian vanguard troops were defeated and had to retreat. The two armies were separated by a steep ravine which was not suitable landscape for combat. After a period of standoff, the Treaty of Lyubutsk was concluded. Algirdas agreed to abandon the plans of promoting Mikhail thus ending Lithuania's assistance to Tver.

== Aftermath ==
Mikhail II of Tver did not end his war with Moscow. He once again obtained a yarlyk for Vladimir and attempted to establish his rule. Dmitry Donskoy assembled a large army and besieged Tver. Dmitry had support of many Russian dukes, including Svyatoslav II of Smolensk who fought for Mikhail in 1370 (Lithuanians revenged that by raiding Smolensk in fall 1375). Seeing an overwhelming force and not having his Lithuanian allies, on September 3, 1375, Mikhail agreed to acknowledge Dmitry as elder brother and abandoned independent dealings with the Lithuanians or the Golden Horde. Thus while Mikhail retained his title, the Principality of Tver became dependent on Moscow. Khan Mamai burned Novosil as retribution for breaking the yarlyk, but it was too late to change the situation.

The raids to Moscow consumed many resources at the time when Lithuania faced another war with the Teutonic Order and suffered several defeats, particularly the Battle of Rudau in February 1370. The raids were a tactical defeat. Lithuania did not gain any new territory and lost Tver, one of its most reliable allies. They strengthened Moscow's prestige and influence in Rus' and signified that Lithuanian eastward expansion into Slavic lands was coming to an end. The peace between Lithuania and Moscow lasted for about seven years until 1379, when after the death of Algirdas in 1377 his eldest son Andrei of Polotsk allied himself with Moscow against Jogaila.

== Story according to Lithuanian chronicles ==
The raids were not mentioned by the early Lithuanian Chronicles. The Bychowiec Chronicle, a late and generally unreliable source, introduced the war to Lithuanian historiography. The chronicle merged the three raids into one and added a colorful exchange of threats between Algirdas and Dmitry Donskoy. In one of the threats, Algirdas promises to kiss Dmitry with his spear and to rest his spear against the Kremlin's Wall. Algirdas then invades the Principality of Moscow and Dmitry Donskoy sues for peace offering a large ransom. Algirdas accepts but, just as he promised, rests his spear against the Kremlin's Wall. The poetic visual was repeated by Maciej Stryjkowski, Albert Wijuk Kojałowicz and later historians with various modifications.

The description in the Bychowiec Chronicle is clearly a piece of Lithuanian propaganda. The chronicle was compiled in the first half of the 16th century when Lithuania and Moscow were engaged in a series of Muscovite–Lithuanian Wars. The wars were unsuccessful for Lithuania – it lost a significant portion of its territory, including the strategically important Smolensk. Therefore, the chronicle used the historical event to encourage the Lithuanians to fight. The episode with the spear was probably borrowed from Polish historiography: King Boleslaus I of Poland used his sword (Szczerbiec) to hit the Golden Gate in Kiev in 1018.
