= Verderevsky =

Verderevsky Вердере́вские Verhderevsky
- boyar family
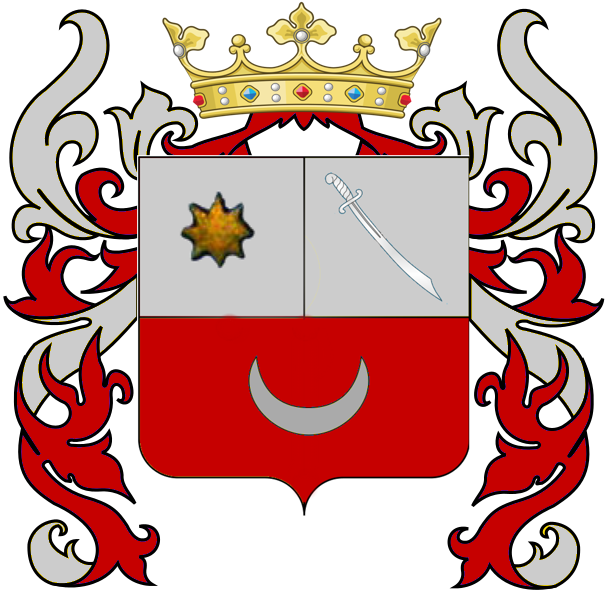
- Arms of the Verderevsky family as described in the Armorial of A.T. Kniazev, 1785.
- Current region: Russia; Canada; France
- Earlier spellings: Verhederevsky
- Origin: Golden Horde; Principality of Ryazan
- Founded: 1371
- Founder: Salohmir
- Members: Dmitry Verderevsky
- Connected families: Khitrovo, Kryukov, Shishkin, Porovaty, Koncheev, Duvanov, Apraksin, Khanikov
- Estate: Verderevo

The Verderevsky family (Russian: Вердере́вские or Верхдере́вские) is a Russian noble family from prominent boyars of the Duchy of Ryazan. The Verderevskys are listed in the 6th part of the Ryazanian genealogical book. The Verderevskys were the largest landlords in the Duchy of Ryazan: in the 16th–17th centuries they owned at least 30 allods and about 40 fiefs. Today, descendants of the family live in Russia, Canada and France.

== History ==
The Verderevsky family is considered descendants of Murza Salohmir (Salhomir), who arrived in Ryazan in 1367 (1371, according to the genealogy of the Apraksins) to the court of Duke Oleg. According to the generalogical tale, Salohmir came with his brother Edugan, who is said to be the progenitor of the Khitrovo family. Salohmir was baptized in Russian Orthodoxy under the name of Johan (Ioann) Miroslavich. Oleg II of Ryazan married off to him his younger sister Anastasia, and soon made Salohmir a boyar. He was granted with large landed estates, including Verderev, Venyov, Rostovets, Mikhailovo polye, and Besputsky stan.

In 2004 during construction works at Solotchinsky monastery (Solotchino near Ryazan), there was discovered a large memorial stone dated by April 23, 1543, for 'the brother-in-law of Oleg Ivanovich of Ryazan, Ivan Miroslavich Skhorosmir, in monkhood schemamonk Josef', saying that his body was replaced under request from his relatives.

The descendants of Salohmir included such noble families as Kryukov, Shishkin, Porovaty, Duvanov, Koncheev, Rataev, Bazarov, counts Apraksin, and Khanykov. The Verderevskys are directly descended from Salohmir's grandson, Grigory Grigoryevich Verhderevsky. Many Verderevskys were voivodes after the incorporation of the Duchy of Ryazan by Moscow. Some Verderevskys had reached the duma ranks, but none of them had ever been created Moscow boyar. Six of the Verderevskys had become stolniks under Peter the Great and one was a dumny dvorianin. Ryazanian landlord, Mikhail Petrovich Verderevsky, who had later become a stolnik (1678), was among the signers of the Sobornoye Ulozheniye of 1649.

In 1685 Stolnik Ivan Ivanovich Verderevsky build a monks' monastery in the city of Ryazan.

In the 18th century, the Verderevskys remained landlords in Ryazan Governorate. When the so-called Charter to the Gentry was established, some of the family filed to be included, together with their immediate families, in the 6th part ('ancient nobility') of the Ryazanian genealogical book (1792 - state councillor Aleksey Alekseyevich Verderevsky (1726 – after 1792); 1794 - rottmeister Ivan Vasilyevich Verderevsky (1731–1800); 1803 - court councillor Nikolay Ivanovich Verderevsky (1761 – circa 1828),. Different members of the family filed for formal nobility under the new imperial regime separately and sometimes in different parts. For instance, colonel Viktor Nikolayevich Verderevsky was added to the 2nd part ('military nobility') of the Ryazanian genealogical book. Some Verderevskys were deprived of nobility for crimes. For example, in 1859 the nobility of captain Aleksey Evgrafovich Verderevsky was revoked for corruption and he was reduced to a private. In 1862 guards porutschik Vasily Vasilyevich Verderevsky and his brother Boris were deprived of nobility and all due rights and sentenced to 12 years of katorga for accidental murder of their brother in a brawl.

After October Revolution, most family members stayed in Russia, hiding their background, while some managed to escape overseas. Now, apart Russia, descendants of the Verderevskys are found in Canada and France.

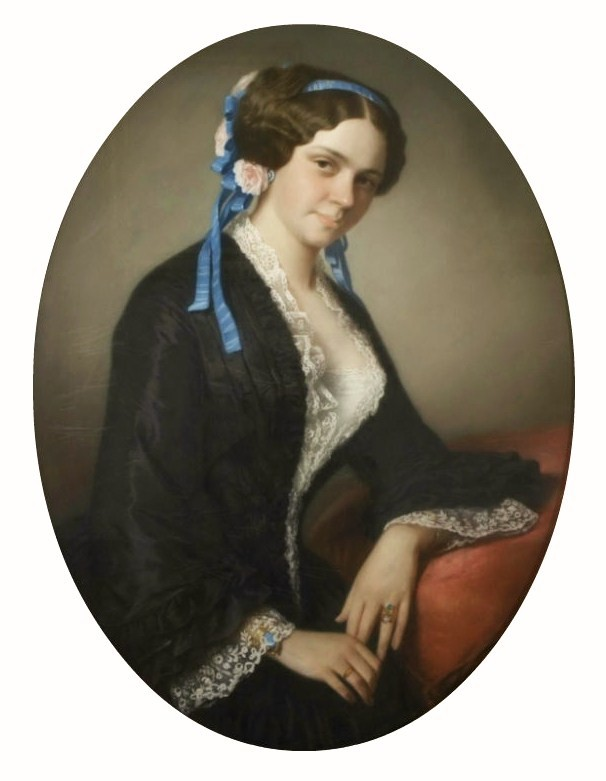
Maria Begicheva (née Verderevskaya; 1825–1879).

== Notable members ==
- Roman Grigoryevich Verderevsky was a voivode at Bryansk in 1543.
- Fyodor Vasilyevich Verderevsky was the equerry and boyar to Duchess Anna of Ryazan.
- Klementy Grirogyevich Verderevsky was a voivode at Dankov in 1569.
- Gury Grigoryevich Verderevsky was a siege voivode in the Ukrainian troops in 1581, voivode at Mikhailov in 1584, Pronsk in 1588, Bolhov in 1590 and Voronezh in 1591.
- Nikita Semyonovich Verderevsky was a voivode in Dedilov in 1555 and Ryazan in 1558.
- Yuri Vasilyevich Verderevsky was the second voivode of the Grand regiment of the Ukrainian troop in 1617.
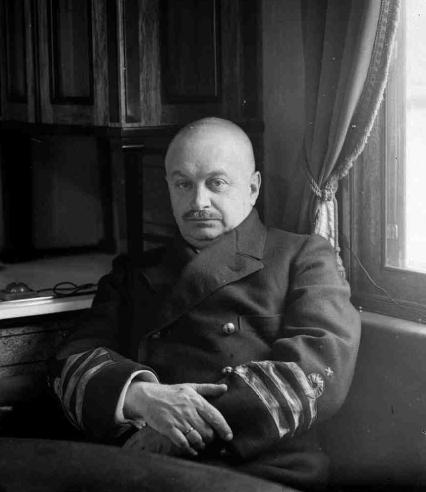
- Dmitry Verderevsky, Russian Minister of the Navy in 1917.
  Pyotr Afanasyevich Verderevsky was the second voivode of the Pskov avant-guard regiment during the Livonian campaign in 1579.
- Pyotr Vasilyevich Verderevsky was a dumny dvoryanin under Tsars Ivan and Peter.
- Nikolay Ivanovich Verderevsky (1768/1769 – 1812) was a Russian lieutenant-general of the Emperor's retinue, the director of the Emperor's department of the Ministry of war.
- Nikolay Alekseevich Verderevsky (1753–1797) was a Russian statesman, the viceroy of Podolsk in 1795–97.
- Dmitry Nikolayevich Verderevsky (1873–1947) was a Russian rear admiral and Minister of the Navy under the Russian Provisional Government in 1917.
- Eugraf Alekseevich Verderevsky (1825 – after 1867) was a Russian writer and journalist.
- Maria Vasilyevna Verderevskaya (Shilovskaya, Begicheva)(1825–1879) was a Russian salon singer, daughter of poet and translator Vasily Egrafovich Verderevsky (1800–1872). She was married to the Russian dramatist and the director of the Imperial theaters in Moscow, Vladimir Begichev.
- Ivan Ivanovich Verderevsky (1752 – after 1800) was the marshal of the nobility of Ryazan governorate (1788–1791).
- Dmitry Dmitriyevich Verderevsky (1903–1974) was a Soviet plant pathologist.

== Coat-of-arms ==
The Arms of the Verderevsky family wasn't included to the General Armorial and had never been authorized by the Russian Imperial Heraldry Department. However, the Armorial of Anisim Kniazev, published in 1785, contains the illustration of the family's arms as found on the grave of lieutenant-general Nikolay Ivanovich Verderevsky who died in 1812. Kniazev's armorial describes their coat-of-arms as follows:

The escutcheon is sectioned into three fields. The two upper fields are silver, the lower one is red. In the upper left-hand field there is a gilded star; in the upper right-hand field there is a silver-white sword. In the lower field there is a silver moon crest. The shield is sided by a mantling and finished with a noble crown with no helmet.

== Some estates ==
- Verhderev, former town, now a village in Skopinsky district, Ryazan Oblast, — hereditary granted allod.
- A fief in Melyonki, village in Okologorodny stan, Ryazan uyezd.
- A fief in Schapovo, village in Okologorodny stan, Ryazan uyezd.
- Voskresenskoye, a village in Kamenski stan, Ryazan, — in fiefdom.
- Rozhdestvenskoye, a village in Perevitsky stan, Ryazan, — in fiefdom.
- Temiryazevskoe (Fyodorovskoye), a village in Kamensky stan, Ryazan — in fiefdom prior to 1605.
- Kushunovskaya, a village in Pehletski stan, Ryazan — in fiefdom.
- Duryshkino (2/3) in Pehletski stan, Ryazan — in fiefdom.
- Istobniki, Poniski stan, Ryazan, — in fiefdom.
- A fief in Khodynino (now, Rybinsky Distcrict, Ryazan Oblast), Okologorodny stan, Ryazan, — since 1617.
- Korovino Bolshoye (settlement; now, Zakharovsky District, Ryazan Oblast) and Korovino (Vorypayevo, village) in Kobylsky stan, Ryazan, — in hereditary ownershipsince 1628.
- Frolovo, a village in Kobylsky stan, Ryazan, — in hereditary ownership.
- Khrapovo, a village in Okologorodny stan, Ryazan, — in hereditary ownership.
- Monastyr (Moschenoye), Kamensky stan, Ryazan, — in hereditary ownership since 1673.
- Podymovo, Kamensky stan, Ryazan, — in hereditary ownership since 1673.
- Mostye, Ryazhsky uyezd, — in hereditary ownership since the late 17th century.
