= Battle of Skornishchevo =

- Part of the Lithuanian–Muscovite War (1368–1372) and the Great Troubles
Date	14 December 1371
Location	Skornishchevo. Ryazan, Ryazan Oblast, Russia 54°41′07″N 39°39′47″E
Result	Muscovite victory
Territorial changes	Oleg II of Ryazan temporarily abandoned the Principality of Ryazan

Belligerents
Principality of Moscow	Principality of Ryazan

Commanders and leaders
Dmitri Mikhailovich Bobrok	Oleg II of Ryazan

The Battle of Skornishchevo was fought between the Principality of Moscow and the Principality of Ryazan on 14 December 1371. The battle took place near Pereyaslavl Ryazansky on the site, which was called Skornishchevo. The Muscovites won the battle, forcing Oleg II of Ryazan to flee, and not return to his throne for six months. The battle took place within the context of the Lithuanian–Muscovite War (1368–1372), and the wider Great Troubles within the Golden Horde (1359–1381).

== Background ==
After the death of prince Ivan II Ivanovich of Moscow (1359), a lingering dispute between Moscow and Ryazan resurfaced, primarily due to the new Muscovite prince Dmitri Ivanovich (later known as "Donskoy")'s relations with Tver and Lithuania. In 1370, troops from Ryazan and Pronsk went to help the Muscovites against the Lithuanian grand duke Algirdas (Olgerd). But the following year, an open war began between Moscow and Ryazan. On 14 December 1371, Dmitri Donskoy sent his troops to Ryazan under the command of Dmitri Mikhailovich Bobrok of Volhynia. Prince Oleg II of Ryazan assembled his squad, and cheerfully took to the battle.

== The battle ==
The Ryazanians had already forgotten the failures of the previous wars with the Muscovites. The first 20 years of Oleg Ivanovich of Ryazan's reign awakened in them the consciousness of their own strengths, and they had previously discovered the certainty of victory. This confidence gave was met by northern chroniclers with contempt.

"Ryazanians, fierce and proud people, were so uplifted in their mind, that they began to talk to each other insanely: do not take armor and weapons with you, but take only belts and ropes with which to tie up the timid and weak Muscovites. The latter on the contrary walked with humility and sighing, calling on God to help. And the Lord, seeing their humility, raised the Muscovites, and the pride of the Ryazans was humiliated."

The battle took place near Pereyaslavl Ryazansky on the site, which was called Skornishchevo. While the Muscovite leader Bobrok was one of the most talented military commanders of the era, Oleg of Ryazan was extremely confident, despite lacking the experience of his counterpart. The Chronicle of the battle indicates that Dmitri Bobrok exploited the excessive arrogance of his enemies.

"The Ryazanians waved belt loops in vain, the chronicler continues; They fell like sheaves and were killed like pigs. So the Lord helped Grand Prince Dmitri Ivanovich and his soldiers: they defeated the forces of Ryazan, and their prince, Oleg Ivanovich, barely escaped with a small group of followers."

Belt and rope loops, which are mentioned in the chronicle, were probably nothing else than lassos, first used by the Ryazanians in the battle of Skornishchevo, but which were currently used by the Tartars in the steppes. No doubt, these lassos deceived the chronicler, who attributed to the Ryazanians such a frivolity, that they did not want to take weapons with them.

== Consequences ==
Oleg fled. Vladimir Yaroslavovich Pronsky took control of Pereyaslavl Ryazan in his stead. Six months later, Oleg returned to the capital with the help of the Tartar Murza.
