= Oleg of Ryazan =

Oleg of Ryazan might refer to two medieval dukes:

- Oleg I of Ryazan, nicknamed the Red, ruled the Principality of Ryazan in 1252–1258
- Oleg II of Ryazan, ruled the Principality of Ryazan in 1389–1402
