= Ivan III (disambiguation) =

Ivan III may refer to:

- Ivan III Nelipac (died 1434), viceroy of Croatia
- Ivan III of Russia (1440–1505), grand prince of Moscow and later sovereign of all Russia
- Ivan III of Ryazan, grand prince of Ryazan (1427–1456)
- Ivan III Draskovic (1595 or 1603 – 1648), Croato-Hungarian warrior and statesman, Palatine of Hungary
- Ivan Asen III, tsar of Bulgaria 1279–1280
