= Volzhskaya tower =

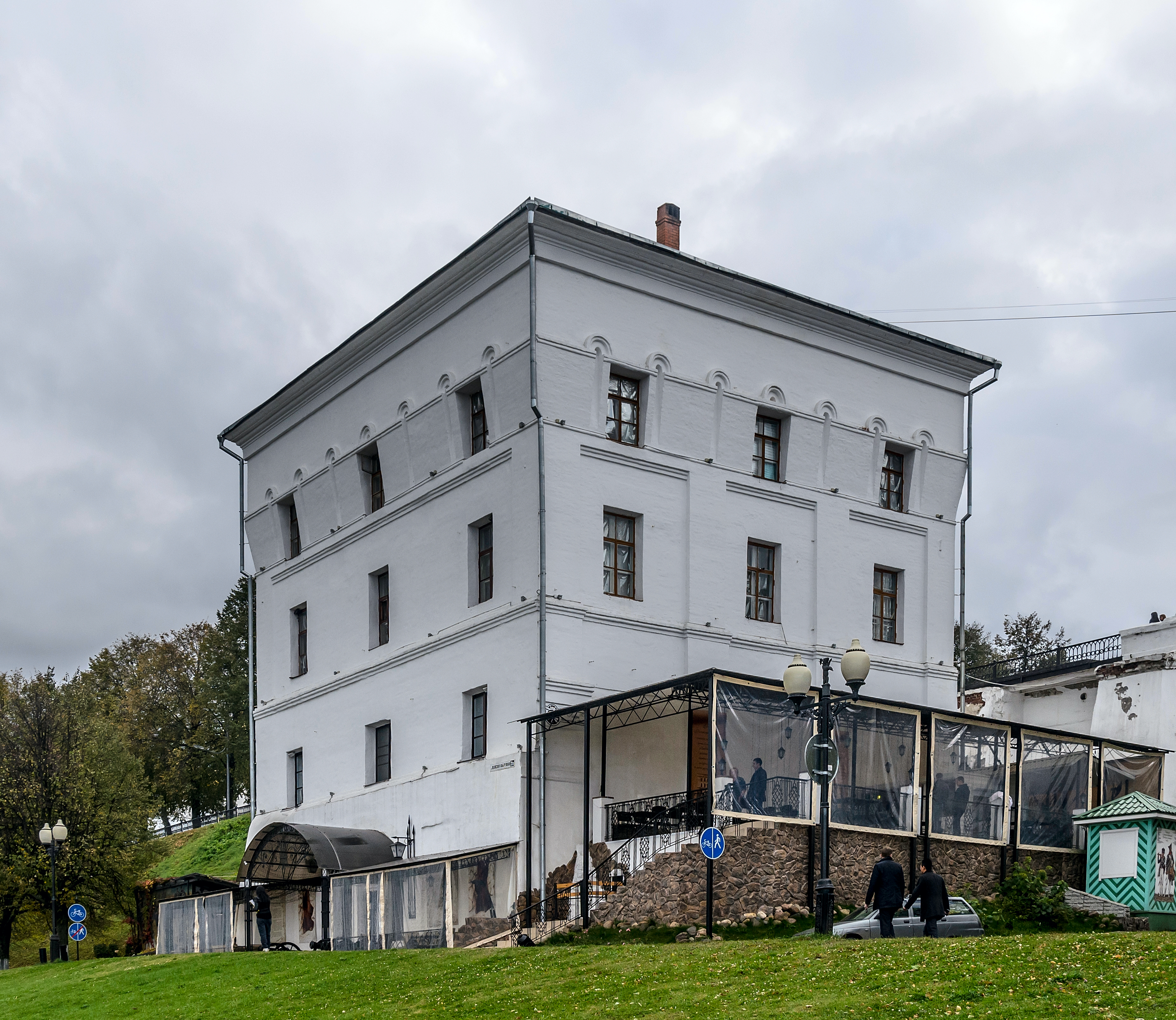
- 57°37′30″N 39°54′05″E
- Location: Yaroslavl, Russia
- Type: fortified tower
- Beginning date: 1658
- Completion date: 1669

Volzhskaya tower (Russian: Волжская башня), or Arsenalnaya tower (Russian: Арсенальная башня), is one of the three surviving towers of the fortifications of the Zemlyanoy town (posad) of Yaroslavl. Initially, in the 16th century, six gated towers and twenty blank wooden towers were built on the ramparts.

== History ==
The tower was built of brick between 1658 and 1669 on the right bank of the Volga River. It has a square floor plan and contains a gateway. It served as the main entrance to the fortified part of the city from the water. Originally it had a barbican. Later, the city arsenal was set up in the tower. At the beginning of the 19th century, the barbican was dismantled.

By the end of the 19th century, the Volga Tower was adapted for a tavern, which was called “The Tower”. Currently, there is a café on the ground floor.

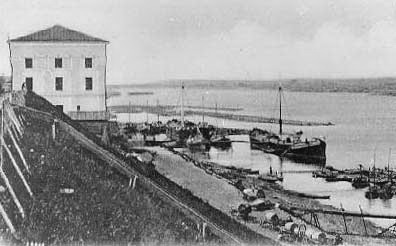

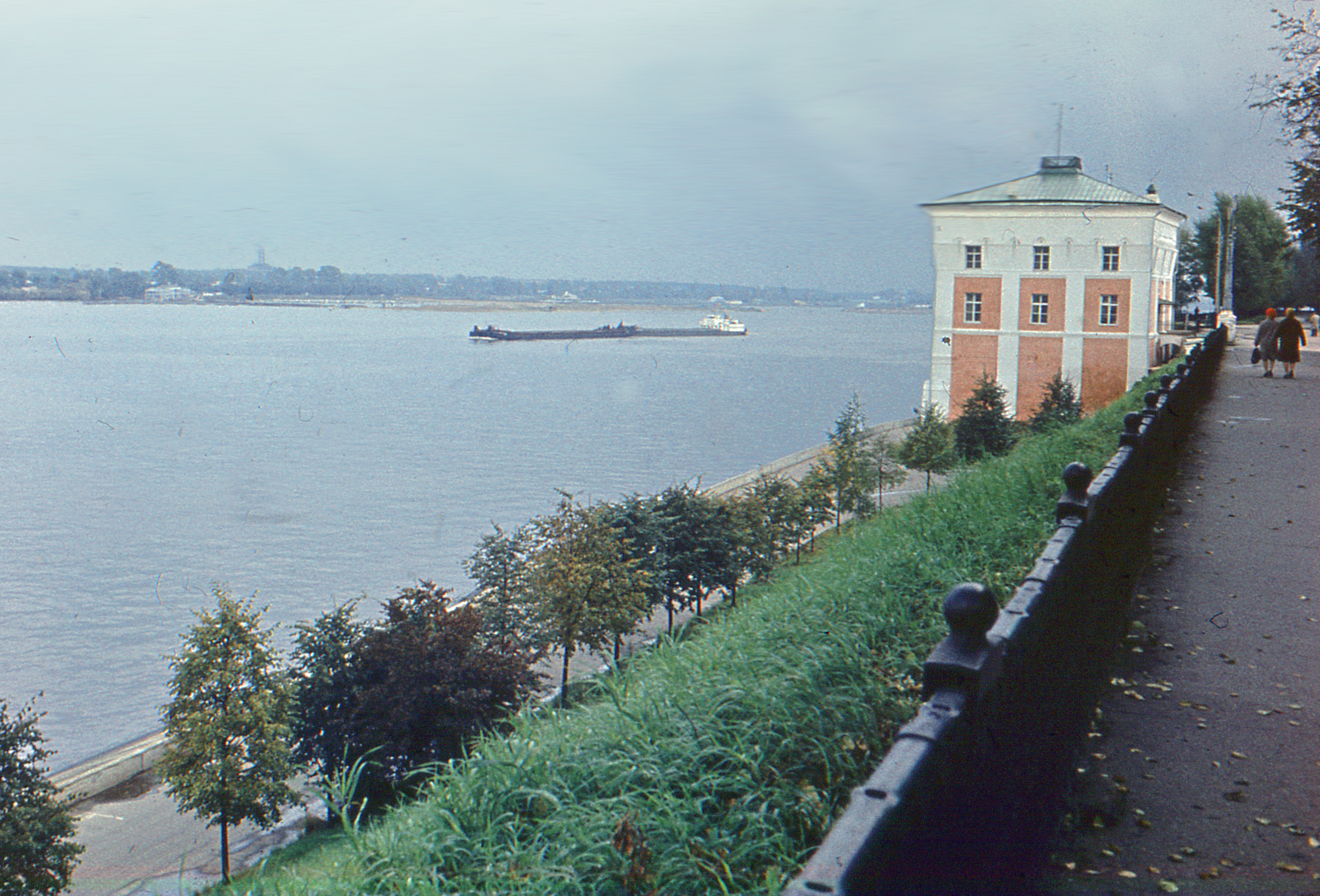

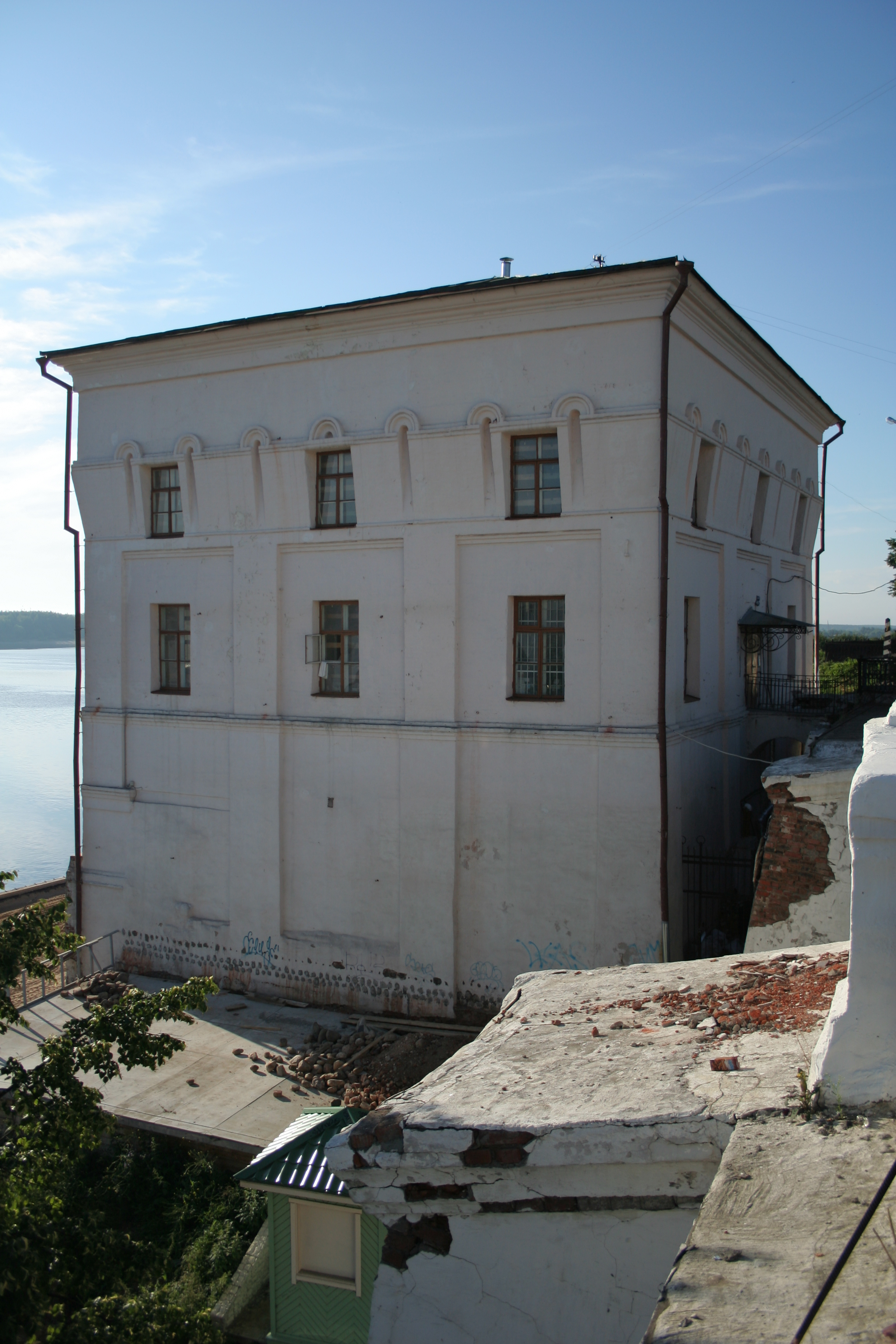

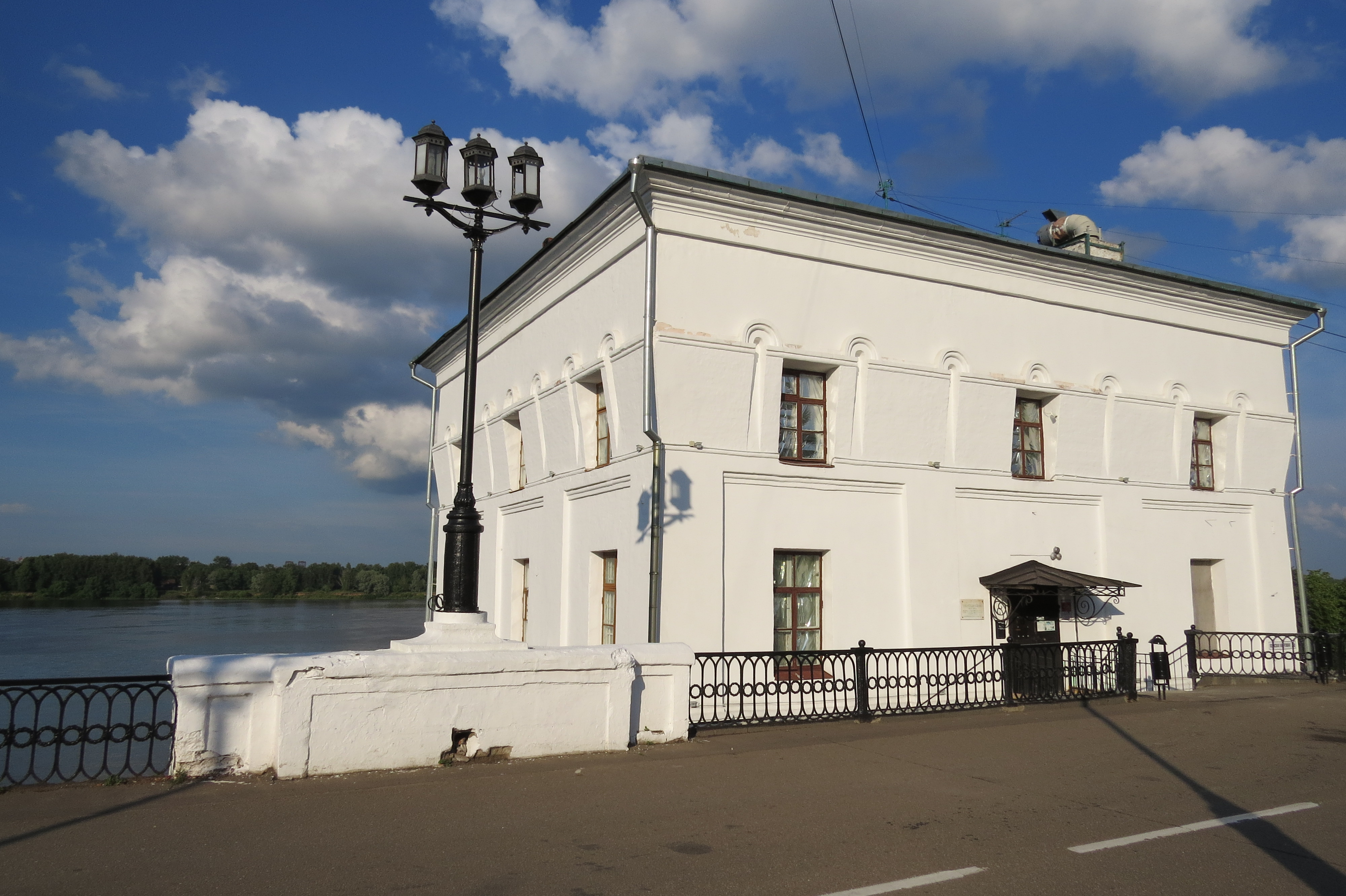

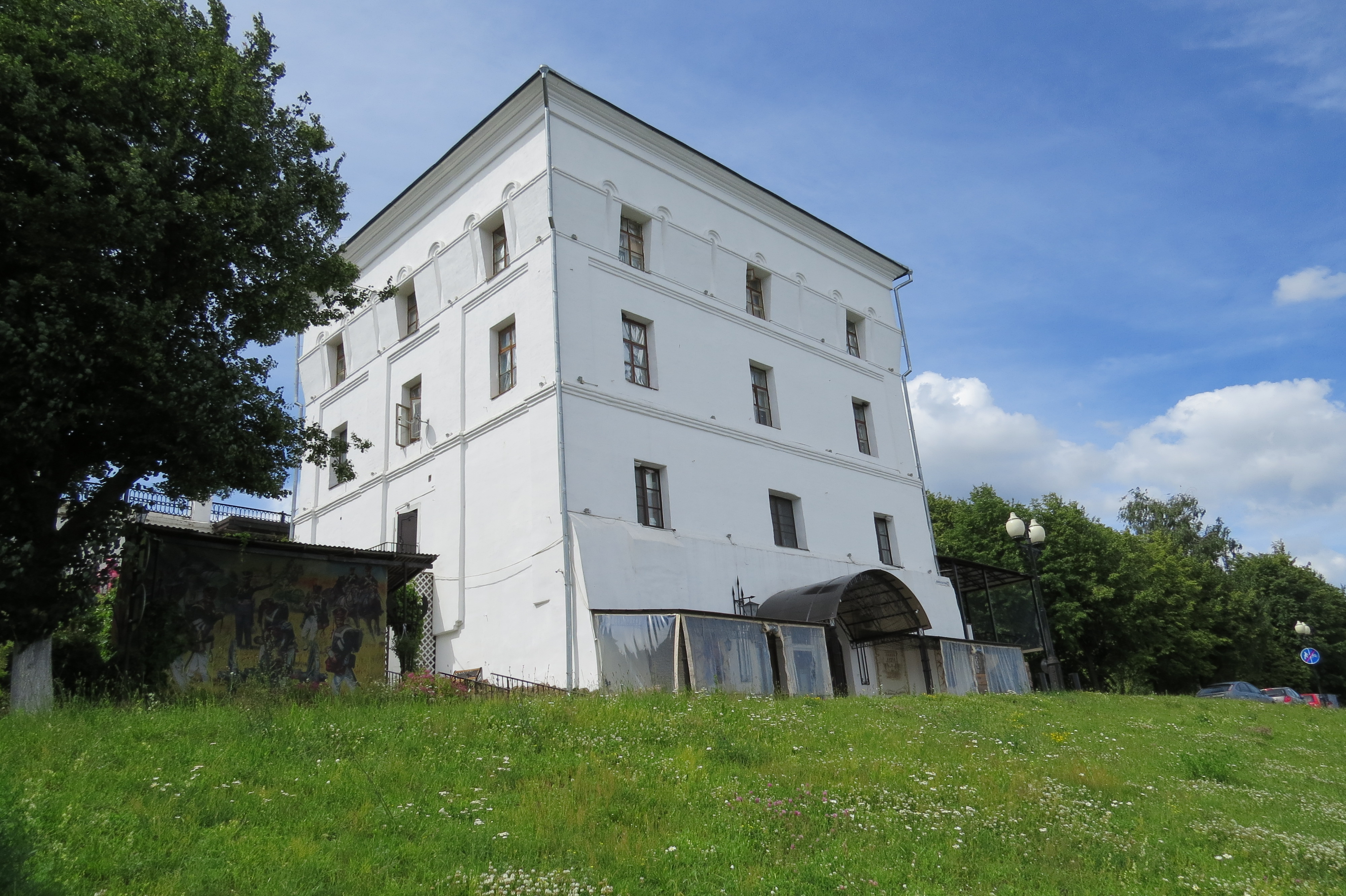
