= Oleg I =

Oleg I may refer to:

- Oleg I of Chernigov (d. 1115)
- Oleg I of Ryazan (d. 1258)
