= Congress of Lutsk =

1429 diplomatic gathering in Lutsk, Grand Duchy of Lithuania

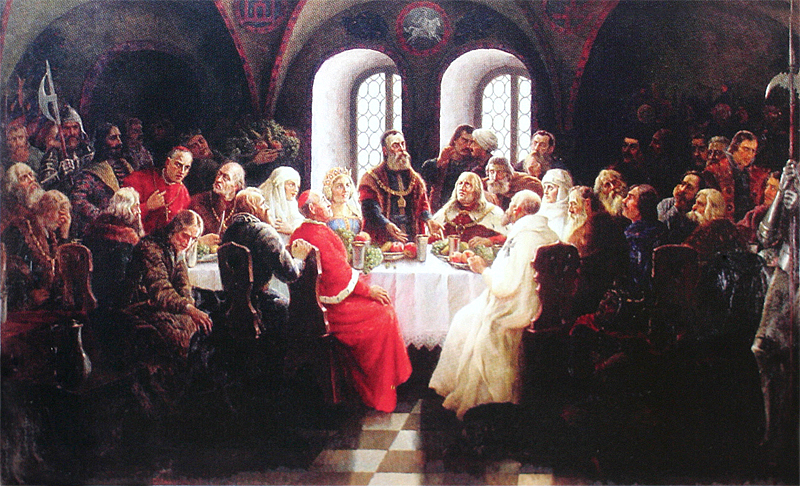
- Date: January 1429
- Location: Lutsk, Grand Duchy of Lithuania

The Congress of Lutsk was a diplomatic gathering held in Lubart's Castle in Lutsk, Grand Duchy of Lithuania over a 13-week period beginning on January 6, 1429. The main topic of discussion was the coronation of Vytautas as the King of Lithuania. Other topics included: the siege of Moldavia, a potential coalition against the Ottoman Empire, the desire for improved relations between Denmark and the Hanseatic League, religious unions and divisions, as well as various economic, trade, and tax-related issues.

== Participants and delegates ==
The congress was hosted by the Grand Duchy of Lithuania: Vytautas, other Lithuanian – Ruthenian aristocrats as well as local religious leaders

Foreign delegates attending the congress included:

- Kingdom of Poland: Jogaila, Bishop of Kraków, Zbigniew Oleśnicki, voivode of Kraków, Jan of Tarnów, and Polish magnates
- Hungary: Future Holy Roman Emperor Sigismund of Luxemburg and his wife Barbara; also representatives of noble German, Czech, Hungarian, and Croatian families
- Danish kingdom: Eric of Pomerania
- Livonian Order: Master of the Order Siegfried Landorf Spanheim and his knights
- Teutonic Knights: Komtur of Balga
- Pope Martin V sent his legate Andrew Dominican
- Byzantine Empire: Delegates of Emperor John VIII Palaiologos
- Grand Duchy of Moscow: Vasily II of Moscow, Metropolitan of Kyiv in Moscow Photius
- Grand Duchy of Tver: Boris of Tver
- Grand Duchy of Ryazan: Ivan III of Ryazan
- Moldavian delegates
- Khans of Volga, Don, and Perekop

== Feasting and political intrigue ==
Guests celebrated, feasted, and hunted until diplomatic negotiations began. Seven hundred barrels of honey, wine, 700 oxen, 1,400 sheep, hundreds of elk, wild boar, and other dishes were consumed daily. Guests also competed in jousting during negotiation breaks.

Working for Vytautas, the Jester Henne spied on Sigismund of Luxemburg under the pretense of entertaining the delegates. The diplomatic meeting is thought to have taken place in the Palace of Lubart's Castle, although it is speculated that it may have taken place instead in the Palace of Vytautas, located near the Dominican Monastery.

== Political proceedings ==
- The Wallachia problem. Hungarians, Turks, and Poles all claimed a right to the land of Moldavia. Under the agreement of 1412, Moldavia had to act on the side of king Sigismund of Luxembourg in the struggle with the Turks. Moldavia, however, failed to follow the agreement. Thus Sigismund suggested that this land be divided between Poland and Hungary.
- The anti-Turkey coalition. Expanding their interests in the Balkans and the basin of the Danube, the monarchs were concerned about the Turkish threat. Although relations between the Ottoman Porte and the Byzantines had been peaceful at times, there was no hope for a peaceful future following the Ottoman-Venetian War of 1422–1430 ending in favor of the Turks and the Ottoman Siege of Constantinople in 1422. Hungarian and German kings made a proposal to Lithuania and Poland to become members of the anti-Turkey coalition. However, the Polish delegation expressed their reluctance to take such a great risk until the coalition was joined by the majority of the states.
- Diplomacy between Denmark and Hansa. Danish king Eric of Pomerania was interested in regulating the relations with Hansa cities. Battles between Denmark and Hansa had exhausted the kingdom. This problem was discussed at the congress but the outcome of the discussion is unknown.
- Religious problems. The Congress was proposed to realize the idea of a union between the Catholic and the Orthodox churches. Sigismund of Luxembourg and the papal legate Andrew supported the union. However, the clergy refused to join the discussion. The split between the Catholic church and the activities of Hussites (Hussite Revolution) in Bohemia were also discussed.

The main aim of the council, a defense strategy to protect Europe from the Ottoman Turks, was not achieved because the Congress was dominated by another event. King Sigismund encouraged the crowning of Vytautas as the King of Lithuania. He was interested in dividing Lithuania and Poland, with a separate kingdom of Lithuania, to reduce the influence of Poland.
