= Fyodor II of Ryazan =

Grand Prince of Ryazan from 1402 to 1427

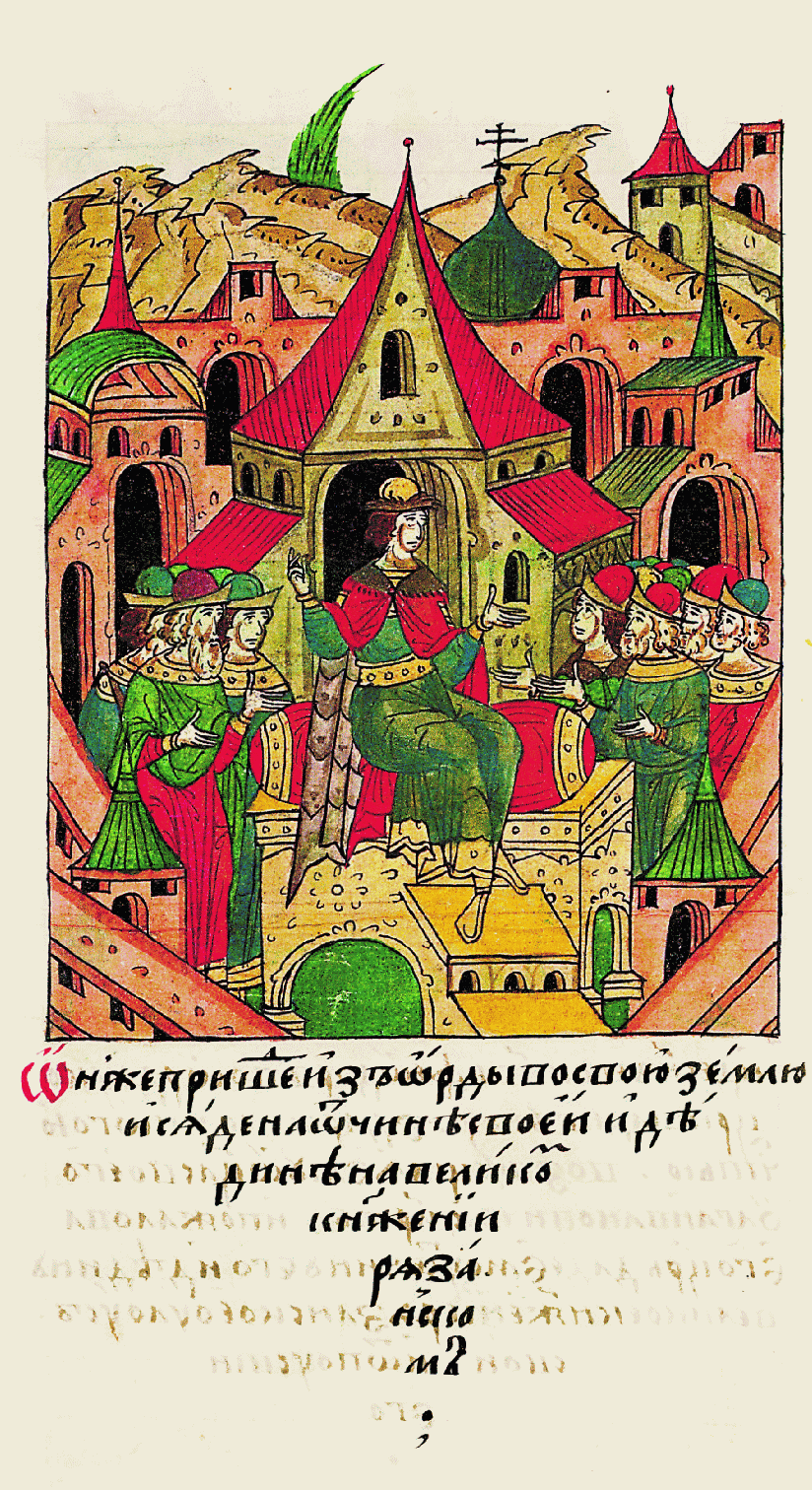
- Depiction of Fyodor II in the Illustrated Chronicle of Ivan the Terrible (16th century)

Grand Prince of Ryazan
- Reign: 1402–1427
- Predecessor: Oleg II
- Successor: Ivan III
- Born: c. 1360; Ryazan
- Died: 1427; Ryazan
- Spouse: Sofia
- Issue: Vasili Fyodorovich; Vasilisa Fyodorovna; Ivan III of Ryazan
- House: Sviatoslavichi
- Father: Oleg II of Ryazan
- Religion: Russian Orthodox

Fyodor Olgovich (Russian: Фёдор Ольгович), also known as Fyodor Olegovich (Russian: Фёдор Олегович), was Grand Prince of Ryazan from 1402 until his death in 1427. He was a son of Oleg II of Ryazan. Fyodor reigned during a period of unrest for the principality, fending off incursions from the Golden Horde. He was defeated and expelled from Ryazan by Ivan Vladimirovich, the prince of Pronsk, in 1408, but in turn defeated Ivan Vladimirovich at the Battle on the Smyadva (Russian: битва на Смядве) later the same year. The two later reconciled. He also agreed a peace treaty with Vasily I of Moscow, and married Vasily's sister Sofia, forming a peaceful relationship with the Grand Principality of Moscow. He was succeeded by his youngest son, Ivan.

== Early life ==
Fyodor Olgovich was born in around 1360, the son of Oleg Ivanovich, the grand prince of Ryazan by his first wife, possibly named Vassa Anastasia Maria Ulyanaz. He was brought up within the court of his father during a period of transition as the principality moved from Slavic paganism to the Russian Orthodox Church. His father was the last prince of Ryazan to take a pagan name. As part of his father's endeavour to create peace with the Principality of Moscow, Fyodor was married in 1385 to Sofia, the daughter of Dmitry Donskoy, the grand prince of Vladimir and Moscow. Such diplomatic marriages were common at the time amongst the rulers of the region, a tradition that Fyodor followed with his own children.

== Reign ==
In 1402, Oleg Ivanovich abdicated and was tonsured by the bishop of Ryazan, Theognostos. He joined the monastery at Solotchinsky, died soon after, and Fyodor became the grand prince. He was quick to foster peace between the principality and its neighbours. Priority amongst them would be his wife's home country. However, the relationship with Moscow was not one of equals. When he rose to the throne in 1402, Fyodor agreed a peace treaty with Donskoy's heir Vasily. The charter included a clause limiting Moscow's interference in Ryazan. In exchange, Fyodor surrendered his right of independent relations with the Grand Duchy of Lithuania, the Golden Horde and other entities with which Moscow had relationships.

Ivan Vladimirovich, the prince of Pronsk, heard of this agreement, which also stipulated that Fyodor was under the protection of the metropolitan and Vasily in his dealings with Pronsk. According to chroniclers of the time, this angered Ivan Vladimirovich. He raised an army and attacked Ryazan, the armies meeting in 1408 on the banks of the Osyotr. According to the chronicles of Tver, Fyodor called upon the support of Moscow and other Russian allies and fielded an overwhelming force of numbers. However, despite this, he suffered a major defeat, with Ivan Vladimirovich taking over the Principality of Ryazan. However, this Fyodor rallied and within the year, at the Battle on the Smyadva River (Russian: битва на Смядве), he defeated Ivan Vladimirovich and retook Ryazan. Soon after, the two princes reconciled and, through the mediation of Vasily, signed a peace treaty recognising each others' legitimacy.

Although this was the last recorded conflict between the principality its neighbours, it was not the only unrest that Fyodor had to address during his reign. Although less than during the period between 1388 and 1402, when the desolation brought by the raids had left a huge mark on the southern lands of the principality, attacks by the Golden Horde continued throughout the century. According to the Nikon Chronicle, they attacked in 1405, 1411 and 1426. He died the year after, in 1427, and was buried in the newly consecrated cathedral in Pereslavl, the first of the royal family of Ryazan to be interred there.

== Family ==
With his wife Sofia, Fyodor had three children. His eldest son, Vasili Fyodorovich, predeceased him, dying in 1407. His daughter Vasilisa Fyodorovna married Ivan Vladimirovich of Pronsk. His youngest son Ivan Fyodorovich succeeded him to the principality at his death.
