= Dmitry Verderevsky =

Russian politician and admiral (1873–1947)

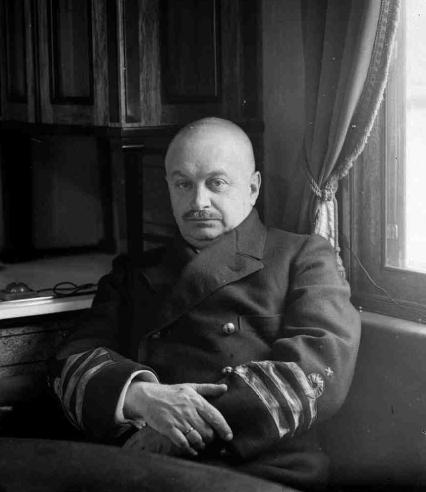
- Verderevsky in 1917

Minister of the Navy of the Russian Republic
- In office 1 September – 25 October 1917
- Minister-Chairman: Alexander Kerensky
- Preceded by: Alexander Kerensky (as Minister of War and Navy of the Russian Provisional Government
- Succeeded by: Nikolai Podvoisky (as People's Commissars for Military and Naval Affairs of the RSFSR)

Personal details
- Born: 4 November 1873 Saint Petersburg, Russian Empire
- Died: 22 August 1947 (aged 73) Paris, France
- Awards: Order of St Vladimir 4th class Order of St. Stanislaus 2nd class Order of St. Anne 2nd class

Military service
- Allegiance: Russian Empire
- Branch/service: Imperial Russian Navy
- Years of service: 1880–1915
- Rank: Rear Admiral
- Commands: Admiral Makarov; Bogatyr
- Battles/wars: World War I

Rear Admiral Dmitry Nikolayevich Verderevsky (Russian: Дмитрий Николаевич Вердеревский, 4 November 1873 – 22 August 1947) was an Imperial Russian Navy officer who served as Minister of the Navy in the Russian Provisional Government in 1917.

== Early life and family ==
Verderevsky was from an ancient noble family. His father Nikolai Verderevsky was a barrister. His mother was Sophia Alexandrova Repins. He had two brothers: Vasily, an army officer and Roman, a navy officer who fought in the siege of Port Arthur. Verderevsky married Elena Mikhailovna Plen (died 1944) and they had one son, Pavel Dmitrievich (1896-1985), an engineer, who lived in exile in France and is buried next to his father.

== Naval career ==
Verderevsky graduated from the Sea Cadet Corps in 1893 and from the naval artillery class in 1898. He moved to the naval reserve in 1900 and was involved in shipbuilding on the Aral Sea in Turkestan. He rejoined the active navy in 1904 on the outbreak of the Russo-Japanese War and commanded a destroyer in the Black Sea Fleet. In 1905 he was gunnery officer on the battleship Petr Velikiy and had a role as a fleet gunnery instructor. He was wounded during the mutiny on the cruiser Pamiat Azova in 1906.

From 1906 to 1909 he worked on the journal Morskoy Sbornik (Naval Review). In 1908 he was senior officer on the Petr Velikiy and squadron gunnery officer in the Baltic Fleet, he also taught gunnery at the Nikolayev Naval Academy.

In 1910-11 he commanded the destroyer General Kondratenko. He took command of the destroyer Novik in 1911, and the cruiser Admiral Makarov in 1914. At the start of World War I he was given a posting ashore coordinating the work on range-finding equipment in Saint Petersburg-based factories. In 1915 he was given command of the cruiser Bogatyr. In 1916 he was made commander of the submarine division of the Baltic Fleet based at Reval and promoted to rear admiral.

== Activity in 1917 ==
After the February Revolution he was made chief of staff of the Baltic Fleet and subsequently fleet commander and assistant to Boris Dudorov, the Assistant Navy Minister of the Provisional Government, but failed to put down a mutiny. In July he was arrested, tried and acquitted of "disclosure of official secrets and disobeying the central authorities". As an admiral with a democratic reputation he was appointed Navy Minister in the Kerensky Government in August.

Many military leaders had a negative attitude to the activities of Verderevsky and General Aleksandr Verkhovsky, the War Minister of the Provisional Government. Their point of view was expressed by General Anton Denikin, who said that the Minister of Marine had utopian initiatives:

"Verderevsky preached that "discipline must be voluntary. We must come to terms with the mass (!) And on the basis of a common love of country to encourage it voluntarily to assume all the burdens of military discipline. It is essential that the discipline is no longer wearing a disagreeable nature of coercion. "

He was an advocate of Russia's withdrawal from the war. On 24 October, in solidarity with the Minister of War Aleksandr Verkhovsky, also an early supporter of an early peace, Verderevsky drafted his resignation, but had not submitted it by the time the October Revolution broke out. On 26 October 1917 he was arrested by the Bolsheviks in the Winter Palace, together with other members of the Provisional Government. The next day, was released on parole. He provided technical guidance on operational fleet actions to defend the country.

== In exile ==
Verderevsky was not involved in the White movement. Initially moving to London in 1918, he settled in Paris in 1920 and was an active Freemason. After World War II he became reconciled with the Soviets and was granted Soviet citizenship in 1946. He was criticised for this by fellow exile Roman Gul. Verderevsky is buried in Sainte-Geneviève-des-Bois Russian Cemetery.

== Family ==
Spouse: Elena Mikhailovna Plen (14.12.1871–12.4.1944, Potsdam).

Issue:

- Pavel (16.07.1896–07.02.1985, Paris), was an engineer.
- Dmitry (08.07.1903, Tashkent –30.10.1974, Chișinău) was a prominent Soviet plant patologist, members of the Academy of Sciences of Moldova Soviet Republic.
- Elena (1900-1978), was a university teacher based in Canada.

== See also ==
- Verderevsky family

Political offices
Preceded by Alexander Kerensky (as Minister of War and the Navy)	Minister of the Navy of the Russian Provisional Government; 30 August 1917 – 25 October 1917	Succeeded by Vacant
