= Lyubutsk =

Russian fortress in Kaluga Oblast

Coordinates: 54.4°N 36.9°E

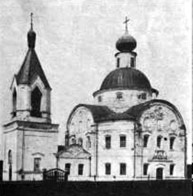
The Trinity Church in Lyubutsk

Lyubutsk (Lyubutsk, Lyubutesk, Russian: Любутск) was a Russian fortress, located about 4 kilometres (2.5 mi) below the confluence the Oka River with Dugna in the present-day Kaluga Oblast. Its name derives from a rivulet flowing on northern and eastern sides of the city.

Initially Lyubutsk was part of the Principality of Bryansk. In the 14th century, the city was acquired by the Grand Duchy of Lithuania. The town was mentioned in 1372 when Algirdas of Lithuania and Mikhail II of Tver marched against Dmitry Donskoy, Grand Duke of Moscow, who managed to stop the joint army. After a period of stand off, Algirdas and Dmitry reached an agreement and concluded the Treaty of Lyubutsk.

In 1408, Lyubustk became a property of Vladimir the Bold. However, in 1473 was again under the rule of Lithuania. In 1460 Lyubutsk was mentioned as a settlement reached by Akhmat Khan during his attack on Lithuania and Moscow. Finally, the city came under the rule of Moscow after the 1503 truce ending the second Muscovite–Lithuanian War. Tsar Ivan III bequeathed the fortress to his son Andrey of Staritsa. In the 16th century Lyubutsk ceased to be a fortress and became a posad. In 1566 Lyubutsk was mentioned as a mere village.
