= Muscovite–Volga Bulgars war (1376) =

Grand Duchy of Moscow-Volga Bulgars War (1376)
- Part of Russo-Horde Wars
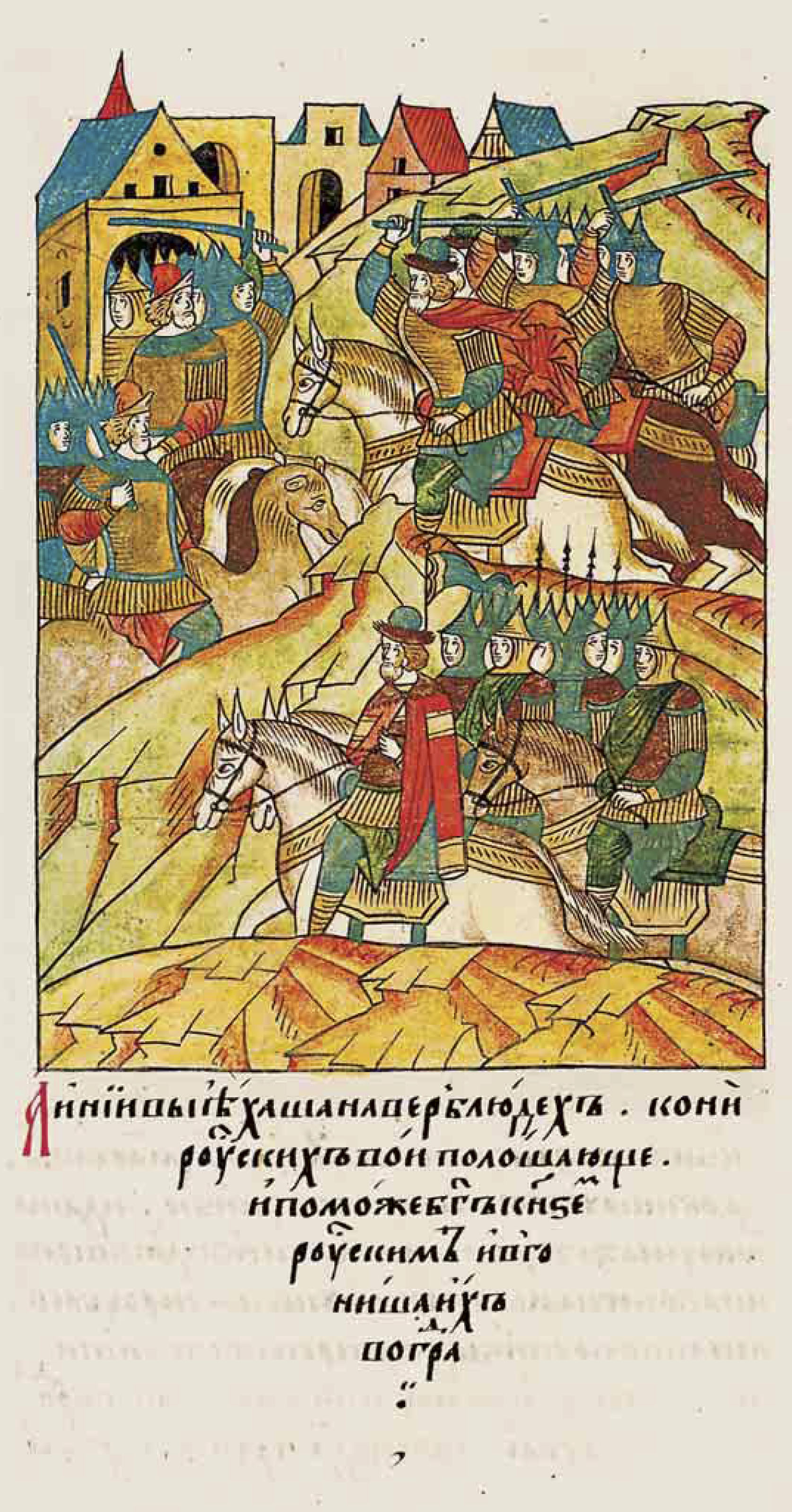
- Campaign against Kazan (actually Bulgar) in 1376. Miniature from the Russian Facial Chronicle of the 16th century.
| Date | March 16, 1376 |
| Location | Volga Bulgaria |
| Result | Muscovite-Suzdalian victory: Tribute payment by Bulgaria |

Belligerents
| Grand Duchy of Moscow | Volga Bulgaria (Golden Horde) |

Commanders and leaders
| Dmitry Mikhailovich Bobrok Volynsky; Vasiliy Kirdyapa; Ivan Dmitriyevich | Hassan Khan; Muhammad Sultan (Sultan Mahmat) |

Strength
| Unknown | Unknown |

Casualties and losses
| Unknown | Heavy losses, tribute of 5,000 rubles paid |

The Grand Duchy of Moscow-Volga Bulgars War of 1376 was organized by princes Dmitry Donskoy of Muscovy, and Dmitry Konstantinovich of Nizhny Novgorod-Suzdal. The combined Muscovite–Suzdalian army was led by Moscow Governor Dmitry Mikhailovich Bobrok Volynsky, and Dmitry of Suzdal's sons Vasily and Ivan Dmitriyevich. Volga Bulgaria, which was at the time an ulus of the Golden Horde (who had converted to Islam in 1313), was ruled by emir Hassan Khan (in Rus' chronicles Assan) and Horde protégé Muhammad Sultan (Sultan Mahmat).

== Background ==
In 1364, ongoing raids perpetrated by the Mongol-Tatars on Nizhny Novgorod land forced Prince Dmitry Konstantinovich of Nizhny Novgorod-Suzdal to ally with and seek assistance from Dmitri Ivanovich of Moscow. Certain outposts for these raids served the Bulgar Ulus.

== Campaign ==
During the campaign, many villages in Volga Bulgaria were burned and large numbers were slaughtered.

On March 16, the Muscovite–Suzdalian army invaded Volga Bulgaria, leading Hasan Khan to mount a defense. The Bulgars rode camels at this time. The city walls were breached by Muscovite–Suzdalian fire-power. However, according to the chronicler, Muscovite–Suzdalian forces were also under heavy assault and faced significant opposition. Once the walls were breached, the Bulgar army forces were quickly defeated. Many Bulgars fled into the city and hid behind the walls. Hasan Khan ordered a 5,000 ruble payment (2,000 to soldiers and 3,000 to princes and magistrates) to end the attack.
