= Bobrok =

Russian boyar and general (died after 1389)

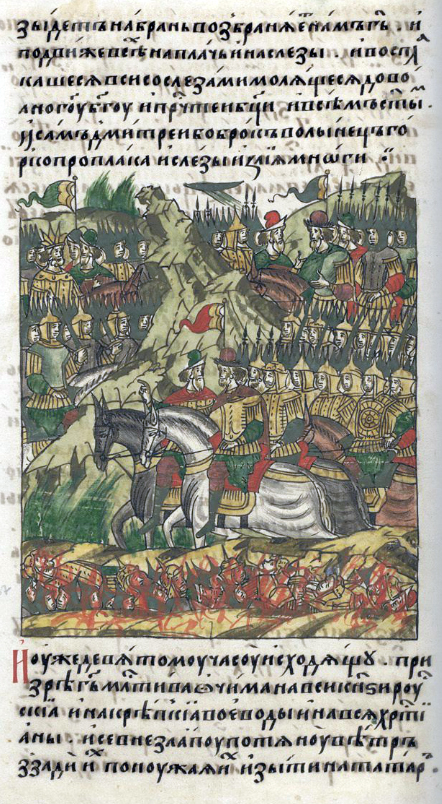
Bobrok's ambush regiment, miniature from the Illustrated Chronicle of Ivan the Terrible (16th century).

Prince Dmitry Mikhailovich Bobrok Volynsky (Russian: Дмитрий Михайлович Боброк Волынский; died after 1389), also known simply as Bobrok (lit. 'little beaver'), was a Russian general, boyar, and the brother-in-law of Dmitry I of Moscow. His military prowess is glorified in the 15th-century Tale of the Rout of Mamai.

== Life ==
Bobrok's parentage is the subject of a long-running dispute. Most sources call him a Volhynian princeling. He could have been a junior member of the House of Ostrogski, of Rurikid stock, or a grandson of Gediminas of Lithuania, probably one of Karijotas's sons. It has also been speculated that he held the village of Bobrka on the Boberka River as a fief from Liubartas.

Bobrok was one of the first Lithuanian princes to enter the Muscovite service. He led the Muscovite army against Oleg II of Ryazan in 1371 and successfully raided Volga Bulgaria in 1376. He was in charge of the conquest of Severia in 1379 and was in command of a regiment lying in ambush during the great Battle of Kulikovo in 1380.

Bobrok is not mentioned in any sources after 1389. Valentin Yanin has speculated that he took the tonsure after his son had been killed by a fall from a horse. The Bobrenev Monastery in Kolomna claims Bobrok as its founder. Yanin has argued that St. Michael of Klopsk was his son or grandson. The Volynsky boyar family also claims patrilineal descent from Bobrok.

== Sources ==
- "Боброков-Волынский, Димитрий Михайлович" . Brockhaus and Efron Encyclopedic Dictionary (in Russian). 1906.
