= Gleb Vladimirovich of Ryazan =

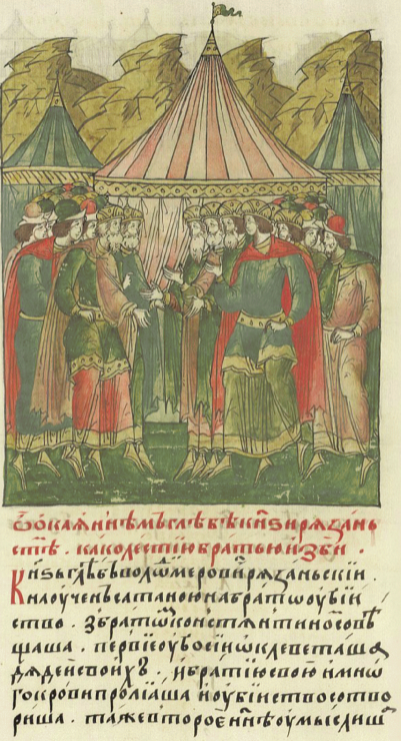
Congress in Isady. Gleb and Konstantin greet the princes. Miniature from the Illustrated Chronicle of Ivan the Terrible, 16th century.

Gleb Vladimirovich (Russian: Глеб Владимирович; died 1219) was an appanage prince of Ryazan. He is remembered in history as an instigator of a civil war in the principality.

== Life ==
He was the eldest of the four sons of Vladimir Glebovich of Ryazan. He is first mentioned in 1195, when he attended the wedding of Konstantin Vsevolodovich. The following year, he sided with his father-in-law, Davyd Rostislavich and participated in the campaign against Chernigov and narrowly escaped capture.

In 1207, together with his brother Oleg, he slandered his uncles Roman and Sviatoslav Glebovich before Vsevolod the Big Nest. In response, his uncles were arrested and imprisoned. He also took part, together with Vsevolod, in the sacking of Pronsk. The following year, he and his brothers marched to Pronsk against Davyd Yuryevich of Murom, who was forced to flee. Gleb and his brother Oleg received Pronsk, but Gleb was not satisfied with this arrangement. In 1209, he decided to add Ryazan to his possessions as well, but this undertaking failed.

In a bid for the throne, in 1217 he lured his brothers to a feast at Isady and executed them all, using Cuman mercenaries. Ousted by popular revolt, he was exiled to the Wild Fields. In 1218, he unsuccessfully besieged Ingar Ingarovich in Ryazan and fled to the steppe again in the following year. He soon died, after going insane.

== In popular culture ==
He is a minor antagonist (and collaborator with the Tatars) during the Mongol invasions in the historical novel Batu-Khan of Soviet author V. Jan.

== Sources ==
- "Глеб Владимирович, князь рязанский" . Brockhaus and Efron Encyclopedic Dictionary (in Russian). 1906.
- Boguslavsky, Vladimir V.; Kuksina, Elena I. (2001). "Глеб Владимирович". Славянская энциклопедия. Киевская Русь — Московия. Т. 1: А–М (in Russian). Moskva: ОЛМА Медиа Групп. p. 280. ISBN 9785224022502.
