= Posad people =

Class of medieval East Slavic lands

Posad People (Black Townspeople, Townspeople, Civilians) were a class of medieval (feudal) East Slavic lands (Kievan Rus, Grand Duchy of Moscow, Russian Tsardom, etc.), whose duties were to bear the tax (black people), that is, pay monetary and natural taxes, as well as perform numerous duties.

The name of the handicraft and commercial population of the cities – "posad people" – comes from the word "posad". When writing applications (petitions) to orders, the townspeople and Peasants were written not as Kholops, but as "slaves and orphans". The trade and craft population of cities (podols, posads, hundreds) created their own territorial and professional associations (organizations of Artisans, such as workshops). The term has first been attested in written sources in the 15th century, but some scholars have extrapolated that they must have already existed for some time before then.

== History ==
=== Kievan Rus' ===
The taxable population was divided according to:

- Black slobodas;
- Black hundreds.

The townspeople settled in the black Slobodas, supplying various supplies to the royal palace and working for the palace needs. The tax was paid locally and from the craft. The obligation was communal. Tax and duties were distributed by the community. The tax was paid from the number of households, and not from the number of people. In the event a person left the settlement, the community had to continue to pay tax for him.

=== Muscovy ===
The ordinary townspeople who were engaged in petty trade, crafts and trades were reduced to the black hundreds. Each black hundred made up a self-governing society with elected heads and Sotniks. Until the middle of the 17th century, the so–called white settlements existed in the cities.

The Posad population was personally free, but the state, interested in the proper receipt of payments, sought to attach taxpayers to the posad. Therefore, for unauthorized departure from the posad, even for marrying a girl from another posad, they were punished with the death penalty. In 1649, the townspeople were forbidden to sell and mortgage their yards, barns, cellars, and so on.

On the basis of property (like all estates of the Russian state), the townspeople were divided into the best, middle and young people.

Rights were given to the best and the middle. For example, the townspeople were allowed to keep a drink for various solemn occasions.

The land under the posads belonged to the community, but not to private individuals. Complaints were submitted on behalf of the entire community. The offense inflicted on the townspeople was considered the offense of the entire community.

Posad people were divided into hundreds and tens. The order was observed by the elected sotsky, fiftsky and tensky. Under Ivan the Terrible, the posad had their own elected administration and court. In the 17th century, this system was replaced by zemstvo huts. In the zemstvo hut there were:

- Zemsky headman;
- Stall tax collector;
- Zemsky tax collectors.

Zemstvo elders and tax collectors were elected for one year – from 1 September. In some cities, in addition to the zemstvo elders, there were also favorite judges. Favorite judges dealt with property matters between the townspeople, except for criminal cases.

Customs heads and tax collectors were elected to collect trade revenues. Sometimes customs heads were appointed from Moscow.

After the Time of Troubles, the township communities began to collapse. Posad people began to enroll in Peasants or slaves. Walking people began to open shops, barns, cellars in the estates, without paying taxes. Since 1649, everyone living in the posad (even temporarily) was required to sign up for tax. All those who escaped from the posad had to return to their posad.

From the end of the 18th century, the townspeople began to be called burghers, although the name was sometimes used as townspeople.

The memory of the estate is preserved in the toponymy of some cities of Russia, where it is immortalized in the names of the streets:

- Posadskaya Street in Yekaterinburg;
- 1st and 2nd Posad Streets in Orel;
- Bolshaya Posadskaya and Malaya Posadskaya Streets in Saint Petersburg;
- Posadskaya Street in Ufa.

== See also ==
- Posad

== Sources ==
- Posad // Small Encyclopedic Dictionary of Brockhaus and Efron: In 4 Volumes – Saint Petersburg, 1907–1909
- Posad People // Brockhaus and Efron Encyclopedic Dictionary: In 86 Volumes (82 Volumes and 4 Additional Volumes) – Saint Petersburg, 1890–1907
- Mykola Kostomarov. Essay on the Trade of the Moscow State in the 16th and 17th Centuries. Saint Petersburg. At Nikolai Tiblen's Printing House and Company, 1862. Pages 146–153
