= Principality of Pronsk =

Russian principality (1129–1503)

Principality of Pronsk Пронское княжество (Russian)
- 1129–1503
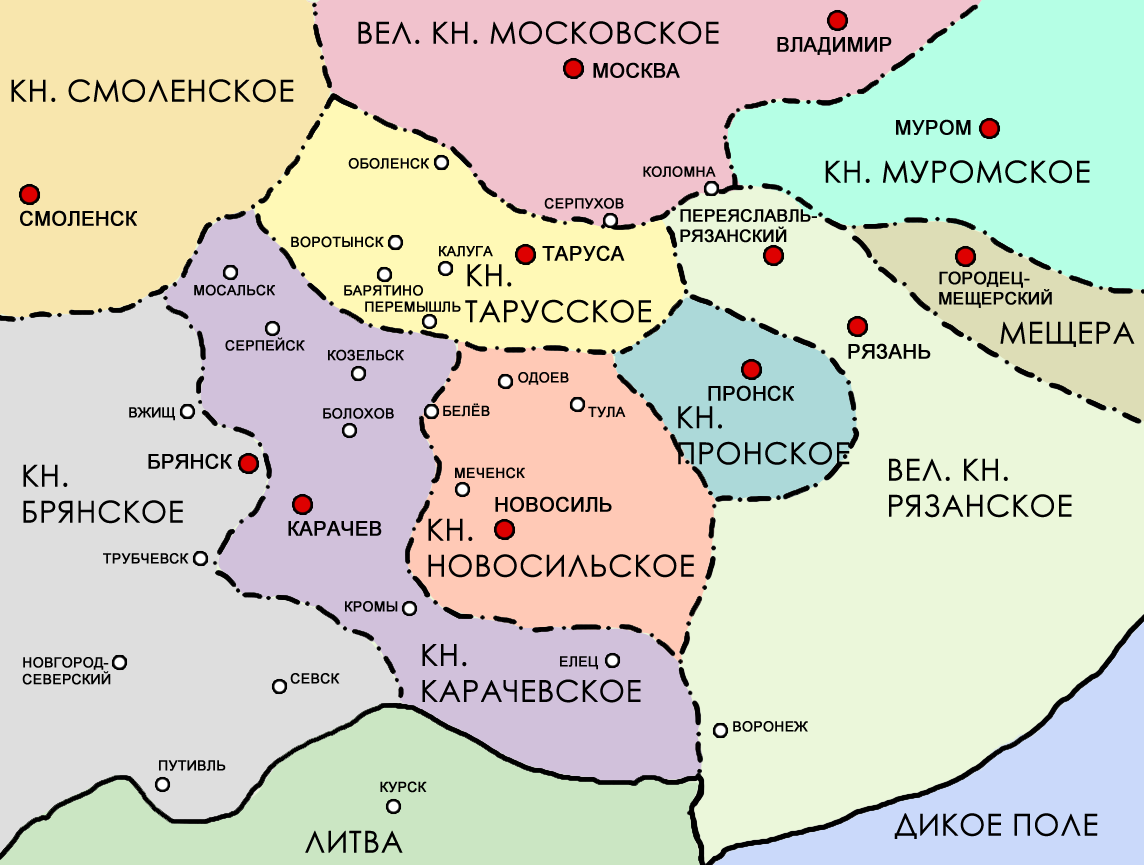
- Russian principalities in the 14th–15th century
- Status: Principality
- Capital: Pronsk
- Common languages: Russian
- Religion: Russian Orthodoxy
- Government: Monarchy
- Prince
  - 1129–1143: Rostislav Yaroslavich (first)
- History
  - Established: 1129
  - Disestablished: 1503
- Today part of: Russia

The Principality of Pronsk (Russian: Пронское княжество, romanized: Pronskoye knyazhestvo) was a Russian appanage principality. It belonged to the Principality of Ryazan. It existed from the 12th to 15th centuries with its center at Pronsk.

== History ==
The Principality of Pronsk existed as an appanage principality of the Principality of Ryazan and frequently changed hands between the different branches of the Ryazan sub-dynasty of Rurikids.

In 1427, the prince of Pronsk, Ivan Vladimirovich, went into Lithuanian service. The Pronsk principality was annexed to the Ryazan principality in 1483 during the regency of Anna of Ryazan, following frequent visits to her brother Ivan III in Moscow and with his agreement. In the early 16th century, the princes of Pronsk went into the service of Ivan III, the grand prince of Moscow. The appanages of Ryazan along with a third of its territory were passed to him in 1503 following the death of the appanage prince Fyodor Vasilyevich, his nephew, and were incorporated into the centralized Russian state.

Following another war with Lithuania, a truce was concluded on 25 March 1503 between Ivan III and Alexander Jagiellon of Lithuania. Alexander recognized Ivan III's conquests, and his control of lands including Moscow, Novgorod, Ryazan, Pskov, Pronsk, and others, while Chernigov, Starodub, and 17 other cities were ceded to Moscow. The treaty was signed in the name of Ivan III, sovereign of all Russia, his son Vasily II, and the rest of his children.

== List of princes ==
From 1129, the princes of Pronsk descended from the Sviatoslavichi branch of Rurikids in Chernigov:

- Rostislav Yaroslavich (1129–1143)
- Davyd Sviatoslavich (1143–1147)
- Roman Glebovich (?–1177)
- Vladimir Glebovich (1180–1186)
- Vsevolod Glebovich (1180–1207)
- Sviatoslav Glebovich (1180–1207)
- Gleb Vladimirovich (1207–1217)
- Mikhail Vsevolodovich (1207–1217)
- Vsevolod Mikhailovich (1217–1237)
- Yaroslav Romanovich (1270–1294)
- Konstantin Romanovich (1294–1299)
- Ivan Yaroslavich (1299–1308)
- Aleksandr Mikhailovich (?–1339)
- Yaroslav-Dmitry Aleksandrovich (1340–1342)
- Vasily Aleksandrovich (1342–1344)
- Ivan Aleksandrovich (1344–1351)
- Vladimir Dmitrievich (?–1372)
- Danila Vladimirovich (1372–1378)
- Ivan Vladimirovich (1378–1430)

== See also ==
- Family tree of Russian monarchs
- Bibliography of Russian history
