= Vasily Konstantinovich =

Prince of Ryazan

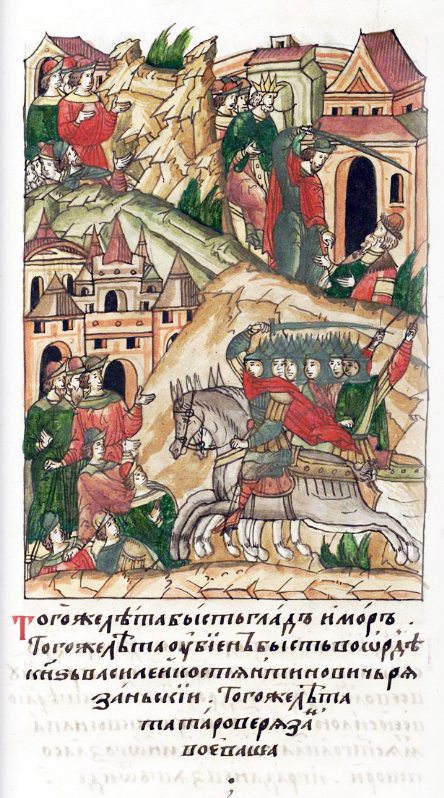

Vasily Konstantinovich (Russian: Василий Константинович) (died 1308) was the Prince of Ryazan in 1301–1308, son of Konstantin Romanovich.

The only recorded mentioning of Vasily Konstantinovich dates back to 1308, when he was killed by the Mongols for reasons unknown during his visit to the Golden Horde. It appears that Vasily Konstantinovich ruled over the Principality of Ryazan, while his father Konstantin Romanovich was being held in Moscow against his will (1301–1306). Upon the death of his father in 1306, he managed to keep his power despite the claims from Ivan Yaroslavich and Mikhail Yaroslavich (rulers of Pronsk). It is believed that the princes of Pronsk were somehow involved in the killing of Vasily Konstantinovich by the Mongols.
