= Pronsk, Pronsky District, Ryazan Oblast =

Pronsk Пронск
- Urban-type settlement
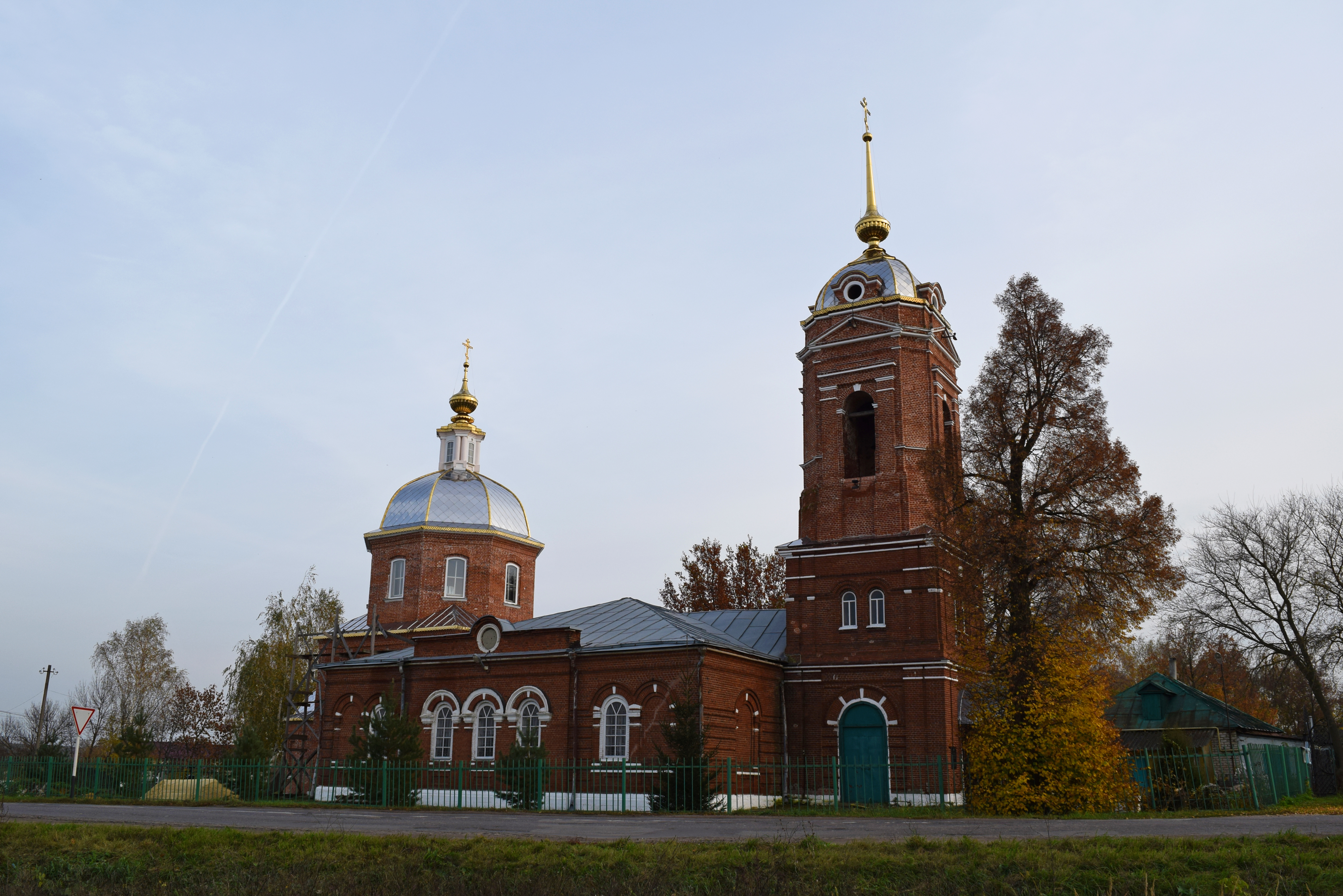
- Church of the Archangel Michael

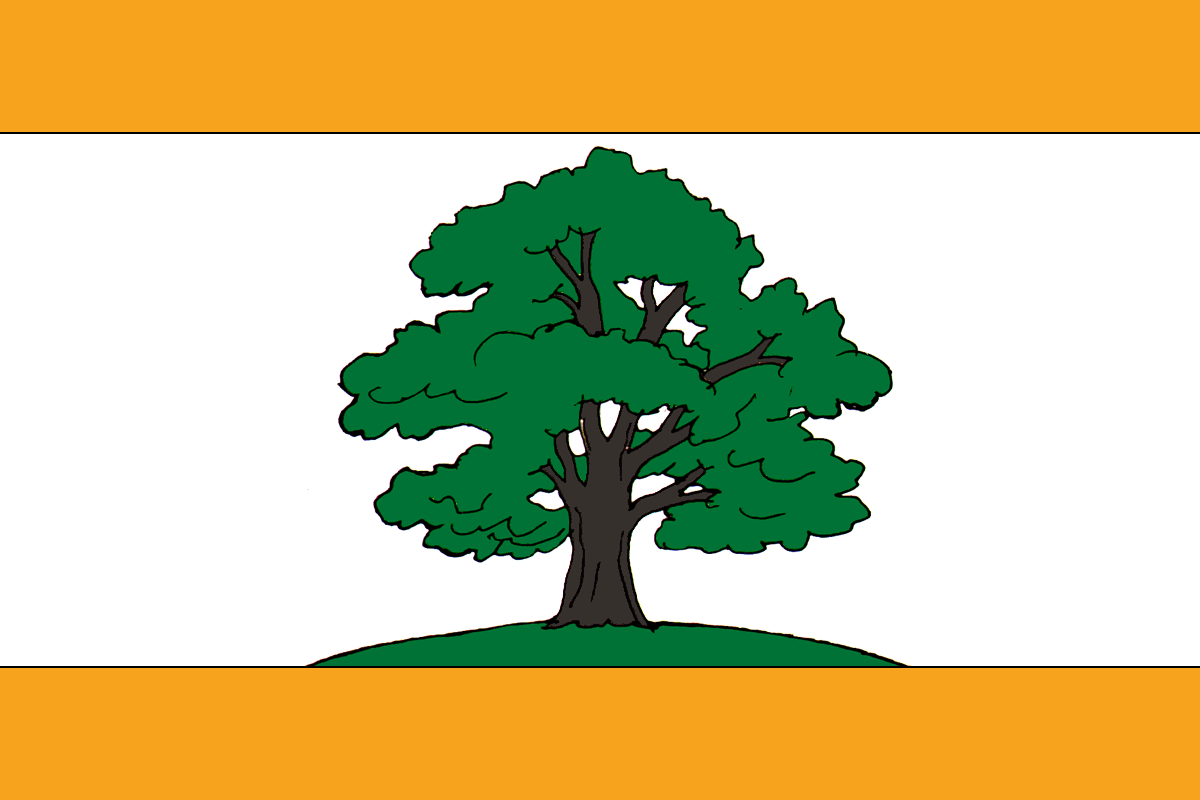
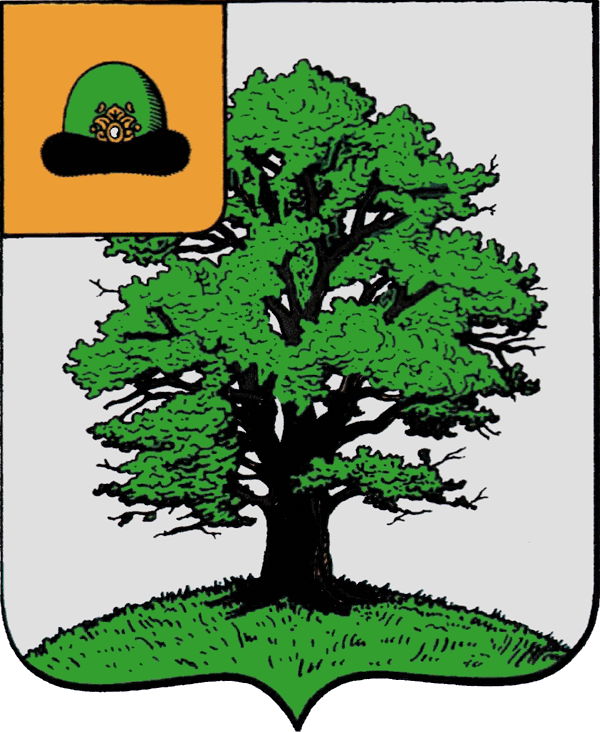
- Flag Coat of arms
- Interactive map of Pronsk
- Location of Pronsk Pronsk (Ryazan Oblast)
- Coordinates: 54°07′N 39°37′E
- Country: Russia
- Federal subject: Ryazan Oblast
- Administrative district: Pronsky District

Population (2010 Census)
  - Total: 3,943
  - Estimate (2023): 4,757 (+20.6%)
- Time zone: UTC+3 (MSK)
- Postal code: 391140
- OKTMO ID: 61625151051

Pronsk (Russian: Пронск) is an urban locality (an urban-type settlement) and the administrative center of Pronsky District of Ryazan Oblast, Russia. Population: 3,943 (2010 census); 4,330 (2002 census); 5,105 (1989 Soviet census).

== History ==
Pronsk was first attested in chronicles in 1186. After Old Ryazan was destroyed by the Mongols, Pronsk remained the most prosperous town in the vicinity and long competed with Pereslavl-Ryazansky (now Ryazan) for the title of the most important center of the powerful Principality of Ryazan. Several times the local dynasty of princes assumed the throne in Ryazan. After the principality was absorbed by Muscovy in the early 16th century, one branch the princely family settled in the Polish–Lithuanian Commonwealth. Another branch was prominent in Muscovite politics until the end of the century.

The settlement lies on the banks of the Pronya River, after which it takes the name. It is located in a relatively hilly part of the country and consists mainly of farm houses and fields. The road Nizhny Arkhangelsky is an old cobble-stone pathway leading from the main highway through the farm houses (dachas) onto the river. On the opposing side is a large church, which serves as a central point in the religious life of the people of Pronsk. The settlement has one bar and a restaurant located on Nizhny Arkhangelsky.
