= Ivan III of Ryazan =

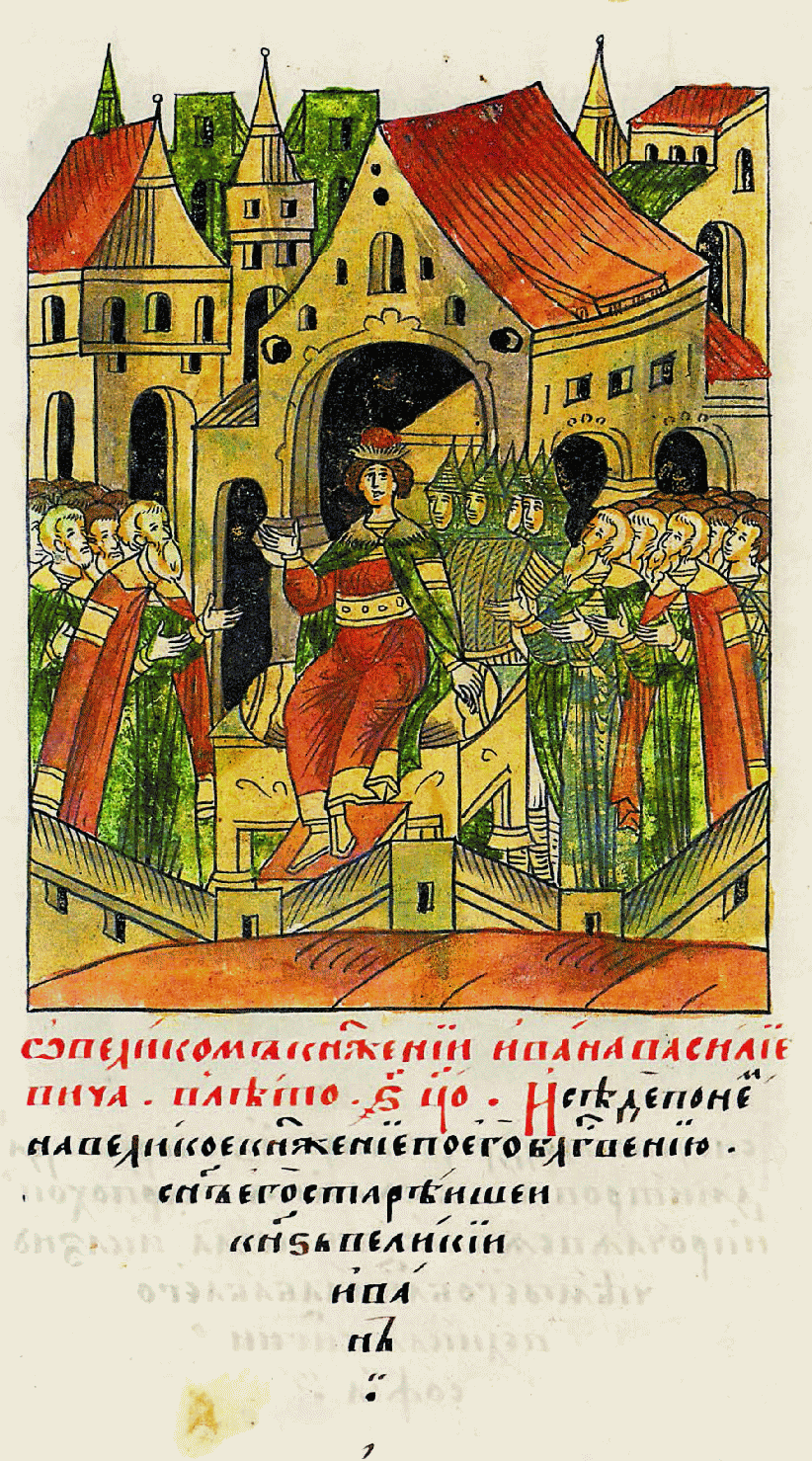
- The enthronement of Ivan III (from the Лицево́й летопи́сный свод)

Grand Prince of Ryazan
- Reign: 1427 – 1456
- Predecessor: Grand Prince Fyodor II of Ryazan
- Successor: Grand Prince Vasily of Ryazan
- Born: 1395; Ryazan
- Died: 1456 (aged 60–61); Ryazan
- Spouse: Grand Princess Anna
- Issue: Grand Prince Vasily Ivanovich; Feodosiya Ivanovna
- House: House of Ryazan, Sviatoslavichi
- Father: Fyodor II of Ryazan
- Mother: Sofia Dmitriyevna
- Religion: Christian, Russian Orthodoxy

Ivan III or Ivan Fyodorovich (Russian: Ива́н Фёдорович) was the Grand Prince of Ryazan (1427–1456) and younger son of Grand Prince Fyodor II of Ryazan. During his reign, he retained good diplomatic relationships with both the Grand Duchies of Lithuania and Moscow. He signed treaties with both Vytautas of Lithuania and Vasily II of Moscow, and sent his children to the court in Moscow for safety. Towards the end of his life, he took monastic vows and was succeeded by his eight-year-old son, Vasily.

== Biography ==
Ivan was the younger son of Fyodor II of Ryazan, but he became first in line to the throne after the death of his brother in 1407. His mother was Sofia, the daughter of Dmitry Donskoy.

On the death of his father in 1427, Ivan became Grand Prince. He kept good relationships with his large and powerful neighbours. In 1429, he attended the Congress of Lutsk and made Ryazan a vassal of the Grand Duchy of Lithuania under Vytautas. He signed a peace treaty with Vasily II of Moscow in 1447 and married his son and heir to Vasily's daughter. Near to his death he sent his two children to the court in Moscow for safety. It was during Ivan's reign that coins from Ryazan started to include the name of the grand prince.

With his wife Anna he had two sons, Peter and Vasily, and a daughter, Feodosiya. In 1456 he took the monastic vows under the name Iona and soon afterwards died. His eight-year-old son Vasily succeeded him but remained in the court of Vasily II, not returning to Ryazan until 1463.

Regnal titles
| Preceded by Fyodor II | Grand Prince of Ryazan; 1427–1456 | Succeeded by Vasily |
