= Oleg I of Ryazan =

Oleg I Ingvarevich the Red, or the Handsome, was Prince of Ryazan from 1252 to 1258.
