= Posad =

Type of East Slavic settlement

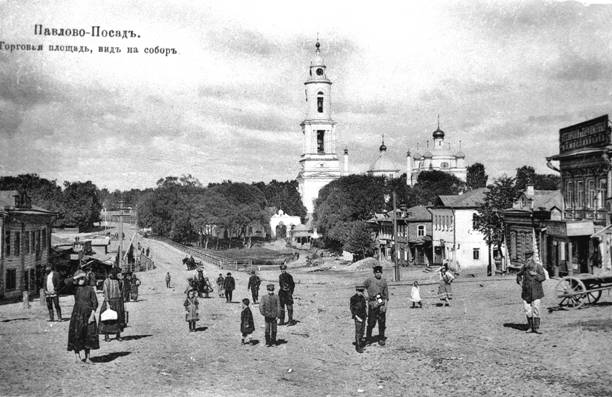
Market Square in Pavlovsky Posad near Moscow, circa 1900.

A posad (Russian and Ukrainian: посад, Belarusian: пасад, romanized: pasad) was a type of settlement in East Slavic lands between the 9th to 15th centuries, it was often surrounded by ramparts and a moat, adjoining a town or a kremlin, but outside of it, or adjoining a monastery. The term is derived from the Slavic prefix po- ('little') and sadъ, 'planted area, garden.' The posad was inhabited by craftsmen and merchants and was its own distinct community, separate from the city it adjoined. Some posads developed into towns, such as Pavlovsky Posad and Sergiev Posad.

During the 1920s administrative territorial reform in the Soviet Union, posads were converted into urban-type settlements.

== History ==
The posad was the center of trade in Ancient Rus. Merchants and craftsmen resided there and sold goods such as pottery, armor, glass and copperware, icons, and clothing; as well as food, wax, and salt. Most large cities were adjoined by a posad, frequently situated below the main citadel and by a river. Posads were sometimes fortified with earthen walls.

As posads developed, they became like villages. Membership in the community became hereditary, and posad residents were expected to pay taxes and perform other duties to the state. Leaving the posad required the permission of an elected official. Until the 18th century, the posad had its own elected assembly, the "posadskiy skhod," though the wealthiest members of the posad tended to dominate the governance of the community in "a tight self-perpetuating oligarchy."

A number of posads evolved into towns. Those by a kremlin often gave rise to local toponyms, such as Nagorny Posad (Uphill Settlement), and Kazanski Posad for the historical center of Kazan. Those by a monastery often gave rise to cities named after the monastery, e.g., Sergiev Posad is named after the nearby Troitse-Sergiyeva Lavra.

== See also ==
- Posad people
- Lischke (settlement)
- Shtetl
