= Principality of Ryazan =

Russian principality (1129–1521)

Grand Principality of Ryazan
- 1129–1521
- Princely insignia (tamga) of the Grand Principality of Ryazan. From a coin of Prince of Ryazan Fyodor Olgovich (1402–1417)

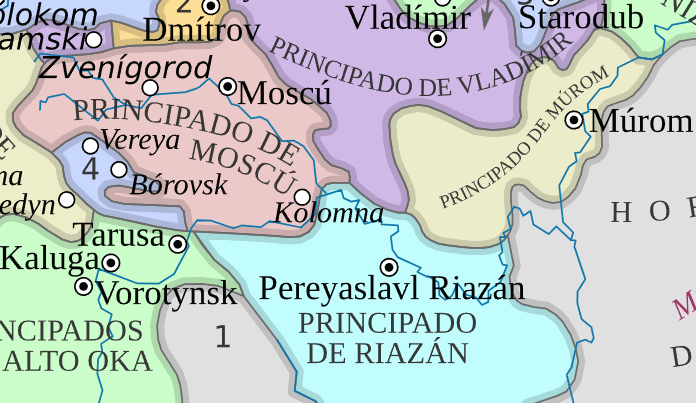
- Principality of Ryazan c. 1350
- Status: Principality
- Capital: Ryazan
- Common languages: Russian
- Religion: Russian Orthodoxy
- Government: Monarchy
- Legislature: Veche
- History
  - Established: 1129
  - Incorporation into Muscovy: 1521
Preceded by	Succeeded by
Kievan Rus'	Grand Principality of Moscow

The Principality of Ryazan, later known as the Grand Principality of Ryazan, was a Russian principality from 1129 to 1521. Its capital was the city of Ryazan, now known as Old Ryazan, which was destroyed in 1237 during the Mongol invasions. The capital was moved to Pereyaslavl-Ryazansky, later renamed Ryazan.

Initially a part of the Principality of Murom, it fully split off from the Principality of Chernigov by 1129 as Murom-Ryazan. Murom was taken by Moscow in 1392, while Ryazan later became dependent on Moscow and was formally taken over by Vasili in 1521, and incorporated into the centralized Russian state. It maintained its formal independence longer than any other Russian principality.

== History ==
=== Early history ===
Initially a part of the Principality of Chernigov, Murom-Ryazan became a separate principality under the reign of Yaroslav Sviatoslavich after he was ousted from Chernigov by Vsevolod Olgovich, which remained in possession of his descendants after he died in 1129.

The political centre of the principality was later moved to Ryazan. By the end of the 12th century, the principality waged wars with the neighbouring Grand Duchy of Vladimir. In the course of that stand-off, the city of Ryazan was burned twice in a span of twenty years from 1186 to 1208. In 1217, there was a culmination point in the history of Ryazan when during the civil war inside the Duchy six leaders of the state were killed by Gleb Vladimirovich who later defected to the Cumans. Around that time the duchy came under significant influence of Vladimir-Suzdal which was a factor in the fight of Ryazan to resume its sovereignty. In 1217, Gleb Vladimirovich with the support of Cumans tried to take Ryazan back out of the influence of the neighboring northern principality of Vladimir, but he was defeated by another Ryazan prince Ingvar Igorevich who in turn became a sole ruler of the state.

In December 1237, the duchy became the first of all other former states of Kievan Rus' to suffer from the Mongol invasion. The duchy was completely overrun, with almost the whole princely family killed, the capital destroyed and later moved to the present-day location of Ryazan, located 40 miles north from the original site of the capital today known as Ryazan Staraya (Old Ryazan). In 1238, some of the armed forces of Ryazan withdrew to unite with the Vladimir-Suzdal army and meet with the forces of Batu Khan near Kolomna.

=== Golden Horde period ===
In 1301 Prince Daniel of Moscow took Ryazan due to the boyars' betrayal and imprisoned Prince Konstantin Romanovich. In 1305 Daniel's son Prince Yury of Moscow ordered his death. The two next successors of Konstantin were killed by the Golden Horde. In 1371, the Muscovites defeated prince Oleg II Ivanovich of Ryazan in the Battle of Skornishchevo. He was exiled for six months before returning to his throne. In 1380, Oleg II did not take part in the Battle of Kulikovo, although he was an ally of Mamai.

During almost all its history, the Ryazan Principality conflicted with its provincial Pronsk Principality until Ryazan completely annexed Pronsk in 1483 during the regency of Anna of Ryazan.

=== Annexation ===
In 1520, Grand Prince Vasili III of Russia captured and imprisoned in Moscow the last Grand Prince of Ryazan Ivan V because of his relations with the Crimean Khan Mehmed I Giray. In 1521, Prince Ivan Ivanovich fled into the Grand Duchy of Lithuania. After that, in 1521, the Ryazan Principality was merged with Muscovy.

== List of princes ==
=== In Murom ===
- 1127–1129 Yaroslav I of Murom and Ryazan *^{exiled from Chernigov}

=== In Ryazan ===
- 1129–1143 Sviatoslav of Ryazan *^{his son}
- 1143–1145 Rostislav of Ryazan *^{lost Ryazan to Suzdal, but reclaimed it using Cumans}
- 1145–1178 Gleb I of Ryazan ^{*plundered Vladimir and Moscow, but died in captivity in Vladimir}
- 1180–1207 Roman I of Ryazan ^{*ruled as vassal of Vsevolod the Big Nest, Grand Prince of Vladimir, but died in his dungeon}
- 1208–1208 Yaroslav II of Ryazan^{*son of Vsevolod the Big Nest}
- 1208–1212 governors from Vladimir
- 1212–1217 Roman II of Ryazan ^{*nephew of Roman I, held captive in Vladimir, but released as their vasal}
- 1217–1218 Gleb II of Ryazan ^{*nephew of Roman I, betrayed his uncle for Vladimir and executed Roman II and 6 of his relatives using Kumans}
- 1218–1235 Ingvar I of Ryazan ^{*brother of Roman II, defeated and exiled Gleb II}
- 1235–1237 Yuri of Ryazan ^{*his brother, killed by Mongols, city destroyed}

=== In Pereslavl-Ryazansky ===
- 1237–1252 Ingvar II of Pereslavl-Ryazansky ^{*son of Ingvar I, his existence is disputed}
- 1252–1258 Oleg the Red *^{his brother, captured by Mongols in Battle of Kolomna, but ruled as their vassal and died as a monk}
- 1258–1270 Roman III Olgovich of Ryazan, the Saint ^{*his son, ruled as Mongol vassal but executed for his faith}
- 1270–1294 Fyodor I of Ryazan ^{*his son, resisted Tatar raids in 1278 and 1288}
- 1294–1299 Yaroslav III of Ryazan *^{his son}
- 1299–1301 Konstantin of Ryazan *^{his brother, executed in Moscow}
- 1301–1308 Vasily I of Ryazan *^{his son, executed in Golden Horde}
- 1308–1327 Ivan I of Ryazan *^{son of Yaroslav III, executed in Golden Horde}
- 1327–1342 Ivan II Korotopol *^{his son, died in exile}
- 1342–1344 Yaroslav IV of Ryazan *^{his cousin, usurped the throne with Tatar help}
- 1344–1350 Vasily II of Ryazan *^{his cousin}
- 1350–1402 Oleg II of Ryazan *^{son of Ivan II, in 1380 fought at the Battle of Kulikovo on Tatar side, but secretly sent most of his army to help Moscow}
- 1402–1427 Fyodor II of Ryazan *^{his son, married to daughter of Dmitry Donskoy and made alliance with Moscow}
- 1427–1456 Ivan III of Ryazan *^{his son, renounced his allegiance to Golden Horde}
- 1456–1483 Vasily III of Ryazan *^{his son, raised in the Moscow court, married to the sister of Ivan III of Russia, an ally of Moscow}
- 1483–1500 Ivan IV of Ryazan *^{swore allegiance to Ivan III of Russia}
- 1500–1521 Ivan V of Ryazan *^{the last Grand Prince, d.1534 in Lithuania}

== See also ==
- Ryazan Oblast
- Bibliography of Russian history
