= Oleg II of Ryazan =

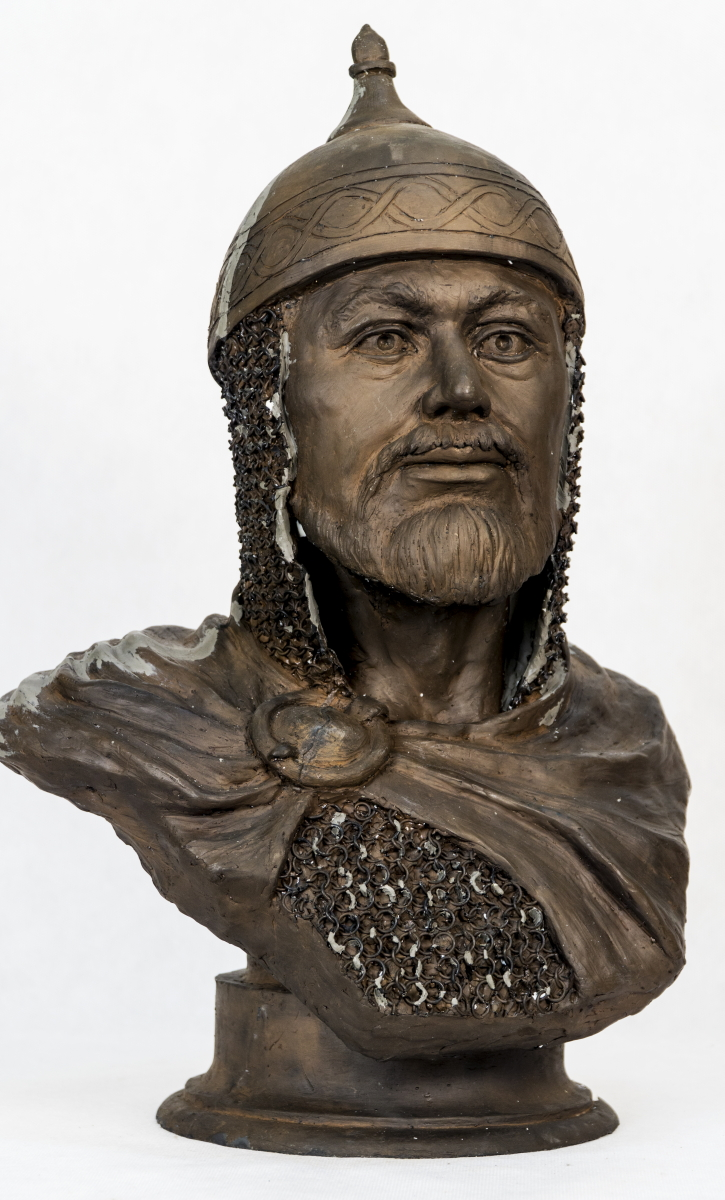
- Памятник князю Олегу на Соборной площади в Рязани
- Died: 1402
- Spouse(s): Yefrosinya / Yevpraksiya
- Issue Anastasia of Ryazan, Agrippina of Ryazan,
- Father: Ivan Aleksandrovich

Oleg II Ivanovich (died 1402) was Prince of Ryazan and Grand Prince of Ryazan from 1350 to 1402.

He is best known for his rivalry with Prince Dmitry of Moscow and his mysterious role in Battle of Kulikovo. Oleg was nominally an ally of Golden Horde, but he did not participate in the battle, and several of his boyars fought and died on the Russian side. In 2023 he was included as a saint in the Council of Ryazan Saints.

He married Euphrosyne and had two sons and four daughters including Agrippina, Alyona, Fyodor, Rodoslav, and Anastasia. His daughter Alyona married Yury of Smolensk.

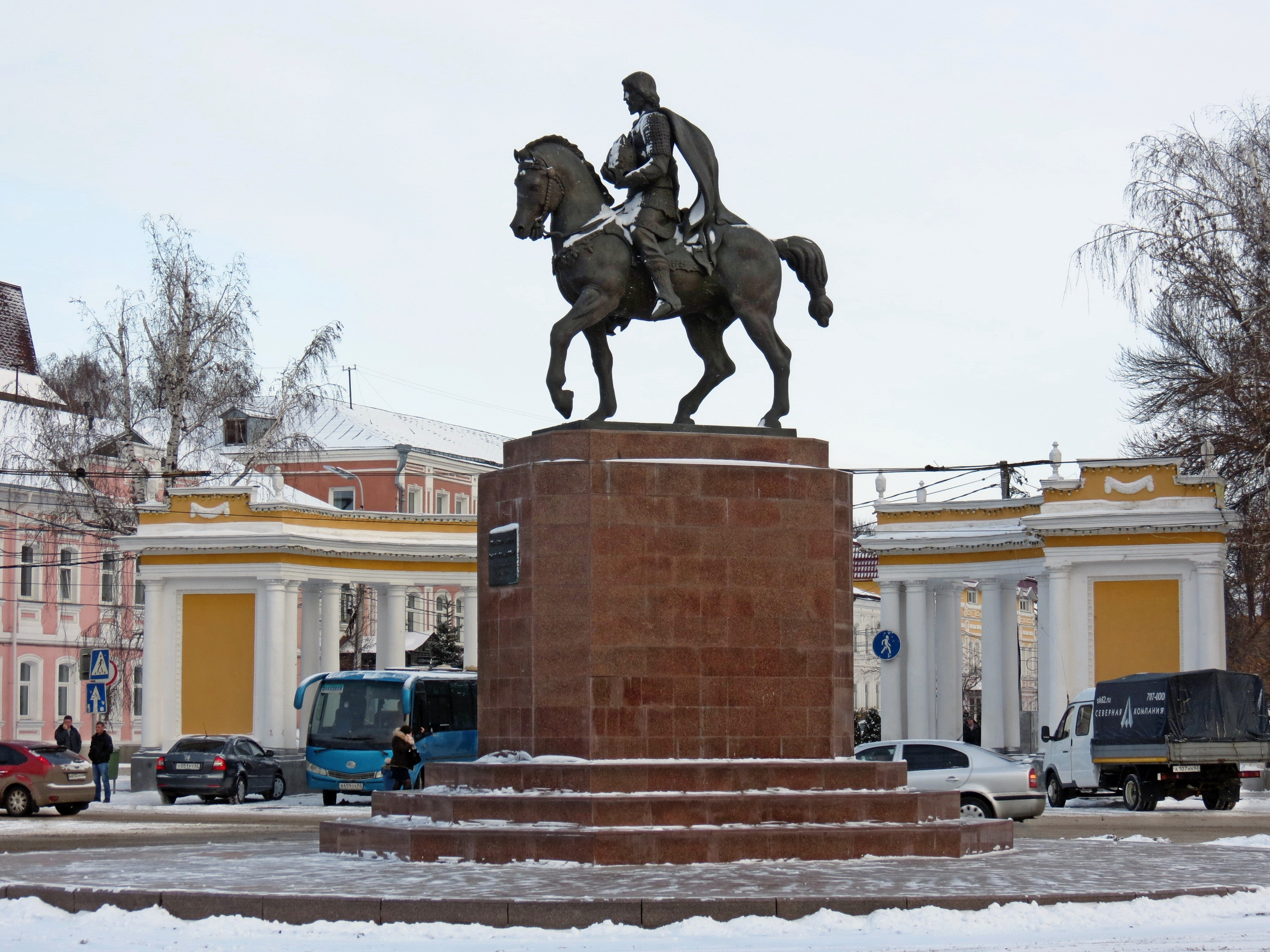
Monument to Oleg II in Ryazan

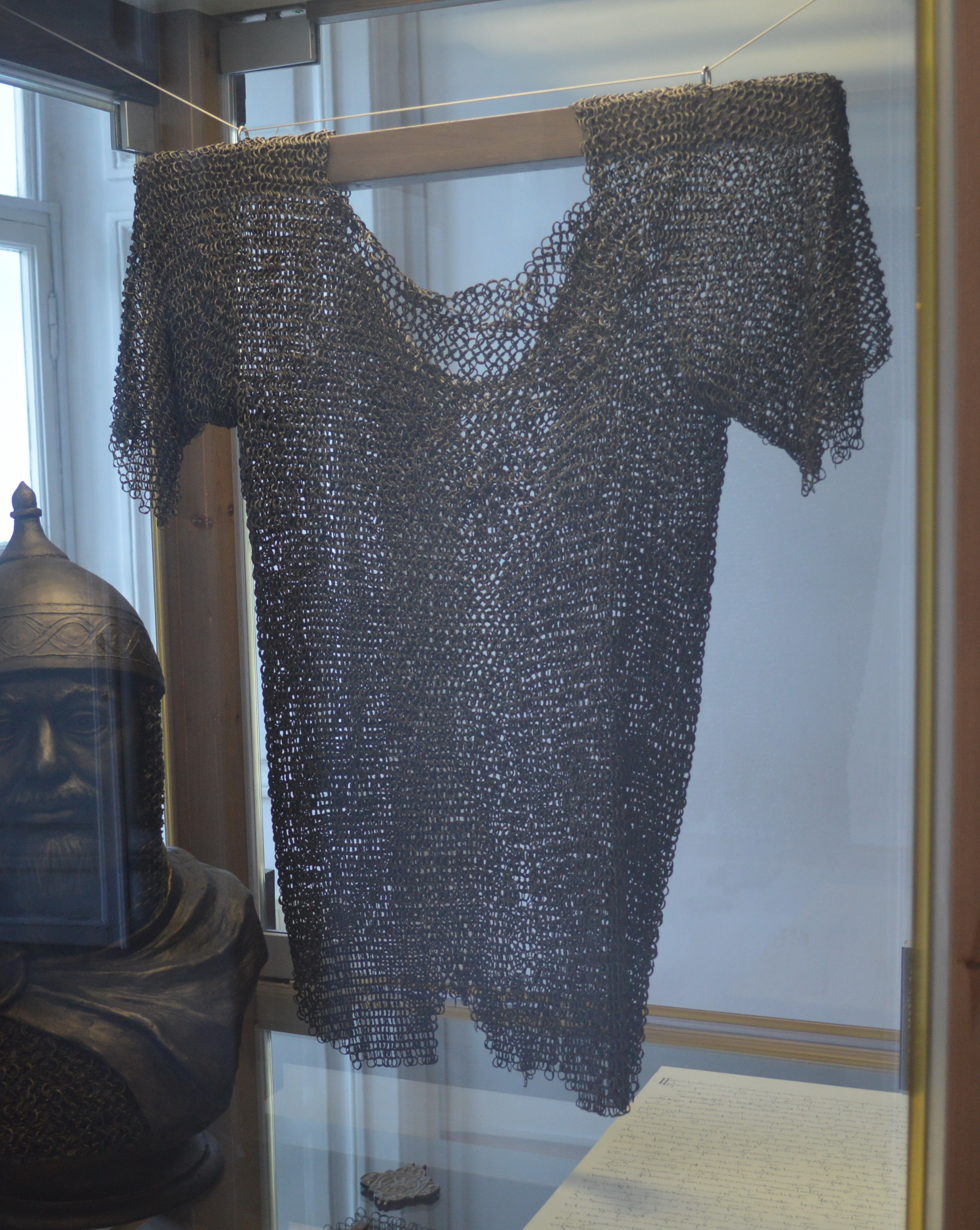
Chain mail of Oleg II
