= List of revolutions and rebellions =

The storming of the Bastille, 14 July 1789, during the French Revolution.

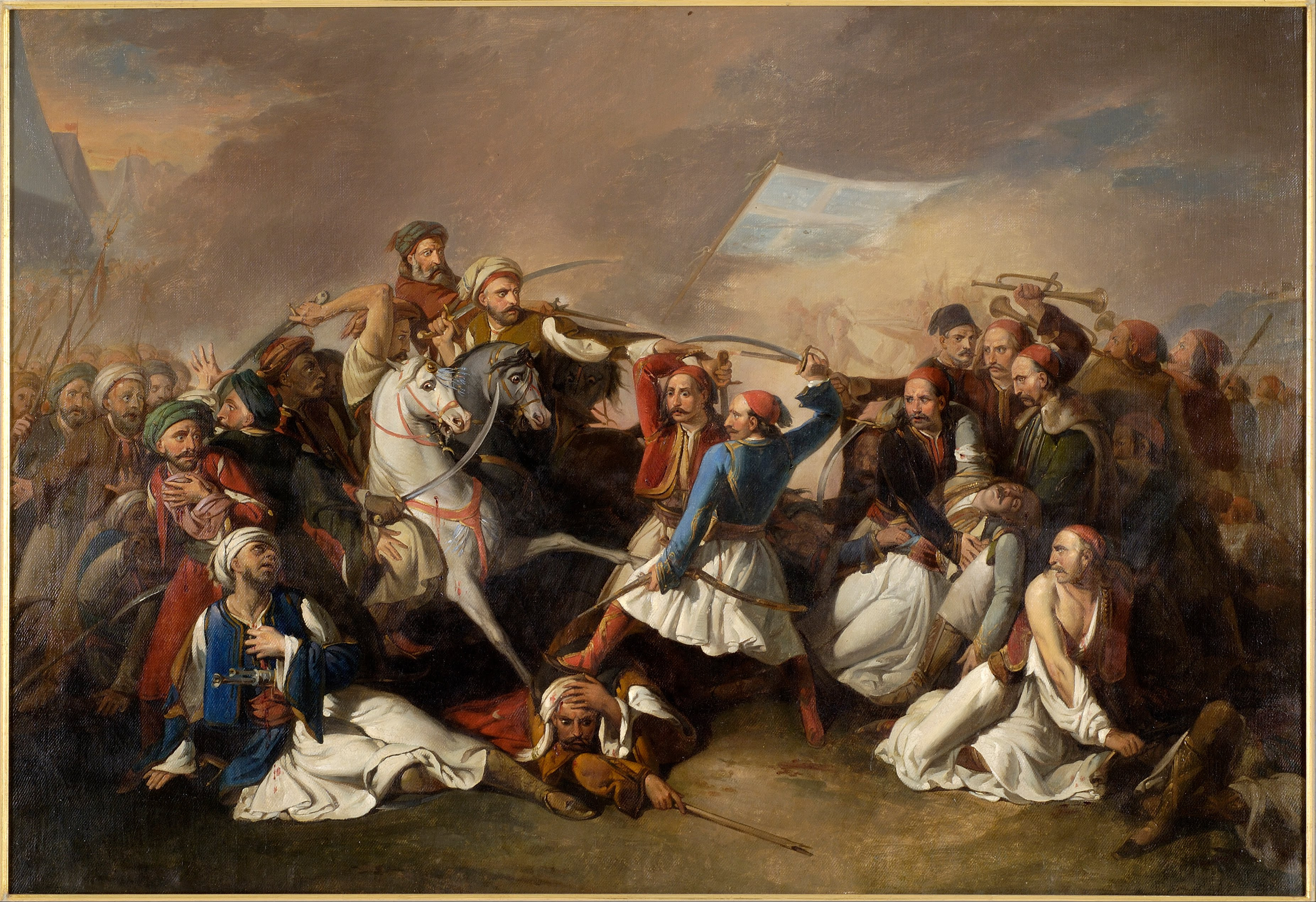
Greek War of Independence, (1821–1829), rebellion of Greeks within the Ottoman Empire, a struggle which resulted in the establishment of an independent Greece.

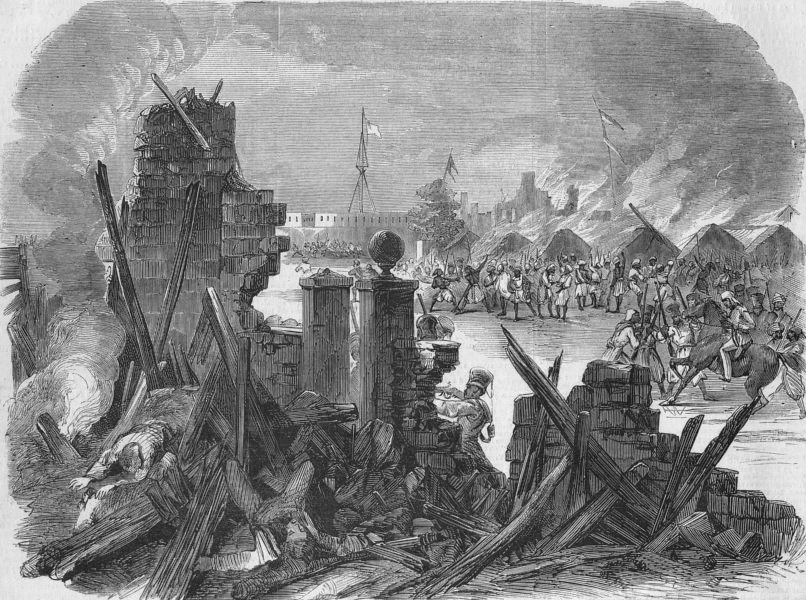
The Sepoy revolt at Meerut in 1857, part of the First War of Indian Independence against the British Empire.

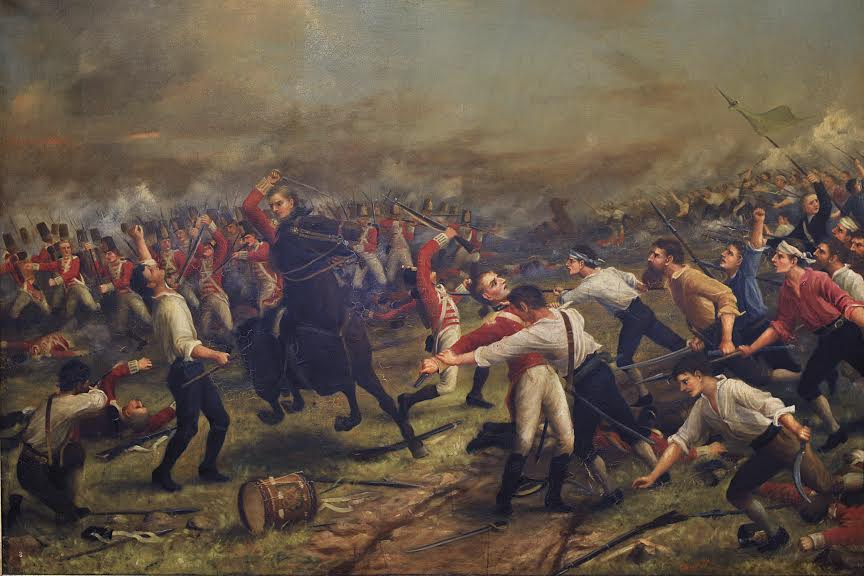
Irish rebellion of 1798, uprising against British rule in Ireland.

This is a list of revolutions, rebellions, insurrections, and uprisings.

== BC ==
Revolutionary/rebel victory
Revolutionary/rebel defeat
Another result (e.g. a treaty or peace without a clear result, status quo ante bellum, result unknown or indecisive)
Ongoing conflict

Date	Revolution/Rebellion	Location	Revolutionaries/Rebels	Result	Image	Ref
c. 2730 BCE	Set rebellion	Egypt	Priests of Horus	Egypt divides into Upper Egypt and Lower Egypt		
c. 2690 BC	Nubian revolt	Egypt	Nubians	Pharaoh Khasekhemwy quashed the rebellion, reuniting Upper Egypt and Lower Egypt		
c. 2380 BC	Sumerian revolt	Lagash, Sumer	Sumerians	The popular revolt deposed King Lugalanda and put the reformer Urukagina on the throne.		
1046 BC	Battle of Muye	China	Zhou	End of the Shang dynasty; beginning of the Zhou dynasty		
1042–1039 BC	Rebellion of the Three Guards	China	Three Guards, separatists and Shang loyalists	Decisive Zhou loyalist victory, Fengjian system established, Resistance of Shang loyalists is broken.		
842 BC	Compatriots Rebellion	China	Peasants and soldiers	King Li of Zhou was exiled and China was ruled by the Gonghe Regency until Li's death.		
626–620 BC	Revolt of Babylon	Neo-Assyrian Empire	Babylonians, led by Nabopolassar	The Babylonians overthrew Assyrian rule, establishing the Neo-Babylonian Empire, which ruled over the Near East for about a century.		
570 BC	Amasis revolt	Egypt	Egyptian soldiers	Pharaoh Apries was overthrown and exiled, giving Amasis II the opportunity to seize the throne. Apries later attempted to retake Egypt, with Babylonian support, but was defeated and killed.		
552–550 BC	Persian Revolt	Persis, Media	Persians, led by Cyrus the Great	Median rule overthrown, Persis and Media become part of the new Achaemenid Empire		
522 BC	Anti-Achaemeneid Rebellions	Achaemenid Empire	Assyrians, Babylonians, Egyptians, Elamites, Medians and Parthians	Darius the Great quashes all the rebellions within the space of a year.		
510–509 BC	Roman Revolution	Rome	Republicans	The Roman monarchy was overthrown and in its place the Roman Republic was established.		
508–507 BC	Athenian Revolution	Athens	Democrats	The Tyrant Hippias was deposed and the subsequent aristocratic oligarchy overthrown, establishing Democracy in Athens.		
499–493 BC	Ionian Revolt	Ionia, Achaemenid Empire	Greeks	The Achaemenid Empire asserts its rule over the city states of Ionia.		
494 BC	First secessio plebis	Roman Republic	Plebeians	Patricians freed some of the plebs from their debts and conceded some of their power by creating the office of the Tribune of the Plebs.		
484 BC	Bel-shimanni's rebellion	Babylon, Achaemenid Empire	Babylonians	Rebellion quickly defeated by Xerxes I.		
482–481 BC	Shamash-eriba's rebellion	Babylon, Achaemenid Empire	Babylonians	Rebellion eventually defeated by Xerxes I, Babylon's fortifications were destroyed and its temples were ransacked.		
464 BC	Third Messenian War	Sparta	Messenian Helots	Slave revolt put down by Archidamus II, who called Sparta to arms in the wake of an earthquake.		
460–454 BC	Inaros' revolt	Egypt, Achaemenid Empire	Inaros II and his Athenian allies	Defeated by the Persian army led by Megabyzus and Artabazus, after a two-year siege. Inaros was captured and carried away to Susa where he was crucified.		
449 BC	Second Secessio plebis	Roman Republic	Plebeians	The Senate forced the resignation of the Decemviri and restored both the office of Tribune of the Plebs and the right of appeal, which were suspended during the rule of the Decemvir.		
445 BC	Third Secessio plebis	Roman Republic	Plebeians	Intermarriage between Patricians and Plebeians was legalized and the position of Consular Tribune (a Tribune of the Plebs elected with the powers of a consul) was created.		
351 BC	Phoenician revolt of 351	Phoenicia	Tennes of Sidon, followed by rulers of Anatolia and Cyprus	Destruction of Sidon, execution of Tennes, and invasion of Egypt.		
342 BC	Fourth Secessio plebis	Roman Republic	Plebeians			
287 BC	Fifth Secessio plebis	Roman Republic	Plebeians	The Lex Hortensia was implemented, establishing that the laws decided by the Plebeian Council were made binding on all Roman citizens, including patricians. This law finally eliminated the political disparity between the two classes, bringing the Conflict of Orders to an end after about two hundred years of struggle.		
241 BC	Revolt of the Falisci	Roman Republic	Falisci	The Falisci were defeated and subjugated to Roman dominance, the town of Falerii was destroyed.		
209 BC	Dazexiang uprising	China	Villagers led by Chen Sheng and Wu Guang	The uprising was put down by Qin forces, Chen and Wu were assassinated by their own men.		
206 BC	Liu Bang's Insurrection	China	Han forces	The Qin dynasty is overthrown in a popular revolt and after a period of contention, Liu Bang is crowned Emperor of the Han dynasty.		
206–186 BC	Great Theban Revolt	Egypt, Ptolemaic Kingdom	Egyptians, led by Hugronaphor and Ankhmakis	Revolt put down by the Ptolemaic Kingdom, cementing Greek rule over Egypt.		
181–179 BC	First Celtiberian War	Hispania, Roman Republic	Celtiberians	Revolt eventually subdued by the Romans.		
167–160 BC	Maccabean Revolt	Judea, Coele-Syria, Seleucid Empire	Maccabees, led by Judas Maccabeus	Sovereignty of Judea is secured, eventually the independent Hasmonean dynasty is established.		
154 BC	Rebellion of the Seven States	China	Principalities led by Liu Pi	Rebellion crushed after 3 months, further centralization of imperial power.		
154–151 BC	Second Celtiberian War	Hispania, Roman Republic	Celtiberians	Rome increased its influence in Celtiberia		
143–133 BC	Numantine War	Hispania, Roman Republic	Celtiberians	Expansion of the Roman territory through Celtiberia.		
155–139 BC	Lusitanian War	Lusitania, Roman Republic	Lusitanians, led by Viriatus.	Pacification of Lusitania		
135–132 BC	First Servile War	Sicily, Roman Republic	Sicilian slaves, led by Eunus	After some minor battles won by the slaves, a larger Roman army arrived in Sicily and defeated the rebels.		
125 BC	Fregellae's revolt	Fregellae, Roman Republic	Fregellaeans	Fregellae was captured and destroyed by Lucius Opimius		
104–100 BC	Second Servile War	Sicily, Roman Republic	Sicilian slaves, led by Salvius Tryphon	The revolt was quelled, and 1,000 slaves who surrendered were sent to fight against beasts in the arena back at Rome for the amusement of the populace. To spite the Romans, they refused to fight and killed each other quietly with their swords, until the last flung himself on his own blade.		
91–88 BC	Social War	Italy, Roman Republic	Italic peoples	Eventually resulted in a Roman victory. However, Rome granted Roman citizenship to all of its Italian allies, to avoid another costly war.		
88 BC	Sulla's first march on Rome	Italy, Roman Republic	Populares	The Optimates were victorious and Sulla briefly took power in Rome.		
82–81 BC	Sulla's civil war	Italy, Roman Republic	Populares	The Optimates were once again victorious and Sulla established himself as Dictator of Rome.		
80–71 BC	Sertorian War	Hispania, Roman Republic	Populares	The war ended after the Populares leader Quintus Sertorius was assassinated by Marcus Perperna Vento, who was then promptly defeated by Pompey.		
77 BC	Lepidus' rebellion	Italy, Roman Republic	Populares	Lepidus was defeated in battle and died from illness, other Populares fled to Spain to fight in the Sertorian War.		
73–71 BC	Third Servile War	Italy, Roman Republic	Gladiators, led by Spartacus	The armies of Spartacus were defeated by the legions of Marcus Licinius Crassus.		
65 BC	First Catilinarian conspiracy	Rome, Roman Republic	Catiline	Lucius Aurelius Cotta and Lucius Manlius Torquatus remain in power as consuls.		
62 BC	Second Catilinarian conspiracy	Rome, Roman Republic	Catiline	The plot was exposed, forcing Catiline to flee from Rome. Marcus Tullius Cicero and Gaius Antonius Hybrida remain in power as consuls.		
52–51 BC	Gallic Wars	Gaul	Gauls, led by Vercingetorix	The Gallic revolt was crushed by Julius Caesar		
49–45 BC	Great Roman Civil War	Roman Republic	Populares, led by Julius Caesar	Caesar defeated the Optimates, assumed control of the Roman Republic and became Dictator in perpetuity.		
38 BC	Aquitanian revolt	Gallia Narbonensis, Roman Republic	Marcus Vipsanius Agrippa	Revolt suppressed by Marcus Vipsanius Agrippa.		
29 BC	Theban revolt	Thebes, Egypt, Roman Republic	Egyptians	Revolt suppressed by Cornelius Gallus		

== 1–999 AD ==
Date	Revolution/Rebellion	Location	Revolutionaries/Rebels	Result	Image	Ref
3–6	Gaetulian War	Mauretania, Roman Empire	Gaetuli	Revolt suppressed by Cossus Cornelius Lentulus		
6	Judas Uprising	Judea, Roman Empire	Zealots led by Judas of Galilee	Riots against the Roman census erupt throughout the country, but others are convinced by the High Priest of Israel to obey the census.		
6–9	Bellum Batonianum	Illyricum, Roman Empire	Illyrian tribes	Revolt eventually suppressed by the Romans.		
9–16	Germanic revolt	Germania	Alliance of Germanic tribes, led by Arminius	The Roman legions led by Publius Quinctilius Varus were defeated in the Battle of the Teutoburg Forest, temporarily halting further Roman occupation and colonization.		
14	Mutiny of the legions	Germania and Illyricum, Roman Empire	Roman legions	Revolt suppressed by Germanicus and Drusus Julius Caesar respectively		
15–24	Tacfarinas' revolt'	Mauretania, Roman Empire	Musulamii	Revolt suppressed by Publius Cornelius Dolabella		
17–23	First Red Eyebrow Rebellion	China	Red Eyebrow and Lulin rebels	Xin dynasty overthrown and the Gengshi Emperor is instated on the throne.		
24–27	Second Red Eyebrow Rebellion	China	Red Eyebrow rebels	Revolt suppressed by Liu Xiu's forces and the Eastern Han dynasty is established.		
21	Gaulish debtors' revolt	Gaul, Roman Empire	Treveri and Aedui	The Treveri revolt was put down by Julius Indus and the Aedui revolt was put down by Gaius Silius.		
26	Thracian revolt	Odrysian kingdom	Thracians	Revolt suppressed by Gaius Poppaeus Sabinus.		
28	Revolt of the Frisii	Frisia	Frisii	The Roman Empire is driven out of Frisia.		
36	Revolt of the Cietae	Cappadocia, Roman Empire	Cietae	Rebellion put down by Archelaus of Cilicia.		
40–43	Trung sisters' rebellion	Lĩnh Nam	Vietnamese led by the Trung Sisters	After brief end to the First Chinese domination of Vietnam, the Han dynasty reconquers the country and begins the Second Chinese domination of Vietnam.		
40–44	Mauretanian revolt	Mauretania, Roman Empire	Mauri led by Aedemon and Sabalus	Revolt suppressed by Gaius Suetonius Paulinus and Gnaeus Hosidius Geta, Mauretania is annexed directly into the empire and split into the Roman provinces of Mauretania Tingitana and Mauretania Caesariensis.		
42	Camillus' revolt	Dalmatia, Roman Empire	Roman legions led by Lucius Arruntius Camillus Scribonianus	Rebellion quickly collapses, Camillus flees to Vis where he takes his own life.		
46–48	Jacob and Simon uprising	Galilee, Judea, Roman Empire	Zealots	Revolt suppressed, Jacob and Simon executed by Tiberius Julius Alexander.		
60–61	Boudican revolt	Norfolk, Britain, Roman Empire	Celtic Britons led by Boudica	Revolt crushed by Gaius Suetonius Paulinus.		
66–73	First Jewish–Roman War	Judea	Jewish people	Revolt crushed by the Roman Empire, Jerusalem and the Second Temple are destroyed in the process.		
68	Vindex's Revolt	Gallia Lugdunensis, Roman Empire	Gaius Julius Vindex	Vindex was defeated in battle by Lucius Verginius Rufus and committed suicide.		
69	Colchis uprising	Colchis, Roman Empire	Anicetus	Uprising put down by Roman forces.		
69–70	Revolt of the Batavi	Batavia	Batavi	Revolt crushed by Quintus Petillius Cerialis and the Batavi again submitted to Roman rule, Batavia is incorporated into the Roman province of Germania Inferior.		
89	Revolt of Saturninus	Germania Superior, Roman Empire	Lucius Antonius Saturninus	Revolt swiftly crushed by the Roman legions.		
115–117	Kitos War	Eastern Mediterranean, Roman Empire	Zealots	Revolt crushed by the Roman legions and its leaders executed.		
117	Mauretanian revolt	Mauretania, Roman Empire	Mauri	Revolt suppressed by Marcius Turbo		
132–135	Bar Kokhba revolt	Judea, Roman Empire	Jewish people led by Simon bar Kokhba	All-out defeat of the Jewish rebels, followed by wide-scale persecution and genocide of Jewish people and the suppression of Jewish religious and political autonomy.		
172	Bucolic war	Egypt, Roman Empire	Egyptians led by Isidorus	Revolt suppressed by Avidius Cassius		
184–205	Yellow Turban Rebellion	China	Yellow Turban Army led by Zhang Jue	The uprising eventually collapsed and was fully suppressed by various warlords of the Eastern Han dynasty. However, the large devolution of power to regional warlords led to the collapse of the Han dynasty not long after.		
185–205	Heishan secession	Taihang Mountain, China	Heishan bandits	The autonomous confederacy eventually surrendered to the warlord Cao Cao.		
185	Roman mutiny	Britain, Roman Empire	Roman legions	Mutiny suppressed by Pertinax.		
218	Battle of Antioch	Antioch, Syria, Roman Empire	Elagabalus	Elagabalus overthrows Macrinus and is installed as Roman Emperor.		
225–248	Lady Triệu's uprising	Vietnam	Vietnamese led by Lady Triệu	After several months of warfare Lady Triệu was defeated and committed suicide. The Second Chinese domination of Vietnam continues.		
227–228	Xincheng Rebellion	Cao Wei, China	Meng Da	The revolt was suppressed by Sima Yi, Meng Da was captured and executed.		
251	Wang Ling's Rebellion	Shouchon, Cao Wei, China	Wang Ling	Wang Ling surrendered to the Wei forces and later committed suicide.		
255	Guanqiu Jian and Wen Qin's Rebellion	Shouchon, Cao Wei, China	Guanqiu Jian and Wen Qin	Cao Wei is victorious, Guanqiu Jian is slain, Wen Qin and his family fled to Eastern Wu.		
257–258	Zhuge Dan's Rebellion	Shouchon, Cao Wei, China	Zhuge Dan	Cao Wei is victorious and the Sima clan cements control over the Wei government until its eventual demise.		
284–286	Gallic peasants' rebellion	Gaul, Roman Empire	Bagaudae	Rebellion crushed by Caesar Maximian, though the Bagaudae movement would persist until the Fall of the Western Roman Empire.		
286–296	Carausian Revolt	Britain and northern Gaul, Roman Empire	Carausius and Allectus	Revolt suppressed, Britain and Gaul retaken.		
291–306	War of the Eight Princes	China	Princes of the Sima clan	Sima Yue wins the war and gains influence over the Jin emperor, but Jin authority in northern China severely weakened.		
304–316	Uprising of the Five Barbarians	North and Southwest China	Five Barbarians (Han-Zhao and Cheng-Han)	Han-Zhao victory in northern China; Cheng-Han victory in southwestern China; Fall of the Western Jin dynasty in northern China; Formation of the Eastern Jin dynasty in southern China.		
293	Revolt of the Thebaid	Thebaid, Roman Empire	Busiris and Qift	Revolt suppressed by Galerius.		
351–352	Jewish revolt against Constantius Gallus	Syria Palaestina, Roman Empire	Jewish people	The Romans crush the revolt and destroy several Jewish cities.		
398	Gildonic War	Africa, Western Roman Empire	Comes Gildo	The revolt was subdued by Flavius Stilicho.		
484	Justa uprising	Samaria, Byzantine Empire	Samaritans	Uprising suppressed by Zeno, who rebuilt the church of Saint Procopius in Neapolis and banned the Samaritans from Mount Gerizim.		
495	Samaritan unrest	Samaria, Byzantine Empire	Samaritans	Uprising suppressed by the Byzantines.		
496	Mazdak's Revolt	Sasanian Empire	Mazdakites	Mazdak successfully converted Kavadh I, before the latter was overthrown by the nobility and the former was executed.		
529–531	Ben Sabar Revolt	Samaria, Byzantine Empire	Samaritans led by Julianus ben Sabar	The forces of Justinian I quelled the revolt with the help of the Ghassanids; tens of thousands of Samaritans died or were enslaved. The Christian Byzantine Empire thereafter outlawed the Samaritan faith.		
532	Nika revolt	Constantinople, Byzantine Empire	Blue and Green demes	Revolt suppressed, its participants killed and Justinian I's rule over the Byzantine empire is strengthened.		
541	Vietnamese uprising	Vạn Xuân	Vietnamese led by Lý Nam Đế	The Second Chinese domination of Vietnam is brought to an end, the country declares itself independent as the Kingdom of Vạn Xuân and crowns Lý Nam Đế as the first king of the Early Lý dynasty.		
556	Samaritan revolt	Samaria, Byzantine Empire	Samaritans and Jewish people	Amantius, the governor of the East was ordered to quell the revolt.		
572–578	Samaritan revolt	Samaria, Byzantine Empire	Samaritans and Jewish people	Revolt suppressed, the Samaritan faith was outlawed and from a population of nearly a million, the Samaritan community dwindled to near extinction.		
608–610	Heraclian revolt	Exarchate of Africa, Byzantine Empire	Heraclius the Elder	Phocas executed and Heraclius the Younger is installed as Byzantine Emperor, establishing the Heraclian dynasty.		
611–617	Anti-Sui rebellions	China	Former Sui officials and peasant rebels	The Sui dynasty is overthrown, followed by the rise of rebel leader Li Yuan, founder of the Tang dynasty.		
614–625	Jewish revolt against Heraclius	Palaestina Prima, Byzantine Empire	Jewish people	After Palestine was retaken by the Byzantines, Jewish people were massacred and expelled from the region.		
623/624/626	Samo's rebellion	Avar Khaganate	Slavs led by Samo	Avar rule overthrown, Slavic tribes in the area unify to form Samo's Empire.		
632–633	Ridda wars	Arabia, Rashidun Caliphate	Arab tribes	Rebels forced to submit to the caliphate of Abu Bakr.		
656–661	First Fitna	Rashidun Caliphate	Umayyads	Hasan ibn Ali negotiates a treaty acknowledging Mu'awiya I as caliph, establishing the Umayyad Caliphate.		
680	Battle of Karbala	Karbala, Umayyad caliphate	Husayn ibn Ali	The Umayyads won the battle, but later went on to suffer horribly.		
680–692	Second Fitna	Umayyad Caliphate	Zubayrids, Alids and Kharijites	The Umayyad Caliphate increases its own power, restructuring the army and Arabizing and Islamizing the state bureaucracy.		
696–698	Sufri revolt	Central Iraq, Umayyad Caliphate	Sufri led by Shabib ibn Yazid al-Shaybani	Defeated by the caliphate, although Sufrism continued to be practiced in Mosul.		
700–703	Ibn al-Ash'ath's rebellion	Iraq, Umayyad Caliphate	Abd al-Rahman ibn Muhammad ibn al-Ash'ath	Revolt suppressed by the caliphate, signalling the end of the power of the tribal nobility of Iraq, which henceforth came under the direct control of the Umayyad regime's staunchly loyal Syrian troops.		
720–729	Yazid's mutiny	Basra, Umayyad Caliphate	Yazid ibn al-Muhallab	Revolt suppressed by the caliphate.		
713–722	Annam uprising	Vietnam	Vietnamese led by Mai Thúc Loan	The independent kingdom was put down by a military campaign at the order of the Emperor Xuanzong of Tang, continuing the Third Chinese domination of Vietnam		
734–746	Harith's rebellion	Khurasan, Umayyad Caliphate	Al-Harith ibn Surayj	Harith is killed and the rebellion crushed, although the revolt weakened Arab power in Central Asia and facilitated the beginning of the Abbasid Revolution.		
740	Zaidi Revolt	Kufa, Umayyad Caliphate	Zayd ibn Ali	The Umayyad governor of Iraq managed to bribe the inhabitants of Kufa which allowed him to break the insurgence, killing Zayd in the process		
740–743	Berber Revolt	Maghreb, Umayyad Caliphate	Berbers led by Maysara al-Matghari	Umayyads expelled from the Maghreb and several independent Berber states are established in the area.		
744–747	Third Fitna	Umayyad Caliphate	Pro-Yaman Umayyads, Alids led by Abdallah ibn Mu'awiya, Kharijites led by Al-Dahhak ibn Qays al-Shaybani	Victory of Marwan II and the pro-Qays faction in the inter-Umayyad civil war and anti-Umayyad revolts crushed, although Umayyad authority was now permanently weakened.		
747–748	Ibadi revolt	South Arabia, Umayyad Caliphate	Ibadis	Umayyad victory in the Hijaz and the Yemen; though Ibadi autonomy is secured in Hadramawt.		
747–750	Abbasid Revolution	Umayyad Caliphate	Abbasids	Abbasid Caliphate established, bringing an end to the privileged status for Arabs and discrimination against non-Arabs.		
752–760	Mardaite revolts	Mount Lebanon and Abbasid Caliphate	Lebanese Christians and Byzantine Empire	Christian inhabitants of parts of interior and coastal Lebanon expelled and replaced with Arab tribes.		
754	Abdallah's rebellion	Syria, Abbasid Caliphate	Abdallah ibn Ali	Abdallah's army is defeated by Abu Muslim.		
755	Córdoban revolution	Almuñécar, al-Andalus, Abbasid Caliphate	Umayyads led by Abd al-Rahman I	Umayyads take control of al-Andalus, establishing the Emirate of Córdoba.		
755–763	An Lushan Rebellion	Yan, China	An Lushan	Yan defeated by the Tang imperial forces, although the Tang dynasty was weakened.		
762–763	Alid Revolt	Hejaz and Southern Iraq, Abbasid Caliphate	Alids led by Muhammad ibn Abdallah	Revolt suppressed by the caliphate, followed by a large-scaled reprisal campaign against the Alids.		
772–804	Saxon Wars	Saxony	Saxons	Saxony is annexed into the Frankish empire and the Saxons are forcibly converted from Germanic paganism to Catholicism.		
786	Alid revolt	Mecca, Hejaz, Abbasid Caliphate	Alids	Revolt crushed by the Abbasid army and members of the Alid house are executed. One of the Alids, Idris ibn Abdallah, fled the battlefield to the Maghreb, where he established the Idrisid dynasty.		
791–802	Phùng rebellion	Vietnam	Vietnamese led by Phùng Hưng	Briefly ruled the country before the Third Chinese domination of Vietnam is reestablished.		
793–796	Qays–Yaman war	Syria, Abbasid Caliphate	Qays	Revolt crushed by the Abbasids and their Yamani allies.		
794–795	Al-Walid's rebellion	Jazira, Abbasid Caliphate	Kharijites led by Al-Walid ibn Tarif al-Shaybani	Yazid ibn Mazyad al-Shaybani met the rebels in battle in late 795, at al-Haditha above Hit, and defeated al-Walid in single combat, killing him and cutting off his head. Yazid also killed a large number of the Kharijites and forced the remainder to disperse, and the revolt ended in defeat.		
811–838	Fourth Fitna	Abbasid Caliphate	Alids led by Muhammad ibn Ja'far al-Sadiq, Qays led by Nasr ibn Shabath al-Uqayli	Al-Ma'mun takes power as Caliph, al-Sadiq is forced into exile, Qays territory is lost and Nasr surrenders to the caliphate, and the Tahirids begin their reign over Khorasan		
816–837	Babak Khorramdin Revolt	Abbasid Caliphate	An uprising or revolt of Khurramites led by Babak Khorramdin against the Abbasid Caliphate in Azerbaijan.	The suppression of the uprising, Babak was captured and executed, with more than 100,000 of his followers killed.		
814	al-Ribad rebellion	Guadalquivir, Emirate of Córdoba	Clerics in al-Ribad	Rebellion crushed at Al-Hakam I		
821–823	Thomas the Slav's rebellion	Anatolia, Byzantine Empire	Thomas the Slav	Thomas is surrendered and executed by the Byzantines		
824–836	Tunisian mutiny	Tunisia, Ifriqiya, Abbasid Caliphate	Arabs	Aghlabids put down the revolt with the help of the Berbers		
822	Aristocratic rebellion	Silla	Aristocrats led by Kim Hŏn-ch'ang	The royal faction was able to regain much of the territory that Kim Hŏn-ch'ang's forces had taken. After the fall of Gongju, Kim Hŏn-ch'ang took his own life.		
841–842	Umayyad rebellion	Palestine, Abbasid Caliphate	Umayyads led by Al-Mubarqa	Al-Hidari defeated al-Mubarqa's forces in a battle near Ramlah, al-Mubarqa taken prisoner and brought to the caliphal capital, Samarra, where he was thrown into prison and never heard of again.		
841–845	Stellinga	Saxony, Carolingian Empire	Saxon freemen and freedmen	Revolt crushed by the Carolingians and their allies in the Saxon nobility.		
845–846	Chang Pogo's mutiny	Silla	Chang Pogo	Chang Pogo assassinated by an emissary from the Silla court.		
859–860	Qiu's rebellion	Zhejiang, China	Peasants led by Qiu Fu	Rebellion was suppressed by the imperial general Wang Shi.		
861–876	Saffarid revolution	Sistan, Khorasan, Abbasid Caliphate	Saffarids led by Ya'qub ibn al-Layth al-Saffar	al-Saffar overthrows Abbasid rule over Iran and establishes the Saffarid dynasty.		
864	Alid uprising	Iraq, Abbasid Caliphate	Alids led by Yahya ibn Umar	The Alids attacked Al-Musta'in's forces, but were defeated and fled, Umar was subsequently executed.		
865–866	Fifth Fitna	Iraq, Abbasid Caliphate	Al-Mu'tazz	Al-Musta'in deposed as Caliph and succeeded by Al-Mu'tazz.		
866–896	Kharijite Rebellion	Jazira, Abbasid Caliphate	Kharijites	It was finally defeated after the caliph al-Mu'tadid undertook several campaigns to restore caliphal authority in the region.		
869–883	Zanj Rebellion	Sawad, Abbasid Caliphate	Zanj	Revolt eventually suppressed by the Abbasids.		
874–884	Qi rebellion	China	Wang Xianzhi and Huang Chao	Rebellions suppressed by the Tang dynasty, which later collapsed due to the destabilization caused by the rebellion.		
880–928	Bobastro rebellion	Emirate of Córdoba	Muwallads and Mozarabs led by Umar ibn Hafsun	Ibn Hafsun died in 917, his coalition then crumbled, and while his sons tried to continue the resistance, they eventually fell to Abd-ar-Rahman III, who proclaimed the Caliphate of Córdoba.		
899–906	The Qarmatian Revolution	Eastern Arabia, Abbasid Caliphate	Qarmatians	Qarmatians successfully establish a republic in Eastern Arabia, becoming the most powerful force in the Persian Gulf. The Qarmatians were eventually reduced to a local power by the Abbasids in 976 and annihilated by the Seljuq-backed Uyunid Emirate in 1076.		
917–924	Bulgarian–Serbian war	Balkans	Serbians led by Zaharija	Serbia is annexed into the First Bulgarian Empire.		
928–932	Bithynian rebellion	Bithynia, Byzantine Empire	Basil the Copper Hand	The revolt was finally subdued by the imperial army and Basil was executed.		
943–947	Ibadi Berber revolt	Ifriqiya, Fatimid Caliphate	Ibadi Berbers led by Abu Yazid	Revolt suppressed by the Fatimids, Abu Yazid captured and killed.		
969–970	First rebellion of Bardas Phokas the Younger	Caesarea, Byzantine Empire	Phokas family	Rebellion extinguished by Bardas Skleros, Phokas was captured and exiled to Chios, where he stayed for 7 years.		
976–979	Rebellion of Bardas Skleros	Anatolia, Byzantine Empire	Bardas Skleros	Bardas Phokas the Younger recalled from exile to put down Skleros' rebellion at the Battle of Pankaleia, Skleros seeks refuge in Baghdad.		
983	Great Slav rising	Elbe, Germany, Holy Roman Empire	Polabian Slavs	Halt to Ostsiedlung.		
987–989	Second Rebellion of Bardas Phokas the Younger	Anatolia, Byzantine Empire	Bardas Phokas the Younger and Bardas Skleros	Rebel armies surrendered after the death of Phokas.		
993–995	Da Shu rebellion	Sichuan, China	Da Shu Kingdom	The Song dynasty was able to suppress the rebellion and restore their rule over the Shu region.		
996	Peasants' revolt in Normandy	Normandy	Norman peasants	Suppression of the rebellion		
996-998	Revolt of Tyre (996–998)	Tyre, Lebanon, Fatimid Caliphate	Tyrians and Byzantine Empire	Revolt suppressed and rebels killed or enslaved		

== 1000–1499 ==
Date	Revolution/Rebellion	Location	Revolutionaries/Rebels	Result	Image	Ref
1034–1038	Serb revolt against the Byzantine Empire	Duklja, Byzantine Empire	Serbs led by Vojislav of Duklja	Revolt suppressed and Vojislav imprisoned, before starting another rebellion which eventually succeeded		
1040–1041	Uprising of Peter Delyan	Balkan peninsula, Byzantine Empire	Bulgarians led by Peter Delyan	Rebellion suppressed by Emperor Michael IV		
1072	Uprising of Georgi Voyteh	Balkan peninsula, Byzantine Empire	Bulgarians led by Georgi Voyteh	Revolt suppressed by Damianos Dalassenos		
1090	Takeover of Alamut	Alamut, Seljuk Empire	Hashshashin led by Hassan-i Sabbah	Nizari Ismaili state founded, creating the Order of Assassins		
1095	Rebellion of northern nobles against William Rufus	England	Northern nobles led by Robert de Mowbray	Suppression of the rebellion		
1125	Almohads against the Almoravids	Atlas Mountains	Masmuda tribes led by Ibn Tumart	Establishment of the Almohad Caliphate		
1143-1145	Commune of Rome Uprising	Rome	Commune of Rome	Establishment of the Commune of Rome		
1156	Hōgen Rebellion	Japan	Forces loyal to retired Emperor Sutoku	Rebellion suppressed by forces loyal to Emperor Go-Shirakawa. Established the dominance of samurai clans and eventually the first samurai-led government in the history of Japan		
1185	Rebellion of Asen and Peter against Byzantine Empire	Balkan Mountains	Bulgarians and Vlachs	Creation of the Second Bulgarian Empire		
1209–1211	Quách Bốc Rebellion	Lý dynasty	Army led by General Quách Bốc	Defeat of Emperor Lý Cao Tông and further weakening of the declining Lý dynasty		
1233–1234	Stedinger revolt	Frisia	Stedingers	Revolt suppressed by a crusade called by Pope Gregory IX		
1237–1239	Babai Revolt	Sultanate of Rum	Rebels	Revolt suppressed		
1242–1249	The First Prussian Uprising	Pomerania	Teutonic Knights	Swantopolk II returned seized lands. Knights allowed safe passage in Pomerania. Treaty of Christburg (secured rights for Christians)		
1250	Bahri revolt	Egypt	Bahri Mamluks	Mamluks consolidated power and established the Bahri dynasty		
1282	Sicilian Vespers	Sicily	Sicilian rebels	Angevin regime overthrown		
1296–1328	First Scottish War of Independence	Scotland	Kingdom of Scotland	Renewed Scottish independence		
1302	Battle of the Golden Spurs	Flanders	County of Flanders	Flemish victory. French ousted		
1323–1328	Peasant revolt in Flanders	Flanders	County of Flanders	Restoration of pro-French court. Repression of rebels		
1332–1357	Second Scottish War of Independence	Scotland	Kingdom of Scotland	Treaty of Berwick. Renewed Scottish independence		
1342	Zealots of Thessalonica	Byzantine Empire	Zealots of Thessalonica	Zealots ruled Thessalonica for 8 years		
1343–1345	St. George's Night Uprising	Estonia	Local Estonians from the Bishopric of Ösel–Wiek	Uprising suppressed		
1346-1347	Rebellion of Ismail Mukh	Deccan, Delhi Sultanate	Ismail Mukh's forces	Rebellion victory, later establishment of the Bahmani Sultanate.		
1354	Revolt of Cola di Rienzi	Rome	Cola di Rienzi and loyal forces (with help from Louis I)	Successfully revolted. However, Cola eventually abdicated and left Rome		
1356–1358	Jacquerie uprising	Northern France	Peasants	Revolt successfully repressed		
1368	Red Turban Rebellions	China	Peasant Han Chinese led by Zhu Yuanzhang	Establishment of the Ming dynasty		
1378	Revolt of the Ciompi	Florence	Laborers from Florence	City government seized. Demands of the laborers initially met. Though this would prove to be temporary.		
1378–1384	Tuchin Revolt	Béziers	Locals from Béziers	Duc de Berry suppressed the revolt		
1381	Peasants' Revolt. This was a rebellion in England led by Wat Tyler and John Ball, in which peasants demanded an end to serfdom.	England	Rebels led by Wat Tyler	Wat Tyler killed, revolt suppressed		
1382	Harelle	Rouen, Paris	Guild members of Rouen	Revolt leaders killed. City rights revoked		
c. 1387	Isfahan revolt	Isfahan	Local rebels	Revolt violently repressed		
1400–1415	Welsh revolt	Wales	Rebels headed by Owain Glyndŵr	England conquered Wales		
1404/1408/1413	Uprising of Konstantin and Fruzhin	Historical region of Bulgaria	Bulgarian nobles	Failure to liberate Bulgaria		
1418–1427	Lam Sơn uprising	Northern Vietnam	Rebels led by Lê Lợi	Independence of Đại Việt		
1421–1432	Jasrat's rebellion	Delhi Sultanate	Khokhars of Sialkot led by Jasrat	Liberation of Punjab upto Ravi. Later pushed back to Chenab.		
1431–1435	First Irmandiño revolt	Galicia	Peasantry and bourgeoisie	Revolt suppressed		
1434–1436	Engelbrekt rebellion	Dalarna	Engelbrekt Engelbrektsson	Engelbrekt assassinated. Kalmar Union eroded		
1437	Transylvanian peasants revolt	Kingdom of Hungary	Transylvanian peasants and petty nobles	Patrician victory		
1444–1468	Skanderbeg's rebellion	Ottoman-ruled Albania	Skanderbeg and his forces	Skanderbeg agreed to peace and paid tribute to the Ottomans.		
1450	Jack Cade's Rebellion	Kent, England	Rebels led by Jack Cade	Royal victory		
1462–1485	Rebellion of the Remences	Principality of Catalonia	Peasants	Indecisive		
1467–1470	Second Irmandiño revolt	Galicia	Peasantry and bourgeoisie	Irmandiño movement defeated		
1497	Cornish rebellion of 1497	England	Rebels mainly from Cornwall	Royal victory		

== 1500–1699 ==
Date	Revolution/Rebellion	Location	Revolutionaries/Rebels	Result	Image	Ref
1499–1501	Rebellion of the Alpujarras	Kingdom of Granada	Muslims of Granada	Rebellion suppressed and mass forced conversions of all Muslims in Granada		
1501–1503	War of Deposition against King Hans	Kalmar Union	Swedish separatists	Separatist victory, Kalmar Union de facto dissolved		
1501–1504	Alvsson's rebellion against King Hans of Norway	Denmark and Norway	Norwegian separatists	Rebellion suppressed		
1514	Peasants' war led by György Dózsa	Kingdom of Hungary	Peasants led by György Dózsa	Rebellion suppressed and György Dózsa was executed		
1515	Slovene peasant revolt	Holy Roman Empire	Peasants	Revolt put down by Holy Roman Empire mercenaries		
1515–1523	Arumer Zwarte Hoop	Habsburg Netherlands	Frisian rebels led by Pier Gerlofs Donia and Wijerd Jelckama.	Rebellion suppressed		
1516	Trần Cảo Rebellion	Lê dynasty	Trần Cao rebels	Rebellion suppressed. Lê dynasty weakened by ensuing civil war		
1519–1523	Revolt of the Brotherhoods	Valencia	Germanies autonomist rebels	Rebel leader L'Encobert killed and strongholds of the Germanies captured		
1520–1522	Revolt of the Comuneros	Royalist Castilians	Comuneros rebels	Royalist victory		
1521–1522	Santo Domingo Revolt	Colony of Santo Domingo	Enslaved Africans	Suppression of the revolt		
1521–1523	Gustav Vasa's Rebellion	Kalmar Union	Rebels led by nobleman Gustav Vasa	Rebels successfully deposed King Christian II from the throne of Sweden		
1524–1525	German Peasants' War	Swabian League	Peasants' army	Suppression of revolt and execution of its participants		
1526	Slave revolt in San Miguel de Gualdape	San Miguel de Gualdape	Rebels	Inconclusive		
1531	The Straccioni Rebellion, uprising in Lucca	Lucca	Rebels			
1532–1547	Sebastián Lemba's rebellion	Captaincy General of Santo Domingo	Rebels led by maroon Sebastián Lemba	Suppression of the revolt		
1536	Pilgrimage of Grace	Establishment reformers	Traditionalists	Suppression of the uprisings, execution of the leading figures		
1540–1542	Mixtón War	New Spain	Caxcanes	Spaniard and indigenous allied victory		
1542	Dacke War	Sweden	Rebels	Rebellion suppressed		
1548	Revolt of the Pitauds	Kingdom of France	French peasants against the salt tax	Rebellion suppressed		
1548–1582	Bayano Wars	Colonial Panama	Enslaved Bayano rebels	Rebellion suppressed		
1549	Prayer Book Rebellion	Kingdom of England	Catholic rebels in Cornwall and Devon	Rebellion suppressed		
1549	Kett's Rebellion	Kingdom of England	East Anglian rebels	Rebellion suppressed		
1550–1590	Chichimeca War	New Spain	Chichimeca Confederation	Chichimeca military victory		
1567–1872	Philippine revolts against Spain	Spanish East Indies	Rebels			
1568–1571	Morisco rebellions in Granada	Habsburg Spain	Morisco rebels	Rebellion suppressed		
1568–1648	Eighty Years' War	Spanish Netherlands	Dutch Republic	Peace of Münster		
1569–1570	Rising of the North	Elizabeth I of England	Partisans of Mary, Queen of Scots and Northern English Catholics	Elizabethan victory		
1570–1618	Gaspar Yanga's revolt against Spanish colonial rule in Mexico	New Spain	Rebels led by Gaspar Yanga	Ended with the signing of a treaty with Spain		
1573	Croatian–Slovene peasant revolt	Croatian, Styrian and Carniolan nobility and Uskoks	Croatian and Slovene peasants	Rebellion suppressed		
1590–1610	Celali rebellions	Ottoman Empire	Celali rebels	Suppressed by Kuyucu Murad Pasha		
1591–1594	Rappenkrieg	Basel	Peasants	Negotiations led to a restriction to tax increases. Insurgents were spared punishment		
1594–1595	Croquant rebellion	Limousin	Rebels	Croquants disarmed		
1594–1603	Nine Years' War	Kingdom of England	Irish alliance	English victory		
1594	Banat Uprising	Ottoman Empire	Serb rebels	Rebellion suppressed		
1596–1597	Club War	Finland, Kingdom of Sweden	Finnish peasants	Rebellion suppressed		
1596–1597	Serb Uprising against the Ottomans	Ottoman Empire	Serb rebels	Rebellion suppressed		
1597	First Guale revolt developed in Florida against the Spanish missions and led by Juanillo	New Spain	Rebels led by Juanillo	Rebellion suppressed		
1598	First Tarnovo uprising	Ottoman Empire	Bulgarian rebels	Rebellion suppressed		
1600–1601	Thessaly rebellion	Ottoman Empire	Greek rebels	Rebellion suppressed		
1600–1607	Acaxee Rebellion	New Spain	Acaxee	Rebellion suppressed		
17th–19th c.	Circassian Revolution	Circassia	Peasants	Revolutionary victory		
1606–1607	Bolotnikov rebellion	Tsardom of Russia	Rebels led by Bolotnikov	Rebellion suppressed		
1616–1620	Tepehuán Revolt	New Spain	Tepehuánes	Rebellion suppressed		
1618–1625	Bohemian Revolt	(Holy Roman Empire) Habsburg monarchy (Spain) Spanish Empire Catholic League (Electorate of Saxony) Saxony	Crown of Bohemia Palatinate (Austria) Upper-Lower Austrian rebels Transylvania	Imperial victory		
1631–1634	Salt Tax Revolt	(Spain) Spanish Empire	Rebels in Biscay	Ringleaders arrested and executed		
1637–1638	Shimabara Rebellion	Tokugawa shogunate	Japanese Catholics	Tokugawa victory		
1639	Revolt of the va-nu-pieds	Kingdom of France	Rebels in Normandy	Rebellion suppressed		
1640–1668	Portuguese Revolt	(Spain) Spanish Empire	Kingdom of Portugal	Portuguese victory		
1640–1652	Catalan Revolt	(Spain) Spanish Empire	Principality of Catalonia Kingdom of France	Catalan defeat		
1641–1642	Irish Rebellion of 1641	Kingdom of England Kingdom of Scotland	Irish Catholic Nobility	Irish victory and the Founding of the Irish Catholic Confederation		
1641	Acclamation of Amador Bueno in the Captaincy of São Vicente, Brazil	Captaincy of São Vicente				
1642–1652	English Civil War	English and Welsh Royalists	English and Welsh Parliamentarians	Parliamentarian victory, Execution of Charles I, establishment of the Commonwealth of England		
1644	Li Zicheng's Uprising	Ming dynasty	Rebels led by Li Zicheng	Overthrow of the Ming dynasty and the establishment of the Shun dynasty		
1647	Naples Revolt	Kingdom of Naples	Neapolitan Republic	Rebellion suppressed		
1648	Khmelnytsky uprising	Poland–Lithuania	Zaporozhian Host	Emergence of Cossack Hetmanate under Russian protection		
1648	Moscow salt riot	Tsardom of Russia	Rebels	Arrest and execution of many of the leaders of the uprising		
1648–1653	Fronde	Kingdom of France	Parlements	Rebellion suppressed		
1658	Revolt of Abaza Hasan Pasha	Ottoman Empire	Rebels led by Abaza Hasan Pasha	Rebellion suppressed		
1659	Kakhetian Uprising (1659)	Safavid Persia	Kingdom of Kakheti	Strategically inconclusive		
1662–1664	Bashkir rebellion	Tsardom of Russia	Bashkir rebels	Demands of the rebels met		
1664–1670	Magnate conspiracy	(Holy Roman Empire) Habsburg monarchy	Rebels	Rebellion suppressed		
1667–1668	First Revolt of the Angelets	Vallespir	Anti-salt tax rebels	Compromise of Céret. Tax inspectors ended controls		
1668–1676	Solovetsky Monastery uprising	Tsardom of Russia	Old Believer monks	Rebellion suppressed		
1670–1674	Second Revolt of the Angelets	Conflent	Rebels against the salt tax	Rebellion suppressed		
1672	Pashtun rebellion	Mughal Empire	Pashtun rebels	Rebellion suppressed		
1672–1674	Lipka rebellion	Poland–Lithuania	Lipka Tatars Ottoman Empire	Tatars' privileges, payments and religious freedoms guaranteed		
1672–1678	Messina Revolt	(Spain) Spanish Empire	Sicilian rebels			
1674–1680	Trunajaya rebellion	Mataram Sultanate Dutch East India Company	Rebel forces	Rebellion suppressed		
1675	Revolt of the papier timbré, an anti-tax revolt in Brittany	Kingdom of France	Rebels in Brittany			
1675–1676	King Philip's War	New England Confederation	Native Americans	Confederation victory		
1676	Bacon's Rebellion	Colony of Virginia	Virginia colonists, indentured servants and slaves	Change in Virginia's Native American-Frontier policy		
1680–1692	Pueblo Revolt	(Spain) Spanish Empire	Puebloans	Pueblo victory, expulsion of Spanish settlers		
1681–1684	Bashkir rebellion	Tsardom of Russia	Bashkir rebels	Demands of the rebels met		
1682	Moscow Uprising	Tsardom of Russia	Streltsy regiments	Sophia suppressed the Streltsy and Tararui in their attempts to remove her from power		
1684	Beckman's Revolt	Maranhão e Grão-Pará	Manoel Beckman and rebels	Rebellion suppressed		
1685	Monmouth Rebellion	Kingdom of England	Monmouth rebels	Rebellion suppressed		
1685	Argyll Rebellion	Kingdom of Scotland	Covenanter rebels	Rebellion suppressed		
1686	Second Tarnovo uprising	Ottoman Empire	Bulgarian rebels	Rebellion suppressed		
1687–1689	Revolt of the Barretinas	(Spain) Spanish Empire	Catalan rebels	Rebellion suppressed		
1688	Chiprovtsi uprising	Ottoman Empire	Catholic Bulgarian rebels	Rebellion suppressed		
1688	Siamese revolution of 1688	Prasat Thong dynasty Kingdom of France	Phetracha and various Siamese lords Dutch Republic	Victory for Phetracha's forces and his Dutch allies		
1688	Glorious Revolution	Kingdom of England	Rebels	James II replaced as king by his daughter Mary II and her husband William III		
1688–1746	Jacobite risings	Kingdom of England	Jacobites	Rebellion suppressed		
1689	Karposh’s Rebellion	Ottoman Empire	Bulgarian rebels	Rebellion suppressed		
1689	Boston revolt	Dominion of New England	Boston colonists	Dissolution of the Dominion of New England; ouster of officials loyal to James II		
1693	Second Brotherhood	Valencia	Rebels	Rebellion suppressed		
1698	Streltsy uprising	Tsardom of Russia	Rebels	Rebellion suppressed		

== 1700–1799 ==
Date	Revolution/Rebellion	Location	Revolutionaries/Rebels	Result	Image	Ref
1702–1715	War of the Camisards	Kingdom of France	Camisards	Rebellion suppressed		
1703–1711	Rákóczi Uprising	Holy Roman Empire	Kuruc (Kingdom of Hungary)	Rebellion suppressed		
1707–1709	Bulavin Rebellion	Tsardom of Russia	Don Cossack rebels	Rebellion suppressed		
1707–1709	Newcomers' War	Captaincy of São Vicente, Brazil	Paulistas	Rebellion suppressed		
1709	Mirwais Hotak's rebellion against Gurgin Khan, the Persian governor of Kandahar	Safavid Persia	Rebels led by Mirwais Hotak	rebellion successful		
1709–1710	Pablo Presbere's insurrection against Spanish colonial power	(Spain) Spanish Empire	Rebels led by Pablo Presbere			
1710–1711	Peddlers' War	Pernambuco, Brazil	Rebels			
1711	Cary's Rebellion	Province of Carolina	Rebels			
1712	Tzeltal Rebellion	New Spain	indigenous rebels			
1712	New York Slave Revolt of 1712	Colony of New York	Rebel slaves	Rebellion suppressed		
1713-1714	War of the Catalans	Kingdom of Spain	Principality of Catalonia	Catalan defeat		
1715	First Jacobite rising	Kingdom of Great Britain Dutch Republic	Rebels led by James Francis Edward Stuart	Rebellion suppressed		
1720	Vila Rica Revolt	Minas Gerais, Brazil	Rebels			
1722	Afghan rebels defeated Shah Sultan Husayn and ended the Safavid dynasty.	Safavid Persia under Shah Sultan Husayn	Afghan rebels	rebellion successful		
1728–1740	First Maroon War	(Kingdom of Great Britain) British Empire	Jamaican Maroons	Maroon victory, the British government offered peace treaties		
1729	Natchez revolt	French colonists	the Natchez			
1731	Samba rebellion	French Louisiana	Rebel slaves			
1733–1734	Slave insurrection on St. John	Denmark–Norway Kingdom of France	Rebel slaves	Rebellion suppressed		
1737–39	Serb uprising	Ottoman Empire	Serb rebels	Rebellion suppressed		
1739	Stono Rebellion	Colony of South Carolina	Escaped slaves	Rebellion suppressed		
1741	New York Conspiracy of 1741	Province of New York	slaves and poor whites			
1743	Fourth Dalecarlian rebellion	Sweden	peasants'	Rebellion suppressed		
1744–1829	Dagohoy rebellion	(Spain) Spanish Empire	Boholano people	Rebellion suppressed		
1745–1746	Jacobite rising	Great Britain Dutch Republic	Jacobites	Rebellion suppressed		
1747	Orangist revolution					
1748	Uprising led by Juan Francisco de León in Panaquire, Venezuela, against monopoly interests and the dominance of the Royal Company Guipuzcoana in terms of trade cocoa		Rebels led by Juan Francisco de León			
1749	Conspiracy of the Slaves	Malta	Rebel slaves			
1751–1752	Pima Revolt					
1753	The Lunenburg Rebellion	Great Britain	immigrant rebels	Rebellion suppressed		
1755–1769	The revolution that ended Genoese rule and established a Corsican Republic	Republic of Genoa	Corsican Republic	Revolution was brought to an end by the French conquest of Corsica		
1760	Tacky's War	(Kingdom of Great Britain) Great Britain Colony of JamaicaMaroon allies	Enslaved "Coromantee" people	Rebellion suppressed		
1763	Berbice slave uprising	Society of Berbice Society of Suriname Barbados Navy Dutch Navy	Arawak and Carib allies	Rebellion suppressed		
1763–1766	Pontiac's War	(Kingdom of Great Britain) Great Britain	numerous North American Indian tribes	Military stalemate		
1765	Quito Revolt of 1765	(Spain) Viceroyalty of New Granada	Rebels			
1765	Strilekrigen	Denmark–Norway	Norwegian farmers	Rebellion suppressed		
1768	Louisiana Rebellion of 1768	New Spain	Creole and German settlers	Rebellion suppressed		
1769–1773	First Carib War	(Kingdom of Great Britain) Great Britain	Carib inhabitants of Saint Vincent			
1770	Orlov revolt	Ottoman Empire Pashalik of Scutari	Greeks Supported by: (Russian Empire) Russia	Rebellion suppressed		
1771–1785	Tây Sơn wars	Tây Sơn; Cham people Chinese Vietnamese (1771–1777); Pirates of the South China Coast	Nguyễn lord Kingdom of Cambodia; Siam; France (1778–1802, limited); Kingdom of Vientiane; Chinese Vietnamese (Hoà Nghĩa army)	Nguyễn lord victory		
1773–1775	Pugachev's Rebellion	(Russian Empire) Russia	Coalition of Cossacks, Russian Serfs, Old Believers, and non-Russian peoples	Rebellion suppressed		
1775	Rising of the Priests	(Sovereign Military Order of Malta) Order of Saint John	Rebels	Rebellion suppressed		
1775–1783	American Revolutionary War	(Kingdom of Great Britain) Great Britain; Loyalists	United States	Revolutionary victory		
1780–1783	Rebellion of Túpac Amaru II	(Spain) Spanish Empire	Aymara-Quechua rebels			
1780–1787	The Patriot Revolt	Dutch Republic	Rebels			
1781	Revolt in Bihar	British East India Company	Rebels in Bihar			
1781	Revolt of the Comuneros	(Spain) Viceroyalty of New Granada	Rebels			
1782	Sylhet uprising	British East India Company	Bengali Muslim Rebels	Rebellion suppressed		
1782	Geneva Revolution	Republic of Geneva	the third estate			
1786–1787	Shays' Rebellion	United States	Shaysites	Rebellion suppressed		
1786–1787	Lofthusreisingen	Norway	Rebels			
1787	Abaco Slave Revolt	(Kingdom of Great Britain) Great Britain	Rebels	Rebellion suppressed		
1788	Kočina Krajina Serb rebellion	Ottoman Empire	Serb rebels	Rebellion suppressed		
1789–1799	French Revolution	Kingdom of France	Revisionaries	Revolutionary victory: Abolition of the Ancien Régime and creation of constitutional monarchy; Proclamation of the French First Republic in September 1792; Reign of Terror and Execution of Louis XVI; French Revolutionary Wars; Establishment of the French Consulate in November 1799		
1789–1790	Brabant Revolution	Austrian Netherlands	Rebels	Rebellion suppressed		
1789–1791	Liège Revolution	Prince-Bishops of Liège	Republic of Liège (1789–1791) France (from 1792)	Revolutionary victory: The price-bishops of Liège were overthrown by a popular uprising		
1790	Saxon Peasants' Revolt		Rebels	Rebellion suppressed		
1790	The first slave revolt	British Virgin Islands	Rebels			
1791	Whiskey Rebellion	United States	Frontier tax protesters	Rebellion suppressed		
1791	Mina conspiracy	United States	Rebels			
1791–1804	Haitian Revolution	1791–1793: Kingdom of France (until 1792); French Republic; 1793–1798: Spain (until 1795); St. Dominican Royalists; 1798–1801: Rigaud Loyalists; 1802–1804: France	1791–1793: St. Dominican Rebels; Spain (from 1793); St. Dominican Royalists; 1793–1798: French Republic; 1798–1801: Louverture Loyalists; 1802–1804: Armée Indigène; United Kingdom	Haitian victory		
1792	War in Defence of the Constitution	Poland–Lithuania	(Russian Empire) Russia	Polish defeat		
1793	Slave rebellion produced in the Guadeloupe island following the outbreak of the French Revolution.	France	Rebels			
1793	Jumla rebellion	Kingdom of Nepal Ranajit Kunwar	Sobhan Shahi People of Jumla			
1793–1796	War in the Vendée	France	Vendeans Supported by: Great Britain	Rebellion suppressed		
1794	Kościuszko Uprising	Poland–Lithuania	(Russian Empire) Russia Kingdom of PrussiaHoly Roman Empire	Rebellion suppressed		
1794	Whiskey Rebellion	United States	Frontier tax protesters	Rebellion suppressed		
1794	Stäfner Handel uprising	Republic of Zürich	Rebels			
1795	Batavian Revolution	Orangists Supported by: Prussia; Great Britain	Patriots Supported by: France	Revolutionary victory		
1795	Curaçao Slave Revolt	Dutch Republic	Slave rebels	Rebellion suppressed		
1795–1796	1795–1796: In those years broke out several slave rebellions in the entire Caribbean, influenced by the Haitian Revolution: in Cuba, Jamaica (Second Maroon War), Dominica (Colihault Uprising), Louisiana (Pointe Coupée conspiracy), Saint Lucia (Bush War, so-called "Guerre des Bois"), Saint Vincent (Second Carib War), Grenada (Fédon's rebellion), Curaçao (led by Tula), Guyana (Demerara Rebellion) and in Coro, Venezuela (led by José Leonardo Chirino)					
1796	Conspiracy of Equals	France	Rebels	Conspiracy discovered and repressed		
1796	Boca de Nigua Revolt	Colony of Santo Domingo	Slave rebels led by Francisco Sopo			
1796–1804	White Lotus Rebellion	Qing dynasty	Rebels	Rebellion suppressed		
1797	Spithead and Nore mutinies	Great Britain	Mutineers			
1797	1797 Rugby School Rebellion	Great Britain	Mutineers			
1797	Scottish Rebellion	Great Britain	Rebels	Rebellion suppressed		
1798	Irish Rebellion of 1798	Great Britain	United Irishmen; Defenders; France	Rebellion suppressed		
1798	The Maltese Revolt in September 1798 against French administration in Malta. The French capitulated in September 1800 after they were blockaded inside the islands' harbour fortifications for two years	France	Rebels			
1798–1804	James Corcoran's Guerilla Campaign	Great Britain	United Irishmen			
1799–1800	Fries's Rebellion	United States	Rebels led by John Fries			
1799-1803	Michael Dwyers Guerilla Campaign	Great Britain	United Irishmen			

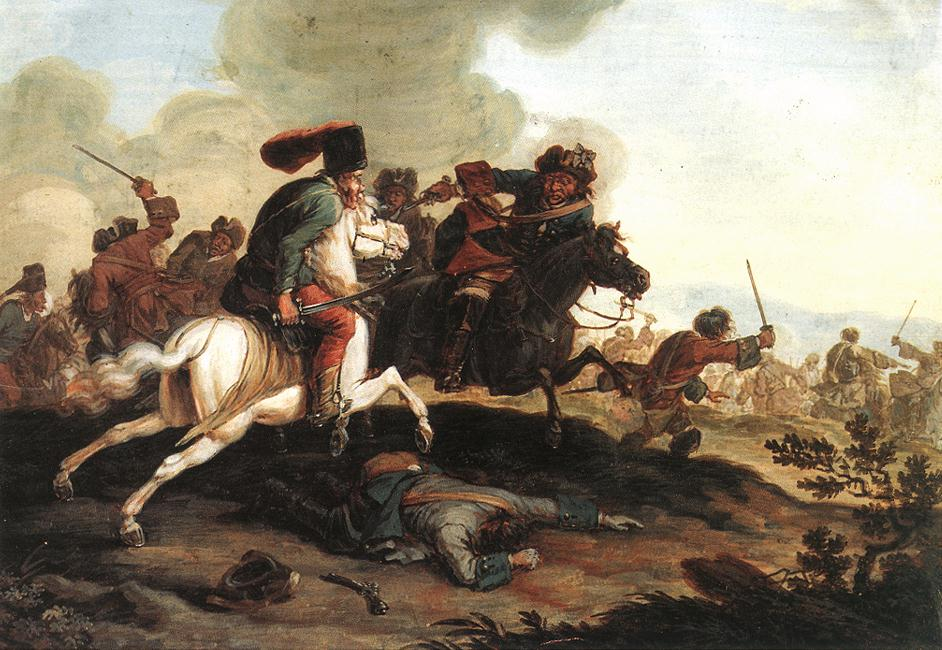
The so-called kuruc were armed anti-Habsburg rebels in Royal Hungary between 1671 and 1711.

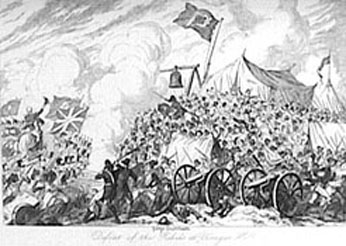
Depiction of the Battle of Vinegar Hill during the Irish Rebellion of 1798.

== 1800–1849 ==
Date	Revolution/Rebellion	Location	Revolutionaries/Rebels		Result	Image	Ref
1803	Irish rebellion of 1803	Great Britain	United Irishmen		Rebellion suppressed		
1804	Uprising against the Dahije	(Ottoman Empire) Dahije (Ottoman janissaries)	(Revolutionary Serbia) Serbian rebels		Serbian victory		
1804-13	First Serbian Uprising	Ottoman Empire	(Revolutionary Serbia) Serbian rebels		Rebellion suppressed		
1809	Tyrolean Rebellion	France; Kingdom of Bavaria; Italy; Saxony	Tyrolean civilian militia (Schützen) Supported by: Austrian Empire		French Victory		
1809–1825	Bolivian War of Independence	Royalists: Spain; Viceroyalty of Peru	Patriots: Bolivia; Republiquetas; Gran Colombia; Peru; (Argentina) United Provinces		Patriot Victory		
1809–1826	Peruvian War of Independence	Royalists: Spanish Monarchy: (Spain) Viceroyalty of Peru; (Spain) Captaincy-General of Chile	Patriots: Rebels or Juntas Peru Co-belligerents United Provinces Chile Colombia		Patriot Victory		
1810	The House Tax Hartal was an occasion of nonviolent resistance to protest a tax in parts of British India, with a particularly noteworthy example of hartal (a form of general strike) in the vicinity of Varanasi	(British Empire) British India	Demonstrators				
1810	The West Florida rebellion against Spain, eventually becomes a short-lived republic.	Spain	Rebels				
1810–1821	Mexican War of Independence	Spanish Empire: Viceroyalty of New Spain	Insurgents Army of the Three Guarantees		Insurgent victory		
1810	May Revolution	Spanish Empire: Viceroyalty of New Spain	Primera Junta		Primera Junta victory		
1810–1818	Argentine War of Independence	Royalists (Spain) Spanish Monarchy: Viceroyalty of the Río de la Plata; Viceroyalty of Peru	Patriots: United Provinces of the Río de la Plata Orientals Chile Republiquetas		Argentine victory and emancipation from Spanish colonial rule		
1810–1823	Venezuelan War of Independence	(Spanish Empire) Royalists Spain: (Spain) Supreme Junta; (Spain) Governorate of Venezuela; (Spain) Governorate of Colombia	Patriots 1810: Caracas Junta 1811–1816: Venezuela Colombia 1816–1819: Venezuela Haiti 1819–1823: Gran Colombia		Patriot victory		
1810–1826	Chilean War of Independence	Royalists: Kingdom of Spain; Viceroyalty of Peru; Captaincy General of Chile; Governorate of Chiloé; Mapuche allies of the Royalists	Patriots: Chile(Patria Vieja, until 1814); Chile(Patria Nueva, since 1817); (Argentina) United Provinces; Mapuche allies of the Patriots		Chilean victory		
1811	Paraguayan Revolt	Spain	Paraguayan Rebels		Revolt victory		
1811	German Coast uprising	United States	Enslaved Africans		Suppression of uprising		
1811	1811 Independence Movement	Spain	Salvadoran revolutionaries		Rebellion suppressed		
1812	Hong Kyŏngnae's Rebellion	Joseon dynasty	Rebels led by Hong Kyŏngnae		Rebellion suppressed		
1812	Aponte conspiracy	Spanish Empire: Captaincy General of Cuba	Cuban rebels		Rebellion suppressed		
1812	1812 Mendoza and Mojarra Conspiracy	Spanish Empire: Captaincy General of Santo Domingo	Dominican rebels		Rebellion suppressed		
1814	Norwegian War of Independence	Sweden; Supported by: (United Kingdom of Great Britain and Ireland) United Kingdom (naval blockade)	Norway		Swedish victory		
1814	Hadži Prodan's Revolt	Ottoman Empire	(Revolutionary Serbia) Serbian rebels		Rebellion suppressed		
1815	George Boxley's slave rebellion in Spotsylvania County, Virginia	United States	Slave rebels		Planned rebellion suppressed		
1815–1817	Second Serbian uprising	Ottoman Empire	Serbian rebels		Strategic Serbian diplomatic victory; Establishment of the autonomous Principality of Serbia		
1816	Bussa's rebellion	British Empire: British Leeward Islands	Slave rebels		Rebellion suppressed		
1816–1858	Seminole Wars	United States	Seminole; Yuchi; Choctaw; Freedmen		Natives and Freedmen forcefully relocated.		
1817	Pernambucan Revolt	United Kingdom of Portugal, Brazil and the Algarves	Rebels of Pernambuco and allies from Paraíba and Ceará.		Portuguese victory and resulted in the creation of the short-lived Republic of Pernambuco (7 March 1817 – 20 May 1817).		
1817	Pentrich rising,	(United Kingdom of Great Britain and Ireland) United Kingdom	Rebels led by William Oliver		Rebellion suppressed		
1817	Paika Rebellion	East India Company: Bengal Presidency	Bhoi dynasty		Rebellion suppressed		
1817–1818	Uva-Wellassa Rebellion	United Kingdom of Great Britain and Ireland Radala collaborators	Kingdom of Kandy rebels		Rebellion suppressed		
1820	The Revolutions of 1820 were a wave of revolutions attempting to establish liberal constitutional monarchies in Italy, Spain and Portugal.						
1820	Radical War	(United Kingdom of Great Britain and Ireland) United Kingdom	Various Groups		Rebellion suppressed		
1820–1822	Ecuadorian War of Independence	Royalists: (Spain) Spanish Monarchy: Viceroyalty of Peru; Real Audiencia of Quito	Patriots: Guayaquil; Gran Colombia; Chile; Peru; United Provinces		Patriot victory. Annexation of the territory to Gran Colombia.		
1820–1824	The revolutionary war of independence in Peru led by José de San Martín						
1821	Marcos Xiorro's conspiracy to incite a slave revolt in Spanish Puerto Rico	Spain	Rebels				
1821	Wallachian uprising	Ottoman Empire: Danubian Sich; Arnauts; Austrian Empire: (Ottoman Empire) Moldavian insurgents	Greek revolutionaries: Filiki Eteria; Sacred Band; Arnauts	Wallachia (revolutionary): (Wallachia) Wallachian Divan (conservative); Arnauts	Ottoman military victory Wallachian political victory End of the Phanariote Era		
1821–1829	Greek War of Independence	Ottoman Empire: Egypt; Algiers; Tripolitania; Tunis; Danubian Sich	1821: Greek Revolutionaries; Klephts; Armatoloi; Filiki Eteria (1821); Sacred Band (1821); Messenian Senate (1821); Peloponnesian Senate (1821–1823); Senate of Western Continental Greece (1821–1823); Areopagus of Eastern Continental Greece (1821–1823); Temporary Regime of Crete; Military-Political System of Samos; After 1822: First Hellenic Republic; Military support: (First Hellenic Republic) Philhellenes; Italian revolutionaries; Serbian revolutionaries; Romanian revolutionaries; Russian Empire; Kingdom of France; United Kingdom; Diplomatic support: Haiti; United States		Greek victory		
1822	Denmark Vesey's suppressed slave uprising in South Carolina	United States	Slave rebels		Rebellion suppressed		
1822–1823	The republican revolution in Mexico overthrows Emperor Agustín de Iturbide	First Mexican Empire	Rebels		Rebel victory		
1822–1825	Brazilian War of Independence	United Kingdom of Portugal, Brazil and the Algarves: Kingdom of Portugal and the Algarves; Kingdom of Brazil	Brazilian rebels (1822); Empire of Brazil		Brazilian victory		
1823	Demerara rebellion of 1823	(United Kingdom of Great Britain and Ireland) British Empire: British Guiana	Rebel slaves		Rebellion suppressed		
1824	Chumash revolt of 1824	First Mexican Republic	Chumash Native Americans				
1825	Decembrist revolt	Russian Empire	Northern Society of the Decembrists		Rebellion suppressed, Decembrists executed or deported to Siberia		
1825–1830	Java War	Dutch Empire Yogyakarta Sultanate	Javanese rebels		Dutch victory		
1826	Auspicious Incident	Ottoman Empire	Janissaries		Rebellion suppressed		
1826–1827	Fredonian Rebellion	First Mexican Republic	Texian rebels		Rebellion suppressed		
1826–1828	Lao rebellion	Rattanakosin Kingdom (Siam)	Kingdom of Vientiane Kingdom of Champasak Military support: Nguyễn dynasty (Note: Vietnamese observers totaled 80-100.)		Siamese victory		
1827–1828	The failed conservative rebellion in Mexico led by Nicolás Bravo.	First Mexican Republic	rebels led by Nicolás Bravo		Rebellion suppressed		
1828–1834	Liberal Wars	Miguelites Supported by: Spain (1832–1833); Russia	Liberals Supported by: Spain (1833–1834); United Kingdom; France (1830–1834); Belgian volunteers (1832–1834)		Liberal victory		
1829	Bathurst War	United Kingdom	Wiradjuri		British victory		
1829–1832	War of the Maidens. Countrymen dressed as women resisted the new forestry law, which restricted their use of the forest	France (Bourbon Restoration) (until 1830) France (July Monarchy) (from 1830)	rebels				
1830	The Revolutions of 1830 were a wave of Romantic nationalist revolutions in Europe						
1830–1831	Belgian Revolution	United Netherlands	Belgian rebels; France (from 1831)		Belgian victory		
1830	July Revolution	France (Bourbon Restoration)	Middle class against Bourbon King Charles X		Charles X which forced him out of office and replaced him with the Orleanist King Louis-Philippe (the "July Monarchy")		
1830–1831	November uprising	(Russia) Russian Empire	Congress Poland: National Government		Russian victory		
1830	Ustertag revolution	Canton of Zürich	Rebels				
1830	Bathurst Rebellion	United Kingdom: Colony of New South Wales	Convict rebels				
1830–1833	Yagan's War	United Kingdom	Noongar people				
1830–1836	Tithe War	United Kingdom	Irish Demonstrators				
1831	Nat Turner's slave rebellion	United States	Insurgents		Rebellion suppressed		
1831	Merthyr Rising	United Kingdom	Working class				
1831, 1834, 1848	Canut revolts	France (July Monarchy)	Lyonnais silk workers (French: canuts)				
1831–1832	Bosnian uprising	Ottoman Empire	Bosnian ayans		Ottoman victory		
1831–1832	Baptist War	United Kingdom: Colony of Jamaica	Slave rebels		Rebellion suppressed		
1832	June Rebellion	France (July Monarchy): National Guards; Regular Army	Republicans		Rebellion suppressed		
1832–1833	Anastasio Aquino's Rebellion	Federal Republic of Central America: El Salvador	Indigenous rebels		Rebellion suppressed		
1832–1843	Abdelkader's rebellion in French-occupied Algeria	France (July Monarchy)	Rebels led by Abdelkader				
1833–1835	Lê Văn Khôi revolt	Nguyễn dynasty	Lê Văn Khôi rebels Supported by: Rattanakosin Kingdom (Siam)		Rebellion suppressed		
1834	Flores' Rebellion	Nicaragua	Rebels				
1834–1859	Imam Shamil's rebellion in Russian-occupied Caucasus	(Russia) Russian Empire	Rebels				
1835–1836	Texas Revolution	Mexican Republic	Republic of Texas		De facto Texian independence from the Centralist Republic of Mexico		
1835	Malê revolt	Empire of Brazil: National Guard	Malê slaves (primarily Nagôs)		Rebellion suppressed		
1835–1840	The Cabanagem	Empire of Brazil	Cabanos		Rebellion suppressed		
1835–1845	Ragamuffin War	Empire of Brazil; National Guard; Imperial Navy	Piratini Republic; Juliana Republic; Supported by: Colorados Unitarians		Peace treaty between both parties: The Juliana Republic and the Riograndense Republic are dissolved and reintegrated into the Empire.		
1837	Río Arriba Rebellion	Republic of Mexico: Territory of New Mexico	Pueblo peoples Hispanos		Temporary success: Taos Pueblo José María González and Pablo Montoya lead the Cantón de Nuevo México during the Rio Arriba Rebellion of 1837.		
1837-1838	Rebellions of 1837-1838	Upper Canada Lower Canada	Hunter's Lodges (Upper Canada): Republic of Canada; Patriotes (Lower Canada): Republic of Lower Canada		Rebels defeated in both Upper and Lower Canada Upper and Lower Canada unified into the single Province of Canada		
1837-1838	Sabinada	Empire of Brazil: Bahia Province	Bahia Republic, led by Francisco Sabino		Government victory; rebel capital of Salvador captured after four months of resistance		
1838-1841	Balaida	Empire of Brazil: Maranhão Province	Rebels: Balaios; African slaves		Government victory		
1839	Amistad Rebellion	Amistad slave ship	Slaves		Initial slave victory, eventual capture of slaves by the United States United States v. The Amistad supreme court decision		
1839-1843	Rebecca Riots	Wales	Farmers and agricultural workers		End in riots due to increased military presence Act of Parliament amends laws relating to turnpike trusts		
1841	Creole revolt	Creole American slave ship	Slaves		Revolt successful		
1841-1842	Dorr Rebellion	Rhode Island	Disenfranchised voters led by Thomas Wilson Dorr		Military government victory Land qualification to vote removed from the state constitution		
1841-1842	Afghan uprising	Kabul, Emirate of Kabul: Under occupation by British forces under William Elphinstone during the First Anglo-Afghan War	Afghan citizens of Kabul		Afghan victory: British forces retreat from Kabul to Jalalabad; Most British soldiers and civilians killed or captured; Elphinstone captured as a POW		
1842	Slave Revolt in the Cherokee Nation	Cherokee Nation	Slaves		Slaves eventually captured and some executed		
1844–1856	Dominican War of Independence	Dominican Republic	Republic of Haiti (1844–1849); Second Empire of Haiti (1854–1856)		Dominican victory		
1845-1872	New Zealand Wars	New Zealand	Māori iwi		Eventual British victory 16000 km^{2} of Māori land seized in New Zealand Settlements Act of 1863		
1846	Greater Poland uprising	Greater Poland: Prussia; Russian Empire (planned); Austrian Empire (planned)	Poles		Planned revolution never goes through 8 rebels executed		
1846	Kraków uprising	Free City of Kraków, Austrian Empire	Polish resistance		Austrian victory		
1846	Bear Flag Revolt	Alta California, Mexico	California Republic		California Republic declared, soon annexed by United States		
1847-1901	Caste War of Yucatán	Yucatán Peninsula, Mexico and British Honduras	Maya people: Chan Santa Cruz		Initial Mayan victory, eventual defeat: Maya state of Chan Santa Cruz established; Eventual recapture of Yucatán peninsula by Mexican and British forces		
1847	The Taos Revolt	New Mexico, United States	Hispano and Puebloan rebels		American strategic victory Mexican tactical victory		
1847	Sonderbund War	Sonderbund	Swiss Confederation		Confederate victory		
1848	French Revolution of 1848	Monarchy of France	Revolutionaries		Revolutionary victory: Abdication of King Louis Philippe; Creation of the Second French Republic		
1848-1849	German revolutions of 1848-1849	German Confederation	Revolutionaries The quasi-state of the German Empire		Rebellion quelled		
1848	Revolutions of 1848 in the Italian states	Various states in the Italian peninsula	Revolutionaries		Revolutionaries defeated		
1848	Revolutions of 1848 in the Austrian Empire	Austrian Empire	Revolutionaries		Counterrevolutionary victory: Abdication of Ferdinand I; Abolition of serfdom; Cancellation of censorship		
1848	March Unrest	Sweden	Armed protesters		Rebellion quelled		
1848	Prague uprising	Prague under the Austrian Empire	Rebels		Rebellion defeated		
1848	Greater Poland uprising	Kingdom of Prussia	Rebels seeking Polish independence		Rebellion defeated		
1848	Young Ireland rebellion	Ireland under the United Kingdom of Great Britain and Ireland	Young Irelanders		Rebellion defeated		
1848-1849	Serb uprising of 1848–1849	Southern Kingdom of Hungary	Serbian Vojvodina		Rebel victory: Serbian autonomy achieved		
1848	Wallachian Revolution of 1848	Wallachia	Liberal and nationalist revolutionaries		Counter-revolutionary victory		
1848	Moldavian Revolution of 1848	Moldavia	Liberal and nationalist revolutionaries		Counter-revolutionary victory		
1848	Matale rebellion	British Ceylon	Kandyan rebels		British victory		
1848-1849	Praieira revolt	Empire of Brazil	Praieiros		Imperial victory		

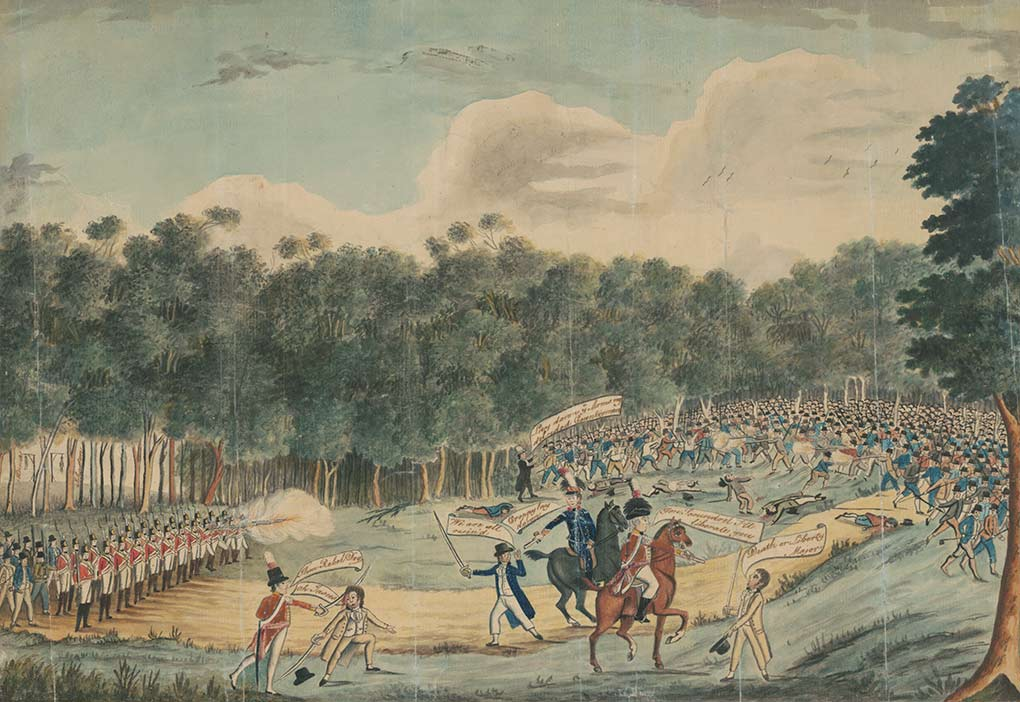
Castle Hill convict rebellion (1804): The Battle of Vinegar Hill.

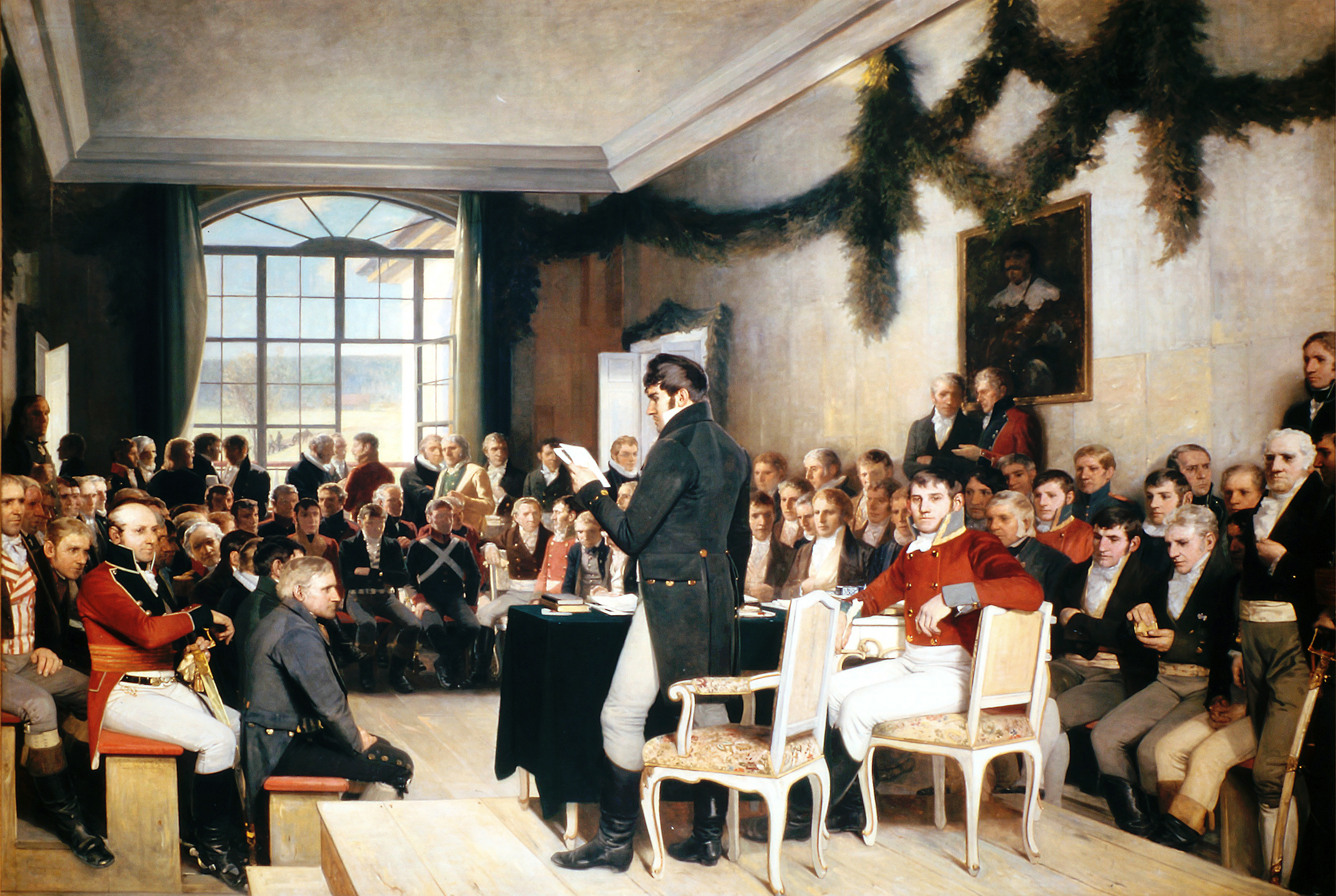
Norwegian Constituent Assembly in 1814

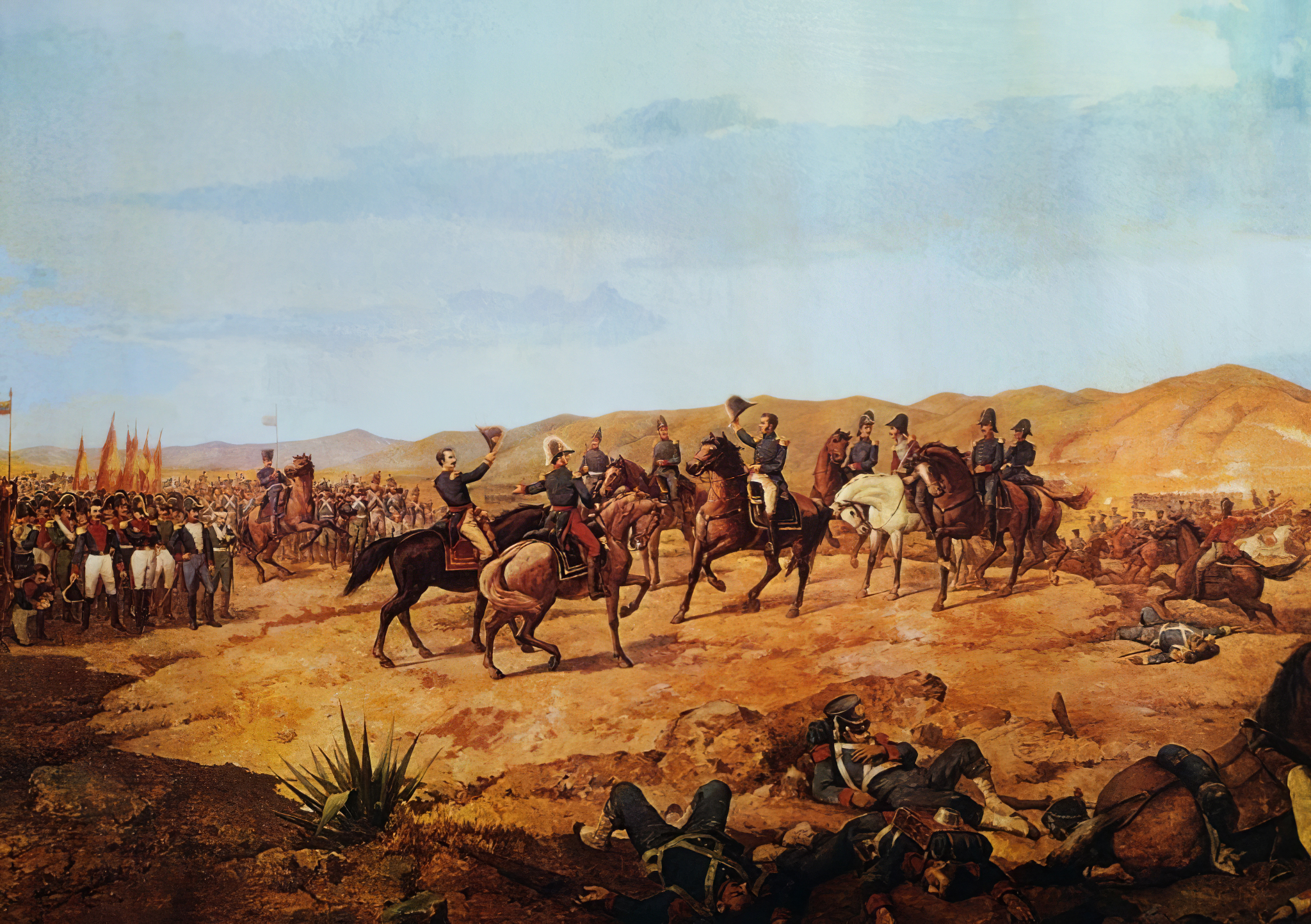
The defeat of the Spanish army at Ayacucho on 9 December 1824 was the definitive end of Spain's empire on the South America mainland.

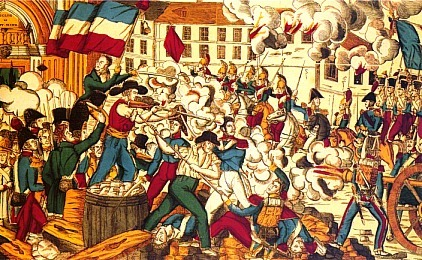
Fighting in the streets of Lyon during the 1831 revolt

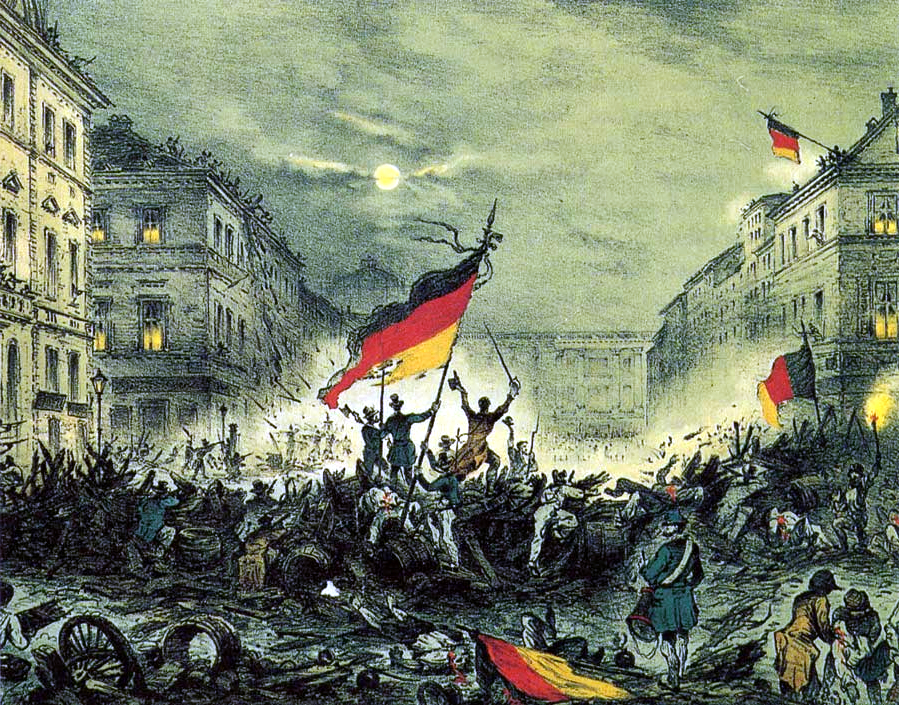
Cheering revolutionaries in Berlin during the Revolutions of 1848, Berlin Palace in the background

== 1850–1899 ==
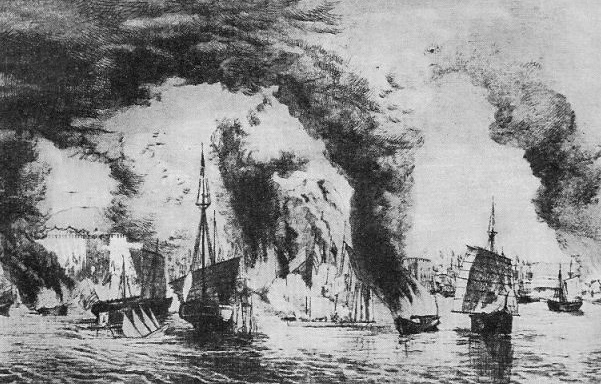
Battle of the Yangtze during the Taiping Rebellion.

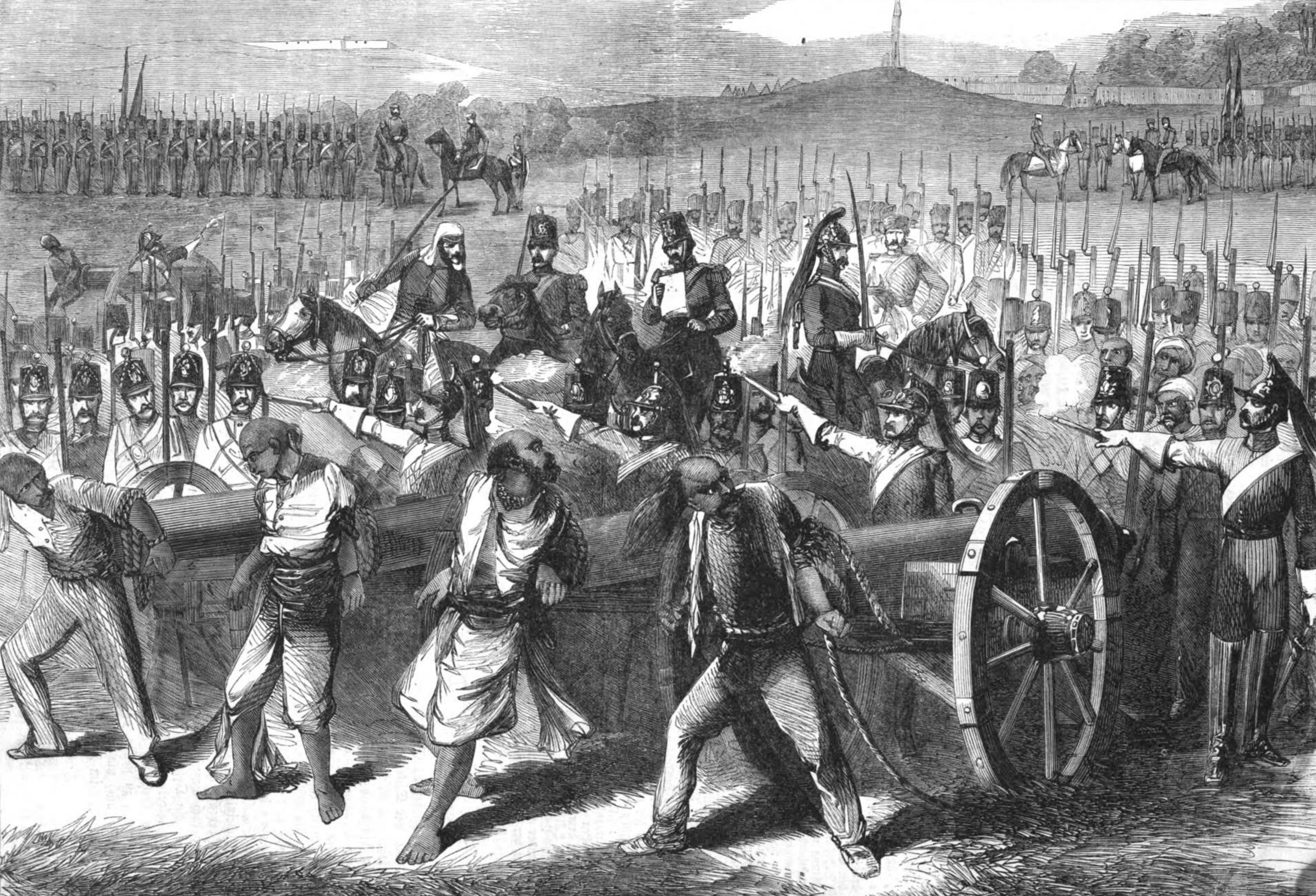
A scene from the Indian Rebellion of 1857. Execution of mutineers by blowing from a gun by the British, 8 September 1857.

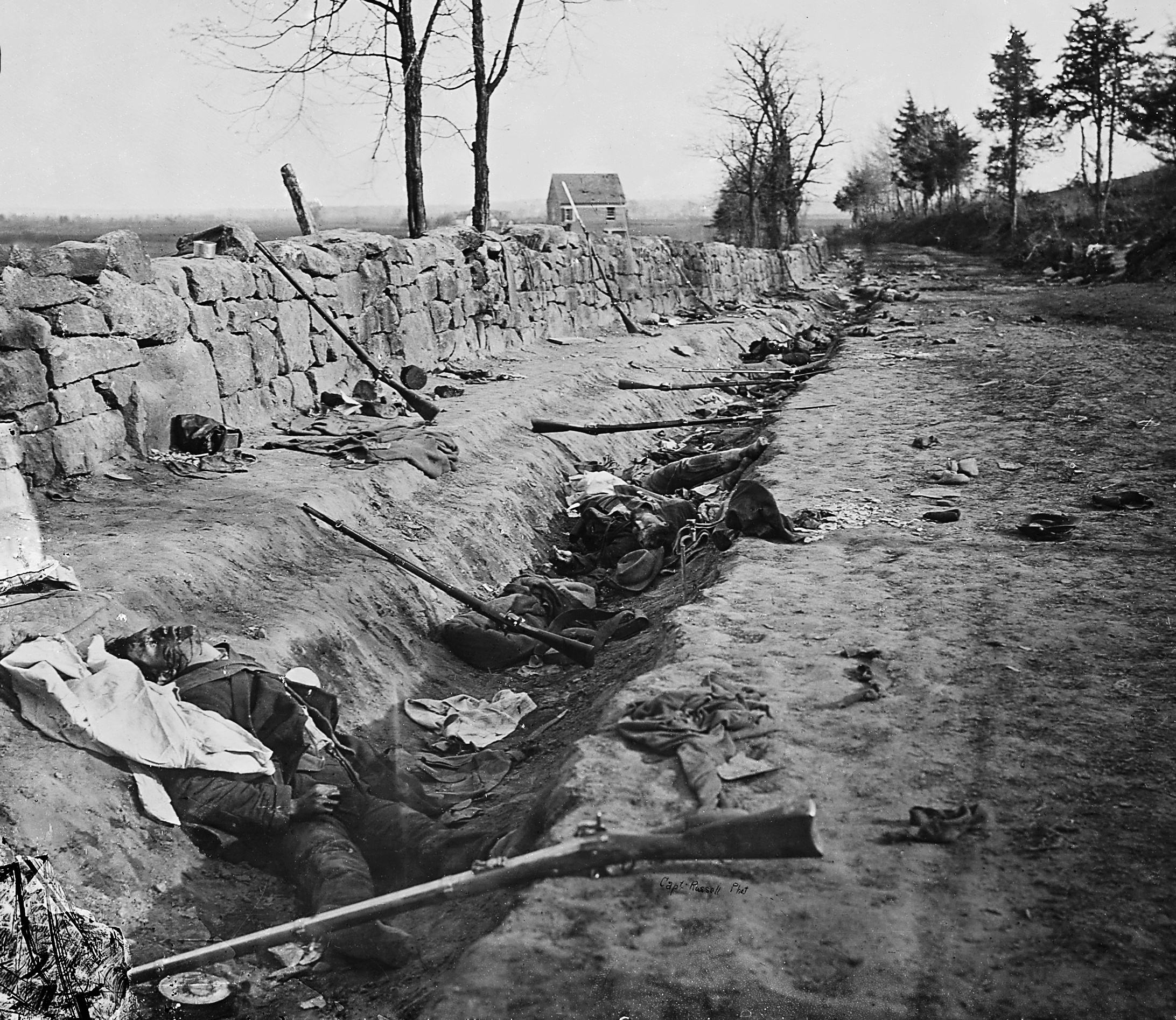
Confederate soldiers killed behind wall during the Battle of Chancellorsville of the American Civil War.

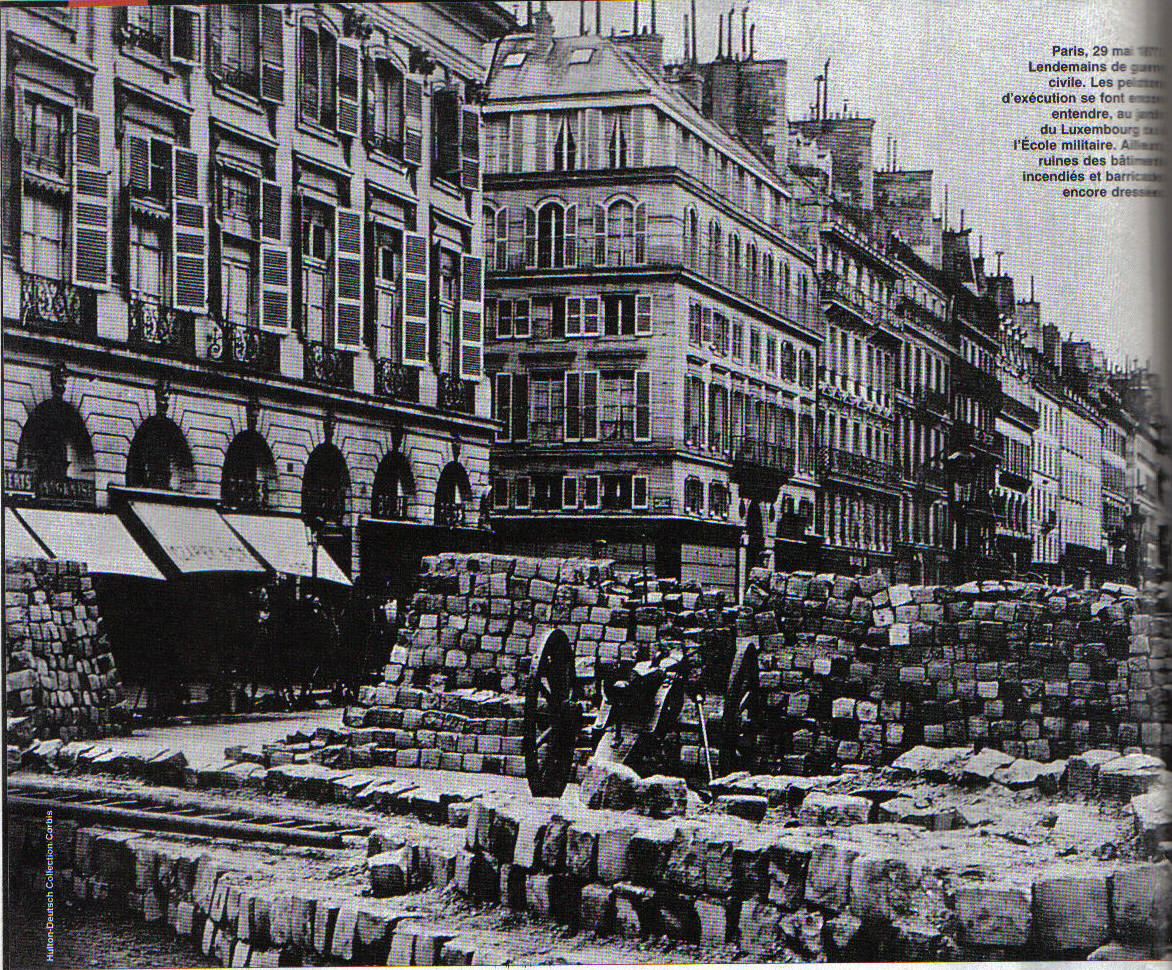
Paris Commune, 29 May 1871

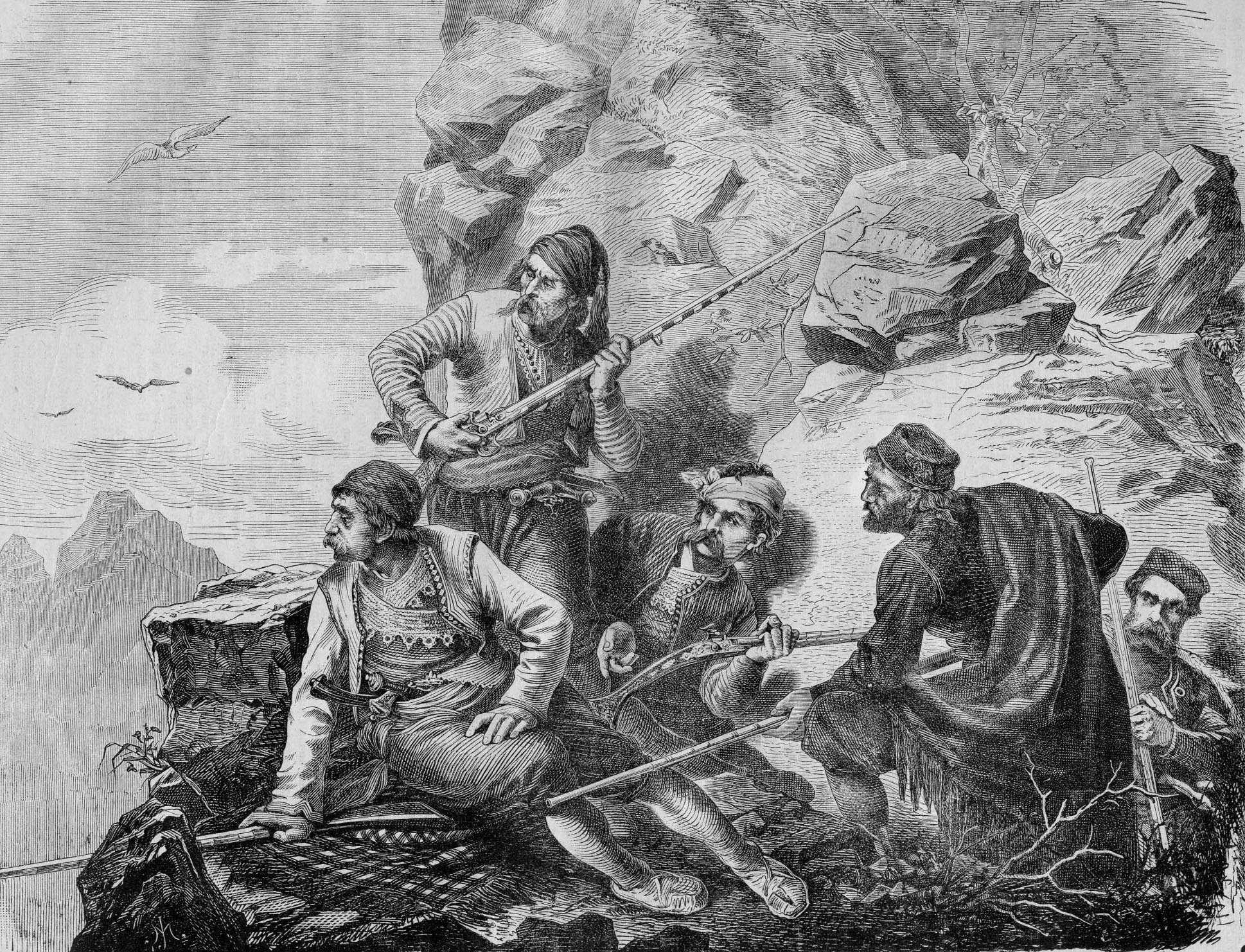
The Herzegovina uprising of 1875–1877 was an uprising led by Christian population, mostly Serbs, against the Ottoman Empire

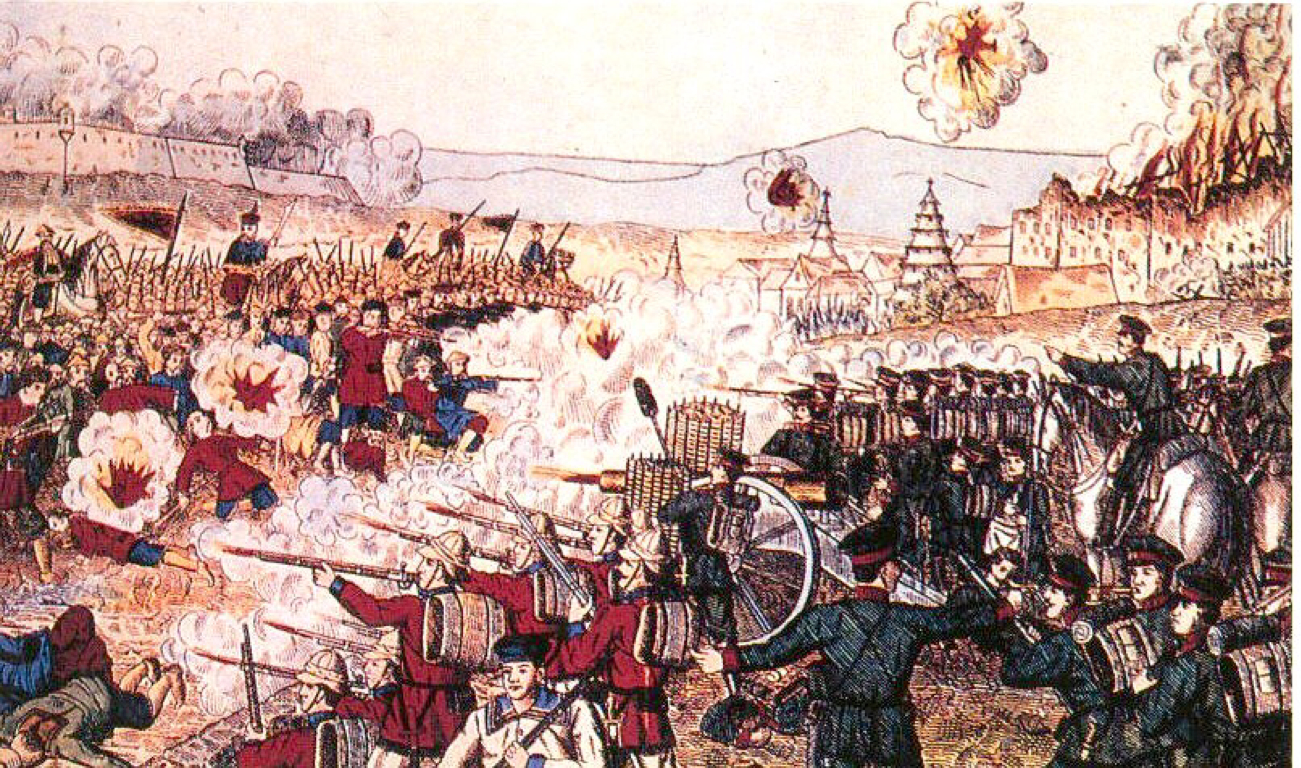
Boxer Rebellion fighting Eight-Nation Alliance

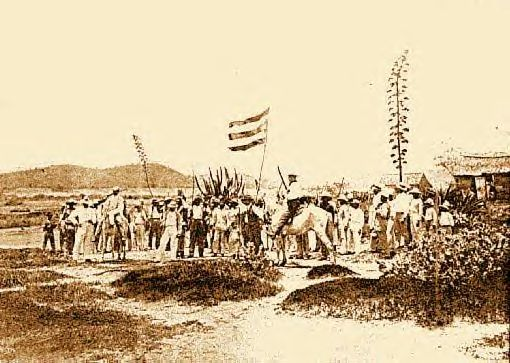
The current Puerto Rican Flag was flown for the first time in Puerto Rico by Fidel Vélez and his men during the "Intentona de Yauco" revolt

Date	Revolution/Rebellion	Location	Revolutionaries/Rebels	Result	Image	Ref
1851-64	Taiping Rebellion	China	God Worshippers	Rebellion suppressed		
1852	Kautokeino rebellion	Sweden–Norway	Sámi rebels	Rebellion suppressed		
1852-62	Herzegovina Uprising	Ottoman Empire	Herzegovinian rebels Supported by Montenegro	Rebellion suppressed		
1853-55	Small Swords Society	China	Small Swords Society	Rebellion suppressed		
1854	Spanish Revolution of 1854	Spain: Moderate Party	Progressive Party Democratic Party	Progressive Victory		
1854	Eureka Rebellion	Australia	Gold miners	Rebellion suppressed		
1854-56	Mỹ Lương Uprising	Vietnam	Peasants aligned with Cao Ba Quat	Rebellion suppressed		
1854-56	Red Turban Rebellion	China	Red Turban rebels	Rebellion suppressed		
1854-73	Miao Rebellion (1854-73)	China	Miao rebels	Rebellion suppressed		
1854-55	Revolution of Ayutla	Mexico	Liberal Party (Mexico)	Revolutionary victory		
1855-1856	Karakalpak Rebellion	Khanate of Khiva	Karakalpak rebels	Rebellion suppressed		
1855-73	Panthay Rebellion	China	Muslim Hui rebels	Rebellion suppressed		
1857	Indian Rebellion of 1857 (Note: The name of the rebellion is contested.)	United Kingdom: East India Company	Mughal Empire Sepoy Mutineers; Oudh State; Rampur	British victory		
1858	Mahtra War	Russia	Estonian peasants at Mahtra manor	Rebellion suppressed		
1858	Pecija's First Revolt	Ottoman Empire	Serb peasants	Rebellion suppressed		
1858-61	Reform War	Mexico: Liberal Party	Conservative Party	Liberal Victory		
1859	John Brown's raid on Harper's Ferry	United States	John Brown's raiders Secret Six; Abolitionists	Rebellion suppressed		
1859	Second Italian War of Independence	Austria	Lombardy-Venetia Supported by France; Sardinia	Lombardy annexed by Sardinia		
1861-65	American Civil War	United States	Confederate States: Quantrill's Raiders	Rebellion suppressed		
1863-65	Free State of Jones secession	Confederate States	Free State of Jones	Rebels rejoined United States after the American Civil War ended		
1862	Dakota War of 1862	United States	Dakota rebels	Rebellion suppressed		
1862-77	Dungan Revolt (1862-1877)	China	Yettishar Dungan rebels	Rebellion suppressed		
1862	Expulsion of Otto of Greece	Greece: Otto of Greece	Popular insurrection	George I is appointed king		
1863	New York Draft Riots	United States	Rioters	Rebellion suppressed		
1863-64	January Uprising	Russia	Polish National Government Garibaldi Legion	Rebellion suppressed		
1863-65	Dominican Restoration War	Spain	Dominican Republic	Dominican victory		
1864-65	Mejba Revolt	Tunis Supported by France; United Kingdom; Ottoman Empire	Rahmaniyya rebels	Rebellion suppressed		
1865	Morant Bay rebellion	Jamaica	Supporters of Paul Bogle	Rebellion suppressed		
1866	Baikal Insurrection	Russia	Siberian Legion of Free Poles	Rebellion suppressed		
1866-68	Meiji Restoration	Tokugawa	Samurai coup	Empire of Japan established		
1867	Fenian Rising	United Kingdom	Irish Republican Brotherhood: Fenian Brotherhood	Rebellion suppressed		
1868	Glorious Revolution	Spain	Revolutionaries: Liberal Union; Progressive Party; Democratic Party	Isabella II expelled		
1868	Grito de Lares	Spain: Captaincy General of Puerto Rico	Republic of Puerto Rico: Puerto Rico Liberation Army	Rebellion suppressed		
1868-74	Six Years' War	Dominican Republic: Red Party (Conservatives)	Blue Party (Liberals)	Overthrow of Buenaventura Báez		
1868-78	Ten Years' War	Spain: Captaincy General of Cuba	Republic of Cuba in Arms	Signing of the Pact of Zanjón		
1869	Red River Rebellion	Canada: Canadian Party	Provisional Government of Rupert's Land and the North-West	Canadian military victory		
1870-72	Revolution of the Lances	Uruguay: Colorado Party	National Party	Power-sharing agreement		
1870-71	Lyon Commune	France	Lyon Commune	Rebellion suppressed		
1871	Paris Commune	France	Paris Commune	Rebellion suppressed		
1871-72	Plan de la Noria	Mexico: President Benito Juárez	Supporters of Porfirio Díaz	Rebels failed, later pardoned		
1871	1871 Guatemalan Revolution	Guatemala: Conservative Party	Liberal Party	Revolution successful		
1873	Petroleum Revolution	Spain	Committee of Public Safety	Rebellion suppressed		
1873-74	Cantonal Rebellion	Spain	Cantonalists Internationalists	Rebellion suppressed		
1873	Khivan slave uprising	Khanate of Khiva	Slave rebels Supported by Russia (End of rebellion)	Slavery banned, Khiva subjugated by Russia		
1875	Deccan Riots	East India Company	Peasant rioters	Debts burned, relief imposed		
1875	Stara Zagora Uprising	Ottoman Empire	Bulgarian rebels	Rebellion suppressed		
1875-76	Svaneti uprising of 1875–1876	Russia	Svan rebels	Rebellion suppressed		
1875-78	The Great Eastern Crisis was a series of revolutions against the Ottoman Empire supported by various European powers between 1875 and 1878.					
1875-77	Herzegovina Uprising (1875-1878)	Ottoman Empire: Ottoman Bosnia	Serb rebels in Herzegovina Supported by Montenegro; Serbia	Rebellion suppressed		
1876	Plan of Tuxtepec	Mexico: President Sebastián Lerdo de Tejada	Supporters of Porfirio Díaz	Rebellion successful		
1876	April uprising	Ottoman Empire	Bulgarian Revolutionary Central Committee	Rebellion suppressed		
1876	Razlovci uprising	Ottoman Empire	Macedonian rebels	Rebellion suppressed		
1876-78	Serbian-Turkish Wars (1876-1878)	Ottoman Empire: Albanian volunteers	Serbia Bulgarian volunteers Italian volunteers Finnish volunteers Supported by Montenegro; Russia	Serbian victory		
1876-78	Montenegrin-Ottoman War (1876-78)	Ottoman Empire	Montenegro Finnish volunteers	Montenegrin victory		
1877	Satsuma Rebellion	Japan	Satsuma	Rebellion suppressed		
1877	Banda del Matese	Italy	Banda del Matese	Rebellion suppressed		
1877-78	Romanian War of Independence	Ottoman Empire	United Principalities Supported by Russia	Romanian victory		
1878	Kumanovo Uprising	Ottoman Empire	Serb rebels	Rebellion suppressed		
1878	Kresna-Razlog uprising	Ottoman Empire	Unity Committee Bulgarian rebels	Rebellion suppressed		
1878	1878 Greek Macedonian rebellion	Ottoman Empire	Greek revolutionaries in Macedonia	Rebellion suppressed		
1878	Epirus Revolt of 1878	Ottoman Empire	Greek revolutionaries in Epirus	Rebellion suppressed		
1878	Cretan revolt (1878)	Ottoman Empire	Greek revolutionaries in Crete	Rebellion suppressed		
1879	Little War (Cuba)	Spain	Cuban rebels	Rebellion suppressed		
1879-82	Urabi Revolt	Egypt Supported by United Kingdom; East India Company	Supporters of Ahmed Urabi	Rebellion suppressed		
1880-1881	Brsjak revolt	Ottoman Empire	Christian rebels	Rebellion suppressed		
1883	Timok Rebellion	Serbia	People's Radical Party National Militia	Rebellion suppressed		
1885-87	Huaraz Rebellion	Peru	Quechua rebels	Rebellion suppressed		
1885-96	Cần Vương movement	France: Vietnam	Vietnamese rebels: Hàm Nghi	Rebellion suppressed		
1885	North-West Rebellion	Canada	Métis rebels in Saskatchewan	Rebellion suppressed		
1885	Unification of Bulgaria	Ottoman Empire	Eastern Rumelia	Eastern Rumelia annexed by Bulgaria		
1889	Republican Revolution	Brazil	Republicans	Monarchy abolished		
1890	Revolution of the Park	Argentina	Civic Union	Rebellion suppressed		
1892	Jerez uprising	Spain	Peasant rebels	Rebellion suppressed		
1893	Argentine Revolution of 1893	Argentina	Radical Civic Union	Rebellion suppressed		
1893	Liberal revolt	Nicaragua	Liberal Party: José Santos Zelaya	Rebellion successful		
1894	Lunigiana revolt	Italy	Supporters of the Fasci Siciliani	Rebellion suppressed		
1894-95	Tonghak Peasant Revolution	Korea Supported by China	Tonghak	Rebellion suppressed, Japan occupies various parts of Korea		
1895	Aristocratic Republic Revolution	Peru	Opposition to Andrés Avelino Cáceres	Rebellion suppressed		
1895-96	War of Canudos	Brazil	Inhabitants of Canudos	Rebellion suppressed		
1895-96	First Italo-Ethiopian War	Italy	Ethiopia	Ethiopian victory		
1895-98	Cuban War of Independence	Spain: Captaincy General of Cuba	Republic of Cuba in Arms	Cuba subjugated by the United States		
1896	Yaqui Uprising	Mexico United States	Yaqui	Rebellion suppressed		
1896-99	Philippine Revolution	Spain	Katipunan	Philippines subjugated by the United States		
1897	Intentona de Yauco	Spain	Revolutionary Committee of Puerto Rico	Rebellion suppressed		
1898	Andijan uprising of 1898	Russia	Kyrgyz rebels Uzbek rebels	Rebellion suppressed		
1898	Hut Tax War	Sierra Leone	Temne and Mende rebels	Rebellion suppressed		
1898	Dog Tax War	New Zealand	Armed Māori protestors	Rebellion suppressed		
1898	Wilmington massacre	United States: North Carolina	White supremacist coup	Coup remains in power		
1899	Tancament de caixes	Spain	Tax strikers	Rebellion suppressed		
1899-1902	Philippine-American War	United States	Philippines	Rebellion suppressed		
1899-1901	Boxer Rebellion	Eight-Nation Alliance: United Kingdom; Russia; Japan; France; Germany; United States; Italy; Austria-Hungary; Supported by Netherlands; Spain; Belgium; Portugal	Boxers Supported by China	Rebellion suppressed		
1899-1962	Mau movement	Samoa (1899-1914) Territory of Western Samoa (from 1914)	Native Samoans	Samoan independence granted in 1962		

== 1900s ==
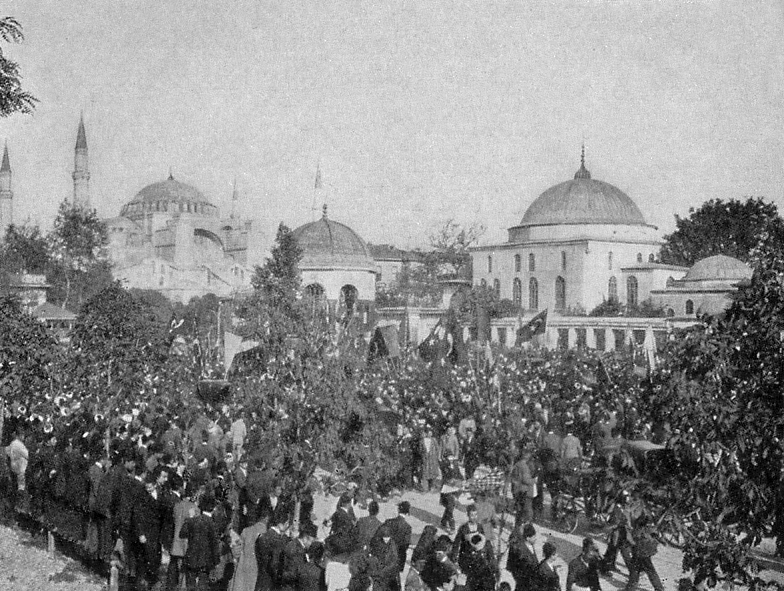
Demonstrations in Istanbul during the Young Turk Revolution

- 1900: The War of the Golden Stool was a resistance by the Asante of West Africa against the imposition of colonial rule by the United Kingdom.
- 1901–1936: Holy Man's Rebellion.
- 1903: The Ilinden–Preobrazhenie Uprising breaks out in the Ottoman Empire.
- 1904: Revolution of 1904
- 1904: A liberal revolution in Paraguay.
- 1904–1908: Macedonian Struggle.
- 1904–1908: Herero Wars in German South-West Africa.
- 1905: Argentine Revolution of 1905.
- 1905–1906: The Persian/Iranian Constitutional Revolution.
- 1905–1906: The Maji Maji Rebellion in German East Africa.
- 1905: Shoubak Revolt.
- 1905: Łódź insurrection.
- 1905–1907: Revolution in the Kingdom of Poland (1905–07).
- 1905–1906: 1905 Tibetan Rebellion.
- 1905–1907: 1905 Russian Revolution, which was abortive and ultimately crushed, though forming the critical precedent for the 1917 Russian Revolution.
- 1906: Bambatha Rebellion by the Zulus of southern Africa against British rule.
- 1906–1908: Theriso revolt.
- 1907: The Romanian Peasants' Revolt.
- 1908: The Young Turk Revolution: Young Turks force the autocratic ruler Abdul Hamid II to restore parliament and constitution in the Ottoman Empire.
- 1909: HNLMS De Zeven Provinciën (1909).
- 1909: Hauran Druze Rebellion.

== 1910s ==
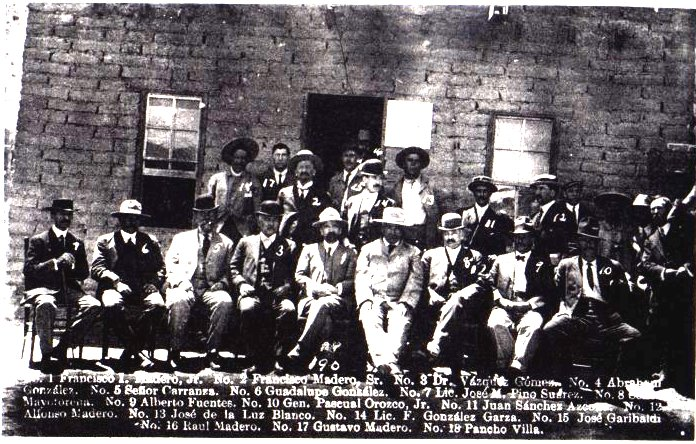
Leaders of the 1910 revolt after the First Battle of Juárez. Seen are José María Pino Suárez, Venustiano Carranza, Francisco I. Madero (and his father), Pascual Orozco, Pancho Villa, Gustavo A. Madero, Raul Madero, Abraham González, and Giuseppe Garibaldi II

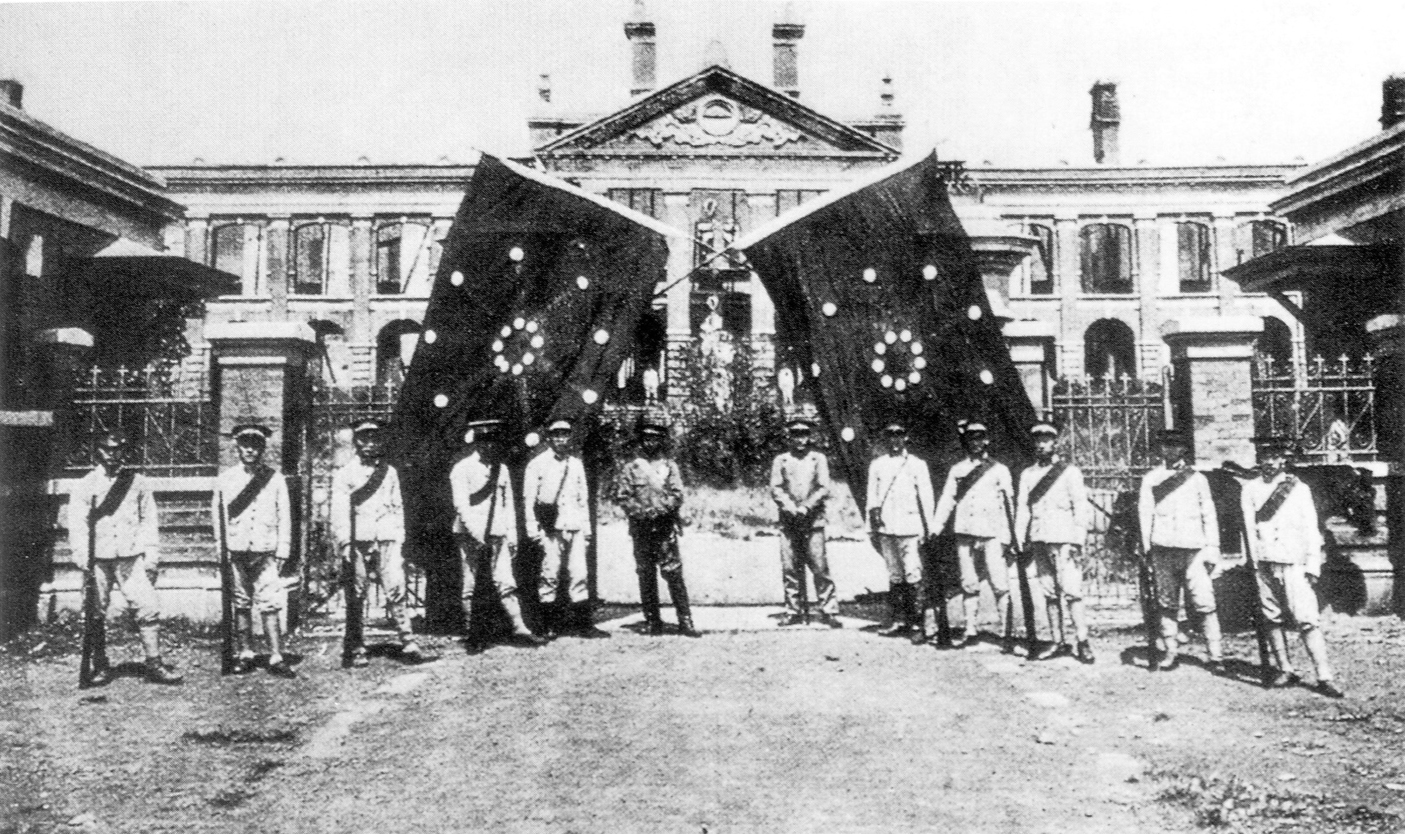
Establishment of Republic of China Hubei Military Government on 11 October 1911, the day after Wuchang uprising

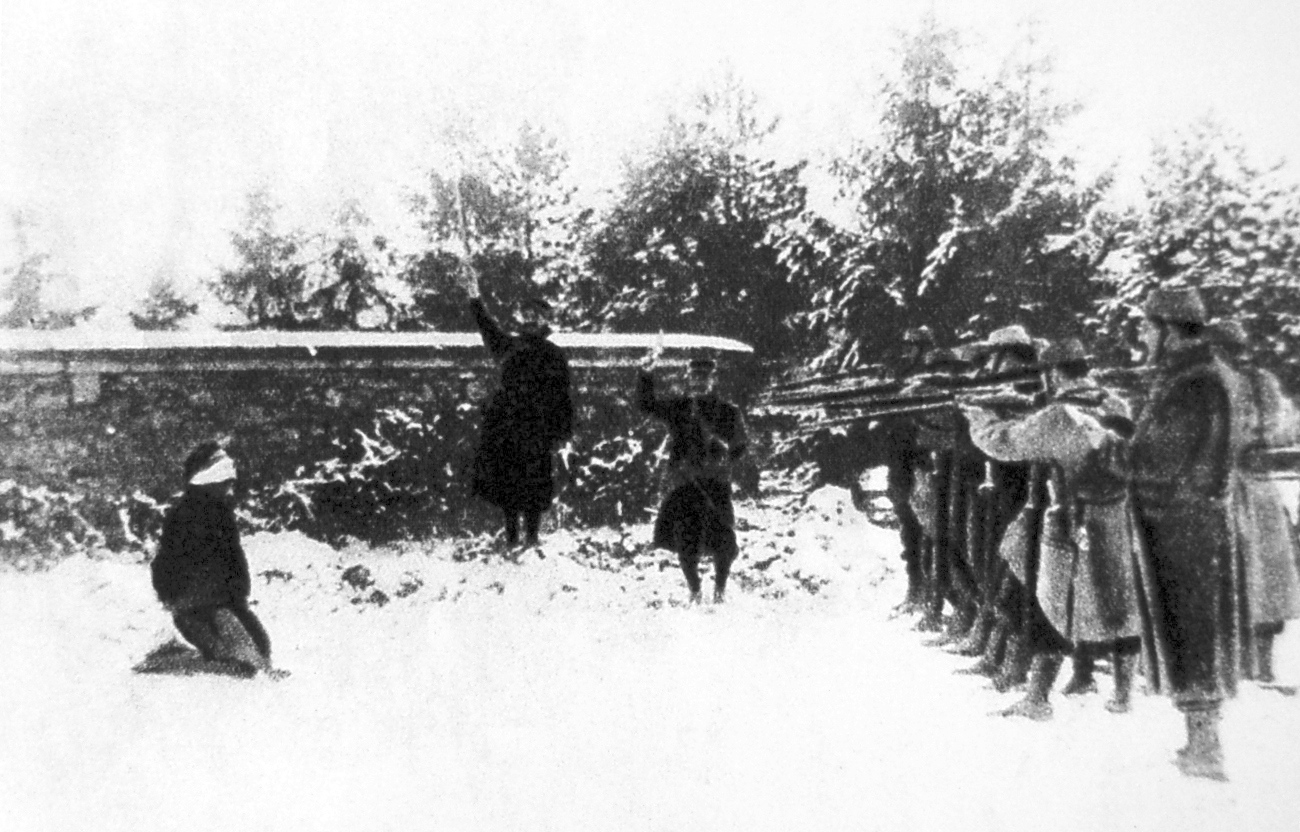
1917 – Execution at Verdun during the winter of 1916

- 1910: The republican revolution in Portugal.
- 1910–1920: The Mexican Revolution overthrows the dictator Porfirio Díaz; seizure of power by the National Revolutionary Party (later called Institutional Revolutionary Party).
- 1910: The Albanian Revolt of 1910 against Ottoman centralization policies in Albania.
- 1910–1911: The Sokehs Rebellion erupts in German-ruled Micronesia. Its primary leader, Somatau, is executed soon after being captured.
- 1911–1912: The Xinhai Revolution overthrows the ruling Qing dynasty and establishment of the Republic of China.
- 1911–1912: The East Timorese rebellion against colonial Portugal.
- 1911–1912: The Dominican Civil War (1911–1912) against the Dominican Government.
- 1912: The Albanian Revolt of 1912 against Ottoman Empire rule in Albania.
- 1912-1916: The Contestado War was a guerrilla war for land between settlers and landowners in South Brazil.
- 1913: The Second Revolution against President Yuan Shikai of China.
- 1914: The Ten Days War was a shooting war involving irregular forces of coal miners using dynamite and rifles on one side, opposed to the Colorado National Guard, Baldwin Felts detectives, and mine guards deploying machine guns, cannon and aircraft on the other, occurring in the aftermath of the Ludlow massacre. The Ten Days War ended when federal troops intervened.
- 1914: The Dominican Civil War (1914) against the Dominican Government.
- 1914: The revolt of Peasants of Central Albania overthrows Prince William of Wied.
- 1914–1915: The Boer Revolt against the British in South Africa.
- 1914–1915: Muslim rebellion in Krujë (Albania)
- 1915: The Armenian revolt in city of Van against the Ottomans in Turkey.
- 1915: Somba rebellion (Tammari people)
- 1915–1916: The National Protection War against the Empire of China headed by Emperor Yuan Shikai. The Republic of China was restored.
- 1915–1916: The Tapani incident is the last major Chinese uprising in Taiwan during the Japanese colonial era.
- 1916: The Easter Rising in Dublin, Ireland during which the Irish Republic was proclaimed.
- 1916: An anti-French uprising in Algeria.
- 1916: The Central Asian Revolt started when the Russian Empire government ended its exemption of Muslims from military service.
- 1916: Cochinchina uprising of Vietnam against French colonialism
- 1916–1917: The Tuareg rebellion against French colonial rule of the area around the Aïr Mountains of northern Niger.
- 1916–1918: The Arab Revolt with the aim of securing independence from the Ottoman Empire.
- 1916–1923: The Irish War of Independence, the period of nationalist rebellion, guerrilla warfare, political change and civil war which brought about the establishment of the independent nation, the Irish Free State. Sparking the Irish Civil War between pro-treaty forces and pro-republic forces
- 1916–1917: Ahmad bin Yahya revolt
- 1916–1947: The Indian people's struggle against the British for Indian Independence.
- 1917: Makonbe uprising
- 1917: The French Army Mutinies.
- 1917: Thái Nguyên uprising of Vietnam, led by Trinh Van Can, against French colonialism
- 1917: The February Revolution made Tsar Nicholas II abdicate and abolishes the Russian monarchy
- 1917: The Green Corn Rebellion takes place in rural Oklahoma.
- 1917: The October Revolution in Russia: Bolsheviks take over the provisional government of the Russian Republic, instituting the first socialist society in the world. The chaos leads to the final collapse of the Russian Empire as many peripheral territories declare independence and anti-Bolshevik forces rose in revolt against the new Soviet Russian order, sparking the Russian Civil War, eventually leading to the establishment of the Soviet Union.
- 1917–1921: The Ukrainian Revolution: Nationalists and Soviet allies both declare separate republics in Ukraine, fighting anarchists under Nestor Makhno as well as White forces loyal to the Ukrainian State, a German puppet state.
- 1918: The Finnish Civil War: Finnish Red Guards sympathetic to the Bolsheviks in Russia rise in revolt against the newly independent Finnish Whites, supported by the German Empire.
- 1918–1922: The Third Russian Revolution, a failed anarchist revolution against Bolshevism.
- 1918: The Rumburk rebellion
- 1918: The Uprising in the Kragujevac [cz]
- 1918: Czechoslovak coup in Dobruška By mistake the first attempt to declare the Czechoslovak Republic.
- 1918: General strike of 14 October 1918 [cz]
- 1918: Czechoslovak coup in Písek [cz] As a result of the October strike, the second mistake attempt to declare the Czechoslovak Republic.
- 1918: Czechoslovak coup in Prague Declaration the Czechoslovak Republic
- 1918: Aster Revolution ends Habsburg rule in Hungary
- 1918–1919: The German Revolution overthrows the Kaiser; establishment of the Weimar Republic after a brief socialist uprising by the Spartacists.
  - 1918: The Wilhelmshaven mutiny.
  - 1918: The Kiel mutiny
- 1918: Prešov revolt [sk]
- Simko Shikak revolt (1918–1922)
- 1918–1919: A wave of strikes and student unrest shakes Peru. These events influence two of the dominant figures of Peruvian politics in the 20th century: Víctor Raúl Haya de la Torre and José Carlos Mariátegui.
- 1918–1919: The Greater Poland Uprising, Polish uprising against German authorities.
- 1918: Rio de Janeiro anarchist insurrection in Brazil.
- 1918–1919: The 1919 Egyptian revolution against the British occupation of Egypt.
- 1918–1920: The Georgian–Ossetian conflict, the southern Ossetians revolted against Georgian rule.
- 1918–1931: The Basmachi Revolt against Soviet Russia rule in Central Asia.
- 1919: The Christmas uprising in Montenegro: Montenegrins (Zelenaši) rebelled against unification of the Kingdom of Montenegro with the Kingdom of Serbia.
- 1919: Sudet demonstrations [cz]
- 1919: Shooting in the Bratislava (1919) [sk]
- 1919: March 1st movement In Korea against the Japanese occupation (1910). Ultimately fails.
- 1919: Illegal 2nd Congress of Czechoslovak Legions (Yekaterinburg)
- 1919: The Sette Giugno (Malta)
- 1919-1920: The Biennio Rosso in Italy.
- 1919–1922: The Turkish War of Independence commanded by Mustafa Kemal Atatürk.
- 1919–1921: The Tambov Rebellion, one of the largest peasant rebellions against the Bolshevik regime during the Russian Civil War.
- 1919: Uprising in Železna Ruda [cz]
- 1919–1921: The Silesian uprisings of the ethnic Poles against Weimar rule.
- 1919: A revolution in Hungary, resulting in the short-lived Hungarian Soviet Republic.
- 1919: Counterrevolution in Hungary against the Hungarian Soviet Republic. After many failed attempts, legitimist and other far-right forces take over Transdunabia after the Soviet Republic falls to the Romanians.

== 1920s ==
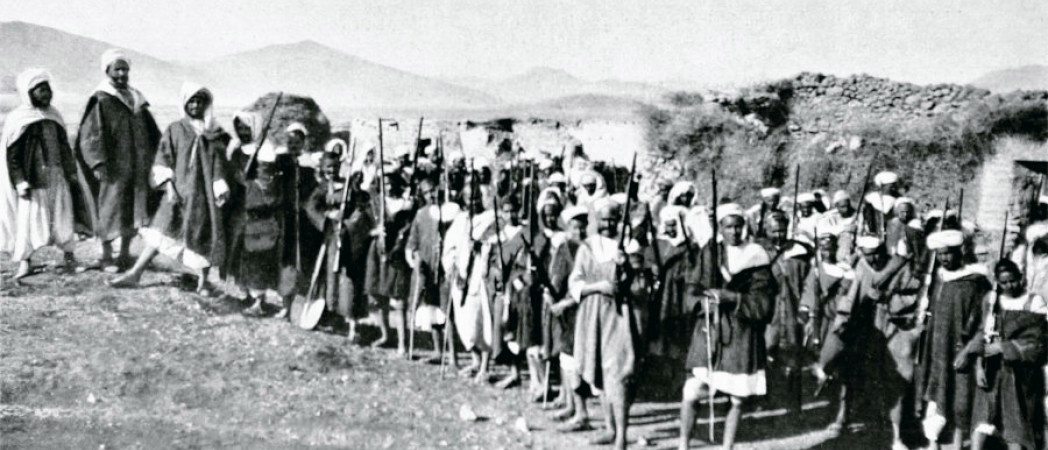
Riffian Berber rebels during the Rif War in Spanish Morocco, 1922

- 1920: The Pitchfork uprising was a peasant uprising against the Soviet policy of the war communism in what is today Tatarstan.
- 1920: Kapp Putsch and the following Ruhr Uprising in Germany
- 1920: Iraqi Revolt
- 1920-1922 Tambov Rebellion
- 1920–1922: Patagonia Rebelde, the uprising and violent suppression of a rural workers' strike in the Argentine province of Santa Cruz in Patagonia between 1920 and 1922.
- 1920–1922: Gandhi led Non-cooperation movement.
- 1920: The Husino uprising in Tuzla, Bosnia and Herzegovina
- 1920: December general strike in Czechoslovakia [cz]
- 1920: Oslavan uprising [cz]
- 1921: The Battle of Blair Mountain ten to fifteen thousand coal miners rebel in West Virginia, assaulting mountain-top lines of trenches established by the coal companies and local sheriff's forces in the largest armed, organized uprising in American labor history.
- 1921: The Kronstadt rebellion of Soviet sailors against the government of the early Russian SFSR.
- 1921: The Poplar Rates Rebellion.
- 1921: Brief communist takeover of Baranya county, declaring the Serbian-Hungarian Baranya-Baja Republic
- 1921: Uprising in West Hungary by far-right paramilitaries resisting the Hungarian handover of Burgenland to Austria
- 1921: Habsburg legitimist rebellion attempting to restore Charles IV to the throne of Hungary.
- 1921: The rebellion of Mirdita led by Markagjoni declares the independence of Republic of Mirdita from Albania.
- 1921–1922: The Karelian Uprising
- 1921–1923: The Yakut Revolt.
- 1921–1924: A revolution in (Outer) Mongolia re-establishes the country's independence and sets out to construct a Soviet-style socialist state.
- 1921: The Moplah rebellion, uprising against the colonial British authority and Hindu landlords in the Malabar in South India by Mappila Muslims, aftermath of a series of peasant uprising in the past centuries.
- 1921: March Action in Germany
- 1922: The March on Rome, organized mass demonstration which resulted in Benito Mussolini's National Fascist Party acceding to power in the Kingdom of Italy.
- 1922: The Bondelswarts Rebellion by Khoikhoi people against the apartheid regime of South West Africa.
- 1922–1923: The Irish Civil War, between supporters of the Anglo-Irish Treaty and the government of the Irish Free State and more radical members of the original Irish Republican Army who opposed the treaty and the new government.
- 1923: Bajram Curri attacks gendarmerie of Kruma, Albania.
- 1923: The founding of the Republic of Turkey by overthrow of the Ottoman Empire and introduction of Atatürk's Reforms.
- 1923: The Klaipėda Revolt in the Memel territory that had been detached from Germany after World War I.
- 1923: Küstrin Putsch in Germany
- 1923: The German October, communist revolutions across Germany, including the Hamburg Uprising and Reichsexekution in Saxony and Thuringia
- 1923: September Uprising in Bulgaria.
- 1923-24: Rebellion in Pfalz, by Franz Joseph Heinz's Pfälzischen Corps
- 1923: The Adwan Rebellion in Jordan.
- 1924–1925: The Khost rebellion in Afghanistan.
- 1924: The August Uprising in Georgia against Soviet rule.
- 1925: The Sheikh Said Rebellion.
- 1925: The July Revolution in Ecuador.
- 1925–1927: The Great Syrian Revolt, a revolt initiated by the Druze and led by Sultan al-Atrash against French Mandate.
- 1926: Angry catholic peasants of Dukagjin, Shkodër fight against army and gendarmerie.
- 1926: The National Revolution in Portugal initiated a period known as the National Dictatorship.
- 1926–1929: The Cristero War in Mexico, an uprising against anti-clerical government policy.
- 1926–1927: The first Communist rebellion in Indonesia against colonialism and imperialism of Dutch colonial government.
- 1927-1937: First half of the Chinese Civil War.
- 1927: Sheikh Abdurrahman rebellion by Kurdish Zazas against Turkey.
- 1927–1930: The Wahhabi Rebellion of Ikhwan against Ibn Saud in Arabia.
- 1927–1931: The Ağrı Rebellion by Kurds against Turkey.
- 1927–1933: A rebellion led by Augusto César Sandino against the United States presence in Nicaragua.
- 1928–1931: A rebellion led by Bhagat Singh against the British Rule in India.
- 1929: The Women's War broke out when thousands of Igbo women traveled to the town of Oloko to protest against the Warrant Chiefs, whom they accused of restricting the role of women in the government.

== 1930s ==
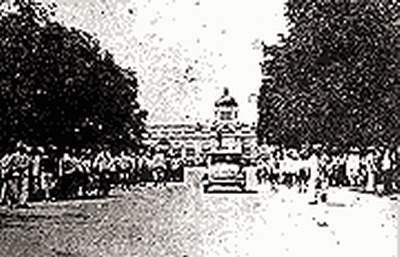
Soldiers assembled in front of the Throne Hall, Siam, 24 June 1932

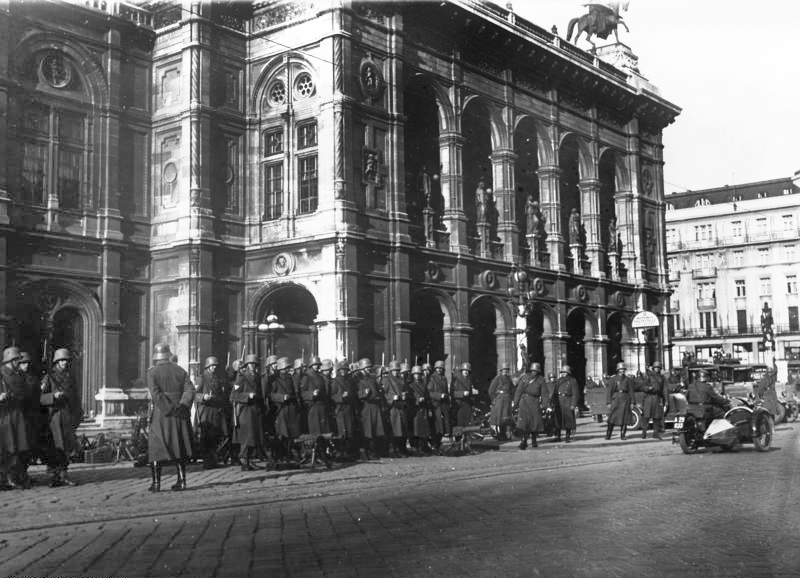
Austrian Civil War: Army soldiers take position in front of the Vienna State Opera

- 1930: The Revolution of 1930 in Brazil, led by Getúlio Vargas.
- 1930–1931: Nghe-Tinh Revolt in Vietnam, led by the Communist Party of Indochina, against French colonialism.
- 1930–1934: The Saya San Rebellion in British Burma, led by Saya San, against British rule in Burma.
- 1930: Yên Bái mutiny of Vietnam, led by Vietnamese Nationalist Party, against French Occupation.
- 1930: The Salt Satyagraha, a campaign of non-violent protest against the salt tax in British India.
- 1930: The Musha Incident led by the Seediq Indigenous group is the last major uprising in Japanese-controlled Taiwan.
- 1931: Taking of Encarnación by anarcho-syndicalists in Paraguay.
- 1932: Alt Llobregat insurrection in Catalonia, Spain.
- 1932: The Constitutionalist Revolution against provisional president Getúlio Vargas led Brazil to a short civil war.
- 1932: The Aprista revolt in Trujillo, Peru.
- 1932: The 1932 Salvadoran peasant uprising, known as La matanza ("The Slaughter"), Pipil and peasant rebellion led by Farabundo Martí
- 1932: The Siamese coup d'état of 1932, sometimes called the "Promoters Revolution", ends absolute monarchy in Thailand.
- 1933: Anarchist insurrection of January 1933 in Spain.
- 1933: The popular revolution against Cuban dictator Gerardo Machado.
- 1933: Dutch sailors on the cruiser HNLMS De Zeven Provinciën mutiny.
- 1933: Boworadet Rebellion in Thailand
- 1933: Anarchist insurrection of December 1933 in Spain.
- 1934: Latvian coup d’état by Latvian prime minister Kārlis Ulmanis against the parliamentary system in Latvia. Lasted until 1940.
- 1934: The Austrian Civil War between paramilitary forces of socialist Schutzbund and fascist Heimwehr
- 1934: The Spanish Revolutionary General Strike of October took place during the black biennium of the Second Spanish Republic.
- 1935: Muharrem Bajraktari, former Aide-de-camp of King Zog, led a revolt against government in North Albania.
- 1935: A secret anti-Zogist organization led an uprising against the Albanian government and King Zog in Fier and Lushnje.
- 1935: The Communist Uprising in Rio Grande do Norte, Pernambuco and Rio de Janeiro; Brazil.
- 1935–1936: Iraqi Shia revolts against Hashemite central rule.
- 1935: Imam Reza shrine rebellion in Iran of Shi'ite radicals against Reza Shah.
- 1935–1936: Second Italo-Ethiopian War in which Ethiopians resisted Italian occupation.
- 1936: The Febrerista Revolution, led by Rafael Franco, ended oligarchic Liberal Party rule in Paraguay.
- 1936: The Spanish Revolution, a workers' social revolution that began during the outbreak of the Spanish Civil War.
- 1936: The Portuguese Naval revolt against the Estado Novo regime.
- 1936–1939: Arab revolt in Palestine against the British Mandate.
- 1936–1939: Spanish Civil War.
- 1936–1939: David Toro seizes power in Bolivia, initiating a period of so-called "military socialism", including nationalization of Standard Oil and passage of progressive labor laws, and establishing a corporative state in 1938.
- 1937–1938: The Dersim Rebellion, the most important Kurdish rebellion in modern Turkey.
- 1937: The Fets de Maig or "May Days", a major strike in Catalonia, Spain.
- 1937: The Revolt of Delvina, a revolt of gendarmerie and local peasants against King Zog.
- 1938: Sudeten German uprising orchestrated by Sudeten German Party against Czechoslovakia.
- 1938: The Integralist Uprising in Rio de Janeiro, Brazil.
- 1939–1965: Spanish Maquis insurgency
- 1939–1940: The Irish Republican Army attempt a sabotage campaign against British rule in Northern Ireland
- 1939–1945: Resistance during World War II
- 1939-1945: Polish resistance

== 1940s ==
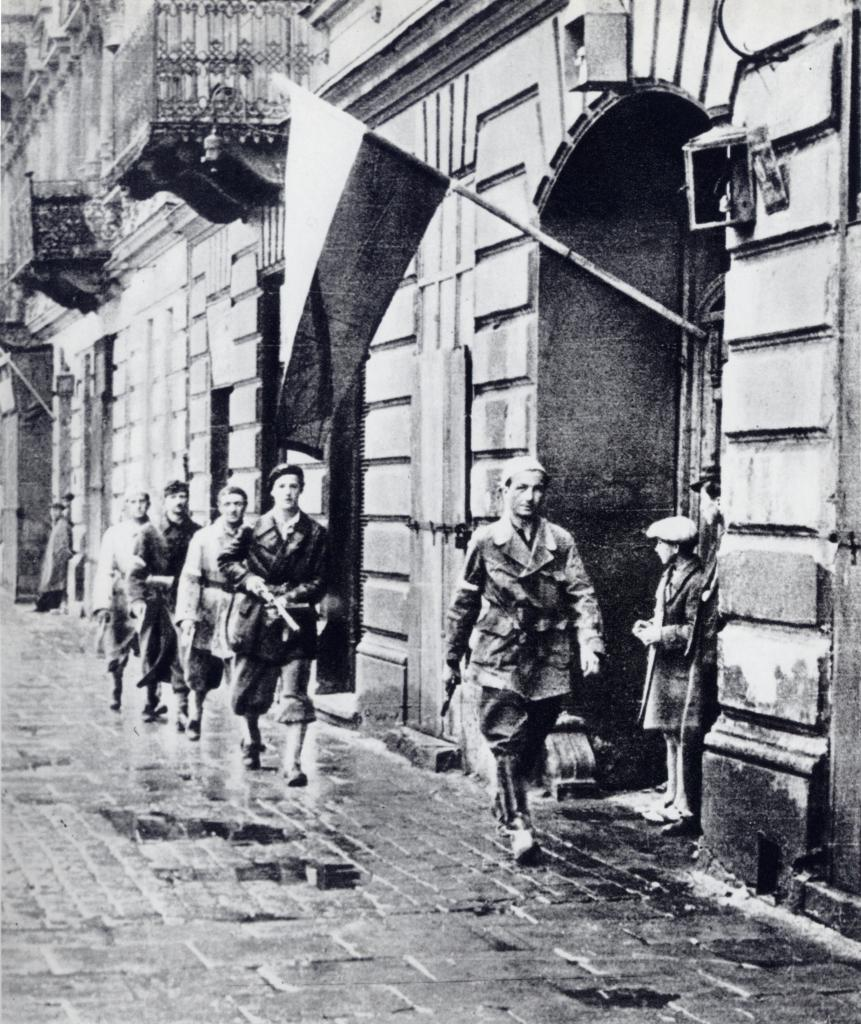
Patrol of Lieut. Stanisław Jankowski ("Agaton") from Battalion Pięść, 1 August 1944: "W-hour" (17:00)

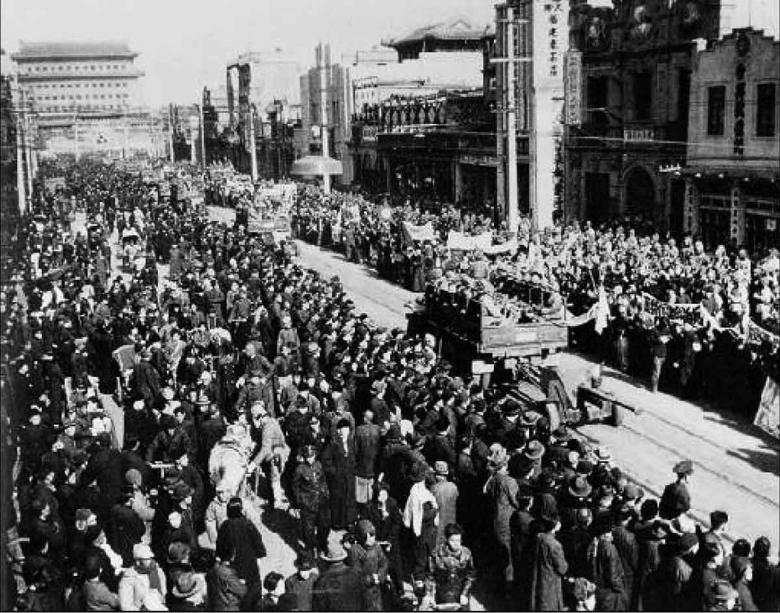
The PLA enters Beijing in the Pingjin Campaign and control the later capital of PRC

- 1940–1948: The Insurgency in Chechnya.
- 1940: Cochinchina Uprising of Vietnam, led by Viet Minh, against French and Japanese Occupation
- 1940-1944: French Resistance
- 1940: Bac Son Uprising of Vietnam, led by Viet Minh, against French and Japanese Occupation
- 1940–1947: Mohammad Ali Jinnah's struggle for a separate state for the Muslims of India.
- 1941: The June Uprising against the Soviet Union in Lithuania.
- 1941: Legionnaires' rebellion and Bucharest pogrom, Romania
- 1941–1945: Yugoslav People's Liberation War against the Axis powers in World War II.
- 1941–1944: Greek Resistance
- 1941: Do Luong Mutiny of Vietnam, led by Doi Cung, against French occupation
- 1942: Sri Lankan soldiers ignite the Cocos Islands Mutiny in an unsuccessful attempt to transfer the islands to Japanese control.
- 1942: The destruction of the German garrison in Lenin.
- 1942–1944: The Irish Republican Army tries to start a new campaign in Northern Ireland called the Northern Campaign and fails
- 1943: The Warsaw Ghetto Uprising.
- 1943: The uprising at Treblinka extermination camp.
- 1943: Following the liberation of Albania, the Communist Party of Albania under Enver Hoxha consolidated its control and declared the People's Republic of Albania in January 1946.
- 1943: The uprising at Sobibór extermination camp.
- 1943: The Woyane Rebellion in northern Ethiopia threatens to topple the newly restored government, and is put down with British help.
- 1943–1945: Italian Resistance Movement against Nazi occupation and the Fascist Italian Social Republic, culminating in 25 April final insurrection in Northern Italy.
- 1944: The Guatemalan Revolution overthrows the dictator Federico Ponce Vaides by liberal military officers.
- 1944: The Warsaw Uprising was an armed struggle during the Second World War by the Polish Home Army (Armia Krajowa) to liberate Warsaw from German occupation and Nazi rule. It started on 1 August 1944.
- 1944: The Paris Uprising staged by the French Resistance against the German Paris garrison.
- 1944: The Slovak National uprising against Nazi Germany.
- 1944: The uprising at Auschwitz extermination camp.
- 1944–1947: The Jewish insurgency in Palestine.
- 1944–1947: A Communist-friendly government was installed in Bulgaria following a coup d'état and the Soviet invasion.
- 1944–1949: The Greek Civil War.
- 1944-1953: Anti-communist resistance in Poland.
- 1944–1965: The Forest Brothers Rebellion in Baltic states against Soviet Union.
- 1945: The first anti-communist revolt in Eastern Europe in Koplik, Albania led by bayraktars and intellectuals.
- 1945–1949: The Indonesian National Revolution against Dutch after their independence from Japan. Led by Sukarno, Hatta, Tan Malaka, etc. with the Dutch led by Van Mook.
- 1945: May uprising of Czech people cz
  - The Prague uprising against German occupation during World War II.
- 1945: Ba To Uprising of Vietnam, led by Viet Minh, against French and Japanese Occupation
- 1945: The August Revolution led by Ho Chi Minh and Viet Minh declared the independence of the Democratic Republic of Vietnam from French rule.
- 1945: A democratic revolution in Venezuela, led by Rómulo Betancourt.
- 1945-1949: Second half of the Chinese Civil War.
- 1946: The Royal Indian Navy Mutiny takes place in Bombay, and spreads to different parts of British India, demanding Indian independence.
- 1946 — 1951: Telangana Rebellion a Communist-led Peasant rebellion in Telangana and Hyderabad, India, ("Telangana Peasants Armed Struggle") was a Peasant rebellion against the feudal lords of the Telangana region in the princely state of Hyderabad, and later the Indian government.
- 1946: Another attempt of anti-communist forces in Albania to take out the government takes place in Shkodër.
- 1946: The Battle of Athens, Tennessee (aka the McMinn County War); a local revolt against officials accused of rigging local elections.
- 1947: Three months after an abortive coup, civil war broke out in Paraguay. The rebellion was crushed by the government of dictator Higinio Morínigo.
- 1947 : Sardar Muhammad Ibrahim Khan waged and led a guerrilla war against the Maharaja Hari Singh of Kashmir and formed a revolutionary Government on 24 October under his Presidency. He captured a large area of Kashmir called Azad Kashmir.
- 1947–1952: In the Albanian Subversion, the intelligence services of the United States and Britain deployed exiled fascists, Nazis, and monarchists in a failed attempt to foment a counterrevolution in Communist-ruled Albania.
- 1947: Angami Zapu Phizo declared the independence of Nagaland from India only to be subdued by the Indian army.
- 1947: The 228 Massacre occurred following discontent and resentment of the native Taiwanese under the early rule of the KMT of the island.
- 1947: India wins independence from Britain.
- 1947-1949: The Malagasy Uprising.
- 1948: The Costa Rican Civil War precipitated by the vote of the Costa Rican Legislature, dominated by pro-government representatives, to annul the results of the presidential election of 1948.
- 1948: Following the liberation of Korea, Marxist former guerrillas under Kim Il Sung work to rapidly industrialize the country and rid it of the last vestiges of "feudalism.".
- 1948–1960: The Malayan Emergency.
- 1948-1989: The communist insurgency in Burma is launched.
- 1948: Al-Wathbah (the Leap) uprising in Iraq.
- 1948 : Second Communist rebellion in Indonesia. The Communists tried to establish the Indonesian Soviet Republic, but were crushed by the Indonesian National Armed Forces.
- 1949: Chinese Communist Revolution. A period of social and political revolution in China that culminated in the establishment of the People's Republic of China in 1949.
- 1949-1962: Darul Islam rebellion. Darul Islam attempted to overthrow the government and establish an Islamic state in Indonesia.

== 1950s ==
External audio
- Newsreel scenes in Spanish of the Puerto Rican Nationalist Party Revolts of the 1950s here

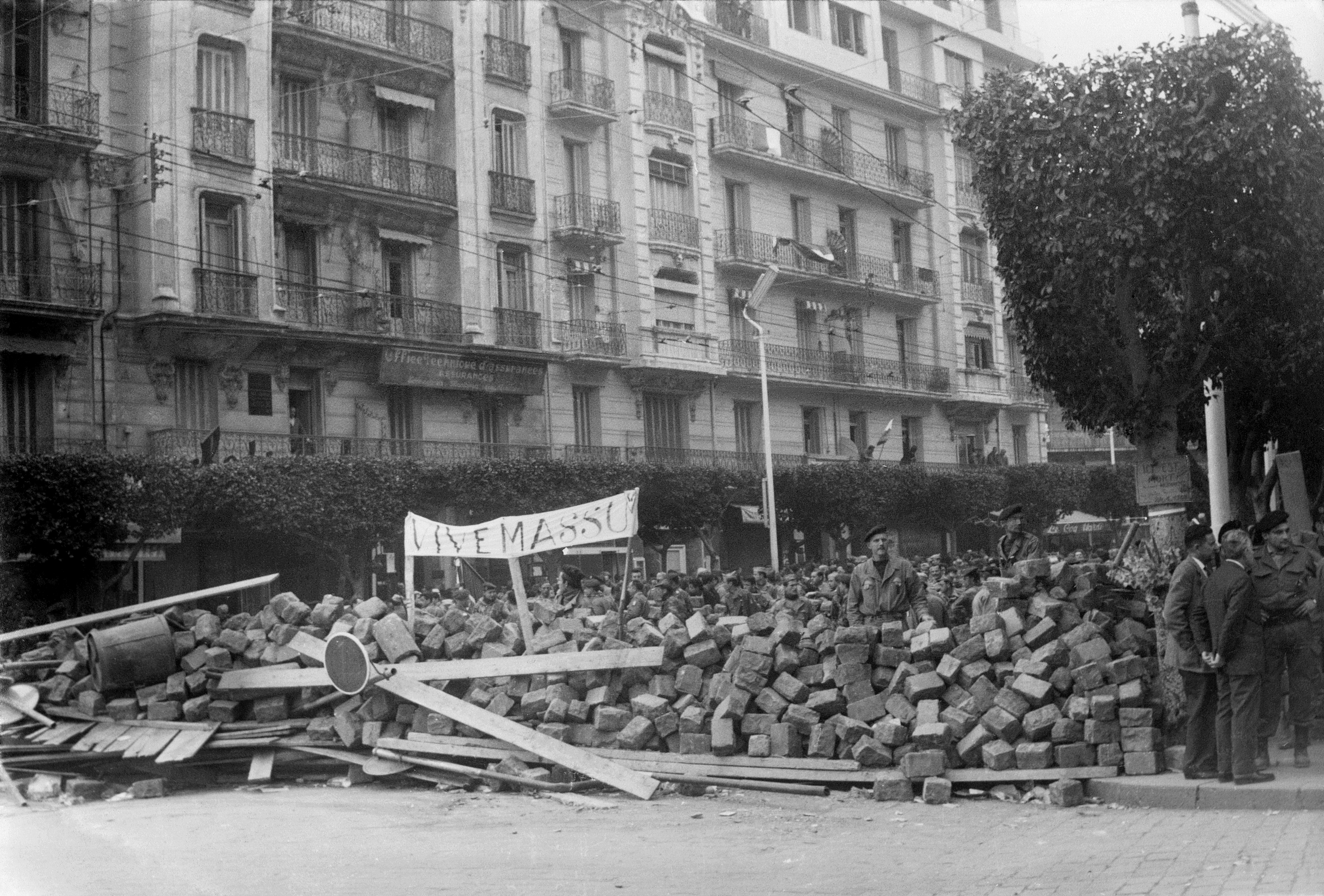
Barricades in Algiers. "Long live Massu" (Vive Massu) is written on the banner. (January 1960)

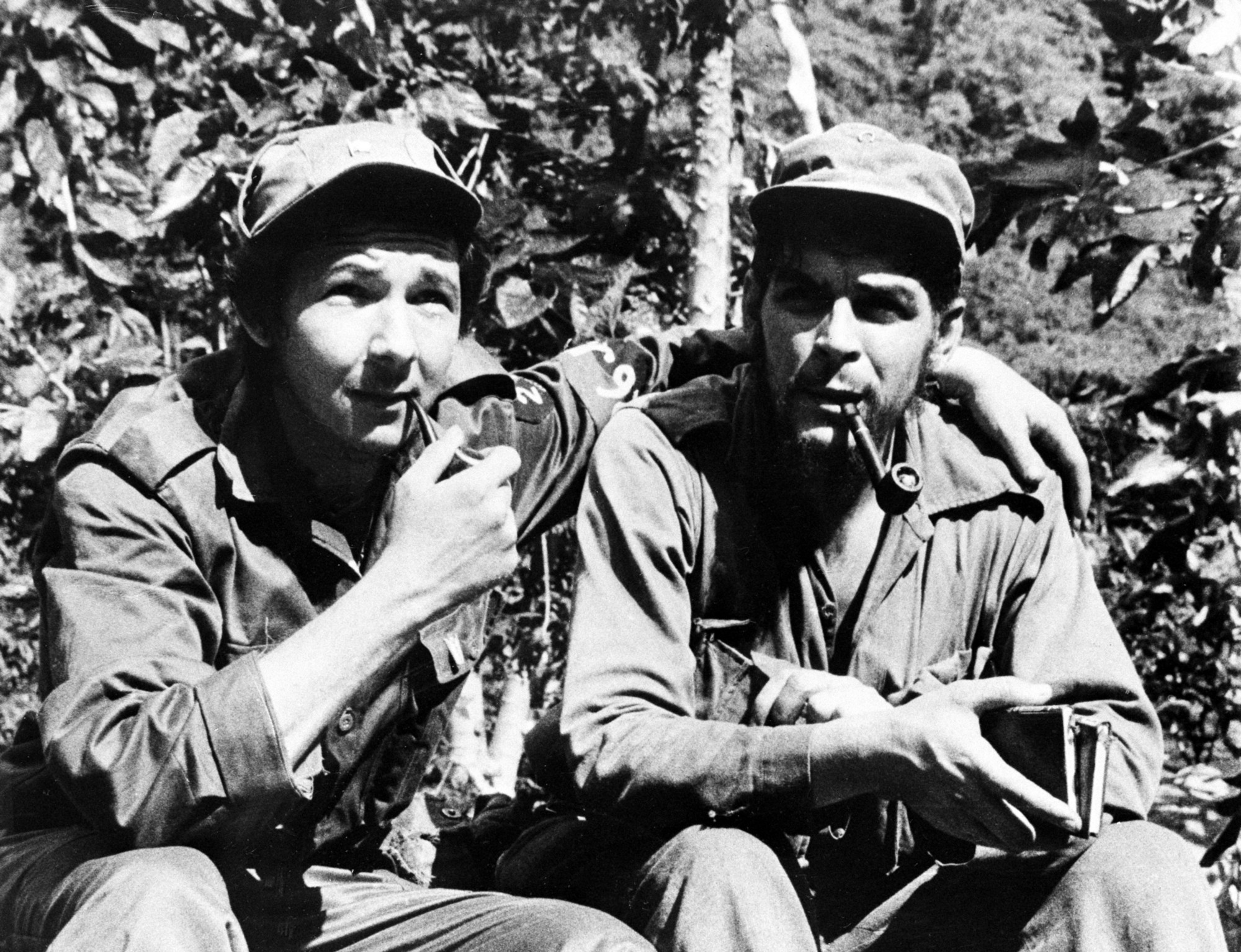
Raúl Castro (left), with his arm around second-in-command Ernesto "Che" Guevara, in their Sierra de Cristal Mountain stronghold in Oriente Province Cuba, 1958.

- 1950: The Cazin uprising in the town of Cazin, Bosnia and Herzegovina
- 1950: The Puerto Rican Nationalist Party Revolts of the 1950s in Puerto Rico, attempt on the life of US president Harry S. Truman in the Blair House, and shooting at Congress, was a call for Puerto Rico's independence and uprising by the Puerto Rican Nationalist Party against United States Government rule of Puerto Rico.
- 1950s: The Mau Mau uprising.
- 1950: Republic of South Maluku (RMS) separatist rebellion. The rebellion was crushed by Indonesian National Armed Forces. Surviving RMS rebels founded government-in-exile in The Netherlands.
- 1951: A Revolution in Nepal introduced democracy in Nepal.
- 1951-1952: 426 Battalion rebellion. An Indonesian army battalion rebelled against the government with the support of Darul Islam. The rebellion was crushed in 1952, and the remaining rebels joined Darul Islam and an armed group in the Merapi Merbabu Complex.
- 1952: A popular revolution in Bolivia led by Víctor Paz Estenssoro and the Revolutionary Nationalist Movement (MNR) initiates a period of multiparty democracy lasting until a 1964 military coup.
- 1952: The Rosewater Revolution in Lebanon.
- 1952: Egyptian Revolution of 1952
- 1953: The Vorkuta uprising was a major uprising of the Gulag inmates in Vorkuta in the summer of 1953. Like other camp uprisings it was bloodily quelled by the Red Army and the NKVD.
- 1953: Uprising of 1953 in East Germany.
- 1953: The 1953 Iranian coup d'état overthrows Prime Minister Mohammad Mosaddegh amid the Abadan Crisis over Mosaddegh's nationalization of the oil industry.
- 1953–1959: The Cuban Revolution led by Fidel Castro removes the government of General Fulgencio Batista. By 1962 Cuba had been transformed into a declared socialist republic.
- 1953–1975: The Laotian Civil War in Laos.
- 1954–1962: The Algerian War of Independence: an uprising against French colonialism.
- 1954–1968: The Civil rights movement in the United States was a struggle by African Americans to end legalized racial discrimination, disenfranchisement and racial segregation.
- 1954: The Kengir uprising in the Soviet prison labor camp Kengir.
- 1954: The Uyghur uprising against Chinese rule in Hotan.
- 1955–1960: The Guerrilla war against British colonial rule of Cyprus led by the EOKA (National Organisation of Cypriot Fighters).
- 1955–1972: The First Sudanese Civil War was a conflict between the northern part of Sudan and a south that demanded more regional autonomy.
- 1955–1958: The Revolución Libertadora in Argentina.
- 1956–1962: The Border Campaign led by the Irish Republican Army against the British, along the border of the independent Republic of Ireland and British Northern Ireland.
- 1956: De-Stalinization revolution in the Eastern Bloc:
  - The Khrushchev Thaw
  - The 1956 Georgian demonstrations
  - The Poznań protests, a workers' uprising in the Polish People's Republic that was suppressed.
  - The Polish October
  - The Hungarian Revolution, a failed workers' and peasants' revolution against the Soviet-supported communist state in Hungary.
  - The Bucharest student movement
- 1956: The Tibetan rebellions against Chinese rule broke out in Amdo and Kham.
- 1956: Quỳnh Lưu uprising against communist government in North Vietnam
- 1958: A popular revolt in Venezuela against military dictator Marcos Pérez Jiménez culminates in a civic-military coup d'état.
- 1958: The Iraqi Revolution (14 July Revolution) led by nationalist soldiers abolishes the British-backed monarchy, executes many of its top officials, and begins to assert the country's independence from both Cold War power blocs.
- 1959: The failed Tibetan uprising against Chinese rule led to the flight of the Dalai Lama.
- 1959–1962: In the Rwandan Revolution, the Tutsi king of Rwanda is forced into exile by Hutu extremists; racial pogroms follow an assassination attempt on Hutu leader Grégoire Kayibanda.

== 1960s ==
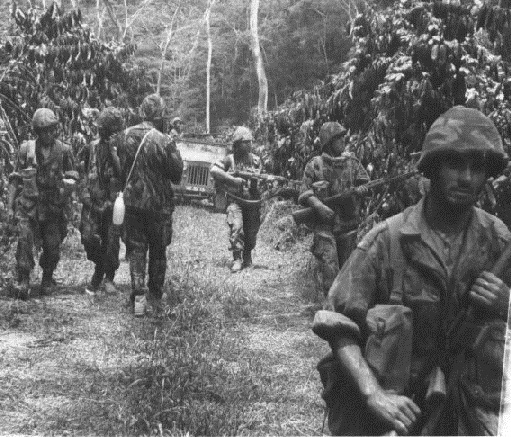
Portuguese soldiers in Angola

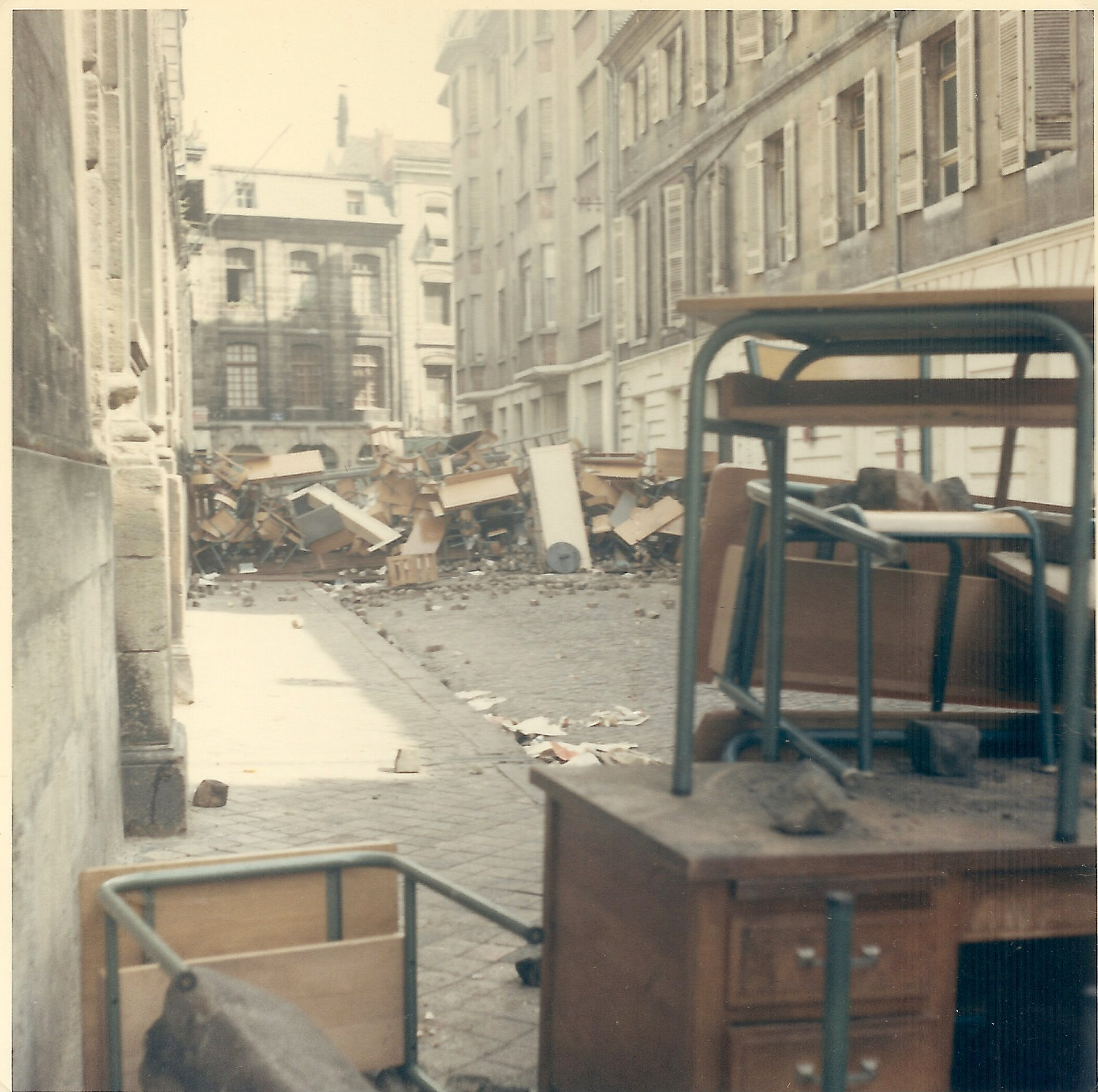
Barricades in Bordeaux during the May 68 revolt in France.

- 1960: A group of disaffected Ethiopian officers make an unsuccessful attempt to depose Emperor Haile Selassie and replace him with a more progressive government, but are defeated by the rest of the Ethiopian military.
- 1960: April Revolution erupts in South Korea, leading to the end of the First Republic of South Korea.
- 1961: The Legality Campaign (Campanha da Legalidade) in Brazil.
- 1961: El Barcelonazo in Venezuela.
- 1961–1970: First Kurdish Iraqi War erupts as a result of Barzanji clan uprising.
- 1961–1991: The Eritrean War of Independence led by Isaias Afewerki against Ethiopia.
- 1961–1975: The Angolan War of Independence began as an uprising against forced cotton harvesting, and became a multi-faction struggle for control of Portugal's Overseas Province of Angola.
- 1962: El Carupanazo in Venezuela.
- 1962: El Porteñazo in Venezuela.
- 1962–1974: The leftist African Party for the Independence of Guinea and Cape Verde (PAIGC) wages a revolutionary war of independence in Portuguese Guinea. In 1973, the independent Republic of Guinea-Bissau is proclaimed, and the next year the republic's independence is recognized by the reformist military junta in Lisbon.
- 1962: The military coup of 1962 in Burma, led by General Ne Win, who became the country's strongman.
- 1962–present: Papua conflict.
- 1962: A revolution in northern Yemen overthrew the imam and established the Yemen Arab Republic.
- 1962–1975: Dhofar Rebellion in Oman.
- 1963: White Revolution in Iran.
- 1963: 1963 demonstrations in Iran.
- 1963 Dutch farmers' revolt.
- 1963: Syrian coup d'état in Syria that brought Ba'ath Party to power.
- 1963–1970: The Bale Revolt in southern Ethiopia, was a guerrilla war by local Somali and Oromo against Amhara settlers.
- 1963–1971: Ogaden Revolt in southern Ethiopia, a guerrilla war by Somalis seeking self-determination.
- 1964: Simba Rebellion in the Congo.
- 1964: The Zanzibar Revolution overthrew the 157-year-old Arab monarchy, declared the People's Republic of Zanzibar, and began the process of unification with Julius Nyerere's Tanganyika.
- 1964: 1964 Brazilian coup d'état led by Field Marshal Humberto Castelo Branco against president Joao Goulart.
- 1964–1979: The Rhodesian Bush War, also known as the Second Chimurenga, was a guerrilla war which lasted from July 1964 to 1979 and led to universal suffrage, the end of white minority rule in Rhodesia, and the creation of the Republic of Zimbabwe.
- 1964: The October Revolution in Sudan, driven by a general strike and rioting, forced President Ibrahim Abboud to transfer executive power to a transitional civilian government, and eventually to resign.
- 1964–1975: The Mozambican Liberation Front (FRELIMO), formed in 1962, commenced a guerrilla war against Portuguese colonialism. Independence was granted on 25 June 1975; however, the Mozambican Civil War complicated the political situation and frustrated FRELIMO's attempts at radical change. The war continued into the early 1990s after the government dropped Marxism as the state ideology.
- 1964–present: The Colombian Armed Conflict.
- 1965: Following the overthrow of Dominican President Juan Bosch in 1963, tensions erupted between loyalists of the government and rebels, sparking the April Revolution. The fear of communist rule in the Dominican Republic, similar to the case of Cuba after the Cuban Revolution, triggered a second U.S invasion into the country.
- 1965: 30 September Movement was a failed coup by the Communist Party to turn Indonesia into a Communist state.
- 1965: The March Intifada in Bahrain: a Leftist uprising demanding an end to the British presence in Bahrain.
- 1965-1983: The communist insurgency in Thailand is launched.
- 1966: Kwame Nkrumah is removed from power in Ghana by coup d'état.
- 1966–1990: A South African Police patrol clashes with militants of the South West African People's Organization in 1966, sparking the Namibian War of Independence. The conflict is part of the larger South African Border War and linked closely with South Africa's intervention in the Angolan Civil War. It largely ended with Namibia's first democratic elections in 1989.
- 1966–1993: A guerrilla warfare was conducted against the government of François Tombalbaye from the Sudan-based group FROLINAT.
- 1966–1976: Mao Zedong launches the Great Proletarian Cultural Revolution in the People's Republic of China, a sociopolitical movement to purge revisionist and bourgeois elements from the Chinese Communist Party and Chinese society at large through violent class struggle.
- 1966–1998: The Ulster Volunteer Force was recreated by militant Ulster Protestant loyalists in Northern Ireland to wage war against the Irish Republican Army and the Roman Catholic community at large in the Troubles.
- 1966: The year it is estimated the Black Power movement began, with no exact official end date.
- 1967–1970: Biafra: The former eastern Nigeria unsuccessfully fought for a breakaway republic of Biafra, after the mainly Igbo people of the region suffered pogroms in northern Nigeria the previous year.
- 1967: The Naxalite Movement begins in India, led by the AICCCR.
- 1967: Anguillans resentful of Kittitian domination of the island expelled the Kittitian police and declared independence from the British colony of Saint Christopher-Nevis-Anguilla. British forces retook the island in 1969 and made Anguilla a separate dependency in 1980. There was no bloodshed in the entire episode.
- 1967–1973: The Opposition to United States involvement in the Vietnam War begins to turn violent, the violence later escalates. Incidents include the Weather High School Jailbreaks and the Greenwich Village townhouse explosion
- 1967: Pro-communist, anti-British riots in Hong Kong
- 1967: Long, hot summer of 1967 – a series of 159 race riots which occurred in major cities across the United States in the summer of 1967
  - 1967 Buffalo riot (June 26 – July 1)
  - 1967 Cairo riot (July 17)
  - 1967 Cambridge riot (July 24, 1967)
  - 1967 Detroit riot (July 23–28)
  - 1967 Toledo riot (July 23–25)
  - 1967 Milwaukee riot (July 30 – August 31)
  - 1967 Newark riots (July 12–17)
  - 1967 Plainfield riots (July 14–16)
  - 1967 Saginaw riot (July 26)
  - 1967 Albina riot (July 30)
- 1968–present: Moro conflict in the Philippines.
- 1968: The revolution in the Republic of Congo.
- 1968: The Protests of 1968:
  - The May 1968 revolt: students' and workers' revolt against the government of Charles de Gaulle in France.
  - A failed attempt by leader Alexander Dubček to liberalise Czechoslovakia in defiance of the Soviet-supported communist state culminates in the Prague Spring.
  - The March of the One Hundred Thousand was a manifestation of popular protest against the military dictatorship in Brazil, which occurred in Rio de Janeiro.
  - The 1968 movement in Italy
    - Battle of Valle Giulia
  - The 1968 student demonstrations in Yugoslavia
  - The West German student movement
  - A mass movement of workers, students, and peasants in Pakistan forced the resignation of President Mohammad Ayub Khan.
  - The 1968 Polish political crisis
  - The Mexican Movement of 1968
    - Tlatelolco massacre
  - King-assassination riots – a series of race riots following the assassination of Martin Luther King Jr.
    - 1968 Detroit riots
    - 1968 New York City riot
    - 1968 Washington D.C. riot
    - 1968 Chicago riot
    - 1968 Pittsburgh riots
    - 1968 Baltimore riots
    - 1968 Kansas City riot
    - 1968 Wilmington riot
    - 1968 Louisville riot
  - 1968 Democratic National Convention protests
  - Columbia University protests of 1968
- 1968: A coup by Juan Velasco Alvarado in Peru, followed by radical social and economic reforms.
- 1968–1969 Iraqi communists launched an insurgency in southern Iraq.
- 1968–1969: The Egbe Agbekoya Revolt was an unsuccessful peasant revolt in Western Nigeria.
- 1969–present: Communist rebellion in the Philippines.
- 1969–1998: The Troubles: the Provisional Irish Republican Army and other Republican Paramilitaries waged an armed campaign against British Security forces and Loyalist Paramilitaries in an attempt to bring about a United Ireland.
- 1969: The Days of Rage occur, part of the Opposition to United States involvement in the Vietnam War.

== 1970s ==
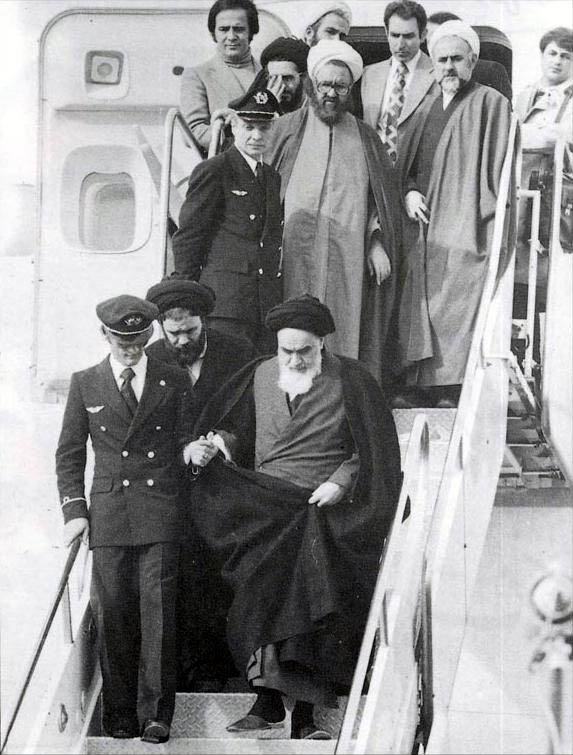
Ruhollah Khomeini returns to Iran after 14 years of exile on 1 February 1979

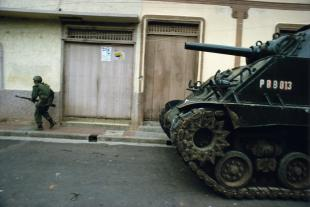
Nicaraguan National Guard clashes with Sandinista rebels in 1979, during the Nicaraguan Revolution.

- 1970: Borghese Coup fails in Italy.
- 1970: The Black Power Revolution occurs in Trinidad.
- 1970: A rebellion in Guinea by what its government identified as Portuguese agents.
- 1970–1971: Black September in Jordan
- 1971: The Bangladesh Liberation War led by the Mukti Bahini establishes the independent People's Republic of Bangladesh from the former East Pakistan.
- 1971 Dutch farmers' revolt
- 1972–present: The Maoist insurgency in Turkey is launched.
- 1972: A revolution in Benin.
- 1972: A military-led revolution against the civilian government of President Philibert Tsiranana in the Malagasy Republic; a Marxist faction takes power in 1975 under Didier Ratsiraka, modeled on the North Korean juche theory developed by Kim Il Sung.
- 1973: 1973 Chilean coup d'etat led by Captain General Augusto Pinochet against President Salvador Allende in Chile.
- 1973: Wounded Knee Incident. American Indian Movement activists and Oglala Lakota besiege the small town of Wounded Knee in protest of government policies towards Native Americans and the corrupt Wilson Regime. Part of the Red Power movement
- 1973: Mohammad Daud Khan overthrows the monarchy and establishes a republic in Afghanistan.
- 1973: Worker-student demonstrations in Thailand force dictator Thanom Kittikachorn and two close associates to flee the country, beginning a short period of democratic constitutional rule.
- 1974: The Ethiopian Revolution results in the overthrow of Emperor Haile Selassie, the establishment of the communist Derg junta and the beginning of the Ethiopian Civil War.
- 1974–1975: The Carnation Revolution overthrows the right-wing dictatorship in Portugal. Leads to the independence of Angola, Cape Verde, Mozambique, São Tomé and Príncipe and Timor-Leste and recognition of Guinea-Bissau's self-proclaimed independence.
- 1975–1991: The Western Sahara War was a conflict between the Sahrawi national liberation movement named POLISARIO against the armies of their neighbours, Morocco and Mauritania, who have entered the territory when the Spanish colonizers troops fled.
- 1975: A revolution in Cambodia.
- 1975: Lebanese Civil War lasted from 1975 to 1990.
- 1975: 15 August, coup led by young military officers and the Assassination of Sheikh Mujibur Rahman in Bangladesh.
- 1975: Coup led by Brigadier Khaled Mosharraf and Colonel Shafaat Jamil in Bangladesh to depose President Khondaker Mostaq Ahmad. Three days later a counter-coup by Colonel Abu Taher puts Ziaur Rahman in power.
- 1975: Having become disillusioned with the rule of Leonid Brezhnev, Valery Sablin leads a mutiny in hopes of starting a Leninist revolution in the Soviet Union.
- 1976-1988: The "May-Revolution" by the Kurds in North-Iraq against the government.
- 1976: Student demonstrations and election-related violence in Thailand lead police to open fire on a sit-in at Thammasat University, killing hundreds. The military seizes power the next day, ending constitutional rule.
- 1976: The Gang of Four is removed from power in China in a coup led by Chairman Hua Guofeng with the support of senior officers of the People's Liberation Army, ending the Cultural Revolution.
- 1976: 1976 Argentine coup d'etat led by Lieutenant General Jorge Rafael Videla against President Isabel Perón.
- 1977: Egyptian Bread Riots the riots were a spontaneous uprising by hundreds of thousands of lower-class people, at least 79 people were killed and 800 wounded.
- 1977: The Market Women's Revolt in Guinea leads to a lessening of the state's role in the economy.
- 1977: A mutiny in Bangladesh Air Force occurs, with the goal of establishing a Marxist government, resulting in the deaths of 11 air force officers. Subsequently, 1143 airmen and soldiers were executed for their alleged involvement in the uprising.
- 1978: The Saur Revolution led by the Khalq faction of the People's Democratic Party of Afghanistan deposes and kills President Mohammad Daud Khan.
- 1979: New Jewel Movement led by Maurice Bishop launch an armed revolution and overthrow the government of Eric Gairy in Grenada.
- 1979: The popular overthrow of the Somoza dictatorship in the Nicaraguan Revolution.
- 1979: Anti-Communist Rebels in Nicaragua (aka) Contras start to form.
- 1979: The Iranian Revolution overthrows Shah Mohammad Reza Pahlavi, resulting in the formation of the Islamic Republic of Iran.
- 1979: Cambodia is liberated from the Khmer Rouge regime by the Vietnam-backed Kampuchean People's Revolutionary Party.
- 1979: 1979 Equatorial Guinea coup d'état led by Teodoro Obiang Nguema Mbasogo against Francisco Macías Nguema.
- 1979–1992: Salvadoran Civil War

== 1980s ==
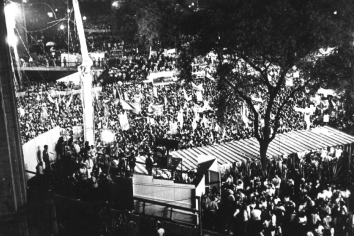
Diretas Já demonstration in São Paulo, Brazil, 1984, demanding direct presidential election and an end to the military dictatorship.

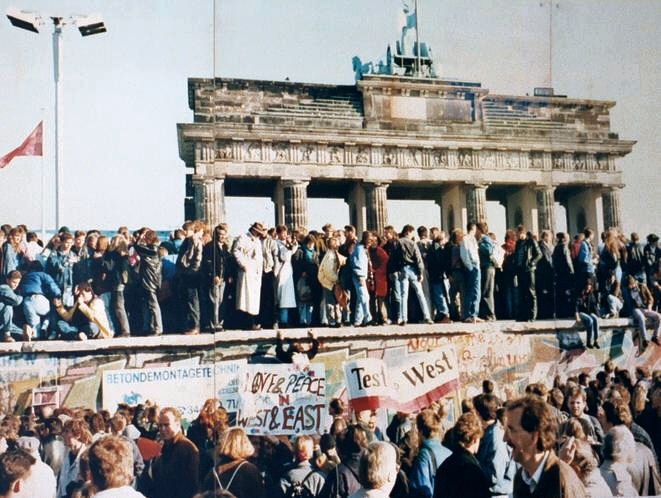
Fall of the Berlin Wall in November 1989, during the Revolutions of 1989.

- 1980: National Socialist Council of Nagaland launches its struggle against Indian administration and the establishment of the greater Nagaland.
- 1980: 1980 Surinamese coup d'état Suriname Government are put aside by a group of soldiers. The leader of the revolution is Desi Delano Bouterse.
- 1980: Gwangju uprising, alternatively called the "May 18 Democratic Uprising", in South Korea
- 1980: The Santo Rebellion in the Anglo-French condominium of New Hebrides
- 1980–2000: The Communist Party of Peru launched the internal conflict in Peru.
- 1980: First Entumbane uprising in Zimbabwe.
- 1981: Assassination of Ziaur Rahman in Bangladesh sparks protests and riots.
- 1981: Second Entumbane uprising in Zimbabwe.
- 1982: General Hussain Muhammad Ershad seizes power through a bloodless coup, deposing president Abdus Sattar in Bangladesh.
- 1983–1984: Diretas Já, a Brazilian civil unrest movement that demanded direct presidential elections.
- 1983: Overthrow of the ruling Conseil de Salut du peuple (CSP) by Marxist forces led by Thomas Sankara in Upper Volta, renamed Burkina Faso in the following year.
- 1983: Prime Minister of Grenada, Maurice Bishop, overthrown and subsequently executed by high-ranking government officials.
- 1983–2009: Starting from 23 July 1983, an on-and-off civil war against the Government of Sri Lanka by the secessionist Liberation Tigers of Tamil Eelam begins. The LTTE fight to establish an independent Tamil state in the Tamil-majority northeastern half of Sri Lanka. Fighting would last for nearly 26 years, resulting in the brutal defeat of the LTTE.
- 1983–2005: The Second Sudanese Civil War was largely a continuation of the First Sudanese Civil War, and one of the longest lasting and deadliest wars of the later 20th century.
- 1984–1999: Kurdish uprising for independence from the Republic of Turkey
- 1984–1985: Pro-independence Kanak and Socialist National Liberation Front (FLNKS) forces in New Caledonia revolt following an election boycott and occupy the town of Thio from November 1984 to January 1985. Thio is retaken by the French after the assassination of Éloi Machoro, the security minister in the FLNKS provisional government and the primary leader of the occupation.
- 1985: Soviet and Afghanistan POWs rose against their captors at Badaber base.
- 1986: The People Power Revolution peacefully overthrows Ferdinand Marcos after his two-decade rule in the Philippines.
- 1986–1991: Somali Rebellion as a result of military dictator Siad Barre beginning to attack clan-based dissident groups.
- 1986: Khalistan Commando Force started armed movement for the establishment of Khalistan, an independent Sikh homeland. The movement, as is the case with other Sikh nationalistic movements, was fueled in part by the Indian army's Operation Blue Star. The armed struggle resulted in thousands of mostly civilian deaths.
- 1987 : The June Struggle overthrew military dictatorship of South Korea.
- The rigged 1987 Jammu and Kashmir Legislative Assembly election created a catalyst for the insurgency when it resulted in some of the state's legislative assembly members forming armed insurgent groups launches its struggle against Indian administration.
- 1987–1991: The First Intifada, or the Palestinian uprising, a series of violent incidents between Palestinians and Israelis.
- 1988–1991: The Pan-Armenian National Movement frees Armenia from Soviet rule.
- 1988–1991: The Singing Revolution, bloodless overthrow of communist rule in Soviet-occupied Estonia, Latvia and Lithuania.
- 1988: The 8888 Uprising In Burma or Myanmar.
- 1989: Armed resistance breaks out in the Kashmir valley against Indian administration.
- 1989–1990 Dutch farmers' protests against wheat price reductions and environmental legislation.
- 1989–1997: The First Liberian Civil War in Liberia
- 1989: Revolutions of 1989 – a series of revolutions against Communist states around the world, especially in the Soviet satellite states of the Eastern Bloc
  - Strikes by the Solidarity movement end in negotiations leading to the end of martial law and the peaceful overthrow of the Communist government in Poland
  - Demonstrations in Hungary led to the peaceful overthrow of the Communist government and the dismantlement of the Hungarian border fence with Austria
  - The Tiananmen Square protests, a series of street demonstrations led by students, intellectuals and labour activists in the People's Republic of China between 15 April and 4 June 1989, ends in a violent crackdown by the People's Liberation Army.
  - Demonstrations in East Germany led to the fall of the Berlin Wall.
  - Demonstrations in the People's Republic of Bulgaria led to the fall of the communist government there.
  - The bloodless Velvet Revolution removes the communist government in Czechoslovakia.
  - The Romanian Revolution kills the dictator Nicolae Ceauşescu and his wife, Elena Ceauşescu, in the Socialist Republic of Romania
  - Baltic Way demonstrations against the Soviet occupation of the Baltic States in Latvia, Lithuania, and Estonia; part of the Singing Revolution against Soviet rule leading to the independence of the Baltic States in 1991

== 1990s ==
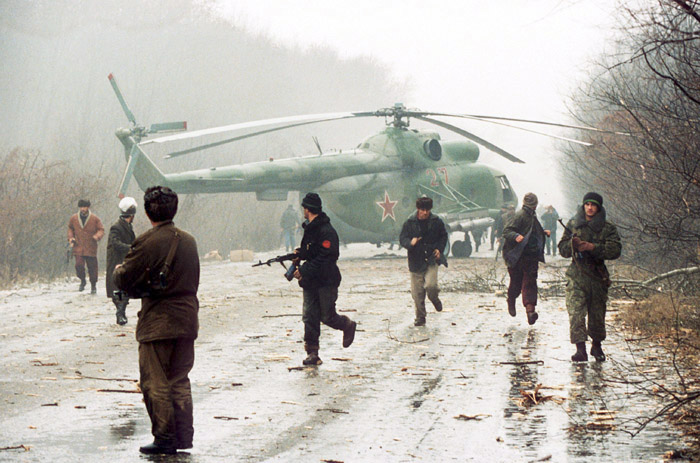
Russian Mil Mi-8 helicopter downed by Chechens near Grozny, December 1994

- 1990: Oka Crisis
- 1990: People's Movement I was a revolution to restore democracy in Nepal and end the panchayat system in Nepal.
- 1990–present: United Liberation Front of Asom launch major violent activities against Indian rule in Assam. To date, the resulting clashes with the Indian army have left more than 10,000 dead.
- 1990: 1990 Mass Uprising in Bangladesh Strikes and Protests topple the Bangladeshi military government and democracy is restored for the first time in nine years.
- 1990: The Poll tax riots were a series of riots in British towns and cities during protests against the Community Charge introduced by the government of Margaret Thatcher.
- 1990–1993: Rwandan Civil War
- 1990–1992: Anticommunist forces led a National Democratic Revolution that overthrew President Ramiz Alia and ended with an election victory by the Democratic Party of Albania, the biggest anticommunist party in Albania.
- 1990–1995: The Log Revolution in Croatia starts, triggering the Croatian War of Independence.
- 1990–1995: The First Tuareg Rebellion in Niger and Mali.
- 1991–2002: The Sierra Leone Civil War against the administration of president, Joseph Saidu Momoh.
- 1991: 1991 Iraqi uprisings
- 1991: The failed 1991 Soviet coup d'état attempt takes place, leading to the dissolution of the Soviet Union
- 1991: Chechen Revolution leading to the Declaration of Sovereignty of the Chechen Republic.
- 1991: The Ethiopian People's Revolutionary Democratic Front take control of Addis Ababa, the capital of Ethiopia, after dictator Haile Mariam Mengistu flees the country, bringing an end to the Ethiopian Civil War
- 1991: Somali National Movement rebels establish the Somaliland administration in northwestern Somalia, and declare the region independent from the rest of the country.
- 1992: 1992 Los Angeles riots
- 1992: Black May (1992) Thailand popular protest in Bangkok against the government of General Suchinda Kraprayoon and the military crackdown that followed. Up to 200,000 people demonstrated in central Bangkok at the height of the protests.
- 1992–1995: Bosnian War
- 1992: Afghan uprising against the Taliban by United Islamic Front for the Salvation of Afghanistan, or the Northern Alliance.
- 1993: Waco siege (USA)
- 1993: Pakaunė mutiny (Lithuania)
- 1994: The 1990s Uprising in Bahrain, Shiite-led rebellion for the restoration of democracy in Bahrain.
- 1994: The Zapatista Rebellion: an uprising in the Mexican state of Chiapas demanding equal rights for indigenous peoples and in opposition to growing neoliberalism in North America.
- 1994–1996: The First Chechen Rebellion against Russia.
- 1996–2006: Nepalese Civil War
- 1996: Islamic movement in Afghanistan led by the Taliban established Taliban rule.
- 1996–1997: The First Congo War in the Democratic Republic of the Congo.
- 1997: The 1997 rebellion in Albania sparked by Ponzi scheme failures.
- 1997–1999: The Republic of the Congo Civil War
- 1998: The Indonesian Revolution of 1998 resulted the resignation of President Suharto after three decades of the New Order period.
- 1998–1999: The Kosovo War
- 1998–1999: The Guinea-Bissau Civil War against the administration and government of President Joao Bernardo Vieira.
- 1998–2003: The Second Congo War in the Democratic Republic of the Congo.
- 1999–2003: The Second Liberian Civil War against the government of Liberia.
- 1999–2009: The Second Chechen Rebellion against Russia.
- 1999: The Iran student protests, July 1999 were, at the time, the most violent protests to occur against the Islamic Republic of Iran.
- 1999–2000: The Cochabamba Water War in Bolivia.

== 2000s ==
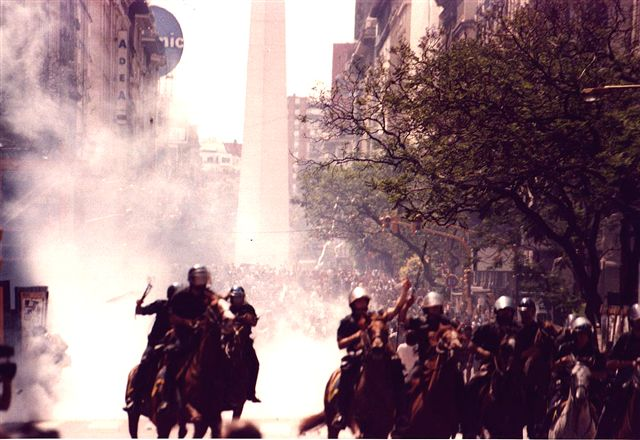
Police clash with protestors during the December 2001 riots in Argentina.

- 2000–2005: The Second Intifada, a continuation of the First Intifada, between Palestinians and Israel.
- 2000: The bloodless Bulldozer Revolution, first of the four colour revolutions (in 2000, 2003, 2004, and 2005), overthrows Slobodan Milošević's régime in Yugoslavia.
- 2001: The 2001 Macedonia conflict.
- 2001-2021: The Taliban insurgency following the 2001 war in Afghanistan which overthrew Taliban rule.
- 2001: The 2001 EDSA Revolution peacefully ousts Philippine President Joseph Estrada after the collapse of his impeachment trial.
- 2001: Supporters of former Philippine President Joseph Estrada violently and unsuccessfully stage a rally, so-called the EDSA Tres, in an attempt of returning him to power.
- 2001: Cacerolazo in Argentina. Following mass riots and a period of civil unrest, popular protests oust the government and two additional interim presidents within months. December 2001 riots in Argentina
- 2003–2005: Bolivian gas conflict.
- 2003: The Rose Revolution, second of the colour revolutions, displaces the president of Georgia, Eduard Shevardnadze, and calls new elections.
- 2003–2011: The Iraqi insurgency refers to the armed resistance by diverse groups within Iraq to the U.S. occupation of Iraq.
- 2003–present: The Darfur rebellion led by the two major rebel groups, the Sudan Liberation Movement (SLM/A) and the Justice and Equality Movement, recruited primarily from the land-tilling Fur, Zaghawa, and Massaleit ethnic groups.
- 2003–present: Conflict in the Niger Delta
- 2004–2004: The Shi'ite Uprising against the US-led occupation of Iraq.
- 2004–2005: The Orange Revolution in Ukraine. After pro-Russian prime minister Viktor Yanukovych was declared the winner of the presidential elections, people took to the streets in protest against mass fraud and vote falsification. Eventually, the country's Supreme Court ordered a recount, in which pro-Western opposition leader Viktor Yushchenko was declared the winner. This was the third colour revolution.
- 2005: A failed attempt at popular colour-style revolution in Azerbaijan, led by the groups Yox! and Azadlig.
- 2004: War in North-West Pakistan.
- 2004–present: The Naxalite insurgency in India, led by the Communist Party of India (Maoist).
- 2004–2013: The Kivu conflict in the Democratic Republic of the Congo.
- 2005: The Cedar Revolution, triggered by the assassination of former Prime Minister Rafic Hariri, asks for the withdrawal of Syrian troops from Lebanon.
- 2005: The Tulip Revolution (a.k.a. Pink/Yellow Revolution) overthrows the President of Kyrgyzstan, Askar Akayev, and set new elections. This is the fourth colour revolution.
- 2005: Paraguayan People's Army insurgency.
- 2005: 15 April Intifada – Arab uprising in the Iranian province of Khuzestan.
- 2005: Ecuador experiences a nationwide and countrywide revolution, consisting of rallies and demonstrations, rioting and protests in March–April 2005 from indigenous tribes that started with a protest that mushroomed into a widespread uprising and popular movement that led to the overthrow of the government.
- 2006: 2006 democracy movement in Nepal was a revolution against Undemocratic rule of King Gyanendra.
- 2006: The 2006 Oaxaca protests demanding the removal of Ulises Ruiz Ortiz, the governor of Oaxaca state in Mexico.
- 2006–present: The Mexican drug war.
- 2007: The Lawyers' Movement in Pakistan emerged to restore a judge but eventually moved to rebel against the military dictatorship of General Pervez Musharraf.
- 2007–2015: The Civil war in Ingushetia.
- 2007–2009: The Second Tuareg Rebellion in Niger.
- 2007: The Burmese anti-government protests, including the Saffron Revolution of Burmese Buddhist monks.
- 2008: 2008 Armenian presidential election protests.
- 2008: 2008 Kashmir Unrest.
- 2008: A Shiite uprising in Basra.
- 2008: Attacks in Lanao del Norte in the Philippines by the Moro Islamic Liberation Front led by Kumander Bravo and Umbrfa Kato.
- 2008: Anti-austerity protests in Ireland
- 2008: 2008 Tibetan unrest.
- 2009: 2009 Iranian presidential election protests, leading to development of Iranian Green Movement
- 2009: 2009 Bangladesh Rifles revolt took place in Dhaka, Bangladesh killing 57 army officers.
- 2009–2011: A civil uprising popularly known as the Kitchenware Revolution brought down the Icelandic government after the collapse of the country's financial system in October 2008.
- 2009: The 2009 Malagasy political crisis in the Madagascar.
- 2009: The Dongo conflict In the Democratic Republic of the Congo.
- 2009–present: Somali Civil War (2009–present).
- 2009–2015: South Yemen insurgency.
- 2009: 2009 Boko Haram uprising.
- 2009–2017: Insurgency in the North Caucasus.

== 2010s ==
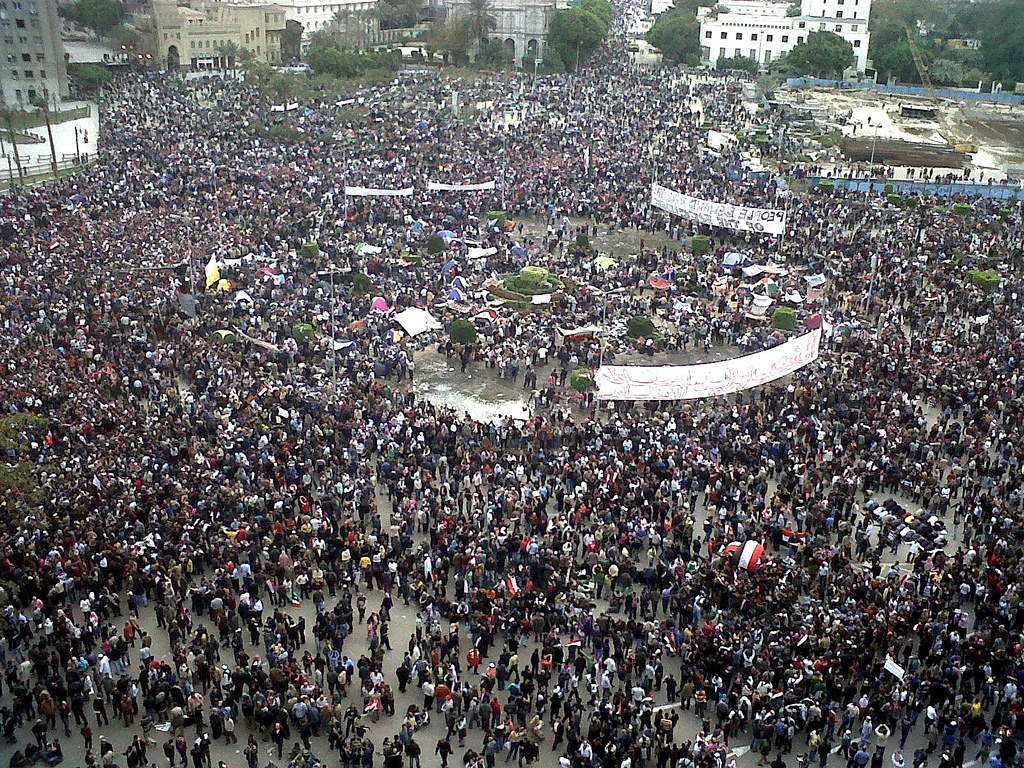
Tahrir Square protest during the Arab Spring in Egypt.

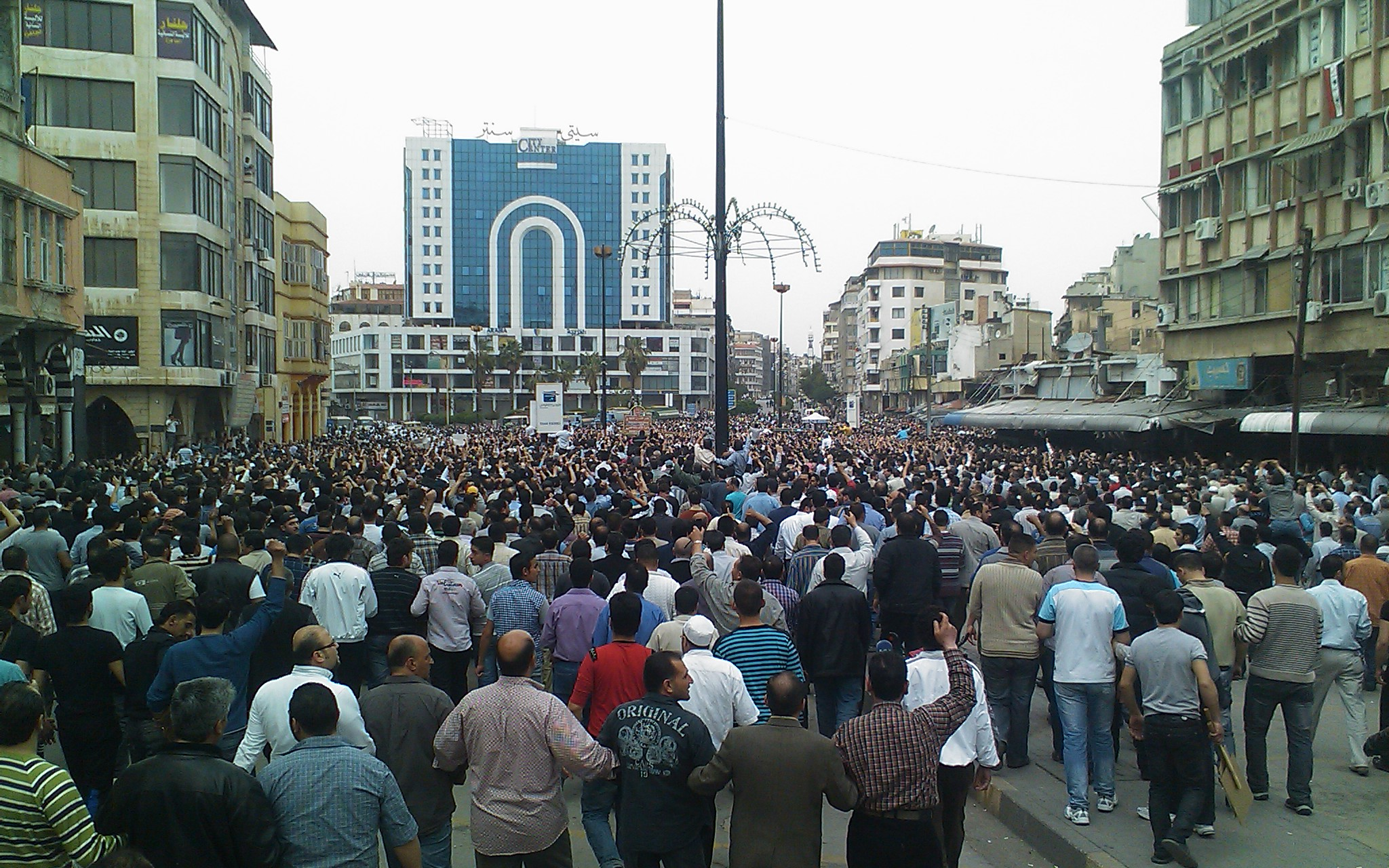
Demonstration in Homs against the Syrian government, 18 April 2011.

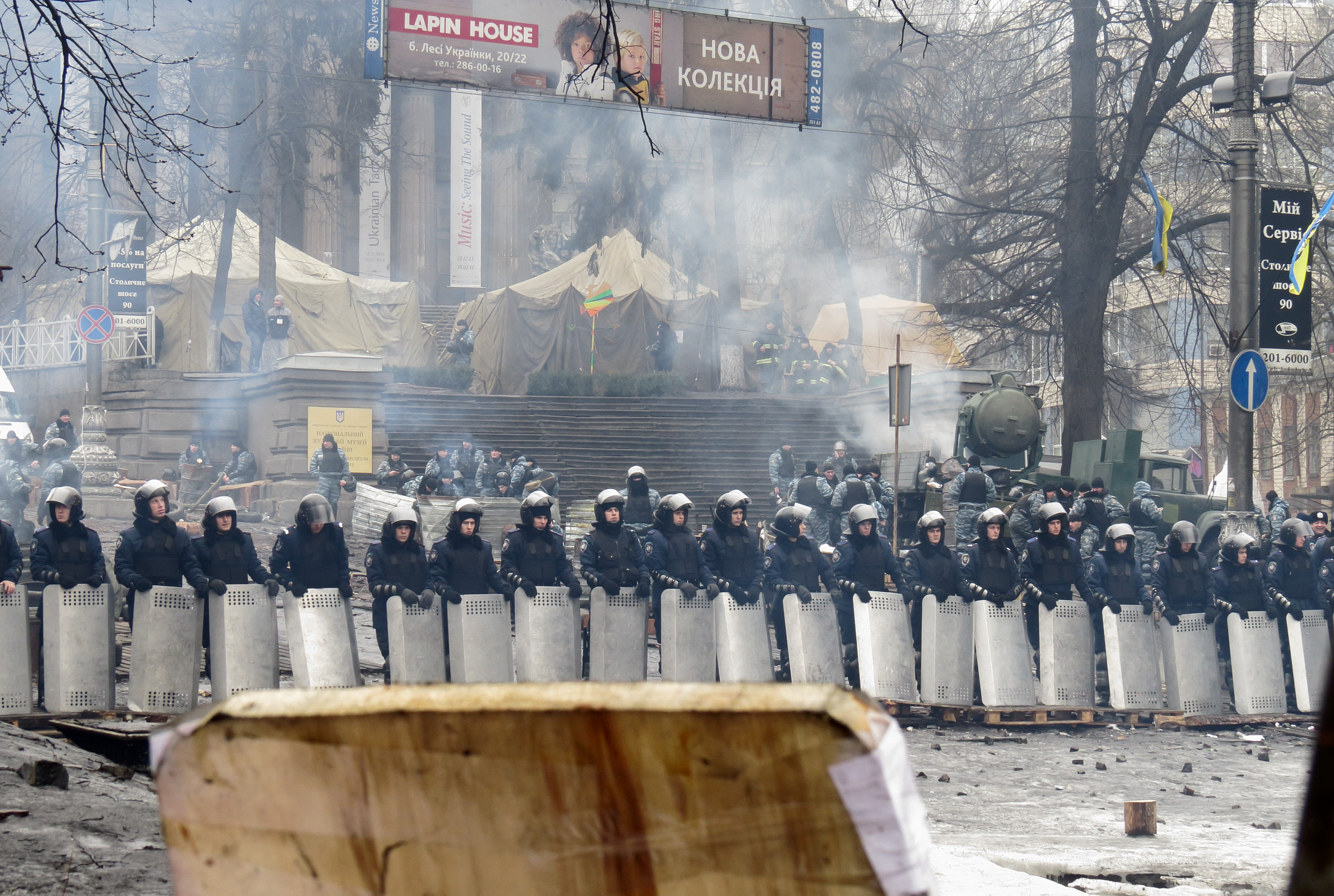
A line of riot police in the city of Kyiv during the 2014 Ukrainian revolution.

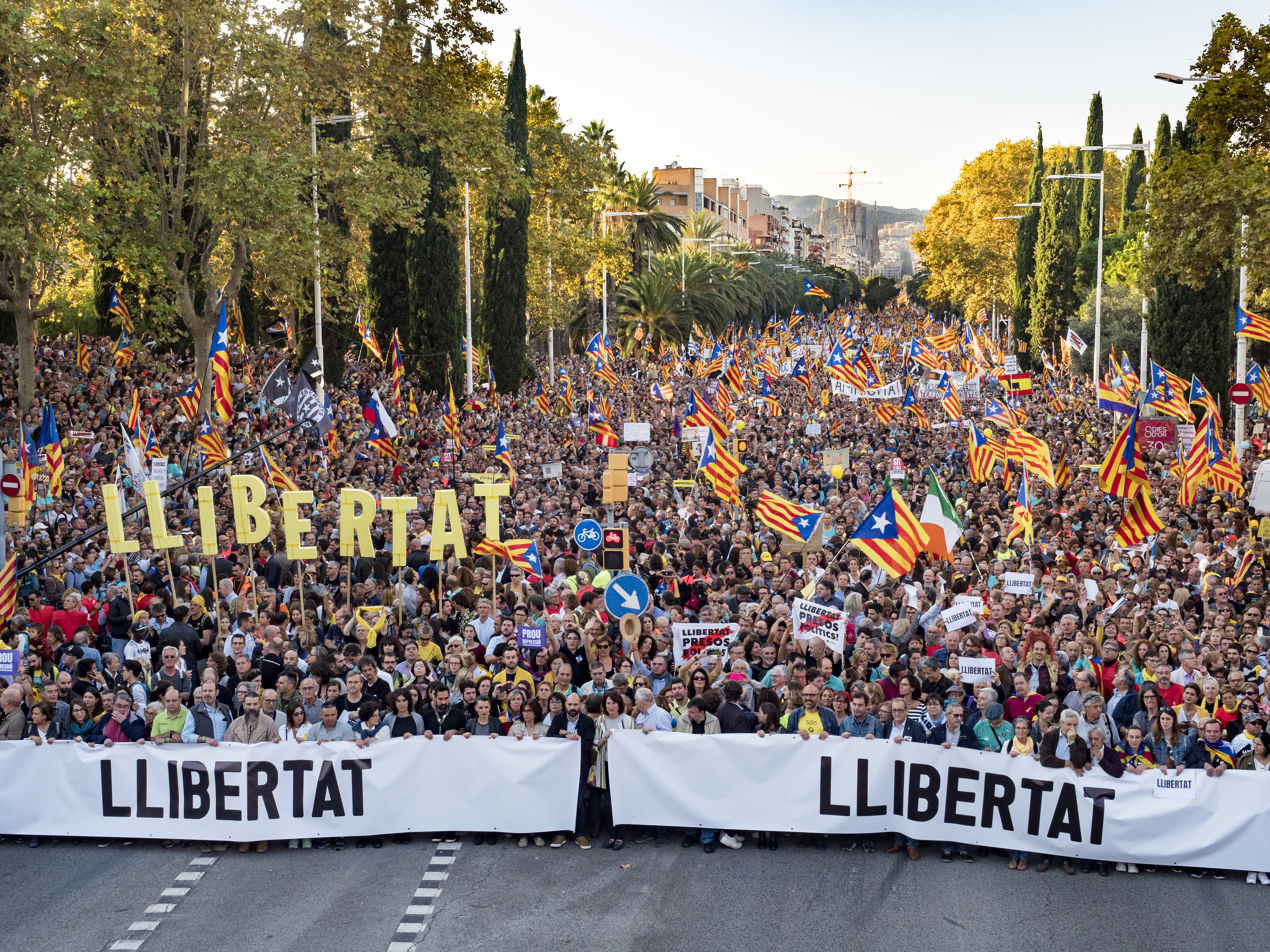
The sentencing of nine Catalan independence leaders in a 2019 trial triggered protests in Catalonia.

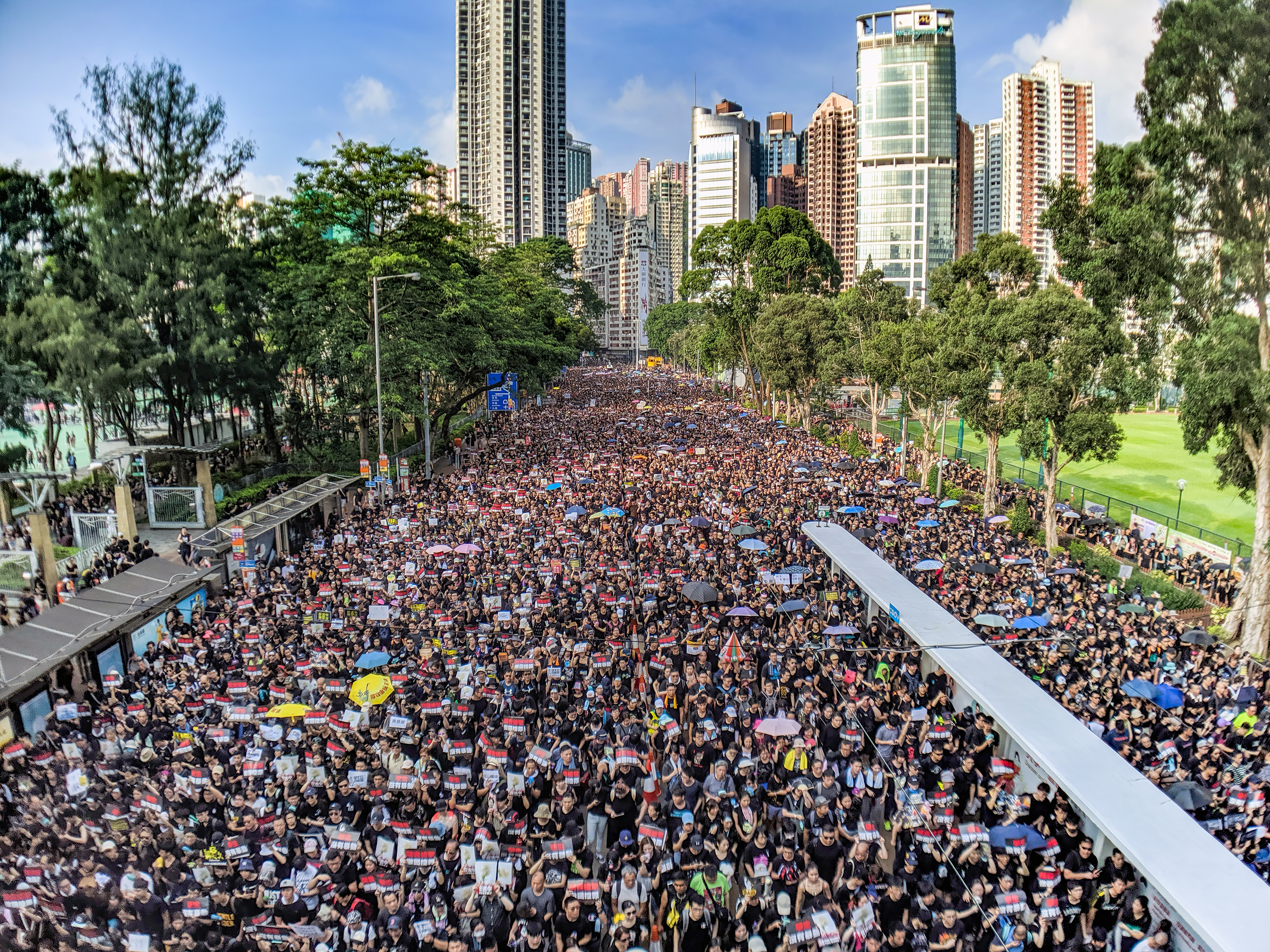
2019–2020 Hong Kong protests

- 2010–2011: 2010–2011 Ivorian crisis.
- 2010–2012: Tajikistan insurgency.
- 2010: Kyrgyz Revolution of 2010.
- 2010: Kashmir Unrest 2010.
- 2010–2012: Anti-austerity movement in Greece
- 2010–2012: Arab Spring:
  - The Tunisian revolution (2010–2011) forces President Zine El Abidine Ben Ali to resign and flee the country, and sets free elections.
  - The 2011 Egyptian revolution brings down the regime of President Hosni Mubarak.
  - The 2011 Libyan Civil War in which rebel forces gradually take control of the country, and kill leader Muammar Gaddafi following NATO-led intervention in the war.
  - 2011 Post-civil war violence in Libya.
  - Syrian Revolution.
  - Bahraini uprising of 2011.
  - 2011 Yemeni Revolution, the revolt that led to the eventual resignation of Ali Abdullah Saleh as President of Yemen.
- 2011–2023: Sinai insurgency.
- 2011: Cherán uprising.
- 2011: Wukan protests in China.
- 2011–2020: Sudanese conflict in South Kordofan and Blue Nile
- 2011–2017: Syrian civil war spillover in Lebanon
- 2011–present: Ethnic violence in South Sudan.
- Iraqi insurgency (2011–2013).
- 2011–2013 Maldives political crisis: Public protests and police mutiny led to resignation of President Mohamed Nasheed.
- 2011–2012: Occupy movement.
- 2011: 2011 Rome city uprising
- 2012–present: Rojava conflict in Syrian Kurdistan.
- 2012–2015: Northern Mali conflict.
  - 2012–2012: 2012 Tuareg rebellion.
- 2012–present: Central African Republic conflict–François Bozizé, president of the Central African Republic, is overthrown by the rebel coalition Séléka, led by Michel Djotodia.
- 2012–2013: M23 rebellion.
- 2012–2015 unrest in Romania.
- 2013: 2013 Protests in Brazil
- 2013 Eritrean Army mutiny.
- 2013: Gezi Park protests in Turkey.
- 2013–present: Turkey–ISIL conflict.
- 2013 South Sudanese political crisis.
- 2013–14 Tunisian protests against the Ennahda-led government.
- 2013–2020: South Sudanese Civil War.
- RENAMO insurgency (2013–2019).
- 2013–2014: Euromaidan.
  - Revolution of Dignity.
- 2013–14 Thai political crisis.
- 2013–14 Cambodian protests.
- 2014–present: 2014 Protests in Venezuela.
- Iraqi Civil War (2014–2017).
- 2014 pro-Russian unrest in Ukraine.
- 2014–2020: Second Libyan Civil War.
- 2014: Abkhazian Revolution.
- 2014: The Umbrella Revolution of Hong Kong
- 2014 Burkinabé uprising.
- 2014: Ferguson unrest in Missouri
- 2015–present: Yemeni Civil War (2015–present).
- Burundian unrest (2015–18).
- 2015–present: Kurdish–Turkish conflict (2015–present).
- 2015–2022: ISIL insurgency in Tunisia.
- 2015: 2015 Baltimore protests
- 2016–present: 2016 Niger Delta conflict.
- 2016 Ethiopian protests.
- 2016 Mong Kok civil unrest, also known as "Fishball Revolution" in Mong Kok, Hong Kong
- 2016 Turkish coup d'état attempt, a failed military coup.
- 2016–2019: Kamwina Nsapu rebellion
- 2017–present: Anglophone Crisis, also known as the Ambazonia War, or the Cameroonian Civil War.
- 2016–17 South Korean protests, or Candlelight Revolution, in South Korea.
- 2016–17 Kashmir unrest.
- 2016–17: United States election protests – protests challenging the outcome of the 2016 United States presidential election.
- 2017 Ivory Coast mutiny.
- 2017: 2017 Military Police of Espírito Santo strike in Espírito Santo, Brazil.
- 2017–18 Spanish constitutional crisis in Catalonia.
- 2017–2018 Romanian protests.
- 2017–2018 Iranian protests.
- 2018–present: 2018–19 Arab protests:
  - 2018 Jordanian protests.
  - 2018–2019: Sudanese revolution, which resulted in the ouster of the President.
  - 2019–2020 Algerian protests, also called Revolution of Smiles or Hirak Movement.
  - 2019–present: 2019 Iraqi protests, also nicknamed the October Revolution, and 2019 Iraqi Intifada.
  - 2019–present: 2019–20 Lebanese protests, also referred to as the Lebanese revolt.
- 2018–2025: Kurdish pro-SDF insurgency in northern Syria, also known as "Afrin insurgency"
- 2018 Armenian Velvet Revolution, which resulted in the ouster of the Prime Minister.
- 2018–2019 Gaza border protests, also referred to by organizers as the "Great March of Return".
- 2018–2020: 2018–20 Nicaraguan protests.
- 2018–2019: 2018–2019 Haitian protests.
- 2018–2019 Ingushetia protests
- 2018–present: Yellow vests protests.
- 2019–2020: 2019–2020 Hong Kong protests
- 2019 Papua protests.
- 2019 Indonesian protests and riots.
- 2019 Puerto Rico Anti-Corruption / Chat scandal Protest.
- 2019–present: Dutch farmers' protests.
- 2019 Ecuadorian protests.
- 2019 Catalan protests.
- 2019–2022 Chilean protests, also called "Estallido social".
- 2019 Bolivian protests
- 2019–2020 Iranian protests.
- 2019–2020: Citizenship Amendment Act protests, in India.

== 2020s ==
- Protests against responses to the COVID-19 pandemic – a series of protests around the world against various governments' responses to the COVID-19 pandemic, particularly lockdowns
  - Strikes during the COVID-19 pandemic – strikes against wages or low hazard pay, insufficient workplace hazard controls, such as a lack of personal protective equipment or social distancing, high rents or evictions, and the pandemic's general economic impact
- 2020–2023 United States racial unrest – a series of protests against racial inequality and police brutality in the United States, sometimes in favor of abolishing or defunding the police
  - George Floyd protests
  - Breonna Taylor protests
  - Kenosha unrest
  - 2020–2023 Minneapolis–Saint Paul racial unrest
- 2020–2021 Bulgarian protests – protests against Boyko Borisov's government
- 2020–2021 Belarusian protests – protests against Alexander Lukashenko's government
- 2020–2021 Thai protests – pro-democracy protests for reform to the Thai monarchy and against the 2017 Thai Constitution and Prime Minister Prayut Chan-o-cha's government
- 2020 Malian protests, also called "Malian Spring"
- 2020 Inner Mongolia protests
- 2020–2021 women's strike protests in Poland – protests against a Constitutional Tribunal ruling restricting abortion
- End SARS protests – protests to abolish the Special Anti-Robbery Squad in Nigeria (2020)
- 2020 Kyrgyz Revolution, also called the Third Kyrgyz Revolution
- Indonesia omnibus law protests – protests against the Omnibus Law on Job Creation
- 2020 Peruvian protests – protests against the impeachment and removal of Martín Vizcarra
- 2020 Guatemalan protests
- 2020–2021 Indian farmers' protest – protests against the 2020 Indian agriculture acts
- Tigray War – the conflict started as an uprising in Ethiopia's Tigray region led by the TPLF, but then developed into a civil war in Northern Ethiopia
- 2020-2021 United States election protests – protests challenging the legitimacy of the results in the 2020 United States presidential election
  - January 6 United States Capitol attack
  - Attempts to overturn the 2020 United States presidential election
- 2021 Boğaziçi University protests
- 2021 Tunisian protests
- 2021-present Myanmar protests, also called the Spring Revolution, followed by the escalated civil war
- 2021 Greek protests
- 2021 Bangladesh anti-Modi protests
- 2021 Northern Ireland riots
- 2021 Colombian protests
- 2021 Senegalese protests
- 2021-2023 Eswatini protests
- 2021 South African unrest
- 2021 Brazilian protests
- 2021 Cuban protests, also called the Cuba Libre movement
- 2021–2022 Iranian protests
- Republican insurgency in Afghanistan
- 2021–2022 Afghan protests
- 2021 Solomon Islands unrest
- 2021–2022 Serbian environmental protests
- 2022 Kazakh unrest, also called Bloody January
- Protests against the Russian invasion of Ukraine
  - Anti-war protests in Russia (2022–present)
- Canada convoy protest
- 2022 Sri Lankan protests
- 2022 Corsica unrest
- 2022 Azadi March I
- 2022 Karakalpak protests
- 2022 Ecuadorian protests
- 2022 Peruvian economic protests
- 2022 Iranian food protests
- 2022–2023 Mahsa Amini protests in Iran
- 2022–2023 Brazilian election protests
  - 2023 Brazilian Congress attack
- 2022 Azadi March II
- Moldovan protests (2022–2023)
- 2022 COVID-19 protests in China
- 2022 Mongolian protests
- 2022–2023 Peruvian protests
- 2023 French pension reform unrest
- 2023–2024 Georgian protests
- October 7 attacks
- 2023 Gaza war protests
- War in Sudan (2023)
- Wagner Group rebellion
- Kenya Finance Bill protests – a series of protests against the Kenya Finance Bill 2024
- July uprising
- 2024 Venezuelan protests
- 2024–2025 Mozambican protests
- 2024 Abkhazian protests
- 2024–2025 Georgian protests
- 2024–2025 Romanian election annulment protests
- 2025 Slovak protests
- 2025 Turkish protests
- 2025 Nepalese Gen Z protests
- 2025–2026 Iranian protests

== See also ==
- List of civil wars
- List of cultural, intellectual, philosophical and technological revolutions
- List of films about revolution
- List of guerrillas
- List of invasions
- List of peasant revolts
- List of rebellions in China
- List of riots
- List of strikes
- Uprisings led by women
- List of usurpers
- List of wars of independence (national liberation)
- List of women who led a revolt or rebellion
- Political history of the world
- Slave rebellion (including list of North American slave revolts)
