= Ivan Tsykler =

Russian nobleman

Ivan Yeliseevich Tsykler (Tzykler) (Russian: Ива́н Елисе́евич Ци́клер, before 1660 – 20 February [O.S. 4 March] 1697) was a Russian nobleman who was dismembered in 1697 on charges of conspiracy against Peter the Great.

== Biography ==
Tsykler was the son of a colonel from the foreign order regiment. He was drafted into military service in 1671, and appointed stolnik after eight years of service as a Strelets sub-colonel. In 1682, he became a companion to the statesmen Fyodor Shaklovity and Ivan Miloslavsky. He was a campaigner for Sophia of Russia, who trusted him as her most faithful follower. Along with colonel Ivan Ozerov he funded the construction of the Streltsy pillar, a short-lived monument on the Red Square commemorating the Streltsy uprising of 1682.

In 1687–1688, Tsykler took part in the first Crimean campaign of Vasily Galitzine. In 1689, after Peter I's revolt against Sophia, Tsykler informed him of Sophia's conspiracy; for this he was elevated to the rank of Duma nobleman and was sent as a voivode to Verkhoturie. In 1696, he was recalled to Moscow to build fortresses on the shore of the Azov sea.

Many considered this appointment an honorable exile, but Peter I's increasing cruelty towards opponents of his reforms motivated Tsykler to plot against him. Other participants involved were okolnichiy Alexei Sokovnin and stolnik Matvei Pushkin. In February 1697, two Strelets, Yelizariev and Silin, notified Peter about Tsykler's plan to burn down the house in which the tsar was residing. Upon hearing this, Peter immediately personally arrested them and put them on trial.

During the trial, Tsykler explained under torture that he was motivated by Peter's reproaches against his friendship with Miloslavsky. He also partially incriminated Sophia, leading to her imprisonment in the Novodevichy Convent. The exhumed corpse of Miloslavsky, who had died in 1685, was put under the scaffold during the execution of the conspirators. Following the execution on 20 February [O.S. 4 March] 1697, the heads of Tsykler and his accomplices were put on pikes and exhibited in Red Square. Trykler's two sons were exiled to Kursk and forbidden to return to Moscow under the tsar's decree.

== Sources ==
- Brockhaus and Efron Encyclopedic Dictionary. Циклер, Иван Елисеевич (in Russian).
