= Khovanshchina (film) =

Khovanshchina Хованщина
- Directed by: Vera Stroyeva
- Written by: Anna Abramova; Dmitri Shostakovich
- Starring: Aleksei Krivchenya; Anton Grigoriev; Yevgeny Kibkalo; Mark Reizen
- Cinematography: V.V. Dombrovsky
- Music by: Modest Mussorgsky (Adapted by Dmitri Shostakovich)
- Production company: Mosfilm
- Distributed by: Artkino Pictures (United States)
- Release date: 1960
- Running time: 124 minutes
- Country: Soviet Union
- Language: Russian

Khovanshchina (Russian: Хованщина) is a 1959 Soviet musical drama film, directed by Vera Stroyeva and based on the eponymous opera by 19th-century Russian composer Modest Mussorgsky. For his adaptation of Mussorgsky's score, Dmitri Shostakovich was nominated for an Academy Award for Best Scoring of a Musical Picture. The music was conducted by Yevgeny Svetlanov.

== Cast ==
- Aleksei Krivchenya as Prince Ivan Khovansky, head of the Streltsy
- Anton Grigoriev as Prince Andrei Khovansky, son of Ivan Khovansky
- Yevgeny Kibkalo as Boyar Fyodor Shaklovity
- Mark Reizen as Dosifey, leader of the Old Believers
- Kira Leonova as Marfa, an Old Believer
- Vladimir Petrov as Prince Vasily Golitsin
- Aleksei Maslennikov as Kuzka, a young strelets
- Maya Plisetskaya as Persian slave
