= Khovanshchina =

Opera by Modest Mussorgsky

- national music drama by Modest Mussorgsky
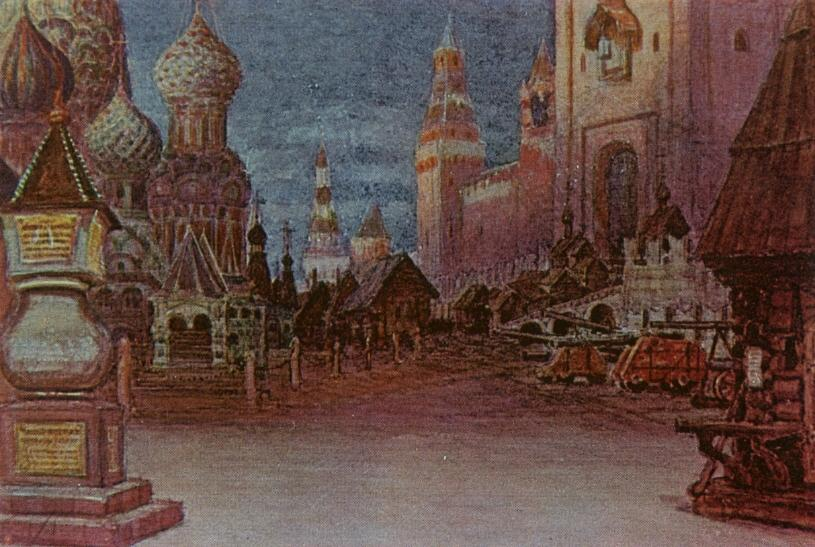
- Scene design by Apollinariy Vasnetsov for the Russian Private Opera, Moscow, 1897), showing the Red Square
- Native title: Хованщина
- Language: Russian
- Premiere: 9 February 1886; Petersburg

Khovanshchina (Russian: Хованщина, IPA: [xɐˈvanʲɕːɪnə], sometimes rendered The Khovansky Affair) is an opera (subtitled a 'national music drama') in five acts by Modest Mussorgsky. The work was written between 1872 and 1880 in St. Petersburg, Russia. The composer wrote the libretto based on historical sources. The opera was almost finished in piano score when the composer died in 1881, but the orchestration was almost entirely lacking.

Like Mussorgsky's earlier Boris Godunov, Khovanshchina deals with an episode in Russian history, first brought to the composer's attention by his friend the critic Vladimir Stasov. It concerns the rebellion of Prince Ivan Khovansky, the Old Believers, and the Muscovite Streltsy against the regent Sofia Alekseyevna and the two young Tsars Peter the Great and Ivan V, who were attempting to institute Westernizing reforms in Russia. Khovansky had helped to foment the Moscow Uprising of 1682, which resulted in Sofia becoming regent on behalf of her younger brother Ivan and half-brother Peter, who were crowned joint Tsars. In the fall of 1682 Prince Ivan Khovansky turned against Sofia. Supported by the Old Believers and the Streltsy, Khovansky – who supposedly wanted to install himself as the new regent – demanded the reversal of Patriarch Nikon's reforms. Sofia and her court were forced to flee Moscow. Eventually, Sofia managed to suppress the so-called Khovanshchina (Khovansky affair) with the help of the diplomat Fyodor Shaklovity, who succeeded Khovansky as leader of the Muscovite Streltsy. With the rebellion crushed, the Old Believers committed mass suicide (in the opera, at least).

Nikolai Rimsky-Korsakov completed, revised, and orchestrated Khovanshchina in 1881–1882. In 1958, Dmitri Shostakovich was commissioned to revise and reorchestrate the opera for a film version released the following year. It is the Shostakovich version which is now usually performed. In 1913, Igor Stravinsky and Maurice Ravel made their own arrangement at Sergei Diaghilev's request. When Feodor Chaliapin refused to sing the part of Dosifey in any other orchestration than Rimsky-Korsakov's, Diaghilev's company employed a mixture of orchestrations which did not prove successful. The Stravinsky-Ravel orchestration was forgotten, except for Stravinsky's finale, which is still sometimes used.

Although the background of the opera comprises the Moscow Uprising of 1682 and the Khovansky affair a few months later, its main themes are the struggle between progressive and reactionary political factions during the minority of Tsar Peter the Great and the passing of old Muscovy before Peter's westernizing reforms. It received its first performance in the Rimsky-Korsakov edition in 1886.

== History ==
=== Compositional history ===
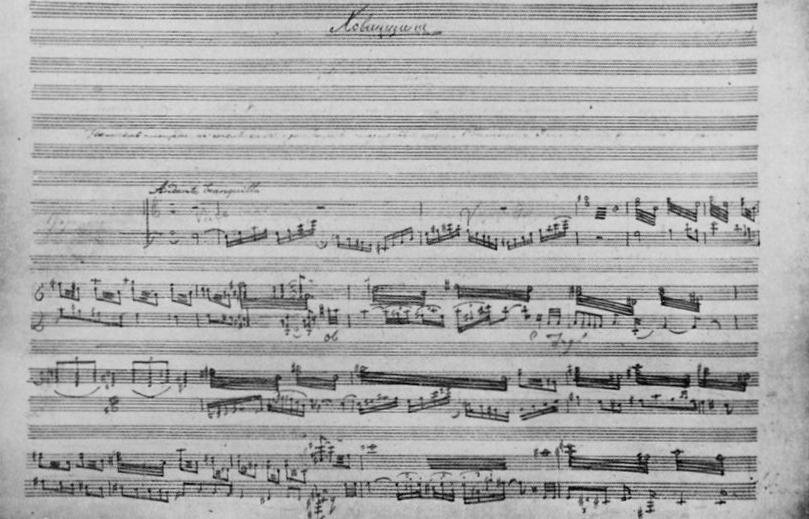
Autograph vocal score of Khovanshchina, featuring "Dawn on the Moscow River" (1874)

Action	Completion date (latest)	Remarks
Act 1
1. Prelude: Dawn over the Moscow River	4 September 1874	First mentioned to Dmitry Stasov on 2 August 1873
2. Streltsy talk, Kuzka sings	2 August 1873	Mentioned to Stasov on 2 August 1873
3. Scribe arrives; Shaklovity dictates his denunciation	23 July 1873	First mentioned to Stasov on 23 July 1873
4. The crowd enters and forces the Scribe to read the proclamation	2 January 1875	Omitted from Rimsky-Korsakov's version. Begun 1873.
5. Ivan Khovansky enters with Streltsy	18 May 1876	
6. Emma, Andrey, and Marfa	18 May 1876	Shortened in Rimsky-Korsakov's version, but not according to Mussorgsky's final 1879 libretto
7. Return of Ivan Khovansky, who desires Emma for himself; entry of Dosifey, who berates everyone	18 May 1876	Shortened in Rimsky-Korsakov's version
8. Dosifey's lament	30 July 1875	
Act 2
1. Golitsin reads Sophia's letter	7 August 1875	
2. Golitsin reads his mother's letter	7 August 1875	Omitted from Rimsky-Korsakov's version
3. Golitsin with the Pastor	2 August 1875	Omitted from Rimsky-Korsakov's version, and Mussorgsky's final plan
4. Marfa's fortune-telling	20 August 1870	Originally written for the projected opera Bobyl. Final version from 24 July 1878.
5. Ivan Khovansky arrives; quarrel ensues	16 August 1876	Shortened in Rimsky-Korsakov's version
6. Arrival of Dosifey	14 October 1875	Shortened in Rimsky-Korsakov's version
7. Marfa returns; Shaklovity's entry	12 September 1876	
8. [Unwritten ending]		Rimsky-Korsakov reprises the Dawn theme, while Shostakovich adds a foreshadowing of the Preobrazhensky March. Mussorgsky first intended to close with a single chord, but later decided on a final quintet.
Act 3
1. Chorus of Old Believers	31 December 1875	
2. Marfa's song	18 August 1873	Orchestrated by Mussorgsky, 24–25 November 1879. Originally written in F major; Mussorgsky later transposed it to G major, allowing the Old Believer's chorus to connect to it.
3. Confrontation between Marfa and Susanna	5 September 1873	In Rimsky-Korsakov's version, connecting bars are written to make it possible to cut this scene. Mussorgsky later shortened this scene.
4. Intervention of Dosifey and Marfa's confession	13 February 1876	Mussorgsky later shortened this scene.
5. Shaklovity's aria	6 January 1876	
6. Streltsy enter	30 May 1876	Orchestrated by Mussorgsky
7. Streltsy's wives scold them about their drinking	30 May 1876	
8. Kuzka's celebration	22 September 1876	Omitted from Rimsky-Korsakov's version
9. Scribe arrives with news of Tsar Peter's attack on the Streltsy	10 June 1880	
10. Appeal to Ivan Khovansky, who decides against fighting Tsar Peter	10 June 1880	
Act 4, scene 1
1. Ivan Khovansky at home, being entertained	5 August 1880	
2. Dance of the Persian Slaves	16 April 1876	Orchestrated by Rimsky-Korsakov, with Mussorgsky's approval, within his lifetime
3. Shaklovity arrives; song in honor of Ivan Khovansky; Khovansky murdered	5 August 1880	
Act 4, scene 2
1. Golitsin's exile	23 May 1880	Based on Marfa's fortune-telling, which had predicted this event
2. Dosifey with Marfa	23 May 1880	First mentioned to Stasov on 25 December 1876
3. Andrey confronts Marfa about Emma	7–8 July 1879	First mentioned by Stasov to Mussorgsky on 15 August 1873
4. Streltsy enter	23 May 1880	
5. Streltsy's wives plead that their husbands not be pardoned	23 May 1880	
6. Preobrazhensky March; Streshnev relates Peter's pardon of the Streltsy	23 May 1880	
Act 5
1. Dosifey's aria	14 April 1880	Mentioned to Stasov on 14 August 1873. Expanded by Rimsky-Korsakov with material from Dosifey's act 1 lament
2. Andrey searches for Emma; Marfa sings to him	10 September 1879	Mentioned in letters as early as 23 July 1873, but complete manuscript lost: only vocal parts survive
3. Dosifey returns	28 August 1880	
4. Love Requiem	10 September 1879	Composed, but not written down. Reconstructed by Rimsky-Korsakov in his version: this reconstruction is also used by Shostakovich
5. Final chorus	17 August 1880	Based on an Old Believer melody, and not finished by Mussorgsky (or lost). Rimsky-Korsakov uses this tune and reprises Preobrazhensky march. Shostakovich keeps Rimsky-Korsakov's chorus and adds a reprise of the Dawn. Stravinsky bases his chorus on Mussorgsky's designated melody, as well as two other themes related to the Old Believers (their act 3 chorus and the orchestral motive that opens act 5).

The libretto was written out by 1879, and shows some inconsistencies with the actual text set to music. The above table is based on those of Richard Taruskin (in Musorgsky: Eight Essays and an Epilogue) and Pavel Lamm (in the preface to his edition of the vocal score).

=== Performance history ===
The St. Petersburg and world premiere took place on 21 February (9 February O.S.), 1886 using the Rimsky-Korsakov edition. Also in St. Petersburg on 27 October 1893 the opera was presented by artists of the Russian Opera Society.

The Russian Private Opera presented the Moscow premiere at the Solodovnikov Theater on 12 November 1897 conducted by Michele Esposito, with scene designs by Konstantin Korovin, Apollinary Vasnetsov, and Sergey Malyutin. There were 1910 and 1911 productions in the two cities, the first by the Zimin Opera in Moscow and conducted by Palitsīn scenes by Matorin, while the second was at St. Petersburg's Mariinsky Theatre and conducted by Albert Coates.

Khovanshchina reached the Théâtre des Champs-Élysées in Paris in 1913, where Emil Cooper (Kuper) conducted a Diaghilev production, in a new orchestration written collaboratively by Igor Stravinsky and Maurice Ravel. Because Feodor Chaliapin was unwilling to sing Dosifei in any orchestration other than Rimsky-Korsakov's, the Parisians heard a hybrid version which proved unsuccessful, and this orchestration was forgotten. Only the finale, which was composed by Stravinsky, has survived and was published in 1914. It occasionally replaces Dmitri Shostakovich's finale in some productions, such as Claudio Abbado's 1989 production in Vienna.

Also in 1913, it was presented in London at the Theatre Royal Drury Lane. It was produced in New York for the first time in 1931.

The Shostakovich version, in Pavel Lamm's edition, was first presented on 25 November 1960 at the Kirov Theater, conducted by Sergey Yeltsin with sets designed by Fedorovsky.

Khovanshchina was not staged by New York's Metropolitan Opera until 1950, although excerpts were performed by the Met as early as 1919. The 1950 production was sung in English and featured Risë Stevens as Marfa, Lawrence Tibbett as Prince Ivan and Jerome Hines as Dosifei. The sets and costumes were designed by the Russo-Lithuanian artist Mstislav Dobuzhinsky. That production received only four performances in 1950, and the Met did not stage Khovanshchina again until 1985, this time in Russian.

The new production was staged by August Everding, designed by Ming Cho Lee, and used the Shostakovich orchestration, with Martti Talvela as Dosifei and Natalia Rom as Emma. It has since been revived several times at the Met, most recently in a 2012 run, during which Stravinsky's final scene was employed there for the first time. Performances of Khovanshchina by visiting Russian companies have also appeared at the Met. More recently, it was performed by Welsh National Opera in both Wales and England as well as at the Bayerische Staatsoper in Munich under Kent Nagano in 2007.

Khovanshchina is not seen on stage often outside Russia, but it has been recorded complete 23 times, including seven videos.

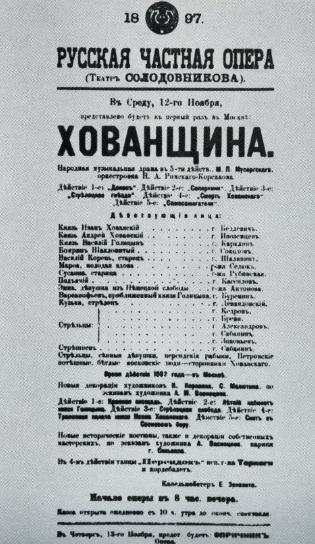
Affiche for a performance at the Solodovnikov Theatre (Moscow, 1897)

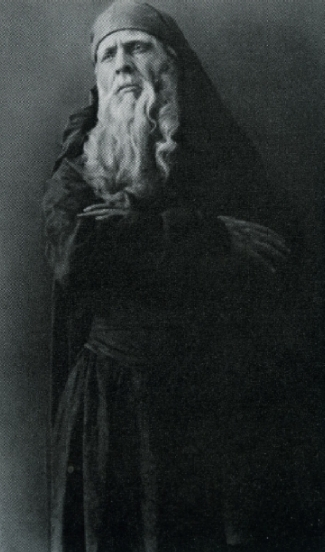
Fyodor Shalyapin as Dosifey (Russian Private Opera (Mamontov's Private Russian Opera in Moscow), Moscow, 1897)

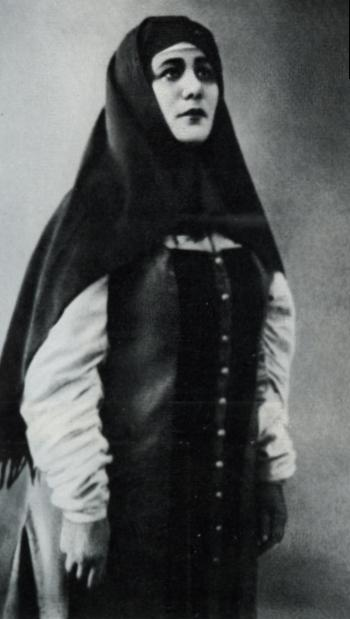
Yevgeniya Zbruyeva as Marfa (Mariinsky Theatre, St. Petersburg, 1911)

== Roles ==
Role	Voice type	Moscow cast Russian Private Opera 12 November 1897 Moscow (Conductor: Michele Esposito)	Moscow cast Zimin Opera 1910 (Conductor: Palitsyn)	St. Petersburg cast Mariinsky Theatre, 1911 (Conductor: Albert Coates)
Prince Ivan Khovansky, head of the Streltsy	bass	Anton Bedlevich	Kapiton Zaporozhets	Vasily Sharonov
Prince Andrey Khovansky, his son	tenor	Pyotr Inozemtsev		Andrey Labinsky
Prince Vasily Golitsin	tenor	Yekab Karklin	Anton Sekar-Rozhansky	Ivan Yershov
Dosifey, head of the schismatics (Old Believers)	bass	Fyodor Shalyapin	Vasily Petrov	Fyodor Shalyapin
Boyar Fyodor Shaklovity	baritone	I. Sokolov	Nikolay Shevelyov	Pavel Andreyev
Marfa, a schismatic	mezzo-soprano	Serafima Selyuk-Roznatovskaya	Vera Petrova-Zvantseva	Yevgeniya Zbruyeva
Susanna, an old schismatic	soprano	Anastasya Rubinskaya		Yelena Nikolayeva
Scrivener	tenor	Grigiriy Kassilov		Grigoriy Ugrinovich
Emma, a maiden from the German quarter	soprano	Varvara Antonova		Marya Kovalenko
Pastor	baritone	Nikolay Kedrov		
Varsonofyev, a retainer of Golitsin	baritone	Mikhail Malinin (father of Boris Malinin and Marina Raskova)		
Kuzka, a strelets (musketeer)	tenor	Mikhail Levandovsky		Vladimir Losev
Streshnev, a Boyar	tenor			
Chorus: Streltsy, schismatics, serving girls and Persian slaves of Prince Ivan Khovansky, people

Mussorgsky refers to Marfa as a contralto in a letter to Vladimir Stasov on 16 January 1876. Varsonofyev's part is written in the bass clef in his act 2 appearance, as expected for a bass or baritone; but it is written in the treble clef (presumably meant to sound an octave lower) in his act 4 appearance, as expected for a tenor.

== Instrumentation ==
Rimsky-Korsakov Edition:

- Strings: violins I, violins II, violas, cellos, double basses
- Woodwinds: 3 flutes (3rd doubling piccolo), 2 oboes (2nd doubling english horn), 2 clarinets, 2 bassoons
- Brass: 4 horns, 2 trumpets, 3 trombones, 1 tuba
- Percussion: timpani, bass drum, snare drum, triangle, tambourine, cymbals, tam-tam, bells
- Other: piano, harp
- On/Offstage: 3 trumpets, wind band

Shostakovich Orchestration:

- Strings: violins I, violins II, violas, cellos, double basses
- Woodwinds: 3 flutes (3rd doubling piccolo), 3 oboes (3rd doubling English horn), 3 clarinets (3rd doubling bass clarinet), 3 bassoons (3rd doubling contrabassoon)
- Brass: 4 horns, 3 trumpets, 3 trombones, 1 tuba
- Percussion: timpani, bass drum, snare drum, triangle, tambourine, cymbals, tam-tam, bells, glockenspiel
- Other: piano, harp, celesta
- On/Offstage: unspecified numbers of horns, trumpets, trombones

== Historical basis of the plot ==
The death of the young Tsar Fyodor III has left Russia with a crisis of succession. Supported by Prince Ivan Khovansky, Fyodor's sickly brother Ivan, who is 16, and his half-brother Peter, who is only 10, have been installed as joint rulers, with their older sister Sofia acting as regent. Sofia has allied herself with Prince Vasily Golitsin, a powerful courtier and liberal politician, who is also her alleged lover.

Due to regulations applicable at the time of the composition of the opera in Imperial Russia, it was forbidden to portray members of the Romanov dynasty on stage, so Mussorgsky had recourse to a series of symbols and indirect mention of main characters in the plot. Sofia, Ivan and Peter never actually appear on stage.

The principal theme of Khovanshchina is stated outright in the choral number "Akh, ty Rodnaya, Matushka Rus'" in act 1 ("Woe to thee, native, Mother Russia"), which laments that Russia is bleeding and dying not because of a foreign enemy, but because of fragmentation within. Something like a three-way civil war is in progress, which basically compresses twelve years of Russian history into one telling. The Tsarist court is modernizing, and two powerful forces are resisting these changes: the Streltsy and the Old Believers. The Streltsy are decommissioned elite soldiers/guards ("Streltsy" literally means "shooters", just like "musketeers"), past their prime and on indefinite furlough. They are fanatically loyal to Prince Ivan Khovansky. The Old Believers are Russian Orthodox Christians who have left the state-sponsored church because they disagree with the Patriarch Nikon's reforms; they also challenge the line of succession to the throne and have refused to recognize the Russian Patriarch. Their leader is Dosifey. Fortunately for Czar Peter, these two factions despise each other, as the Streltsy are rowdy degenerates and the Old Believers are pious ascetics. Each of the three principal basses in the opera believes himself to represent the "true" Russia against her internal enemies: Prince Ivan Khovansky claims legitimacy by noble birth and military prowess, Dosifey by religion, and Shaklovity by supporting Czar Peter.

== Synopsis ==
Time: The year 1682
Place: Moscow

In some performances and recordings of the opera some segments are deleted, depending on the interpretation of the original notes, which are described in [brackets].

=== Act 1 ===
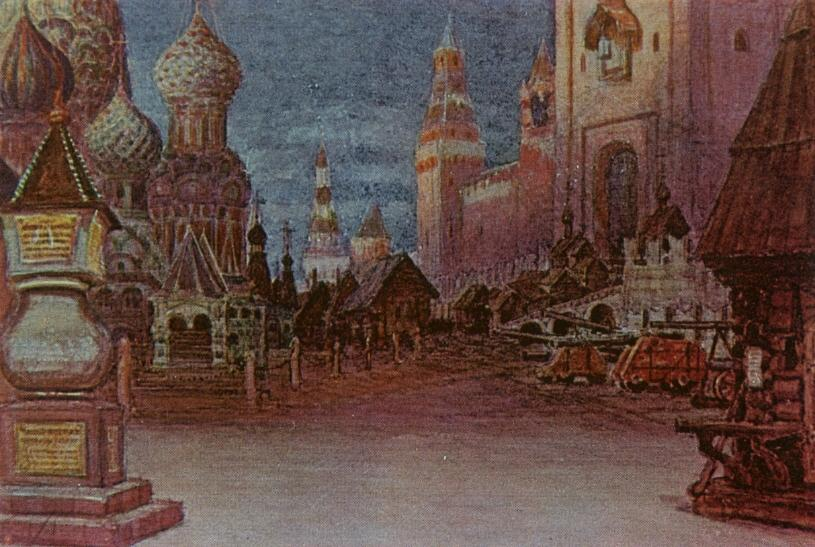
Scene design by Apollinariy Vasnetsov (Russian Private Opera, Moscow, 1897)

Moscow, Red Square

In the morning in the Red Square, a member of the Streltsy (named Kuzka) sings his drunkenness off while two other Streltsy talk about their rowdy activities the night before. A scribe arrives; they all pick on him and then leave. Shaklovity, a Boyar and agent for the regent and the Tsars, enters and dictates a letter to the court, warning of a rebellion planned by Prince Ivan Khovansky (captain of the Streltsy Guards) and the Old Believers. After finishing the letter he warns the scribe not to repeat what he heard. The scribe, terrified by the prospect of being involved in a political intrigue, signs the letter with a false name. [The crowd enters and they force the scribe to read a new proclamation that has been published in the public square, which describes the atrocities committed by the Streltsy. The crowd laments the state of Russia.] Prince Ivan Khovansky enters promising an adoring crowd that he will defend the "young Tsars" (Ivan V and Peter I). He and the crowd exit.

Prince Andrey, Khovansky's son, chases in Emma, a Lutheran German girl, intending to assault her. Marfa, an Old Believer and Andrey's former fiancée, interferes. Andrey threatens to kill Marfa, but Prince Ivan returns and decides to capture Emma himself. The ensuing quarrel between father and son is interrupted by the arrival of Dosifey, the leader of the Old Believers. Dosifey berates everyone for being so quarrelsome and un-Christian, and asks them all to join the Old Believers in reuniting Russia. Prince Ivan Khovansky leaves with Prince Andrey Khovansky. Marfa leaves with Emma. Dosifey, left alone, prays for the future of Russia.

=== Act 2 ===
Summer study of Prince Vasily Golitsin

Golitsin, a nervous progressive nobleman, reads letters from his lover [and his mother, who warns him to keep himself pure]. [A German Lutheran pastor enters to complain of the murder of one of the scribes in his community by the Streltsy and Prince Andrey Khovansky's pursuit of Emma. Prince Golitsin tries to appease the pastor and offers some form of political advantage that the pastor promises to collect later, although Golitsin flatly refuses to let him build another church; then the Prince wonders about the true motives behind the pastor's actions]. The Prince hires Marfa to tell his fortune in secret. She predicts that he will fall from power and face exile; he dismisses her and orders his servant to kill her. Once alone he ponders on all the acts that he has made to advance Russia, but is interrupted when Prince Ivan Khovansky enters without being announced. (Ivan is ironically disrespecting Golitsin, who himself reformed the tradition of announcing noble visitors.) Prince Khovansky complains that Golitsin has been interfering with his friends in the nobility and diminishing the privileges of nobility, and states that only Tartars believe that all men are equal, and questions whether Russia shall become "tartarized". A quarrel ensues, [each making insulting remarks about the other's military campaigns,] but Dosifey enters and draws their attention away from their argument by criticising both of them: Golitsin for his modern views, and Prince Ivan for letting the Streltsy get drunk and run around making trouble all the time. [In the discussion with Dosifey it turns out that he was once Prince Myshetsky who renounced all worldly matters, to which Prince Ivan Khovansky says that a Prince must die a Prince.] Marfa comes back, there has been an attempt on her life but she was saved by the Petrovtsy (the Tsar's personal army). After her enters Shaklovity, who menacingly announces that the Tsar has been warned of the planned rebellion and has issued orders to arrest the Princes Khovansky. Without resolving the drama, the act ends.

=== Act 3 ===
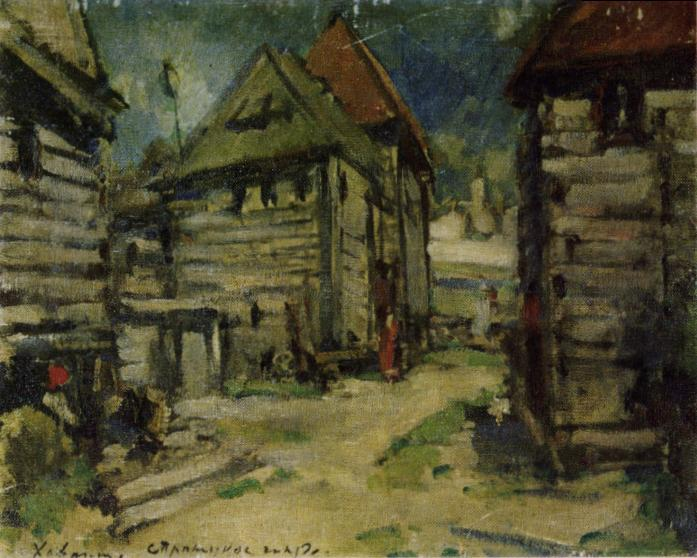
Scene design by Konstantin Korovin (Mariinsky Theatre, St. Petersburg, 1911)

The Streltsy Quarter, south of the Moscow River

As Old Believers chant a hymn for the future of Russia, Marfa sings of her lost love for Prince Andrey Khovansky. [Susanna, a fellow Old Believer, scolds Marfa until Dosifey appears and drives Susanna away.] Marfa admits to Dosifey that she still loves Prince Andrey Khovansky. Dosifey tells her to pray for relief. They exit and Shaklovity, who until now had been presented as a purely threatening character, sings a haunting prayer for troubled Russia's protection from the Streltsy (he refers to them as "mercenaries") and from the rebellious powers they obey. Hearing them coming he exits; some of the Streltsy enter and sing a drinking chorus followed by their wives who scold them about their drinking. [The soldiers ask Kuzka to help them with their wives; he ends up organizing an entire celebration with all the Streltsy and their women.] The scribe arrives and informs them that Tsar Peter's troops have initiated an attack on Streltsy-Russian soldiers. The Streltsy call their leader, Prince Ivan Khovansky, who enters and begs their forgiveness for declining to lead them into retaliation; the new Tsar is very powerful, he explains, and their time of power is over.

=== Act 4 ===
Scene 1: A richly furnished chamber in Prince Ivan Khovansky's palace

Prince Ivan Khovansky is being entertained by the women in his retinue but they are interrupted by a servant of Golitsin (Varsonofyev) who has come to warn him that he is in danger. Prince Ivan Khovansky ignores the warning and has the messenger flogged. He orders his Persian slaves to dance for him. Shaklovity enters and stabs Khovansky to death. Shaklovity scornfully imitates the servants' song over the Prince's corpse.

Scene 2: Moscow. The square before the Cathedral of Vasiliy the Blessed

Prince Golitsin is led into exile. Dosifey mourns the conspirators' downfall and the success of Tsar Peter and learns that the Imperial Council has decreed that the Old Believers are next. He discusses with Marfa that an everlasting example must be set by the Old Believers and agree that they shall immolate themselves. Prince Andrey Khovansky enters and confronts Marfa about where she hid Emma, but Marfa tells him that she is safely on her way back to Germany, her father and fiancé. Prince Andrey Khovansky threatens that he will have her burnt as a witch and calls for the Streltsy with his horn but instead a menacing sound is heard. Marfa offers sanctuary to Prince Andrey Khovansky with the Old Believers after she tells him of his father's murder. The Streltsy are led to their execution. Tsar Peter, through an agent, intervenes to pardon them.

=== Act 5 ===
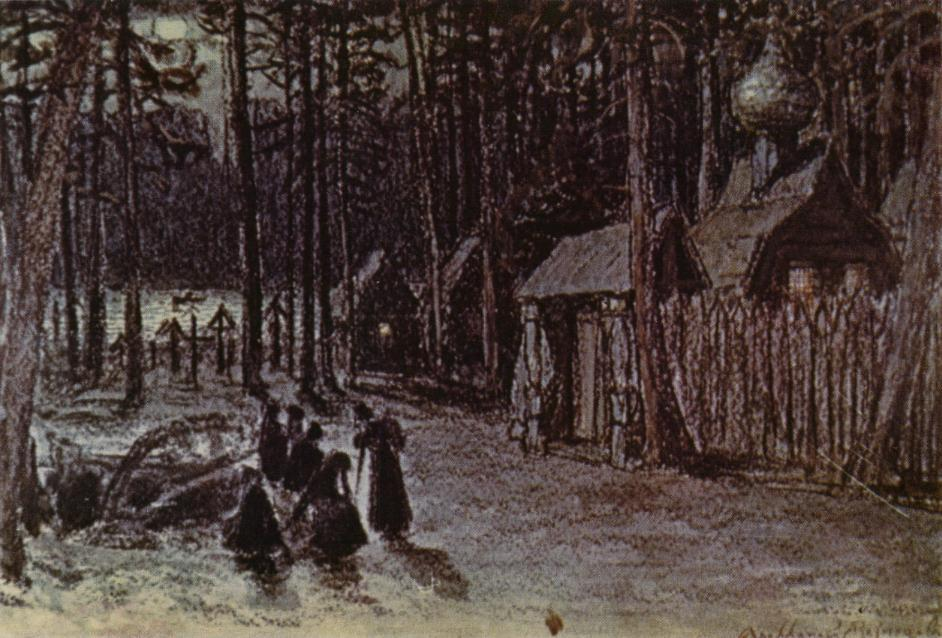
Scene design by Apollinariy Vasnetsov (Russian Private Opera, Moscow, 1897)

A pine forest, a secluded monastery, a moonlit night

Dosifey and his followers have taken refuge in a hermitage in the forest. Although he is weighed down by the sorrows and sufferings of the brethren, he remains defiant and determined to win a "crown of glory" in fire and flame ("Here, in this holy place"). He exhorts the brethren to don white clothing and light candles, preparing for immolation. They enter the hermitage. Prince Andrey Khovansky enters, singing of his lost love, still seeking Emma. Marfa sings to him, reminding him of their own love, and assuring him that she will not leave him. Dosifey and the brethren return, dressed in white and carrying candles. They build a funeral pyre. Offstage trumpet calls herald the approach of Tsar Peter's soldiers. Marfa sings to Andrey of the hopelessness of their situation. The trumpet calls sound again. Dosifey exhorts the brethren to remain strong one last time. Marfa lights the pyre. The schismatics sing a final hymn ("God will save me") as Dosifey, Marfa, Prince Andrey Khovansky and the Old Believers perish in the flames. [Tsar Peter's Preobrazhensky soldiers arrive in a vain attempt to capture them.] [Shostakovich version only: As the flames die away, the moon rises over the forest and the crowd from Moscow enters, reprising their act 1 lament for the state of Russia.]

Mussorgsky's original vocal score remained unfinished. The final portion of the libretto must be reconstructed from Mussorgsky's themes. The Rimsky-Korsakov edition (1883) adds to the final hymn figures representing flames, trumpet fanfares, and a final reprise of the "March of the Preobrazhensky Regiment" that concludes act 4. The Stravinsky version of the finale (1913) follows Mussorgsky's notes more closely in that the ending fades away. The Shostakovich version attempts to provide a musical conclusion of the opera by bringing back the theme of the sunrise from the Prelude to the opera.

== Principal arias and numbers ==
- Scene 1 – Red Square
  - Introduction: "Dawn on the Moscow River", Вступление: «Рассвет на Москве-реке» (Orchestra)
  - Chorus: "Make a wide path for the White Swan", «Белому лебедю путь просторен» (Streltsï, People)
  - Chorus: "Glory to the White Swan", «Слава лебедю» (People)
- Scene 2 – Golitsïn's Study
  - Aria: Marfa's Divination "Mysterious powers", Гадания Марфы «Силы потайные» (Marfa, Golitsïn)
- Scene 3 – Streltsï Quarter
  - Song: "A maiden wandered", «Исходила младёшенька» (Marfa)
  - Aria: "The Streltsy nest sleeps", «Спит стрелецкое гнездо» (Shaklovitïy)
- Scene 4 – Khovansky's Palace
  - Ballet: "Dance of the Persian Slaves", «Пляски персидок» (Orchestra)
  - Chorus: "A young swan swims", «Плывет, плывет лебедушка» (Maidens, Shaklovitïy, Ivan Khovansky)
- Scene 5 – Red Square
  - Introduction "The Departure of Golitsïn", Вступление «Поезд Голицына» (Orchestra, Chorus)
- Chorus: "Show them no mercy", «Не дай пощады» (Streltsï Wives, Streltsï, Andrey Khovansky, Marfa)
  - March: "March of the Preobrazhensky Regiment", «Марш преображенцев» (Orchestra)
- Scene 6 – Hermitage
  - Aria: "Here, in this holy place", «Здесь, на этом месте» (Dosifey)

== Recordings ==
Year	Cast: (Ivan Khovansky, Andrey Khovansky, Vasiliy Golitsïn, Shaklovitïy, Dosifey, Marfa)	Conductor and Orchestra	Version	Label
1946	Boris Freidkov, Ivan Nechayev, Vladimir Ulyanov, Ivan Chachkov, Mark Reizen, Sofiya Preobrazhenskaya	Boris Khaikin; Kirov Orchestra and Chorus	Rimsky-Korsakov 1882	LP: Melodiya, Cat: D 011 089/94; CD: Naxos, Cat: 8.111124-26
1951	Alexei Krivchenya, Aleksey Bolshakov, Nikandr Khanayev, Alexei Ivanov, Mark Reizen, Mariya Maksakova	Vassili Nebolsin; Bolshoi Theatre Orchestra and Chorus	Rimsky-Korsakov 1882	Melodiya; Cat: D 1712–19; Dante; Cat: LYS 504–506
1954	Nikola Cvejić, Aleksandar Marinković, Drago Starc, Dušan Popović, Miroslav Čangalović, Mila Bugarinović	Krešimir Baranović; Belgrade National Opera Orchestra and Chorus	Rimsky-Korsakov 1882	Decca; Cat: LXT 5045–5048
1971	Dimitar Petkov, Ljubomir Bodurov, Lyuben Mikhailov, Stoyan Popov, Nicolai Ghiuselev, Alexandrina Miltcheva	Atanas Margaritov; Sofia National Opera; Svetoslav Obretenov Chorus	Rimsky-Korsakov 1882	Balkanton; Cat: BOA 1439–42; Capriccio; Cat: 10 789–91
1973	Alexei Krivchenya, Vladislav Pyavko, Aleksey Maslennikov, Viktor Nechipailo, Alexander Ognivtsev, Irina Arkhipova	Boris Khaikin; Bolshoi Theatre Orchestra and Chorus	Rimsky-Korsakov 1882	Melodiya; Cat: C 10 05109–16; Le Chant du Monde; Cat: LDC 278 1024–1026
1979	Alexander Vedernikov, Georgi Andruschenko, Vladislav Romanovsky, Yevgeny Nesterenko, Irina Arkhipova	Yuri Simonov Bolshoi Theatre Orchestra and Chorus	Rimsky-Korsakov 1882	DVD (Video) Kultur (2005) Pioneer LD PA 90-016 (NTSC)
1986	Nicolai Ghiaurov, Zdravko Gadjev, Kaludi Kaludov, Stoyan Popov, Nicola Ghiuselev, Alexandrina Miltcheva	Emil Tchakarov; Sofia National Opera Orchestra and Chorus	Shostakovich 1959	Sony; Cat: S3K 45831
1988	Artur Eizen, Vladimir Shcherbakov, Yevgeny Raikov, Yuri Grigoriev, Yevgeny Nesterenko, Elena Obraztsova	Mark Ermler; Bolshoy Theater Orchestra and Chorus	Rimsky-Korsakov 1882	Melodiya; Cat: A10 00445 006
1989	Aage Haugland, Vladimir Atlantov, Vladimir Popov, Anatoly Kotcherga, Paata Burchuladze, Marjana Lipovšek	Claudio Abbado; Orchestra of the Vienna Staatsoper; Slovak Philharmonic Choir; Wiener Sängerknaben (Recording made at performances at the Vienna State Opera, September)	Shostakovich 1959 (final chorus by Stravinsky 1913)	CD: Deutsche Grammophon, Cat:429 758–2
1989	Nicolai Ghiaurov, Vladimir Atlantov, Yuri Marusin, Anatoly Kotcherga, Paata Burchuladze, Lyudmila Shemchuk	Claudio Abbado; Orchestra of the Vienna Staatsoper; Slovak Philharmonic Choir; Wiener Sängerknaben	Shostakovich 1959 (final chorus by Stravinsky 1913)	DVD (Video) Image Entertainment (2001) Stage director: Alfred Kirchner Video director: Brian Large
1991	Bulat Minjelkiev, Vladimir Galouzine, Alexei Steblianko, Valery Alexeev, Nikolay Okhotnikov, Olga Borodina	Valeriy Gergiev; Kirov Orchestra and Chorus	Shostakovich 1959 (without his additions to acts 2 and 5)	CD: Philips, Cat: 432 147–2; DVD: Immortal, Cat: IMM 950014
2007	Paata Burchuladze, Klaus Florian Vogt, John Daszak, Valery Alexeev, Anatoly Kotcherga, Doris Soffel	Kent Nagano; Bayerisches Staatsorchester; Chor der Bayerischen Staatsoper	Shostakovich 1959 (final chorus by Stravinsky 1913)	BD and DVD (Video) EuroArts (2009) Stage director: Dmitri Tcherniakov
