= Emil Tchakarov =

Bulgarian conductor (1948–1991)

Emil Tchakarov (Bulgarian: Емил Чакъров; 29 June 1948 – 4 August 1991) was a Bulgarian conductor active in both the concert hall and the opera house. He was associated with Herbert von Karajan early in his career, served as chief conductor of the Plovdiv Philharmonic Orchestra and the Royal Flemish Philharmonic, and conducted at major opera houses and concert venues in Europe and North America.

He founded the Sofia Festival Orchestra in 1986 and recorded a series of Russian operas for CBS Records and Sony Classical with Bulgarian and international singers. His name is associated with the Burgas Music Festival "Emil Tchakarov", organized by the State Opera – Burgas.

== Early life and education ==
Tchakarov was born in Burgas, Bulgaria, on 29 June 1948. He began violin lessons at the age of six and later entered the Sofia High School of Music, where he studied violin. From 1967 to 1971 he studied at the Sofia State Conservatoire, where he also conducted the student orchestra.

According to the Bulgarian National Radio Archives, Tchakarov showed an early interest in conducting and, while still very young, regarded conducting as his principal artistic vocation.

== Career ==
=== Karajan competition and early international activity ===
In 1971 Tchakarov won third prize at the second International Herbert von Karajan Conducting Competition in Berlin. He subsequently worked as an assistant to Herbert von Karajan in Berlin and Salzburg and continued his conducting studies in Hilversum and at the Tanglewood Music Center.

The association with Karajan was decisive for the beginning of his international career. Bulgarian National Radio later described him as one of Karajan's most gifted Bulgarian pupils and emphasized the importance of this period for his development as an opera and symphonic conductor.

=== Plovdiv and European appointments ===
From 1974 to 1978 Tchakarov was chief conductor of the Plovdiv Philharmonic Orchestra. During the following years he appeared with a number of European orchestras and became known for performances of both symphonic and operatic repertoire.

Between 1983 and 1986 he was chief conductor of the Royal Flemish Philharmonic in Antwerp. During this period the orchestra was reorganized under the name De Filharmonie van Vlaanderen, and Tchakarov was associated with its renewed professional profile.

In the 1989–1990 season he became guest conductor of the Leningrad Philharmonic Orchestra, with which he made several recordings and concert tours.

=== Opera career ===
Tchakarov made his Metropolitan Opera debut on 27 September 1979, conducting Tchaikovsky's Eugene Onegin. He returned to the Met for The Barber of Seville in the 1982–1983 season and for Boris Godunov in 1990.

In 1979 he also conducted Eugene Onegin at the Royal Opera House, Covent Garden. Other operatic engagements included Simon Boccanegra in Nice in 1985, Tosca in Nice in 1987, Boris Godunov at Houston Grand Opera in 1986, and Aida at the opening of Houston Grand Opera's first season in the Wortham Center in 1987. In 1983 he conducted Tannhäuser at the Maggio Musicale Fiorentino.

He was also associated with productions at La Scala, San Carlo Theatre in Naples, La Fenice in Venice and other opera houses.

=== Sofia Festival Orchestra and recordings ===
In 1986 Tchakarov founded the Sofia Festival Orchestra with the support of prominent Bulgarian musicians. The orchestra became central to his late career and to his major recording projects. At the end of the 1980s, CBS Records and Sony Classical engaged him to record a cycle of Russian operas, including works by Modest Mussorgsky, Alexander Borodin, Mikhail Glinka and Pyotr Ilyich Tchaikovsky.

Among these recordings were Boris Godunov, Khovanshchina, Prince Igor, A Life for the Tsar, Eugene Onegin and The Queen of Spades. The recordings involved Bulgarian and international singers such as Nicolai Ghiaurov, Nicola Ghiuselev, Stefka Evstatieva, Alexandrina Milcheva, Anna Tomowa-Sintow, Kaludi Kaludov, Nicolai Gedda, Yuri Mazurok and others.

His recording of Borodin's Prince Igor with the Sofia Festival Orchestra won a Grand Prix du Disque in 1989.

=== New Year's Music Festival ===
Tchakarov was also connected with the creation of a New Year's Music Festival in Sofia, which brought major international musicians and orchestras to Bulgaria during the late socialist period. Bulgarian National Radio later described this project as part of his wider ambition to connect Bulgarian musical life with leading international performers and institutions.

== Style and repertoire ==
Tchakarov's repertoire included the major symphonic, operatic and choral-orchestral works of the 19th and 20th centuries. He was particularly associated with Russian opera and with large-scale Romantic and late-Romantic repertoire. Bulgarian National Radio characterized his work as marked by energy, precision, dramatic intensity and a strong theatrical sense.

His concert activity included performances with orchestras such as the Berlin Philharmonic, Israel Philharmonic Orchestra, Boston Symphony Orchestra, London Symphony Orchestra, Orchestre National de France, Los Angeles Philharmonic, Czech Philharmonic and Leningrad Philharmonic.

== Final years and death ==
Tchakarov gave his last concert on 22 March 1991 with the Orchestre National de France in Paris. He died in Paris on 4 August 1991, at the age of 43.

== Legacy ==
Tchakarov's name is preserved in Bulgarian musical life through the Burgas Music Festival "Emil Tchakarov", organized by the State Opera – Burgas in partnership with the Municipality of Burgas. The festival is a major summer cultural event in Burgas and includes opera, ballet, symphonic concerts, popular music projects and productions for children.

The 2018 documentary film Last Concert by Georgi Toshev focused on Tchakarov's artistic path, international career and final years.

=== Emil Tchakarov Award ===
The Emil Tchakarov Award was established in 2011 and is presented during the Burgas Music Festival "Emil Tchakarov" to artists and cultural figures for contributions to music and the performing arts.

Recipients of the Emil Tchakarov Award
Year	Recipient
2011	Mincho Minchev
2012	Rumen Tsonev
2013	Alexander Tekeliev
2014	Nayden Todorov
2015	Dimitar Ivanov
2016	Georgi Spasov
2017	Dimitar Momchilov
2018	Kamen Chanev
2019	Grigor Palikarov
2020	Ivaylo Krinchev
2021	Not awarded
2022	Kiril Manolov
2023	Mario Nikolov
2024	Edelina Kaneva
2025	Kostadin Andreev

== Selected discography ==
- Ludwig van Beethoven: Violin Concerto in C, WoO 5, fragment; Romance No. 1 in G major, Op. 40; Gidon Kremer, violin; London Symphony Orchestra. Deutsche Grammophon, recorded 1978.
- Alexander Borodin: Prince Igor; Boris Martinovich, Stefka Evstatieva, Kaludi Kaludov, Nicola Ghiuselev, Nicolai Ghiaurov, Alexandrina Milcheva; Sofia Festival Orchestra. Grand Prix du Disque, 1989.
- Anton Bruckner: Symphony No. 4; Leningrad Philharmonic Orchestra. Melodiya, recorded 1978.
- Mikhail Glinka: A Life for the Tsar; Boris Martinovich, Chris Merritt, Stefania Toczyska, Alexandrina Pendachanska; Sofia Festival Orchestra. Sony Classical.
- Felix Mendelssohn: Violin Concerto; Augustin Dumay, violin; London Symphony Orchestra. EMI France, recorded 1988.
- Modest Mussorgsky: Boris Godunov; Nicolai Ghiaurov, Michail Svetlev, Josef Frank, Stefka Mineva, Nicola Ghiuselev; Sofia Festival Orchestra. Recorded 1986.
- Modest Mussorgsky: Khovanshchina; Nicolai Ghiaurov, Alexandrina Milcheva, Zdravko Gadjev, Nicola Ghiuselev, Kaludi Kaludov; Sofia Festival Orchestra. Recorded 1986.
- Franz Schubert: Concertstück in D major, D 345; Rondo in A major, D 438; Polonaise in B-flat major, D 580; Gidon Kremer, violin; London Symphony Orchestra. Deutsche Grammophon, recorded 1978.
- Richard Strauss: Also sprach Zarathustra; Orchestra Simfonică a Radioteleviziunii Române. Live recording from the 1981 George Enescu Festival in Bucharest. Electrecord.
- Pyotr Ilyich Tchaikovsky: The Queen of Spades; Wiesław Ochman, Stefka Evstatieva, Penka Dilova, Ivan Konsulov, Yuri Mazurok; Sofia Festival Orchestra. Sony, recorded 1988.
- Pyotr Ilyich Tchaikovsky: Eugene Onegin; Yuri Mazurok, Anna Tomowa-Sintow, Nicolai Gedda, Rossitsa Troeva-Mircheva; Sofia Festival Orchestra. Sony, 1988.
- Pyotr Ilyich Tchaikovsky: Violin Concerto; Augustin Dumay, violin; London Symphony Orchestra. EMI France, recorded 1988.
- Treasures of the Baroque Era; works by Albinoni/Giazotto, Johann Sebastian Bach, Luigi Boccherini, George Frideric Handel, Jean-Philippe Rameau, Giuseppe Torelli, Benedetto Marcello and Antonio Vivaldi; National Iranian Radio and Television Chamber Orchestra. EMI, recorded 1978 in Tehran.

== Film ==
Tchakarov was the conductor for Maurice Béjart's 1981 television film Six personnages en quête d'un chanteur, starring Ruggero Raimondi.
