= Attack on Narva (1657) =

Russian attack on Narva

- Part of the Russo-Swedish War (1656–1658)
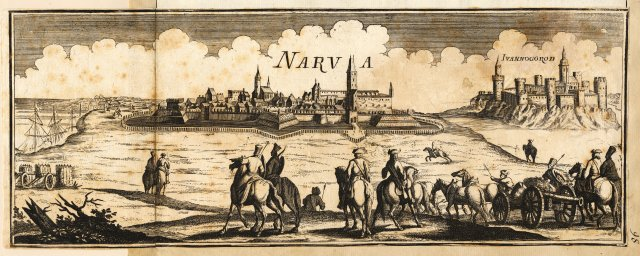
- Depiction of Narva by Johann Christoph Brotze from Sammlung verschiedner Liefländischer Monumente
Date	5–7 October, 1657
Location	Narva
Result	Swedish victory
Territorial changes	Russian forces withdraw to Jama

Belligerents
(yes) Swedish Empire	Tsardom of Russia

Commanders and leaders
Unknown	(Tsardom of Russia) Ivan Andreyevich Khovansky (Tsardom of Russia) Alexander Gamont (Tsardom of Russia) Venedikt Zmeyev

Units involved
(Swedish Empire) Narva garrison	(Tsardom of Russia) Khovansky's Regiment (Tsardom of Russia) Denis von Visin's Regiment

Strength
Unknown	Unknown, large

Casualties and losses
Unknown	Unknown

The attack on Narva occurred from 5 to 7 October, 1657, being fought between the garrison in Narva and a Russian force under Ivan Andreyevich Khovansky. The Swedish garrison managed to repel the Russian attack, and the Russians withdrew to Jama on 7 October, later withdrawing all the way to Pskov on 17 October.

== Background ==
Western Ingria had, under the autumn of 1657 and winter of 1658 been regularly raided by Russian forces. The Voivode in Pskov, Ivan Andreyevich Khovansky, received orders in December 1657 to continue the Russian offensives in Ingria, which worried the Swedes, but the Russians would not make any large expeditions.

== Attack ==
The Russian force, which was large, who had snuck around Magnus De la Gardie's forces in September and later raided Allentacken, arrived at Narva on 5 October. The original force consisted of around four companies of cavalry under Colonel Venedikt Zmeyev, two companies from Denis von Visin's Regiment, a sotnya of old-style cavalry, and four companies of dragoons under Alexander Gamont.

This force would later receive reinforcements in the form of Khovansky's Regiment, which also brought artillery with them. Christer Horn, the commander of Narva, had previously been unsuccessful in preventing the Russian advance. Aided by the Orthodox population in the city, who opened several access points in the Swedish defences, the Russians easily entered the town, which forced the Swedes to withdraw into the medieval Hermann Castle situated on the river. The chevaux-de-frise at Narva had been equipped with stakes, which, however, were broken in several places by the Russians. Despite this, the Swedes were able to repel the Russian storming attempt. After looting the town for three days and burning most of its buildings, the Russians departed

== Aftermath ==
On 7 October, the Russian troops withdrew from Narva, returning to Jama where they stayed for 3 days until withdrawing to Pskov, being followed by the approximately 350 Orthodox families who lived in Narva, or in total some 1,000 people.

== Works cited ==
- Fagerlund, Rainer (1979). Stade, Arne (ed.). Kriget på östfronten [The War on the Eastern Front] (in Swedish). Militärhistoriska förlaget. ISBN 9789185266098.
- Essen, Michael Fredholm von (2023). Charles X's Wars: Volume 3 - The Danish Wars, 1657-1660. Helion & Company. ISBN 9781915113603.
