= Anatoly Kocherga =

Ukrainian operatic bass (born 1947)

Anatoli Kotcherga
- Анатолій Кочерга
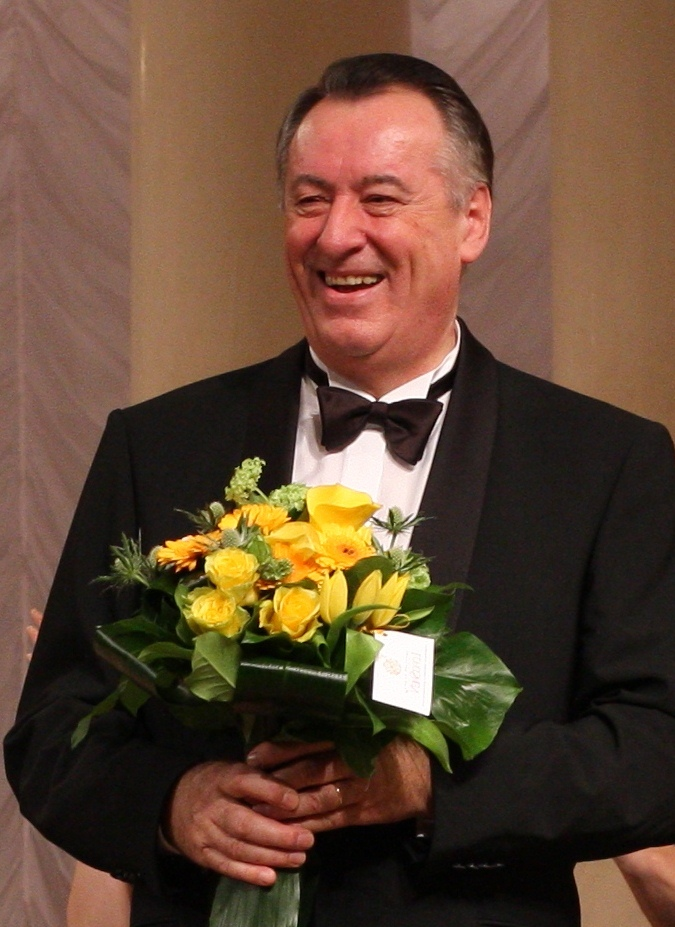
- Kotcherga in 2011
- Born: July 9, 1942 (age 84); Kiev, Ukraine
- Occupation: Musician

Anatoli Kotcherga (Ukrainian: Анатолій Іванович Кочерга; Born July 9, 1947), PAU, is a Ukrainian operatic bass.

He studied music at the Kiev Conservatory. In 1971, he won a prize in the Glinka Competition, and in 1974 he won the Tchaikovsky Competition. Shortly thereafter he was hired by the Kiev Opera. His international career was launched in 1989, when he sang Shaklovity in the Vienna Staatsoper's Khovanshchina, conducted by Claudio Abbado. He performed as Boris Godunov at the 1994 Salzburg Easter and Summer festivals, and he has been particularly associated with the part, singing it in Venice, Turin, Montpellier and with the Vienna Staatsoper in Japan. He also sang Dosifey. Other roles include the Commendatore, Sparafucile, Pistola, Banquo, and the Grand Inquisitor. Non-operatic work includes Mussorgsky's Songs and Dances of Death, Shostakovich's 13th Symphony and Janáček's Glagolitic Mass.

He can be seen on video as Shaklovity, Dosifey, Father Varlaam (in a video featuring Matti Salminen as Boris Godunov), and the Commendatore.
