= Streltsy uprising =

1698 rebellion in the Tsardom of Russia

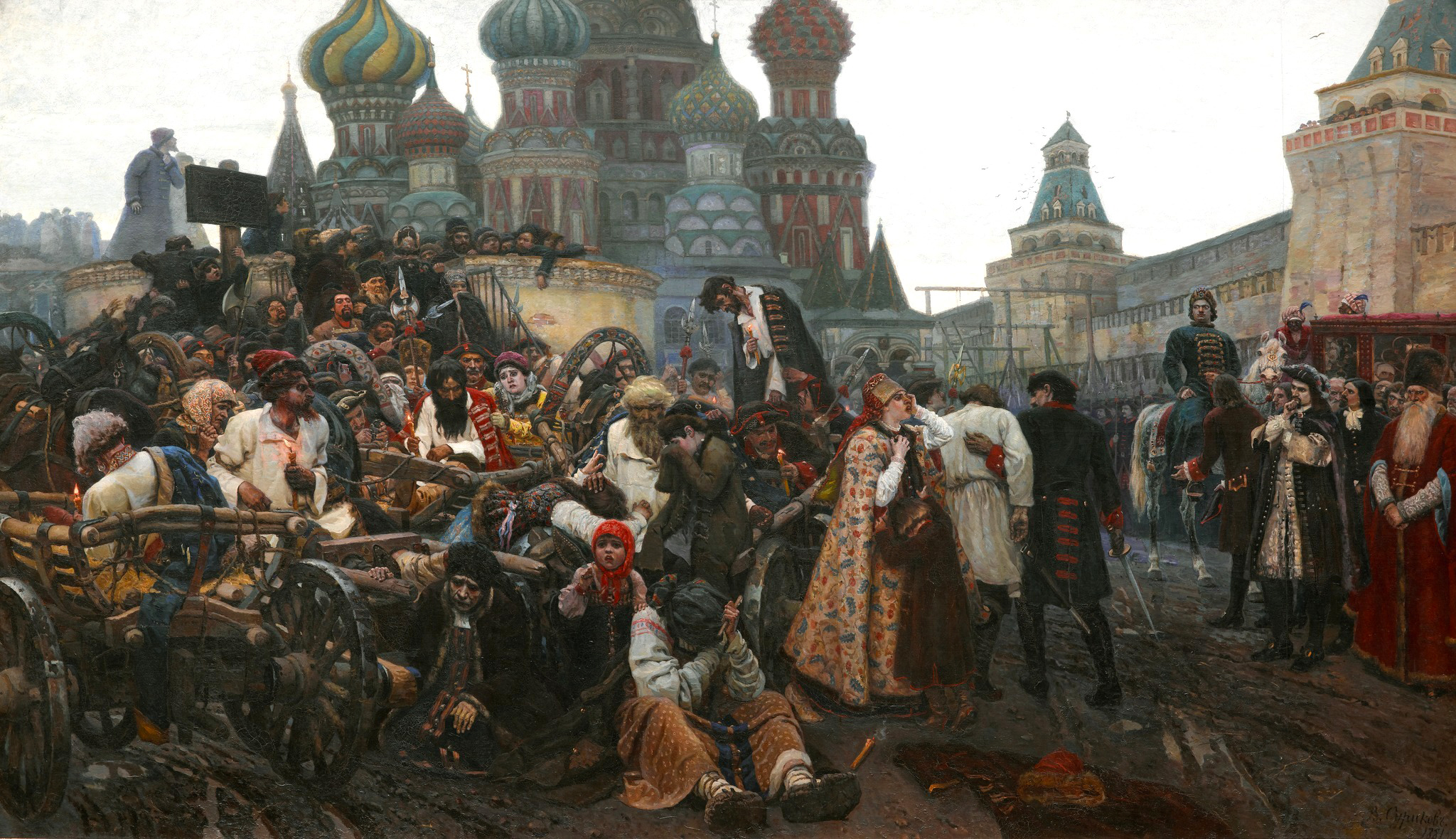
- The Morning of the Streltsy Execution, by Vasily Surikov, 1881
- Native name: Стрелецкий бунт
- Date: 1698
- Location: Tsardom of Russia
- Cause: Military-service hardships as one of the possible causes
- Outcome: Suppression of the uprising

The Streltsy uprising of 1698 (Russian: Стрелецкий бунт 1698 года) was an uprising of the Moscow Streltsy regiments.

== Background ==
Some Russian historians believe the uprising represented a reactionary rebellion against the progressive innovations of Peter the Great, who had left the country on a tour of cities in northern and western Europe at the time. Others see it as a riot against the yoke of serfdom oppression, military-service hardships and harassment.

The Moscow Streltsy, who had participated in Peter the Great's Azov campaigns (1695–1697), remained in Azov as a garrison. In 1697, however, the four regiments of Streltsy were unexpectedly sent to Velikiye Luki, instead of Moscow. On their way they suffered from lack of food and having to carry their equipment, due to lack of horses. In March 1698, 175 Streltsy left their regiments and fled to Moscow to file a complaint. They secretly established contact with Sophia Alekseyevna, who had been incarcerated at the Novodevichy Convent, and hoped for her mediation. The runaway Streltsy, despite their resistance, were sent back to their regiments, giving rise to discontent among the rest.

== Uprising ==
On 6 June, the Streltsy removed their commanding officers, chose four electives from each regiment, and made their way to Moscow, to punish the boyars and foreign advisers for their adversities. The rebels, about 2,300 men, intended to install Sophia or, in case of her refusal, her alleged lover Vasili Golitsyn, who had been in exile. Peter ordered four regiments (4,000 men) and a cavalry unit under the command of Aleksei Shein and Patrick Gordon to attack the Streltsy. On 18 June, the Streltsy were defeated not far from the New Jerusalem Monastery 40 km west of Moscow.

== Aftermath ==
Between 22 and 28 June 1698, 57 of the Streltsy uprising leaders were executed by hanging and the rest were sent into exile. Upon his hurried return from London on 25 August, Peter I ordered another investigation, and employed savage torture. Many suspects were whipped to death with the knout, a stout leather whip composed of twisted strands. Many were stretched until their limbs broke; sophisticated iron thumbscrews were applied to the fingers and toes of some prisoners; while others had their backs slowly roasted or had their flanks and bare feet slowly torn apart with red-hot iron pincers. Peter thus induced suspect after suspect to name accomplices in a cavalcade of forced, and perhaps sometimes false, confessions. Between September 1698 and February 1699, 1,182 Streltsy were executed and 601 whipped, branded with iron, or (mostly the young ones) sent into exile. The investigation and executions continued until 1707. The Moscow regiments, which had not participated in the uprising, were later disbanded. Streltsy and their family members were removed from Moscow.

== Bibliography ==
- Herd, Graeme P. "Modernizing the muscovite military: The systemic shock of 1698." Journal of Slavic Military Studies 14.4 (2001): 110–130.
- Moutchnik, Alexander: Der "Strelitzen-Aufstand" von 1698, in: Volksaufstände in Russland. Von der Zeit der Wirren bis zur "Grünen Revolution" gegen die Sowjetherrschaft, hrsg. von Heinz-Dietrich Löwe. Forschungen zur osteuropäischen Geschichte, Bd. 65, Harrassowitz Verlag, Wiesbaden, 2006, S. 163–196. ISBN 3-447-05292-9 (The Streltsy Uprising of 1698)
