= Melanija Bugarinović =

Serbian opera singer (1905–1986)

Melanija Bugarinović (Serbian Cyrillic: Меланија Бугариновић; 29 June 1905 – 8 May 1986) was a Serbian operatic mezzo-soprano. A prominent member of the Belgrade National Opera during the mid-twentienth century, Bugarinović is remembered for her rich, dark voice as well as being the first Serbian woman both to receive a permanent engagement with the Vienna State Opera and to perform at Germany's famous Bayreuth Festival.

== Early life and career ==
Born in Bela Crkva, Bugarinović began singing at the age of six in her church and school choir. She studied voice and piano in Timișoara and there gave birth to her daughter, Mirjana Kalinović-Kalin, who would also become an opera singer. After supporting herself by performing in local choirs and operetta productions, Bugarinović moved to Belgrade in 1930 and, a month later, secured a position with the Belgrade National Opera. Only a year after her engagement with the National Theatre, she graduated to leading roles with the part of Azucena from Giuseppe Verdi's Il trovatore.

In 1938, Bugarinović auditioned for both the Vienna and Berlin Operas, eventually choosing to relocate to Vienna. Remaining with the company until 1943, she performed in a variety of roles, such as the title role in Georges Bizet's Carmen, Amneris in Verdi's Aïda, and Erda in Richard Wagner's Das Rheingold and Siegfried. In 1942, she even sang Herodias in Richard Strauss's Salome, conducted by the composer himself.

After World War II, Bugarinović returned to Serbia to resume her position at the National Theatre. During this time, she also recorded five roles in Belgrade National Opera's cycle of seven Russian operas for Decca Records—Marina Mnishek (Modest Mussorgsky's Boris Godunov) and Marfa (Mussorgsky's Khovanshchina), both recorded in 1954; and, in 1955, Konchakovna (Alexander Borodin's Prince Igor), the Countess (Pyotr Ilyich Tchaikovsky's The Queen of Spades), and Filipjevna (Tchaikovsky's Eugene Onegin)—and the role of Vanya in Mikhail Glinka's A Life for the Tsar for EMI Records in 1957.

Bugarinović performed as a member of the ensemble in the 1952/53 season at the Bayreuth Festival. An extant recording exists of her assumption of Erda, Grimgerde, and the Second Norn from a 1952 performance of Wagner's Der Ring des Nibelungen under conductor Joseph Keilberth.

Having performed throughout Europe, as well as Israel, Egypt, and Russia, Bugarinović retired in 1968. She died in Belgrade in 1986.
