= Fyodor Shaklovity =

Russian diplomat

Fyodor Leontyevich Shaklovity (Russian: Фëдор Леонтьевич Шакловитый) (Bryansk - October 21 [O.S. October 11] 1689, Moscow) was a Russian diplomat best known as a staunch adherent of the regent Sophia Alekseyevna, who had promoted him from a regular scrivener to a member of the Boyar Duma and okolnichy. Fyodor Shaklovity was then appointed head of the Streltsy Department after the execution of Ivan Khovansky in the aftermath of the Moscow Uprising of 1682.

Fyodor Shaklovity is known to have been one of the foremost advisers of Sophia Alekseyevna in international affairs, along with Vasily Golitsyn. In 1688, he was sent to Malorossiya to seek participation of Hetman Mazepa's army in Russia's campaign against Turkey. Upon his return from this mission, Fyodor Shaklovity began to incite the Streltsy to come out against the young Peter Alexeyevich and Naryshkin family and demand Sophia Alekseyevna's coronation. His efforts turned out to be fruitless. Soon, Fyodor Shaklovity and his Streltsy accomplices were delivered to Peter Alexeyevich. After an official interrogation with the use of torture, Fyodor Shaklovity was executed on October 11, 1689. A vast criminal case against him was published in four volumes in 1887–1890.

Shaklovity appears as a morally ambivalent character in Modest Mussorgsky's opera Khovanshchina, sung as a bass-baritone.
