= Sophia Alekseyevna of Russia =

Russian tsarevna (1657–1704)

Sophia Alekseyevna
- Tsarevna of Russia
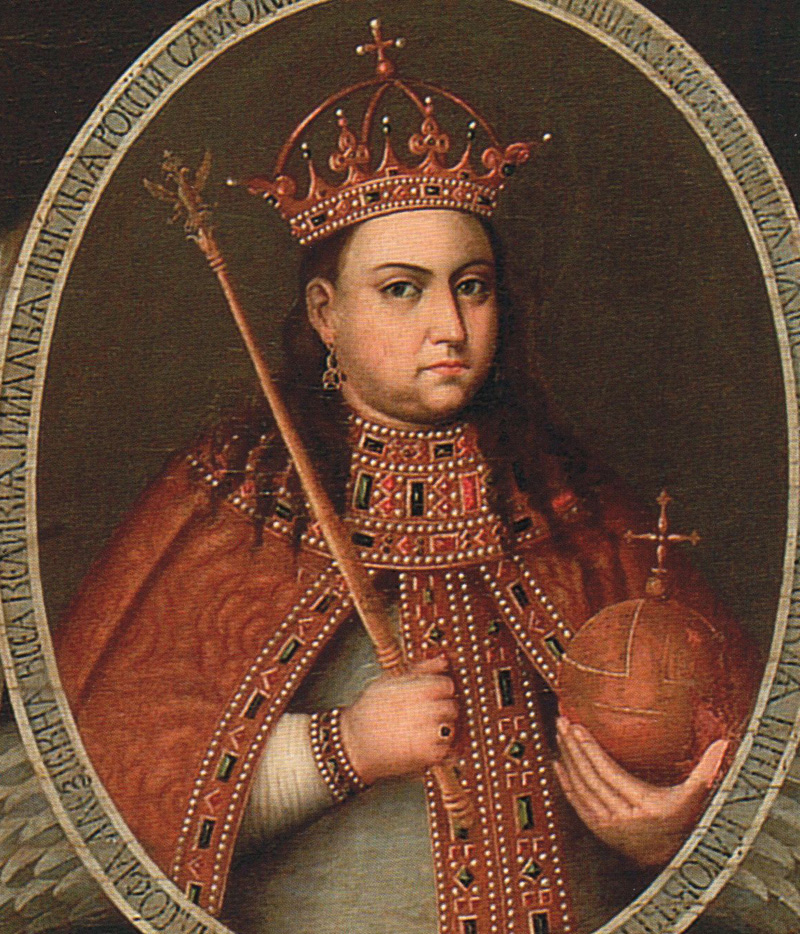
- Portrait, 1680s

Regent of Russia
- Regency: 8 June 1682 – 22 September 1689
- Monarchs: Peter I Ivan V
- Born: 27 September 1657; Moscow, Russia
- Died: 14 July 1704 (aged 46); Novodevichy Convent, Russia
- Burial: Archangel Cathedral
Names
- Sophia Alekseyevna Romanova
- House: Romanov
- Father: Alexis I
- Mother: Maria Miloslavskaya
- Religion: Eastern Orthodox

Sophia Alekseyevna (Russian: Со́фья Алексе́евна, IPA: [ˈsofʲjə ɐlʲɪˈksʲejɪvnə]; 27 September [O.S. 17 September] 1657 – 14 July [O.S. 3 July] 1704) was a Russian princess who ruled as regent of Russia from 1682 to 1689. She allied herself with a singularly capable courtier and politician, Prince Vasily Golitsyn, to install herself during the minority of her brother Ivan V and half-brother Peter I. She carried out her regency with a firm hand. The activity of this "bogatyr-tsarevna", as Sergey Solovyov called her, was all the more extraordinary, as upper-class Muscovite women were confined to the upper-floor terem, veiled and guarded in public, and invariably kept aloof from any open involvement in politics.

== Early life ==
Sophia was the third surviving daughter of Tsar Alexis by his first wife, Maria Miloslavskaya. She was the only one of her sisters educated by Simeon Polotsky, who also taught Tsar Alexis' heirs Tsarevich Alexei and Tsarevich Feodor. After the death of her brother Tsar Feodor III on 27 April 1682, Sophia unexpectedly entered Russian politics, trying to prevent her young half-brother, the 9-year old Peter Alekseyevich from bypassing his 16-year-old elder brother Tsarevich Ivan and inheriting the throne.

== Rise to regency ==
Although Sophia emerged from the shadows during the dynastic struggles of 1682, her prior influences can help to explain her ascendance to the regency. At the previous change of ruler in 1676, Sophia may have acted in the interest of her brother, Feodor, as various rumours exist of her pleading then with her father, the dying Tsar Alexis, not to proclaim Peter his heir. Feodor's capability to lead Russia was questioned, based on his weak nature and poor health. His mental ability developed quite nicely over time, as he was taught by Simeon Polotsky. During Feodor III's brief reign (1676–1682), many historians argue, Feodor actually "ruled under the protectorate of Sophia his sister".

As the young Tsar Feodor's health began to decline, more individuals rose up to counsel him, and Sophia found her influence steadily declining. Taking advantage of a court never open to a woman in her situation, she utilized her connections, making allies and formally planning on securing the throne. When Feodor died on 7 May [O.S. 27 April] 1682, Sophia immediately returned to the political scene. She attended her brother's funeral and caused a commotion while doing so. In Sophia's age, the female relatives of the tsar were kept away from the court and other political spheres, and funerals traditionally took place without women. Sophia stormed into the funeral, insisting on her presence and simultaneously setting off a chain of events that would result in her regency.

The Miloslavsky party, grouped around the family of Feodor and Sophia, took advantage of the Streltsy uprising 25 May [O.S. 15 May] 1682 to place Sophia on the seat of power. Tsar Alexis had left behind two families by his two wives, and each of the two branches had at least one male heir. As the clans of Alexis' two wives were in conflict, Sophia devised a plan to ensure power for herself and her family. Promoting the case of her full brother Ivan as the legitimate heir to the throne, Sophia attempted to convince the patriarch and the boyars that they should reverse their recent decision to crown Peter. Insisting that Peter's proclamation broke monarchic laws by skipping over her brother, who would have been next in line to rule if not for his ineptitude, she proposed a shared crown with Ivan and herself.

Upon the court's swift and unanimous rejection of this proposal, Sophia reached out to the discouraged military troop, the streltsy, for their aid and support. The unjust dismissal of Ivan's rights acted as a catalyst for the already displeased and frustrated troops. Multiple issues, including merciless motivational tactics and lack of rest, drove the streltsy to violent opposition against the "unjust" election of Peter. As the fighting ceased and Peter's life was left forever scarred by the blood spilt by his Naryshkin relatives, the streltsy achieved their initial demands.

In the aftermath of the streltsy rebellion, on 25 June 1682 the Patriarch Ioakim crowned the incompetent Ivan as senior tsar (Ivan V) and Peter, only nine years old, as junior tsar. Sophia had been deemed the sole intellectually mature member of the ruling family at the time of Feodor's death, making her the favourite to govern on behalf of the child Peter and of the inept Ivan. Using political and practical knowledge she had acquired by Feodor's side, Sophia convinced the nobles and the patriarch of her capacity to rule Russia. As Sophia had arranged before Tsar Feodor's death, Vasily Golitsyn was installed as de facto head of government, executing most of the policies during her regency.

== Romantic life ==
Sophia's relationship with Prince Golitsyn was not necessarily a romantic attachment. Golitsyn had a wife and a large family at a time when the boyars were still attached to the Domostroy, a matrimonial code from Ivan IV's reign. Several early 18th-century memoirs gave birth to rumours that Golitsyn had been Sophia's lover. Some see the evidence for this in the tone of Sophia's correspondence with him in 1689.

In any case, a romantic interaction between the two could not begin when they met under Feodor's rule. Feodor entrusted great confidence in Golitsyn, and there remains no evidence Sophia and Vasily acted against customs that would have kept them apart until after his death. There is no suspicion of any relations until the letter in 1689, even during the period of Golitsyn's rise to power.

== Regency ==
When the Old Believers joined the rebels in the fall of 1682 and demanded the reversal of Nikon's reforms, Sophia lost control of the unsteady Streltsy to her once ally, Prince Ivan Khovansky. After aiding Sophia in May, Khovansky used his influence with the troops to force her court to flee the Moscow Kremlin and seek refuge in the Troitse-Sergiyeva Lavra. The streltsy rebels, who instigated the rebellion, hoped to depose Sophia and to make Prince Ivan Khovansky a new regent, to satisfy their increasing desire for concessions. Calling together the gentry militia, Sophia suppressed the so-called Khovanshchina with the help of Fyodor Shaklovityi, who succeeded Khovansky in charge of the Muscovite army. Silencing the dissatisfied parties until Peter reached his age of majority, Sophia executed Khovansky and the other figureheads of the attempted rebellion.

During the seven years of her regency, Sophia made a few concessions to posads and loosened detention policies towards runaway peasants, which caused dissatisfaction among the nobles. She also made an effort to further the organization of the military. Intrigued by baroque-style architecture, Sophia held responsibility for the promotion of the foreign district, and the creation of the Slavonic-Greek-Latin Academy, the first Russian higher learning institution.

The most important highlights of her foreign policy, as engineered by Golitsyn, were the Eternal Peace Treaty of 1686 with Poland, the 1689 Treaty of Nerchinsk with China, and the Crimean campaigns against the Ottoman Empire. Although spearheaded by Prince Golitsyn, Sophia's reign oversaw two of the earliest diplomatic treaties and underwent inner growth and progress. Despite her other achievements, Sophia's influence and effect on a young Peter remains as the most historically significant portion of her reign, as the rebellion of 1682 bred a distrust in nobility that came to define his leadership.

== Downfall ==
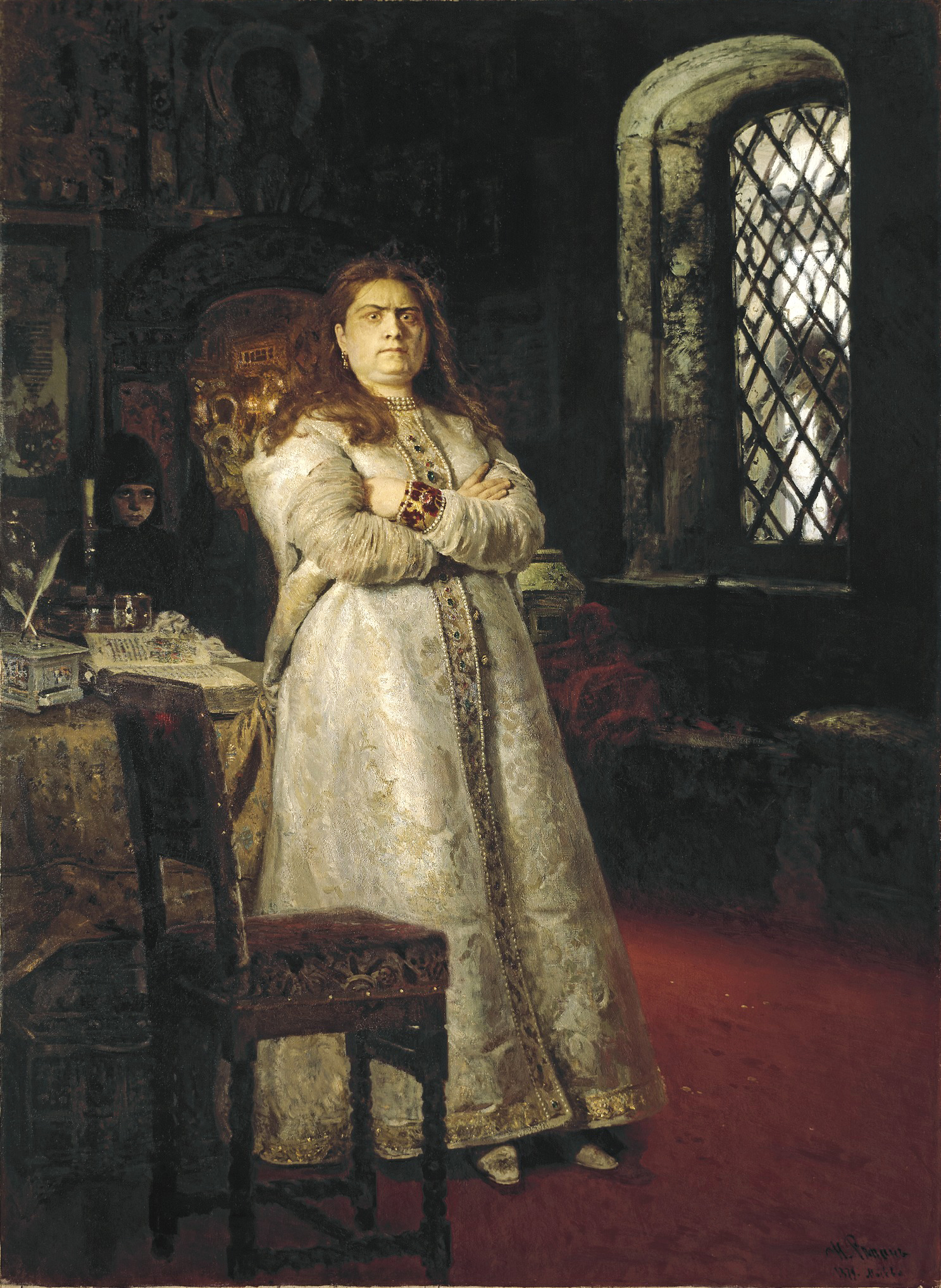
Ilya Repin's 1879 painting portrays Sophia after her fall from power, confined to a cell in the Novodevichy Convent. Also in the painting, outside the window, a hanging Strelets shows the fate of those who sought to reinstate her.

Sophia Alekseyevna's regency retained the trappings of a typical regent, and the true tsar was growing into his position with every passing year. At the age of 16, Peter I demanded that Golitsyn report to him regarding all matters, and the Naryshkin family prepared for their long-awaited ascension to power. In 1688, Peter began to promote within his clan, and Sophia remained powerless to halt the gradual shift in control. During this time period, the regent disregarded the young tsar, letting him train his Preobrazhensky and Semenovsky Guards in Preobrazhenskoe.

Although some historians claim Sophia made conscious attempts to neutralize Peter and remove him from the political world, her involvement remains unclear. Sophia and her party had discussed crowning her as tsarina, and in August 1687 had tried persuading the Streltsy to petition on her behalf. Denied their aid, Sophia and her supporters found themselves on the decline in 1688, as the Crimean campaigns brought rioting and unrest to Moscow. To worsen the situation, Peter married, readying himself for rule, and Ivan V fathered a girl, eliminating any potential claim to the throne from that branch.

Tensions between the two factions continued to grow, until Peter I turned 17 years of age, when his Naryshkin relatives demanded that Sophia step down. In response, Shaklovityi advised Sophia to proclaim herself tsarina and attempted to induce the Streltsy to a new uprising. Most of the Streltsy units deserted central Moscow for the suburb of Preobrazhenskoye and later for the Troitse-Sergiyeva Lavra, where the young tsar was living. Feeling the power slipping from her hands, Sophia sent the boyars and the Patriarch to Peter, asking him to join her in the Kremlin. He flatly refused her overtures, demanding Shaklovityi's execution and Golitsyn's exile.

After Sophia agreed to surrender her senior boyars, she was arrested and forced to withdraw to the Novodevichy Convent without formally taking the veil. Sophia may have made one last attempt at securing power, although her involvement is unclear. Regardless of her conscious intent, her fate was sealed ten years later, when the Streltsy attempted to reinstate her in the Kremlin during Peter's absence from the country. This uprising was suppressed with an iron hand, and soon the corpses of the rebels were suspended in front of Sophia's windows. Having taken the veil, she was kept in the strictest seclusion, with other nuns not allowed to see her except on Easter Sunday. She died in the Novodevichy Convent six years later.

== In popular culture ==
Sophia Alekseyevna appears as a minor character in the wuxia novel The Deer and the Cauldron by Jin Yong. In the novel, the protagonist Wei Xiaobao goes to Russia and helps her in the coup against her half-brother Peter I. This event led to the peace between China and Russia in the Nerchinsk Treaty.

Vanessa Redgrave portrayed the character of Sophia Alekseyevna in the 1986 miniseries Peter the Great. Her performance received an Emmy award nomination for Outstanding Supporting Actress in a Miniseries.
