= Moscow uprising of 1682 =

Uprising of Moscow Streltsy regiments

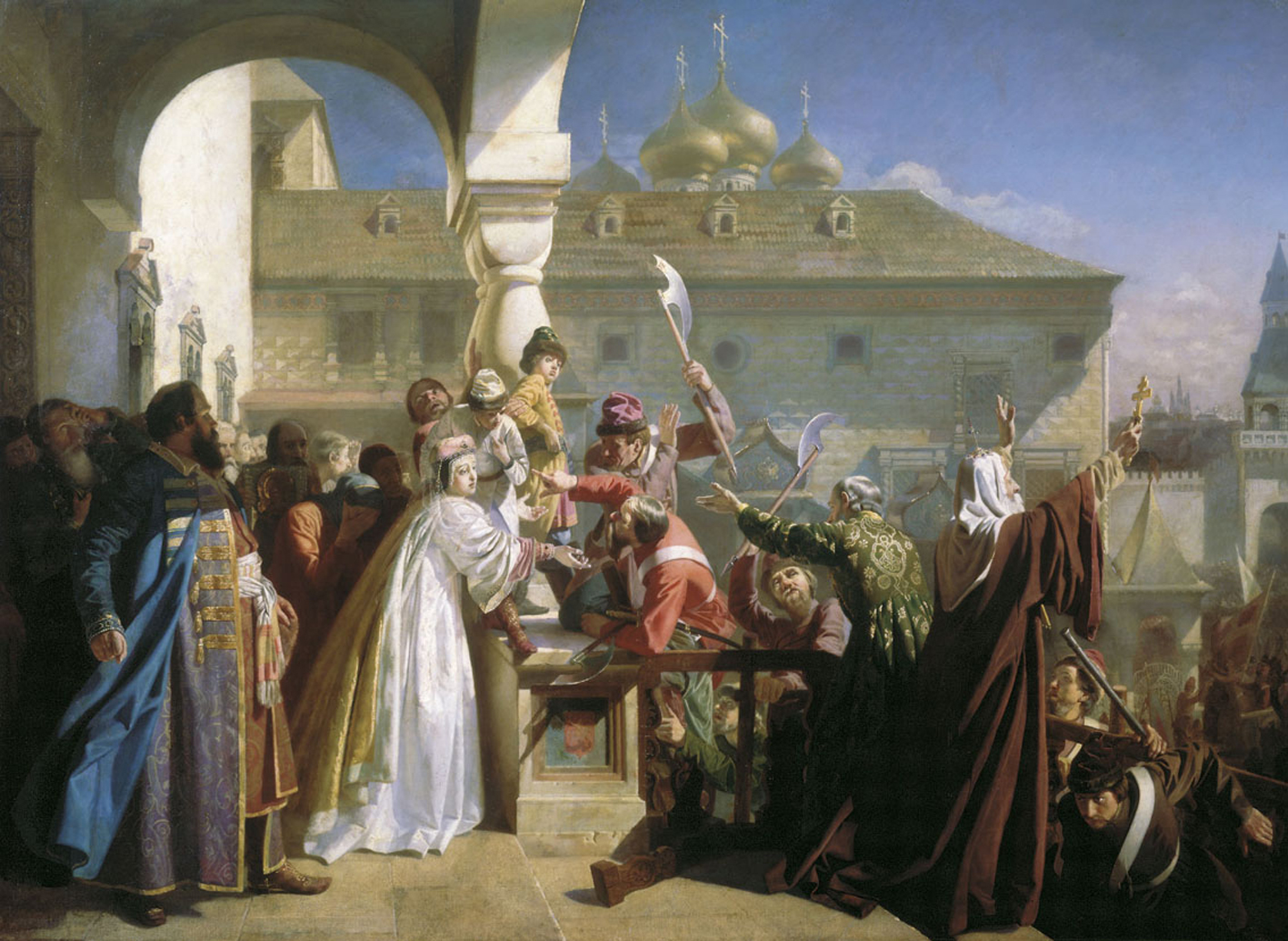
A scene from the uprising: Natalia Naryshkina shows Ivan V to the Streltsy in order to prove that he is alive and well, while Patriarch Joachim of Moscow attempts to calm the crowd.

The Moscow uprising of 1682, also known as the Streltsy uprising of 1682 (Russian: Стрелецкий бунт), was an uprising of the Moscow Streltsy regiments that resulted in supreme power devolving on Sophia Alekseyevna, the daughter of the late Tsar Aleksey Mikhailovich and of his first wife Maria Miloslavskaya. Behind the uprising lurked the rivalry between the Miloslavsky and Naryshkin relatives of the two wives of the late Tsar Aleksey, who died in 1676, for dominant influence on the administration of the Tsardom of Russia.

== Course of events ==
The death of Tsar Feodor III of Russia on 27 April (7 May N.S.) 1682 triggered the uprising. The Naryshkin brothers of Tsarina Natalia Naryshkina availed themselves of the interregnum and persuaded the Patriarch to proclaim her ten-year-old son Peter as the new Tsar of Russia. The Miloslavsky party, which comprised the relatives of the late Tsarina Maria Miloslavskaya, spread rumours that the Naryshkins had strangled Maria's son, Peter's elder half-brother Ivan and poisoned the former Tsar, Feodor, in the Moscow Kremlin.

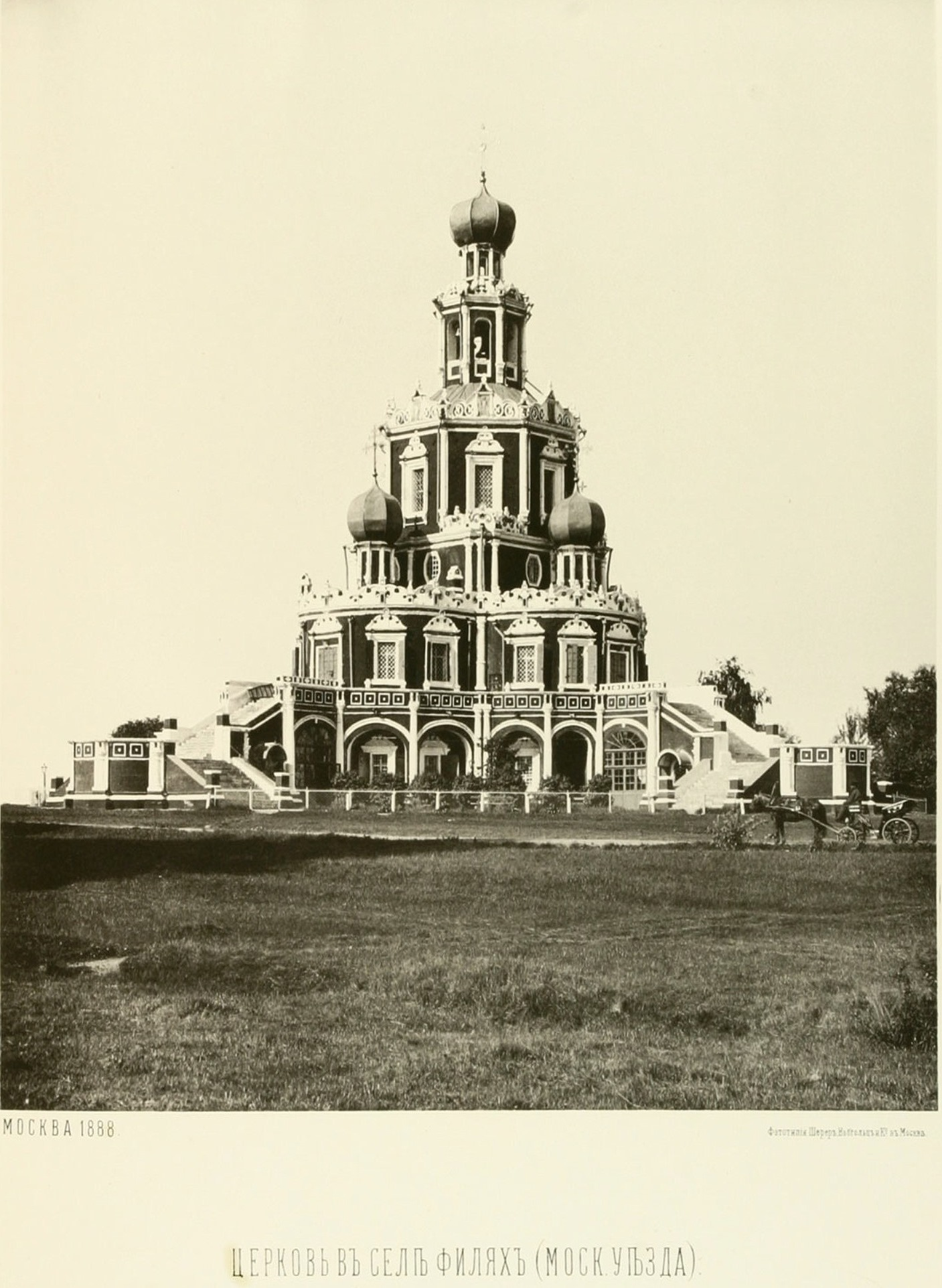
A votive church commissioned by the Naryshkins after the revolt

=== The initial uprising ===
The Miloslavsky conspirators stirred up riots in the streets of the capital. They exploited the discontent of the Moscow regiments against their commanding officers. On 11 May 1682 the mob of the Streltsy took over the Kremlin and lynched the leading boyars and military commanders, whom they suspected of corruption—Artamon Matveev, Mikhail Dolgorukov, and Grigory Romodanovsky.

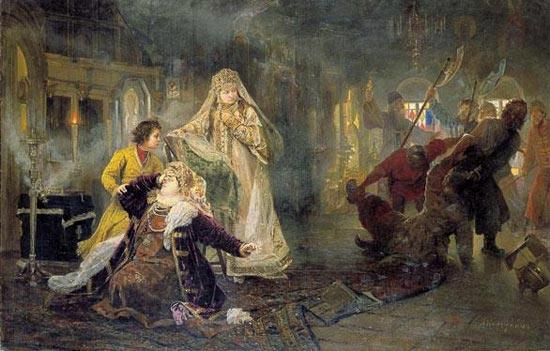
A scene from the uprising: The Streltsy take away Natalia Naryshkina's brother; young Peter I tries to console his mother, while Sophia watches the whole scene in satisfaction.

=== The Second Storming of the Kremlin ===
A few days later, on 17 May, the rebels again stormed the royal residence and killed a number of Naryshkin supporters, including two of the Naryshkin brothers, Kirill and Ivan, in the presence of the young tsar Peter, their nephew. Mobs of poor people joined with the Streltsy, and the streets of Moscow saw several days of looting. The May uprising led to the proclamation of Peter's older half-brother Ivan V as the "first" tsar and the relegation of the young Peter I to second position, with Sophia, Ivan's full sister and Peter's half sister, acting as a regent for them both.

=== The Khovansky Affair ===
In the autumn of 1682 Prince Ivan Andreyevich Khovansky (Tararui)—Sophia's close associate and one of the leaders of the rebellious Streltsy—turned against her. Supported by the Old Believers, Khovansky—who supposedly wanted to install himself as the new regent—demanded the reversal of Nikon's reforms. Sophia and her court had to flee the Moscow Kremlin and sought refuge in the Troitse-Sergiyeva Lavra. Eventually, Sophia managed to suppress the so-called Khovanshchina (Khovansky affair) with the help of Fyodor Shaklovity, who succeeded Khovansky in charge of the Muscovite army.

== See also ==
- Copper Riot
- Khovanshchina, an opera by Modest Mussorgsky based on the events of the uprising.
- Streltsy uprising
