= Mark Reizen =

Russian opera singer (1895–1992)

Mark Reizen

Mark Osipovich Reizen or Reyzen (Russian: Марк Осипович Рейзен, 3 July [O.S. 21 June] 1895 – 25 November 1992) was a Soviet and Russian operatic bass and pedagogue. He was awarded the title of People's Artist of the USSR (1937).

== Life and career ==
Reizen was born into a Jewish family of mine workers in 1895 in the village of Zaitsevo in Yekaterinoslav Governorate of the Russian Empire. He had four brothers and a sister, and all were trained in music, playing mandolin, guitar, balalaika and accordion. He served as a soldier in the Russian army during the First World War. He studied engineering at Kharkov Polytechnic, and also singing at the Kharkov Conservatory with the Italian professor Federico Bugamelli from 1919 to 1920. He debuted at the Kharkov Opera in 1921 as Pimen in Mussorgsky's Boris Godunov, and in 1925, he moved to the Mariinsky Theatre in Leningrad. Reizen toured Europe performing in Paris, Berlin, Monte Carlo and London from 1929 to 1930.

A tall man commanding a strong stage presence, he joined the Bolshoi Theatre in 1930, remaining there as a principal bass until his retirement in 1954. Among his roles were: Ivan Susanin and Ruslan in the two Glinka operas, Don Basilio in The Barber of Seville by Rossini, Mephistopheles in Faust by Gounod, Prince Gremin in Eugene Onegin by Tchaikovsky, Salieri in Mozart and Salieri and the Viking guest in Sadko by Rimsky-Korsakov, the old gypsy in Aleko by Rachmaninoff, Wotan in Wagner's Ring of the Nibelungs, Konchak in Prince Igor by Borodin, Philip II and Procida in Verdi's two French grand operas, and so on. He became a particularly memorable interpreter of Boris and Dosifey in the two greatest operas of Mussorgsky (Boris Godunov and Khovanshchina).

In 1967, he began teaching, and became a professor at Moscow's Gnessin Institute. He gave an important recital for his 80th birthday, and for his 90th sang Prince Gremin (in Eugene Onegin) at the Bolshoi in Moscow in July 1985. On both occasions, his voice sounded remarkably preserved.

Reizen died of a stroke in 1992 in Moscow at the age of 97. A number of his recordings are still available on CD, and film clips of his performances also exist.

== Awards and honors ==
- Honored Artist of the RSFSR (1933)
- People's Artist of the USSR (1937)
- Three Orders of Lenin (1937, 1951, 1976)
- Three Stalin Prizes first degree (1941, 1949, 1951)
- Order of the Red Banner of Labour (1955)
- Order of Friendship of Peoples (1985)

== Recordings and discography ==
- Lebendige Vergangenheit - Mark Reizen CD 0717281890595 Label: Preiser 1997, Time: 76 minutes (with biographical liner notes).
- "Mark Reizen - Mussorgsky, Rachmaninov, Tchaikovsky, Taneyev, Kabelevsky" AQVR 308-2 (Aquarius Classics)
- "Mark Reizen - Romances by Tchaikovsky AQVR 309-2 (Aquarius Classics)
- "Mark Reizen - Dargomyzhsky's Rusalka" AQVR 390-2 (Aquarius Classics)
- "Mark Reizen - Romances and songs " AQVR305-2 (Aquarius classics)
- "Mark Reizen in Rimsky-Korsakov's The Maid of Pskov AQVR 352-2 (Aquarius classics)
- Detailed discography: , .

== Bibliography ==
- Piotr Kaminski: article in Guide de L'Opera, Fayard, France, 1992, p. 690
- Steane, J B: "Reyzen, Mark" in The New Grove Dictionary of Opera, ed. Stanley Sadie (London, 1992) ISBN 0-333-73432-7
