= Ivan Andreyevich Khovansky (Tararui) =

Russian boyar

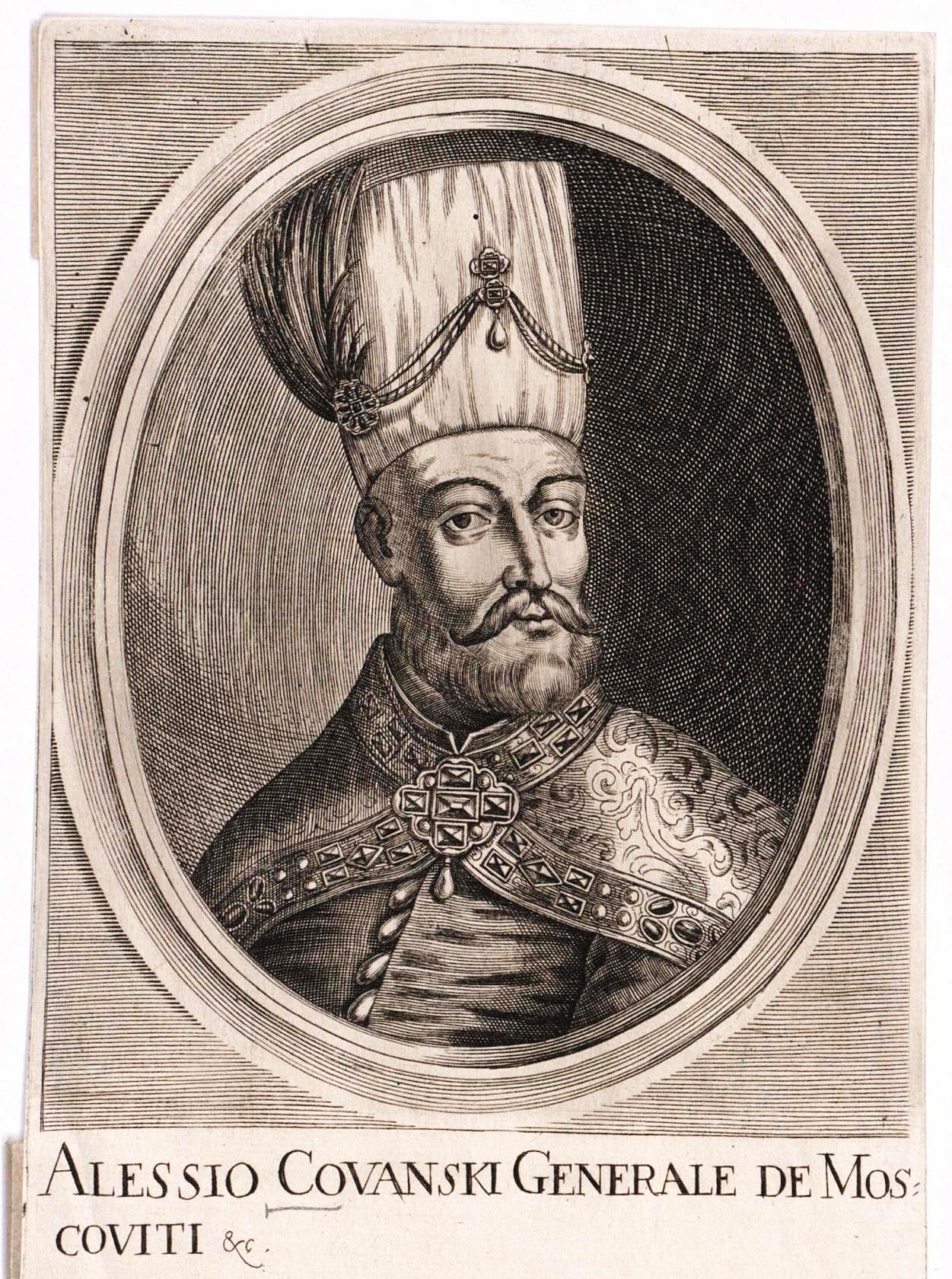
A 19th-century engraving

Prince Ivan Andreyevich Khovansky (Russian: Ива́н Андре́евич Хова́нский) was a Russian boyar who led the Streltsy during the Moscow Uprising of 1682, alternatively known as the Khovanshchina. His life was dramatized by Modest Mussorgsky in the opera Khovanshchina. Khovansky's moniker, Tararui, derives from the old Russian word for "chatterbox".

Khovansky came from the Lithuanian Gediminid dynasty, whose ancestors moved from Podolia to Moscow in 1408. He started his employment under Mikhail I as a stolnik. In 1650 he was sent to Tula to counter the raids of Crimean Tatars. In 1651–1654 he was governor in Vyazma, and in 1656 he was governor of Mogilev.

During the Russian-Polish-Swedish war he served as a voivod. In 1657 he blitzed a number of Swedes under Gdov. During the Russo-Polish War (1654–1667), he won the battle of Myadel on 8 February 1659. He was promoted to boyar on March 27, 1659. In January 1660 he attacked Brest and set it on fire. During the Copper Riot in Moscow on 25 July 1662 he dealt with insurgents and then led an investigation committee based in Kolomenskoe. In 1663 he was proclaimed a judge of the Yamskoi Prikaz. Between 1669–1678 he governed Pskov, Smolensk, and Novgorod. He was reputed as a dour and masterful manager who did not look kindly on local licentiousness and manners.

Upon Feodor III's death in April 1682, taking advantage of his popularity among the Streltsy, Khovansky helped to dismiss the Miloslavsky family from power. He engineered the great Streltsy uprising (May 15 to May 17, 1682), during which their old and unpopular leader, Prince Mikhail Dolgorukov, was murdered and Khovansky named his successor. Thus, he became de facto Minister of War of Muscovite Russia. Wishing to secure the allegiance of the Streltsy, he announced total forgiveness to those who took part in the uprising.

Through the support of the Streltsy he established a dual-reign regime, the joint rule of Ivan V and Peter I, under the regency of their sister Sophia Alekseyevna. As he supported the Old Believers he organized in 1682 a schismatic demonstration and forced Patriarch Joachim to agree to a public debate with one of the Old Believer leaders, Nikita Pustosvyat. The patriarch refuted Pustosvyat's arguments and the next day Sophia had Pustosvyat executed.

Relying on the Streltsy, Khovansky wielded enormous political influence and often interfered in the government affairs. In June 1682 he was appointed to lead the Prikaz of Judges. His uncommon arrogance and vanity alienated Sophia and her Miloslavsky relatives, while inducing jealousy on the part of other boyars.

Eventually, the rumours about Khovansky's intention to assassinate the Tsar's family and to usurp the throne prompted Sophia to evacuate Ivan V and Peter I from Moscow to Kolomenskoe and then to the St Savva monastery in Zvenigorod. In September a royal ukase declared Khovansky the mutineer and the patron of heretics, while the Boyar Duma had him sentenced to death. He was captured in Pushkino near Moscow and taken to Vozdvizhenskoe where he was beheaded together with his son.

When the news of Khovansky's execution reached the Streltsy stationed in Moscow, they started a riot and seized the Kremlin, but the regent soon quelled the mutinous army and appointed Fyodor Shaklovity as their new leader.
