= Alexandrina Miltcheva =

Bulgarian operatic mezzo-soprano (born 1934)

Alexandrina Miltcheva (also spelled Alexandrina Milcheva or Alexandrina Milcheva-Nonova; born 27 November 1934, in Smyadovo) is a Bulgarian operatic mezzo-soprano. Her career included leading roles at major European and American opera houses, and she is particularly associated with the mezzo-soprano repertory of Verdi, Rossini, Mozart, Bizet, French opera and Russian opera.

== Career ==
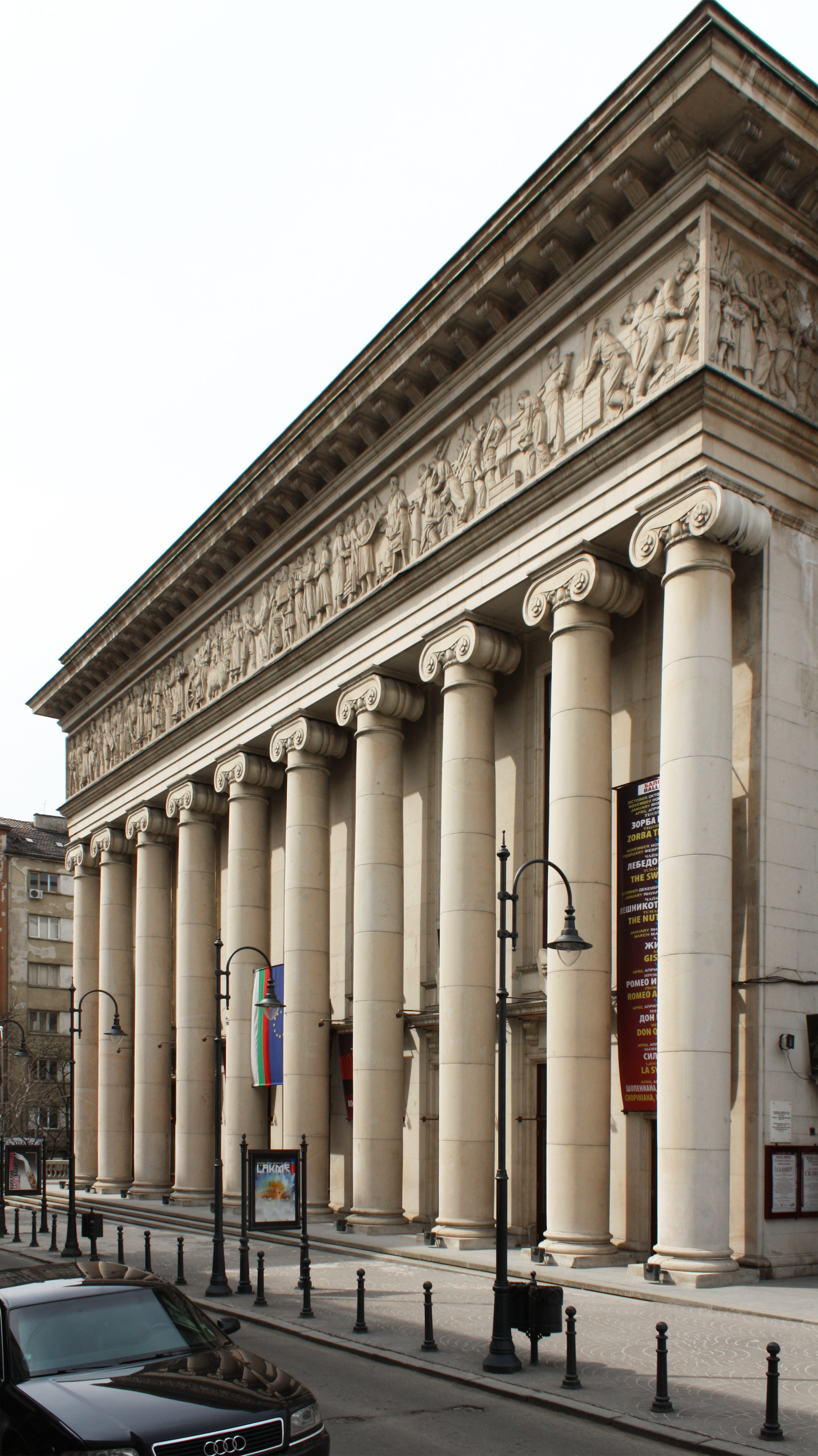
The Sofia National Opera.

Miltcheva studied singing in Bulgaria and worked with the Bulgarian composer and vocal pedagogue Georgi Zlatev-Cherkin. She began her professional activity in Varna, initially in the chorus and then as a soloist at the State Opera of Varna. She made her stage debut there as Dorabella in Mozart's Così fan tutte. In 1966 she won first prize at the Concours international de chant de Toulouse, a distinction that helped launch her international career and led to repeated appearances in Toulouse.

She became a member of the Sofia National Opera in 1968, where she made her debut as Angelina in Rossini's La Cenerentola and later sang roles including Carmen, Amneris in Aida, Azucena in Il trovatore, Marina in Boris Godunov and Marfa in Khovanshchina. Operissimo records that she was later engaged by major opera houses including La Scala, the Vienna State Opera, the Bavarian State Opera in Munich, the Hamburg State Opera, the San Francisco Opera, Covent Garden, the Bolshoi Theatre and the Teatro Colón in Buenos Aires.

In 1976, after a performance as Marina in Boris Godunov in Plovdiv, she was invited by Egon Seefehlner, then director of the Vienna State Opera, and subsequently became a regular soloist there. In 1978 she appeared at the Salzburg Festival as Azucena in Verdi's Il trovatore under Herbert von Karajan. Her international repertory included Mozart roles such as Sesto in La clemenza di Tito and Dorabella, Rossini's Angelina, Bellini's Adalgisa in Norma, Donizetti's La favorite, Bizet's Carmen, Massenet's Charlotte, Hérodiade and Dulcinée, Saint-Saëns's Dalila, and Russian roles such as Marina, Marfa and Konchakovna in Borodin's Prince Igor.

Miltcheva's French stage appearances included the Paris Opera, where Les Archives du spectacle lists her in productions including Le Prince Igor in 1975, Carmen and La forza del destino in 1981, Boris Godounov in 1984, Don Carlos in 1986, Aida and Adriana Lecouvreur in 1993, Un ballo in maschera in 1995, Madama Butterfly in 1994 and 1999, Falstaff in 1999, The Queen of Spades in 2001 and Eugene Onegin in 2003. According to Operissimo, she sang Preziosilla in La forza del destino and Carmen in Paris in 1981, and made her first Eboli in the original French version of Don Carlos at the Palais Garnier in the 1986–1987 season.

She made her Metropolitan Opera debut on 8 April 1987 as Dalila in Saint-Saëns's Samson et Dalila, opposite Jon Vickers as Samson, with Jean Fournet conducting. She also appeared at Carnegie Hall in Rigoletto with the Philadelphia Orchestra under Riccardo Muti.

Alongside opera, Miltcheva has maintained a chamber-music and song repertory, especially Russian songs and lieder. She performed for decades with pianist Svetla Protich, including recitals at La Scala. She later taught singing and founded her own school in 1994. In 2015, on the occasion of a benefit concert with her students at the Sofia Opera, she received the Bulgarian Ministry of Culture's "Golden Century – Star" distinction. In 2024, on the occasion of her 90th birthday, Miltcheva was awarded the Bulgarian Ministry of Culture's highest distinction, the "Golden Age" necklace, for her exceptional contribution to Bulgarian culture. At the same ceremony at the Sofia Opera, she also received the "Crystal Necklace" of the Union of Bulgarian Music and Dance Professionals, an honorary diploma from the Sofia Opera and a congratulatory address from President Rumen Radev.

== Recordings ==
Miltcheva's commercial discography includes complete opera recordings, concert works, song recordings and educational/accompaniment releases. Her name appears in catalogues under several spellings, including Milcheva, Miltcheva and Milcheva-Nonova.

- Bizet: Carmen – Alexandrina Milcheva (Carmen), Nikola Nikolov (Don José), Liliana Vassileva (Micaëla), Nicola Ghiuselev (Escamillo); Sofia National Opera Chorus and Orchestra, Ivan Marinov. Capriccio C51183.
- Verdi: Aida – Alexandrina Milcheva (Amneris), Yulia Wiener-Chenisheva (Aida), Nikola Nikolov (Radamès), Nicola Ghiuselev (Ramfis); Sofia National Opera Chorus and Orchestra, Ivan Marinov. Capriccio C51198.
- Mussorgsky: Khovanshchina – Alexandrina Milcheva (Marfa), Nicola Ghiuselev, Dimitar Petkov, Todor Kostov, Lyubomir Bodourov, Stoyan Popov; Sofia National Opera Orchestra, Bulgarian National Svetoslav Obretenov Choir, Atanas Margaritov. Recorded in 1978; Capriccio C10789–91.
- Borodin: Prince Igor – Alexandrina Miltcheva (Konchakovna), Nicolai Ghiaurov, Nicola Ghiuselev, Stefka Evstatieva, Kaludi Kaludov; Sofia National Opera Chorus, Sofia Festival Orchestra, Emil Tchakarov. Sony Classical, recorded in Sofia in 1987 and issued in 1990.
- Puccini: Madama Butterfly – Alexandrina Milcheva-Nonova (Suzuki), Raina Kabaivanska (Cio-Cio-San), Nazzareno Antinori (Pinkerton), Nelson Portella (Sharpless); Sofia Philharmonic Orchestra, Bulgarian National Choir, Gabriele Bellini. Balkanton/Frequenz; Arts 47161-2.
- Leoncavallo: La bohème – Alexandrina Milcheva (Musette), Lucia Popp, Franco Bonisolli, Bernd Weikl, Alan Titus; Chor des Bayerischen Rundfunks, Münchner Rundfunkorchester, Heinz Wallberg. Recorded in Munich in 1981; Orfeo C023822H.
- Gluck: Le cinesi – Alexandrina Milcheva, Kaaren Erickson, Marga Schiml, Thomas Moser; Münchner Rundfunkorchester, Lamberto Gardelli. Orfeo C178891A.
- Verdi: Messa da Requiem – Alexandrina Milcheva, Júlia Várady, Alberto Cupido, Nicola Ghiuselev; ORF Choir, ORF Vienna Radio Symphony Orchestra, Leif Segerstam. Recorded live on 3 October 1980; Orfeo C210232.
- Cilea: Adriana Lecouvreur – Alexandrina Milcheva-Nonova (Principessa di Bouillon), Raina Kabaivanska, Alberto Cupido, Dimiter Stanchev; Bulgarian Television and Radio Symphony Orchestra, Maurizio Arena. RCA Red Seal RD 71206.
- Rimsky-Korsakov: The Snow Maiden – Alexandrina Milcheva, Elena Zemenkova, Nicola Ghiuselev, Avram Andreev, Stefka Mineva, Stefka Evstatieva; Bulgarian Radio Symphony Orchestra and Chorus, Stoyan Angelov. Recorded in 1985; Brilliant Classics 94626.
- Rimsky-Korsakov: Boyarinya Vera Sheloga – Alexandrina Milcheva, Stefka Evstatieva, Stefka Mineva, Peter Bakardzhiev, Dimiter Stanchev; Bulgarian Radio Symphony Orchestra, Stoyan Angelov. Capriccio C10762.
- Mozart: Conservati fedele, K. 23 – Alexandrina Milcheva, mezzo-soprano; Sofia Philharmonic Orchestra, Rouslan Raychev. Balkanton/MIK Balkanton, 1980.
- Mussorgsky: Enfantines / In the Nursery / Kinderstube – Alexandrina Milcheva, mezzo-soprano; Svetla Protich, piano. Harmonia Mundi France HM B 151.
- Gershwin: Porgy and Bess excerpts – Alexandrina Milcheva, Ivan Konsoulov, Nikola Smochevski; Bulgarian Radio Symphony Orchestra and Chorus, Alexander Vladigerov. Capriccio, 2004.
- The Best of Gershwin – includes Summertime from Porgy and Bess with Alexandrina Milcheva-Nonova, Bulgarian Radio Symphony Orchestra and Alexander Vladigerov. Resonance CDRSN3101.
- French Arias for Mezzo Soprano and Orchestra – Alexandrina Milcheva, mezzo-soprano; Orchestra of the Sofia National Opera, Nayden Todorov conductor. Music Minus One MMO4086, 2006.

== See also ==
- Blagovesta Mekki-Tzvetkova
