= Vasily Golitsyn (born 1643) =

Russian aristocrat and statesman (1643–1714)

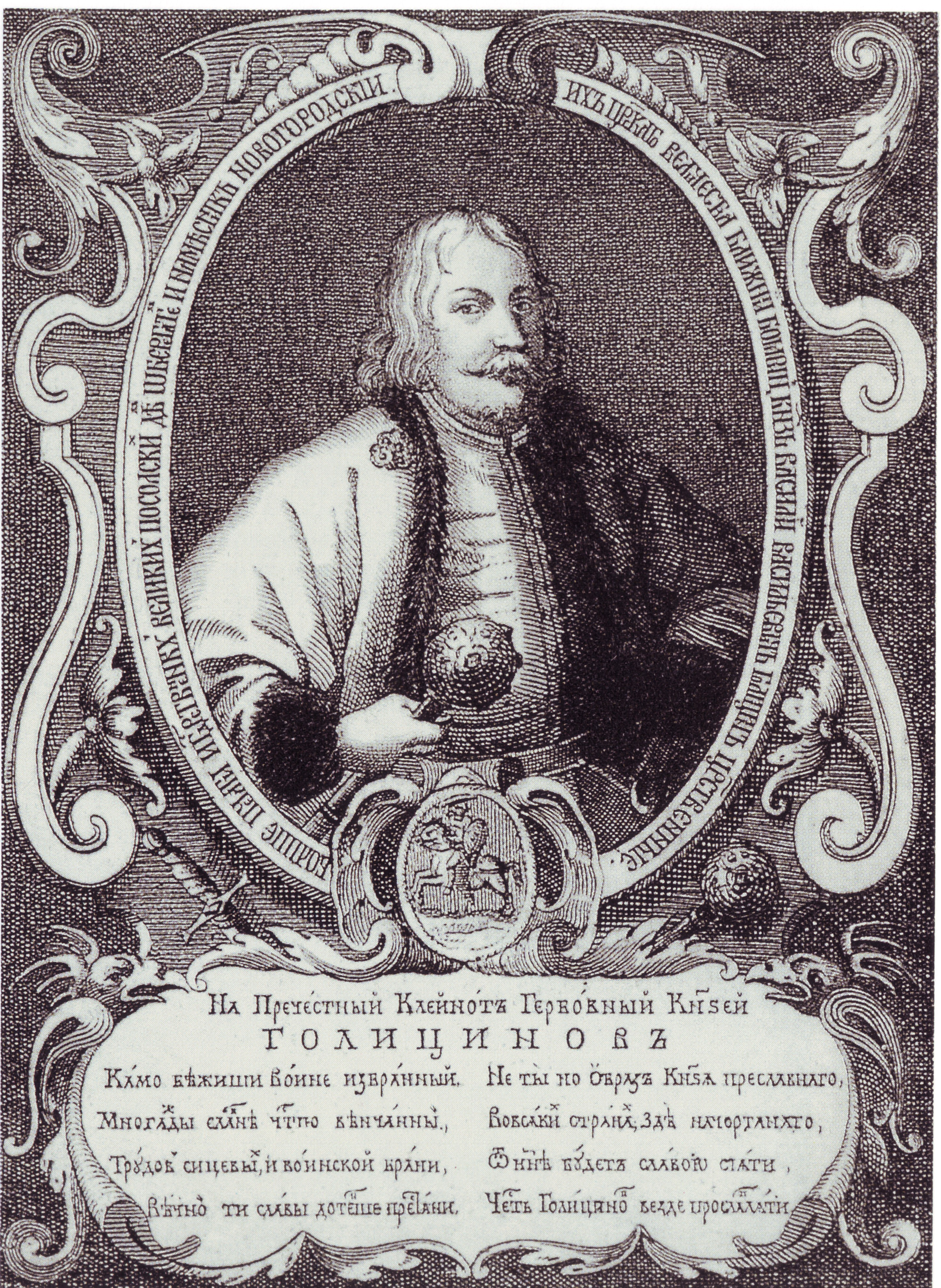
Prince Vasily Golitsyn

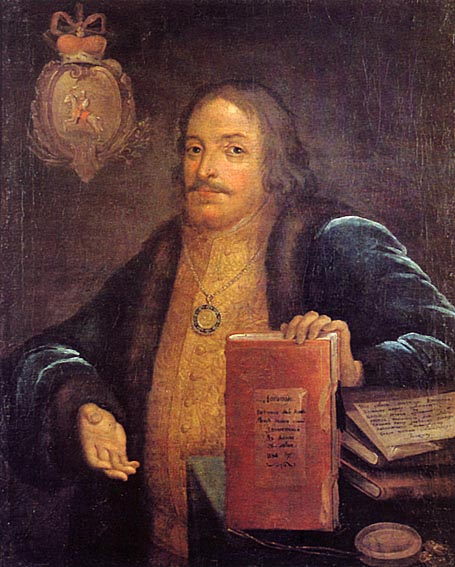
Vasily Golitsyn

Prince Vasily Vasilyevich Golitsyn (Russian: Василий Васильевич Голицын, romanized: Vasilij Vasiljevič Golicyn; 1643–1714) was a Russian aristocrat and statesman of the 17th century. He belonged to the Golitsyn as well as Romodanovsky Muscovite noble families. His main political opponent was his cousin Prince Boris Alexeyevich Golitsyn.

== Biography ==
Golitsyn spent his early days at the court of Tsar Aleksey Mikhailovich (reigned 1645–1676), where he gradually rose to the rank of boyar. In 1676 he was sent to Ukraine to restrain the Crimean Tatars and took part in the Chigirin campaign of the Russo-Turkish War of 1676-1681. Personal experience of the inconveniences and dangers of the prevailing system of preferment - the so-called mestnichestvo, or rank priority, which had paralyzed the Russian armies for centuries - induced him to propose its abolition, which Tsar Feodor III carried out in 1678.

The May revolution of 1682 placed Vasily Golitsyn at the head of the Posolsky Prikaz, or Ministry of Foreign Affairs. During the regency (1682–1689) of Sophia, the half-sister of Peter the Great, whose intimate friend he became, he served as the principal minister of state (1682–1689) and as keeper of the great seal, a title bestowed upon only two Russians before him, Afanasy Ordin-Nashchokin (1605–1680) and Artamon Matveyev (1625–1682).

In home affairs his influence was insignificant, but his foreign policy was distinguished by the Treaty of Nerchinsk (1689), which set the Russo-Chinese border north of the Amur River, and by the Eternal Peace Treaty of 1686 with Poland, whereby Russia at last definitively recovered Kiev. By the terms of the same treaty, Russia acceded to the grand league against the Porte. Golitsyn's two expeditions against Crimea, the Crimean campaigns of 1687 and 1689 proved unsuccessful, and made him extremely unpopular.

Only with the utmost difficulty could Sophia get the young tsar Peter to decorate the defeated commander-in-chief as if he had returned a victor. In the political contest between Sophia and Peter of August–September 1689, Golitsyn half-heartedly supported his mistress and shared her ruin. Peter spared his life – owing to the supplications of his cousin Boris – but deprived him of his boyardom, confiscated his estates and banished him successively to Kargopol, to Mezen and to Kholmogory, where he died on 21 April 1714.

Golitsyn was unusually well educated. He was a great friend of foreigners, who generally alluded to him as "the great Golitsyn". He expounded to them some drastic reform measures, such as the abolition of serfdom, the promotion of religious toleration, and the development of industrial enterprises. As Golitsyn was eager to avoid all forms of violence and repression, his program was more cautious and "realistic" than that of Peter the Great. Political upheavals prevented him from executing any of these plans.
