= Streltsy =

Russian firearm infantry and social class (16th–18th centuries)

- Russian: стрельцы
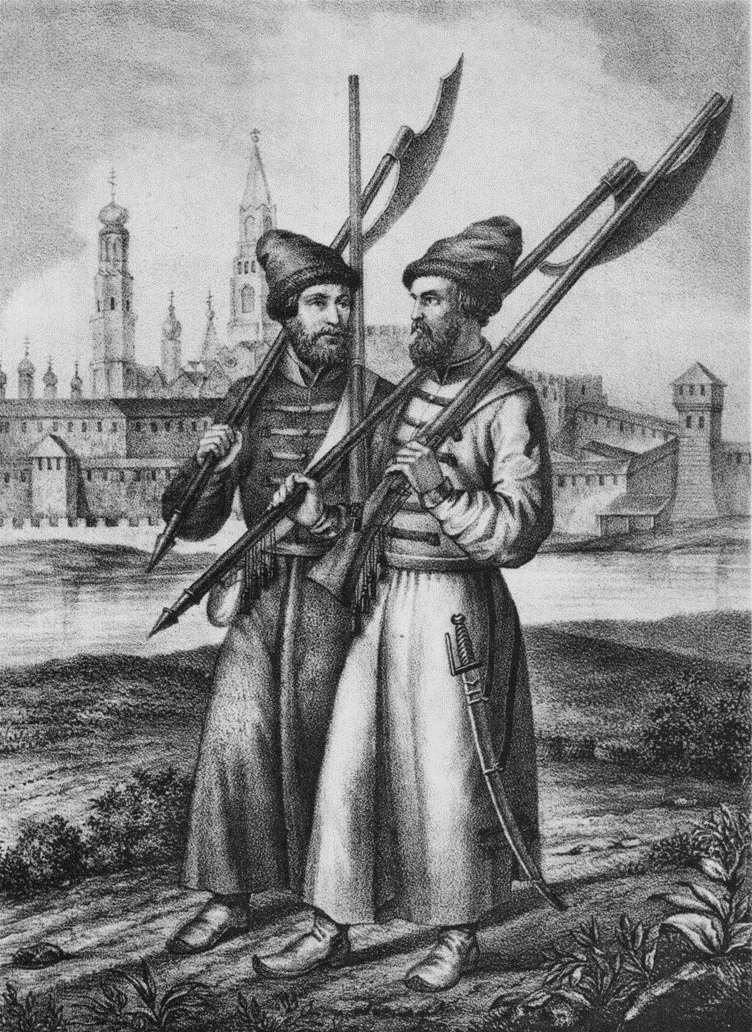
- Active: 1550–1720
- Country: Russia
- Type: Infantry
- Part of: Russian Army
- Garrison/HQ: Moscow
- Patron: Saint George
- Engagements: Siege of Kazan; Livonian War; Battle of Molodi; Polish–Russian War (1609–1618); Smolensk War; Russo-Polish War (1654–1667); Great Northern War

Commanders
- Notable commanders: Ivan the Terrible

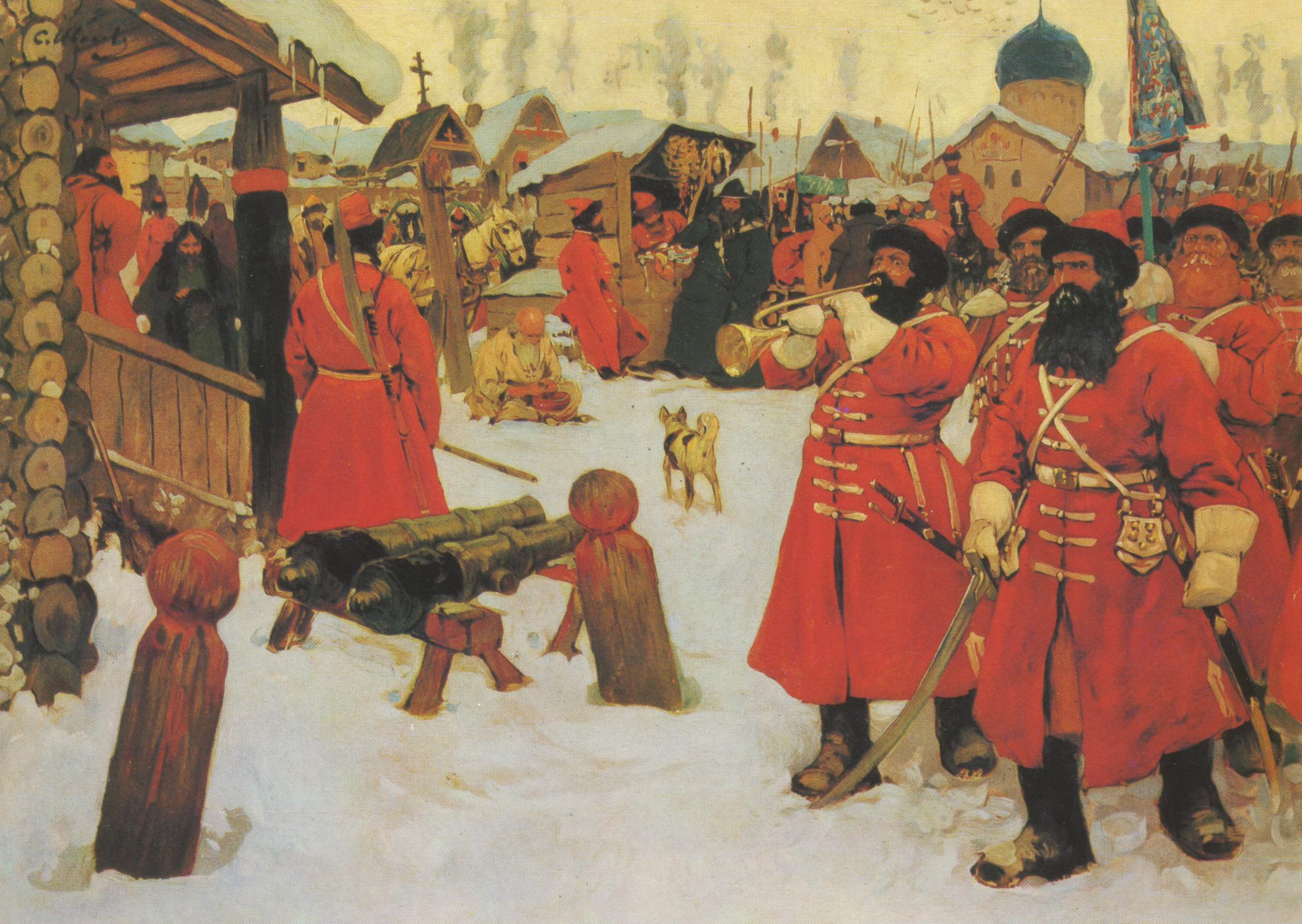
Streltsy by Sergey Ivanov

The streltsy (Russian: стрельцы, lit. 'shooters/firearm troops', IPA: [strʲɪlʲˈt͡sɨ]; sing. стрелец, strelets, IPA: [strʲɪˈlʲet͡s]) were the units of Russian firearm infantry from the 16th century to the early 18th century and also a social stratum, from which personnel for streltsy troops were traditionally recruited. They are also collectively known as streletskoye voysko (стрелецкое войско, 'firearm troops'). These infantry troops reinforced feudal levy horsemen or pomestnoye voysko (поместное войско).

The first units were established by Ivan the Terrible as part of the first Russian standing army. The streltsy were under the administration of the Streletsky prikaz from 1571. Peter the Great curtailed the influence of the streltsy, and following the streltsy uprising of 1698, streltsy units began to be disbanded. However, it was not until the 1720s that this process was completed.

== Origins and organization ==
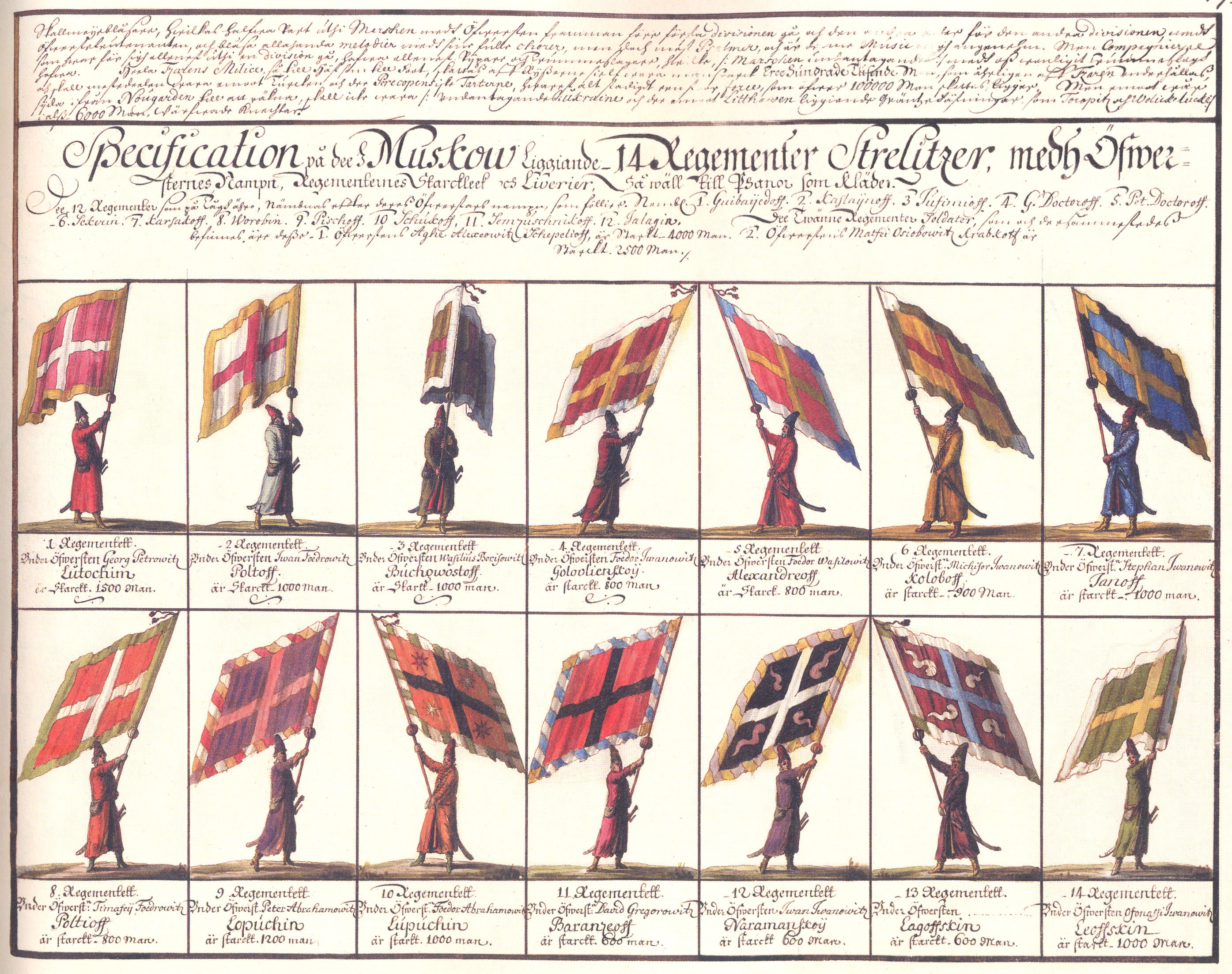
Colours and uniforms of the 14 Moscow streltsy regiments in 1674.

The first streltsy units were created by Ivan the Terrible sometime between 1545 and 1550 and armed with arquebuses. During his reign, Russia was fighting wars almost continuously, including the Livonian War against Scandinavia and the Polish–Lithuanian Commonwealth in the north and wars against the khanates of the south. They first saw combat at the siege of Kazan in 1552.

Tsar Ivan passed a decree on 1 October 1550 "on the stationing in Moscow and surrounding districts of one thousand service people," which is considered to be the formal founding of the streltsy regiments.

Initially, streltsy were recruited from among the free tradespeople and from the rural population. Later, military service in this unit became lifelong and hereditary. While earlier in the 16th century they had been an elite force, their effectiveness was reduced by poor training and lack of choice in recruiting. Streltsy were subdivided into "select" (выборные, vybornyje), later "Muscovite" (московские); and "municipal" (городские, in different Russian cities).

- The Muscovite streltsy guarded the Kremlin, performed general guard duty, and participated in military operations. They also carried out general policing and fire brigade functions in Moscow. Grigory Kotoshikhin, a Russian diplomat who had spied for and then defected to the Swedish Empire in the 1660s, reported that they used axes and buckets and copper pumps as well as hooks to pull down adjacent buildings so that fires would not spread. Adam Olearius, a German who traveled to Russia in the 17th century, noted that they never used water.
- The municipal streltsy performed garrison and border duty and carried out orders of the local government.

The streltsy came under the control of the Streletsky prikaz (стрелецкий приказ). In times of war, they came under their superiors. The municipal streltsy were also under the jurisdiction of the local voivodes (local governors or semi-independent rulers).

The largest military administrative unit of the streltsy forces was the body responsible for the issuing of gear or kit (прибор). This body was later renamed prikaz (приказ, 'office, department'), and in 1681, regiments (полк). The commanders of the streltsy (стрелецкие головы) and colonels in charge of regiments served as senior officers of the prikazy. They had to be nobles and were appointed by the government.

Regiments were subdivided into "Hundreds" (сотни) and "Decades" (десятки, desyatki, 'tens'). They could be dragoons or cavalry (стремянные, 'with stirrups') or footsoldiers (пешие).

== Uniforms and equipment ==
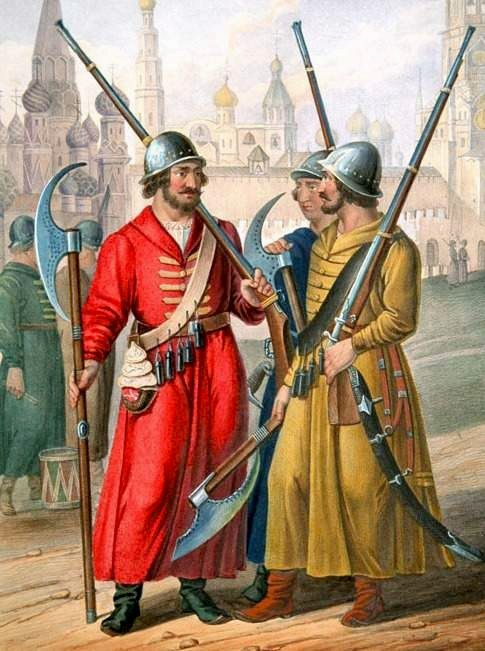
Streltsy

The streltsy had uniforms that were similar in cut but in different colours according to regiment. These uniform coats were red, yellow, blue or green (kaftans) with orange or natural leather coloured boots. Training and weapons were also standardised. Their primary weapon was an arquebus or musket, and they carried pollaxes or bardiches, and sabres for defense. Some units used pikes. The longer weapons were also used to support the arquebus or musket while firing.

== Service conditions ==
The Russian government was chronically short of cash and so often did not pay the streltsy well. While "entitled" to an estimated four rubles a year in the 1550s, they were often allowed to farm or trade in order to supplement their incomes. This reduced their combat effectiveness and often their desire to go on campaigns, since a season campaigning meant loss of income.

The streltsy and their families lived in their own neighborhoods or districts settlements and received money and bread from the State Treasury. In certain locations, the streltsy were granted strips of land instead of money. The streltsy settlement in Moscow was located near where the main campus of Moscow State University now stands.

== Military tactics ==
Military commanders deployed the streltsy in static formations, often against set formations or fortifications. They often fired from a platform and employed a mobile wooden "fortification" known in Russian as a "gulyay-gorod" (literally a "walking fort"). They reportedly fired in volley or caracole fashion, the first line firing and then stepping back to reload while the second line stepped forward to fire.

== Politics ==
At the end of the 16th century, there were 20,000 to 25,000 streltsy. In 1681, there were 55,000, including 22,500 in Moscow alone. The engagements of the streltsy in handicrafts and trade led to a significant proprietary inequality among them and their blending with tradesmen. Even though the streltsy demonstrated their fighting efficiency on several occasions, such as during the siege of Kazan in 1552, the war with Livonia, the Northern Wars in the early 17th century, and military operations in Poland and Crimea, in the second half of the 17th century, the streltsy started to display their backwardness compared to the regular soldier or reiter regiments (see Imperial Russian Army).

Military service hardships, frequent salary delays, abuse on the part of local administration and commanders led to regular streltsy, especially the poorest ones, to participate in anti-serfdom uprisings in the 17th and early 18th centuries. These included the peasant wars in the Time of Troubles and after the last Rurikids were replaced by the Romanov tsars at the beginning of the 17th century and in 1670–1671 (such as by the cossacks of Stenka Razin), urban uprisings such as the Moscow uprising of 1682, the streltsy uprising of 1698, and the Bulavin Rebellion of 1705–1706 in Astrakhan.

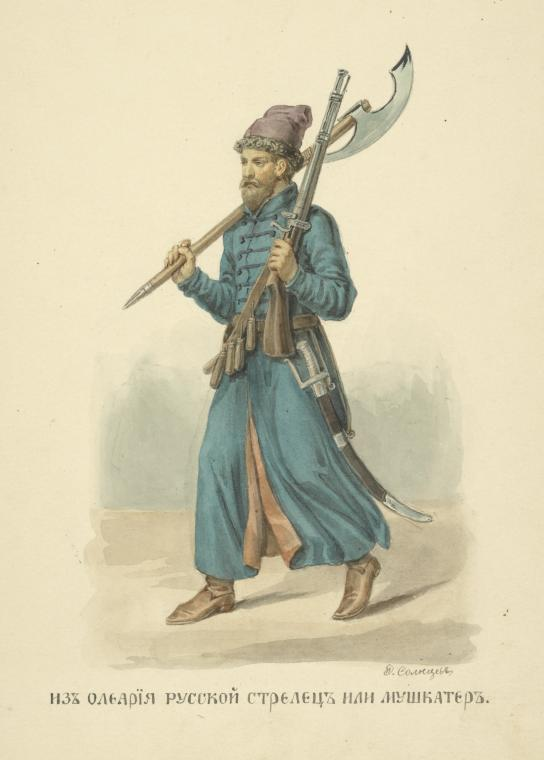
Strelets (17th century)

At the same time, those streltsy who had been on top of the hierarchy enjoyed their social status and, therefore, tried to hold back the regular streltsy forces and keep them on the government’s side. In the late 17th century, the streltsy of Moscow began to actively participate in a struggle for power between different government groups, supporting the Old Believers and showing hostility towards any foreign innovations.

The streltsy became something of a "praetorian element" in Muscovite politics in the late 17th century. In 1682, they attempted to prevent Peter I from coming to the throne in favor of his half-brother, Ivan V.

== Disbandment ==
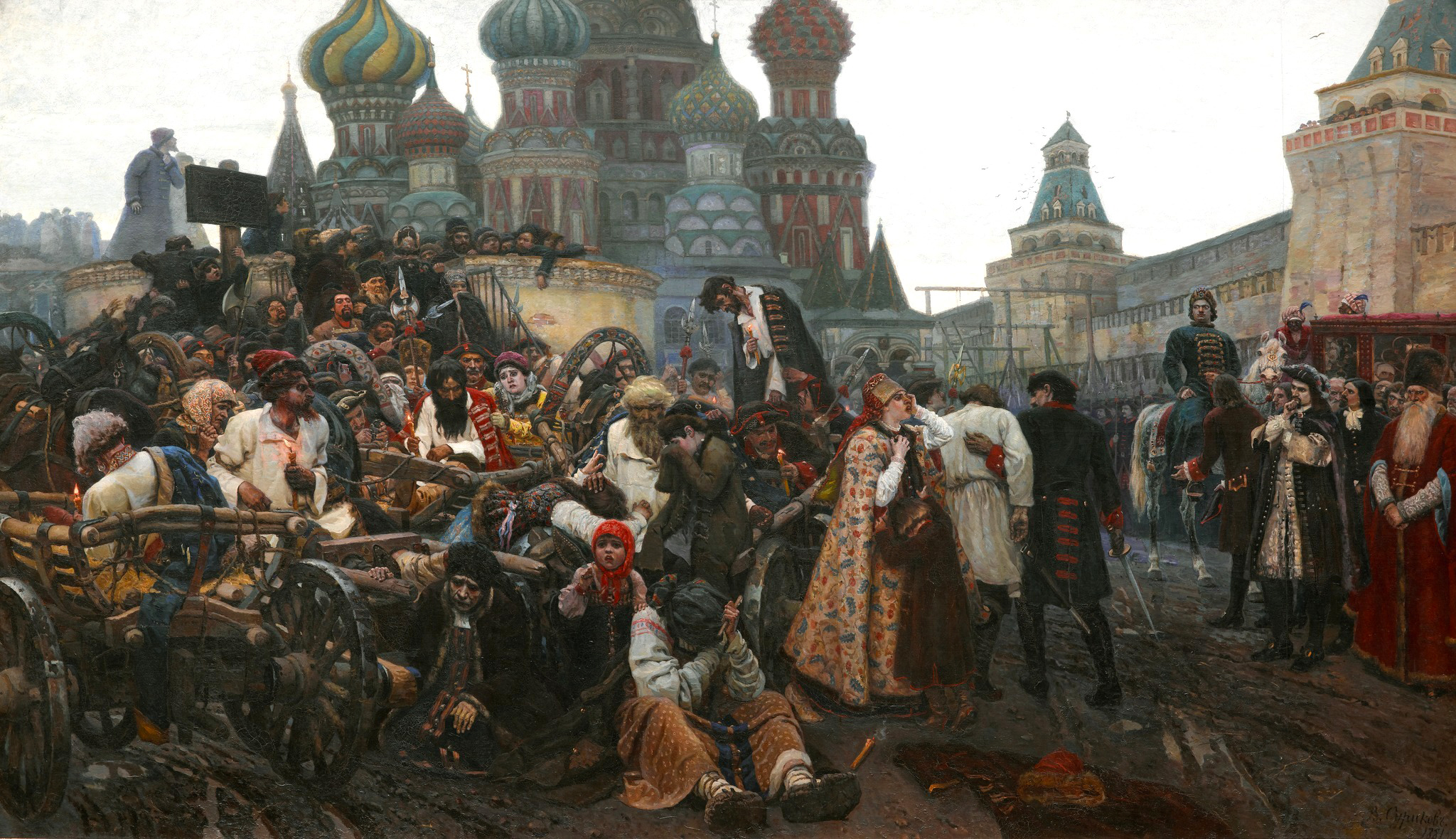
The Morning of the Streltsy Execution after their failed uprising in 1698 by Vasily Surikov (1848-1916).

After the fall of Sophia Alekseyevna in 1689, the government of Peter I engaged in a process of gradual limitation of the streltsy's military and political influence. Eight Moscow regiments were removed from the city and transferred to Belgorod, Sevsk, and Kiev.

In spite of these measures, the streltsy revolted yet again during the Grand Embassy of Peter the Great in Europe. Although the revolt was put down by the Scottish general Patrick Gordon who had entered Russian service under Alexis I in 1661 even before the tsar's return to Russia, Peter cut short his embassy and returned to crush the streltsy with reprisals, including public executions and torture.

Tortures included roasting the bare back, tearing flesh with iron hooks, and crushing feet in wooden presses called butuks. Executions included being broken on the wheel and being buried alive. Many of the bodies were hung around Novodevichy Convent where Sophia Alekseyevna and Eudoxia were confined for aiding the rebellion.

The corps was technically abolished in 1689. After having suffered a defeat at Narva in 1700, the government stopped their disbandment. The most efficient streltsy regiments took part in the most important military operations of the Great Northern War and in Peter’s Pruth River Campaign of 1711. Gradually, the streltsy were incorporated into the regular army. At the same time, the Municipal Streltsy started to be disbanded.

The liquidation of most streltsy units was finished in the 1720s. The Municipal Streltsy were kept in some cities until the late 18th century.

The Preobrazhensky Regiment and the Semyonovsky Regiment of the Imperial Guard replaced the streltsy and the traditional ryndy as the tsar's bodyguards.

== See also ==
- History of Russian military ranks
- Infantry
