= Minister of Foreign Affairs (Russia) =

Cabinet-level position in the Russian government

Minister of Foreign Affairs of the Russian Federation
- Министр иностранных дел Российской Федерации
- Emblem of the Ministry of Foreign Affairs

- Flag of the Ministry of Foreign Affairs

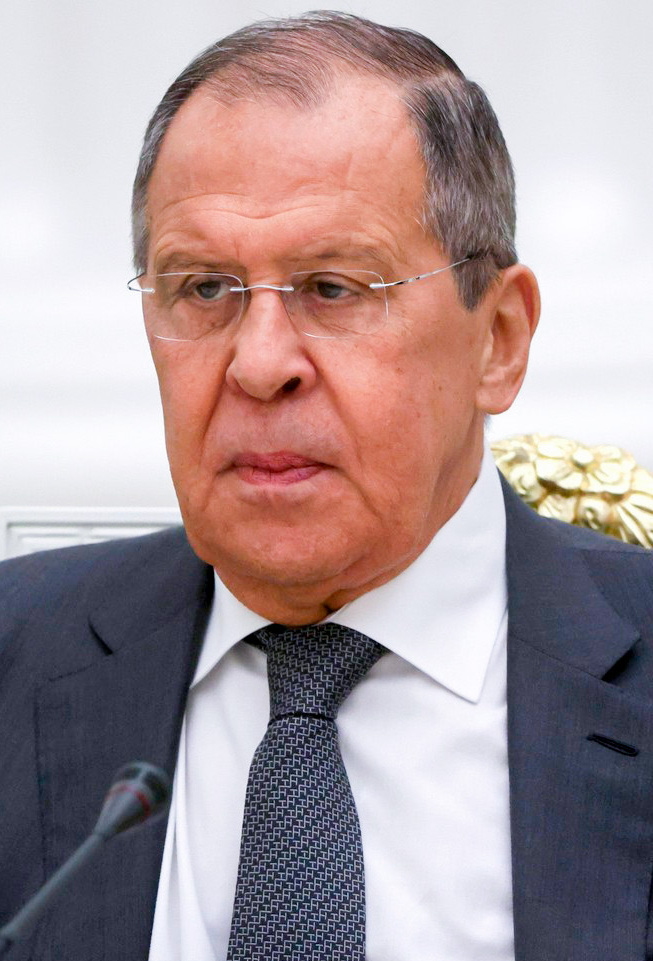
- Incumbent; Sergey Lavrov since 24 February 2004
- Ministry of Foreign Affairs
- Member of: Government; Security Council
- Reports to: President
- Seat: Foreign Affairs Building, Moscow
- Appointer: President; (after consultation with the Federation Council)
- Term length: No fixed term
- First holder: Andrei Kozyrev (post-Soviet era)
- Website: www.mid.ru/minister

The minister of foreign affairs of the Russian Federation (Russian: Министры иностранных дел России, romanized: Ministry inostrannykh del Rossii) is a high-ranking Russian government official who heads the ministry of foreign affairs of the Russian Federation. The foreign minister is one of the five presidential ministers, along with the ministers of defence, interior, emergencies and justice. Although they are members of the Cabinet, they are directly subordinate to the President.

The foreign minister, like other presidential ministers, is nominated and appointed by the President after consultation with the Federation Council (whereas non-presidential ministers are nominated by the Prime Minister and appointed by the President after approval by the State Duma). The foreign minister is also a permanent member of the Russian Security Council.

== Tsardom of Russia ==
Portrait	Name	Term of office		Head of State
Heads of Ambassadorial Prikaz
	Ivan Viskovatyi	January 2, 1549	August 2, 1562	Ivan IV
	Andrey Vasilyev	September, 1562	July 25, 1570	Ivan IV
	Andrey Shchelkalov	November, 1570	June 17, 1594	Ivan IV
	Andrey Shchelkalov	November, 1570	June 17, 1594	Feodor I
	Vasily Shchelkalov	June 30, 1594	May 1601	Feodor I
	Vasily Shchelkalov	June 30, 1594	May 1601	Boris Godunov
	Afanasy Vlasyev	May 1601	May 8, 1605	Boris Godunov
	Ivan Gramotin	August 1605	February 14, 1606	False Dmitriy I
	Vasily Telepnev	1606	March 1611	Vasili IV
	Vasily Telepnev	1606	March 1611	False Dmitry II
	Ivan Gramotin	November 20, 1611	September 1612	False Dmitry II
	Fyodor Androsov (Acting)	September 1612	June 1613	False Dmitry II
	Pyotr Tretyakov	June 1613	May 16, 1618	Michael
	Ivan Gramotin	May 1618	December 21, 1626	Michael
	Yefim Telepnyov	December 22, 1626	July 30, 1630	Michael
	Fyodor Likhachov	September 21, 1630	December 25, 1631	Michael
	Ivan Gryazev	October 1, 1632	April 17, 1634	Michael
	Ivan Gramotin	May 19, 1634	July 19, 1635	Michael
	Fyodor Likhachov	September 21, 1635	September 1, 1643	Michael
	Grigory Lvov	September 1, 1643	December 27, 1646	Michael
	Grigory Lvov	September 1, 1643	December 27, 1646	Alexis
	Nazary Chistoy	January 6, 1647	June 2, 1648	Alexis
	Mikhail Volosheninov	July 4, 1648	April 1653	Alexis
	Almaz Ivanov	September 28, 1653	March 10, 1667	Alexis
	Afanasy Ordin-Nashchokin	July 15, 1667	February 21, 1671	Alexis
	Artamon Matveyev	February 22, 1671	July 3, 1676	Alexis
	Larion Ivanov	July 4, 1676	December 21, 1680	Feodor III
	Vasily Volynsky	December 21, 1680	May 6, 1681	Feodor III
	Larion Ivanov (Acting)	May 6, 1681	May 15, 1682	Feodor III
	Vasily Golitsyn	May 17, 1682	September 6, 1689	Ivan V and Peter I (regency of Sofia Alekseyevna)
	Yemelyan Ukraintsev	September 6, 1689	April 19, 1699	Ivan V and Peter I
	Yemelyan Ukraintsev	September 6, 1689	April 19, 1699	Peter I
	Lev Naryshkin	1697	1699	Peter I
	Fyodor Golovin	February 18, 1700	August 2, 1706	Peter I
	Pyotr Shafirov	September 1706	1708	Peter I
	Gavriil Golovkin	1708	15 December 1717	Peter I

== Russian Empire ==
Portrait	Name	Term of office		Head of State
Presidents of the Collegium of Foreign Affairs
	Gavriil Golovkin	15 December 1717	January 20, 1734	Peter I
	Gavriil Golovkin	15 December 1717	January 20, 1734	Catherine I
	Gavriil Golovkin	15 December 1717	January 20, 1734	Peter II
	Gavriil Golovkin	15 December 1717	January 20, 1734	Anna
	Andrey Osterman	1734	1740	Anna
	Aleksey Tcherkassky	November 10, 1740	November 4, 1742	Ivan VI
	Alexey Bestuzhev-Ryumin	November 4, 1742	February 15, 1758	Elizabeth
	Mikhail Vorontsov	November 23, 1758	October 27, 1763	Elizabeth
	Mikhail Vorontsov	November 23, 1758	October 27, 1763	Peter III
	Nikita Panin	October 27, 1763	April 10, 1781	Catherine II
	Ivan Osterman	April 10, 1781	May 2, 1797	Catherine II
	Aleksandr Bezborodko	May 2, 1797	April 6, 1799	Paul I
	Fyodor Rostopchin	April 6, 1799	February 20, 1801	Paul I
	Nikita Panin	March 23, 1801	September 30, 1801	Alexander I
	Viktor Kochubey	September 30, 1801	September 8, 1802	Alexander I
Ministers of Foreign Affairs
	Alexander Vorontsov	September 8, 1802	January 16, 1804	Alexander I
	Adam Jerzy Czartoryski	January 16, 1804	June 17, 1806	Alexander I
	Andreas Eberhard von Budberg	June 17, 1806	August 30, 1807	Alexander I
	Nikolay Rumyantsev	February 12, 1808	August 1, 1814	Alexander I
	Ioannis Kapodistrias (Joint with Karl Nesselrode)	August 21, 1816	August 19, 1822	Alexander I
	Karl Nesselrode	August 9, 1816	April 15, 1856	Alexander I
	Karl Nesselrode	August 9, 1816	April 15, 1856	Nicholas I
	Alexander Gorchakov	April 15, 1856	April 9, 1882	Alexander II
	Nikolay Girs	April 9, 1882	January 26, 1895	Alexander III
	Alexei Lobanov-Rostovsky	March 18, 1895	August 30, 1896	Nicholas II
	Nikolay Shishkin	September 1, 1896	January 13, 1897	Nicholas II
	Mikhail Muravyov	January 13, 1897	June 21, 1900	Nicholas II
	Vladimir Lambsdorff	January 6, 1901	May 11, 1906	Nicholas II
	Alexander Izvolsky	May 11, 1906	October 11, 1910	Nicholas II
	Sergey Sazonov	October 11, 1910	July 20, 1916	Nicholas II
	Boris Stürmer	July 20, 1916	November 23, 1916	Nicholas II
	Nikolay Pokrovsky	November 23, 1916	March 2, 1917	Nicholas II

== Provisional Government ==
Minister	Party	Term of Office		Prime Minister
Ministers of Foreign Affairs
Pavel Milyukov	Constitutional Democratic Party	March 2, 1917	May 1, 1917	George Lvov
Mikhail Tereshchenko	Independent	May 5, 1917	November 7, 1917	George Lvov
Mikhail Tereshchenko	Independent	May 5, 1917	November 7, 1917	Alexander Kerensky

== Russian SFSR (1917–1991) ==
Minister	Party	Term of Office		Head of State
People's Commissars of Foreign Affairs
Leon Trotsky	Social Democratic Labour Party (Bolshevik)	November 7, 1917	March 13, 1918	Lev Kamenev
Georgy Chicherin	Communist Party	April 9, 1918	July 6, 1923	Lev Kamenev
Post abolished (1923–1944). Power transferred to Ministry of Foreign Affairs of the Soviet Union.
Anatoly Lavrentiev	Communist Party	March 8, 1944	March 13, 1946	Nikolay Shvernik
Post abolished
Ministers of Foreign Affairs
Mikhail Yakovlev	Communist Party	April 16, 1959	August 5, 1960	Nikolai Ignatov
Mikhail Yakovlev	Communist Party	April 16, 1959	August 5, 1960	Nikolay Organov
Sergey Lapin	Communist Party	September 5, 1960	January 20, 1962	Nikolay Organov
Mikhail Menshikov	Communist Party	February 1, 1962	September 11, 1968	Nikolay Organov
Mikhail Menshikov	Communist Party	February 1, 1962	September 11, 1968	Nikolai Ignatov
Mikhail Menshikov	Communist Party	February 1, 1962	September 11, 1968	Mikhail Yasnov
Aleksei A. Rodionov	Communist Party	September 11, 1968	May 7, 1971	Mikhail Yasnov
Fyodor Titov	Communist Party	May 7, 1971	May 28, 1982	Mikhail Yasnov
Vladimir Vinogradov	Communist Party	May 28, 1982	June 15, 1990	Mikhail Yasnov
Vladimir Vinogradov	Communist Party	May 28, 1982	June 15, 1990	Vladimir Orlov
Vladimir Vinogradov	Communist Party	May 28, 1982	June 15, 1990	Vitaly Vorotnikov
Andrey Kozyrev	Independent	October 11, 1990	December 26, 1991	Boris Yeltsin

== Russian Federation (1991–present) ==
Minister	Term of Office		Party	Cabinet	President
Ministers of Foreign Affairs
Andrei Kozyrev	December 27, 1991	January 5, 1996	Independent	Yeltsin–Gaidar	Boris Yeltsin
Andrei Kozyrev	December 27, 1991	January 5, 1996	Independent	Chernomyrdin I	Boris Yeltsin
Yevgeny Primakov	January 9, 1996	September 11, 1998	Independent	Chernomyrdin I	Boris Yeltsin
Yevgeny Primakov	January 9, 1996	September 11, 1998	Independent	Chernomyrdin II	Boris Yeltsin
Yevgeny Primakov	January 9, 1996	September 11, 1998	Independent	Kiriyenko	Boris Yeltsin
Igor Ivanov	September 30, 1998	February 24, 2004	Independent	Primakov	Boris Yeltsin
Igor Ivanov	September 30, 1998	February 24, 2004	Independent	Stepashin	Boris Yeltsin
Igor Ivanov	September 30, 1998	February 24, 2004	Independent	Putin I	Boris Yeltsin
Igor Ivanov	September 30, 1998	February 24, 2004	Independent	Kasyanov	Vladimir Putin
Sergey Lavrov	February 24, 2004	Incumbent	United Russia	Fradkov I	Vladimir Putin
Sergey Lavrov	February 24, 2004	Incumbent	United Russia	Fradkov II	Vladimir Putin
Sergey Lavrov	February 24, 2004	Incumbent	United Russia	Zubkov	Vladimir Putin
Sergey Lavrov	February 24, 2004	Incumbent	United Russia	Putin II	Dmitry Medvedev
Sergey Lavrov	February 24, 2004	Incumbent	United Russia	Medvedev I	Vladimir Putin
Sergey Lavrov	February 24, 2004	Incumbent	United Russia	Medvedev II	Vladimir Putin
Sergey Lavrov	February 24, 2004	Incumbent	United Russia	Mishustin I	Vladimir Putin
Sergey Lavrov	February 24, 2004	Incumbent	United Russia	Mishustin II	Vladimir Putin

== See also ==
- Ministry of Foreign Affairs (Russia)
- List of Soviet foreign ministers
- Ministry of Foreign Affairs (Soviet Union)
