= Fyodor Sheremetev =

Russian statesman

Fyodor Ivanovich Sheremetev (Russian: Фёдор Ива́нович Шереме́тев, c. 1570–1650) was a Russian statesman in Tsar Mikhail's times, head of government in 1613–18 and 1642–46.

== Life ==
Sheremetev descended from the same old Moscow milieu as the Romanovs; he was their relative and supporter. In 1605 he was made a boyar by False Dmitry I, in 1610 became one of the so-called Seven Boyars - a self-appointed provisional government.

Sheremetev took an active part in the Zemsky Sobor of 1613; he's ascribed famous words (in a letter to prince Golitsyn, perhaps apocryphal): "Let's elect Misha Romanov, he is young and stupid, he will be obedient to us". Since 1613 he was informal head of government.

In 1618 took part in bringing forth Treaty of Deulino. Patriarch Filaret, after his return from captivity in 1619, pushed Sheremetev aside from state affairs, for the latter disapproved Filaret's straightforward anti-Polish policy. After Filaret's death in 1633 Sheremetev came back to politics. In 1634 he was a head of Russian delegation (together with Alexey Lvov) in Russo-Polish negotiations and signed the Treaty of Polyanovka.

After Ivan Cherkassky's death in 1642 Sheremetev was appointed head of Russian government, but his power was feeble: court marshal Alexey Lvov had more influence, and Sheremetev was disliked by Prikaz dyaks. His weak position was reflected in a contemporary chronicler's remark: "This Fedor was evil-tempered and unskillful in affairs".

In 1646, as Boris Morozov came to power, Sheremetev retired.
