= Moscow Uprising =

Moscow Uprising may refer to several events that took place in Moscow, Russia:

- Moscow Uprising of 1382, also known as the Siege of Moscow
- Moscow Uprising of 1547, following the Fire of Moscow
- Moscow Uprising of 1612 during the Time of Troubles and Polish–Muscovite War (1605–18)
- Moscow Uprising of 1648, also known as the Salt Riot
- Moscow Uprising of 1662, also known as the Copper Riot
- Moscow Uprising of 1682, also known as the Khovanschina
- Moscow Uprising of 1771, also known as the Plague Riot
- Moscow Uprising of 1905, also known as the December Uprising
- Moscow Bolshevik Uprising of 1917, part of the October Revolution
- Left SR uprising of 1918 against the Bolsheviks
