= Prince Alexey Lvov =

Russian diplomat (1580s–1653/1654)

- Алексей Львов
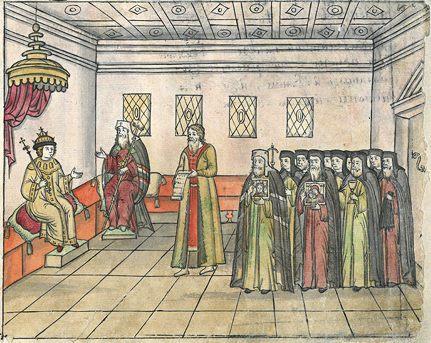
- Lvov in front of Tsar Michael

Ambassador Extraordinary and Plenipotentiary of the Russian Tsardom to the Polish–Lithuanian Commonwealth
- In office 1644–1647
- Monarch: Michael of Russia

Prince Alexey Mikhaylovich Lvov (Russian: Алексей Михайлович Львов; 1580s – 1653/1654) was a Russian boyar and diplomat. He was one of the most influential members of Michael of Russia's government.

== Career ==
Lvov began his career as a deputy governor of Nizhny Novgorod (1610), Rylsk (1615), and Astrakhan (1618–20). In 1621, he was sent to the court of Danish king Christian IV with the tsar's proposition to marry one of Christian's nieces, the Schleswig-Holsteinian princesses, but the mission failed completely. After his return, he was made a deputy chief of the domestic department (Pomestny prikaz).

In 1634, Lvov was one of two heads of Russian delegation in Russo-Polish negotiations which resulted in signing the Treaty of Polyanovka. After this success, he was sent to Poland in 1635 as a head of an embassy to witness Władysław IV Vasa's oath of "eternal peace". In 1644, he once again went to Poland as Ambassador Plenipotentiary.

In 1644, Lvov and Boris Morozov became main opponents of Tsar Mikhail's plan to marry his daughter Irina to Dutch prince Valdemar Christian (they feared this marriage would generate an independent center of power). Finally, in 1645, they have managed to ruin it after a lot of intrigue.

In January 1626, Lvov was appointed to serve as a majordomo of the tsar's court. In 1627, was made an okolnichy and official head of the Prikaz Bolshogo dvortsa, a government office dealing with the tsar's palace economy and judging monasteries. Due to his efforts, this post was gradually turned into a place of great significance. After Ivan Cherkassky's death in 1642, it was actually Lvov who might be called a tsar's "chancellor", not weak and despised nominal head of government Fedor Sheremetev, Lvov's close friend. After 1645, he shared power with Boris Morozov. In 1647, Lvov retired.

== Sources ==
- Андреев И. Алексей Михайлович. М., 2003
