= Lvov princely family =

Russian princely family

The Lvov Coat of Arms

The House of Lvov (Russian: Львов) is a princely Russian family of Rurikid stock. The family is descended from the princes (knyazes) of Yaroslavl where early members of the family are buried.

== Notable members ==
- Knyaz Matvey Danilovich (died 1603), Voivod in Tobolsk (1592) and in Verkhoturye (1601)
- Knyaz Ivan Dimitriyevich, Voivod in Tyumen (1635–1639)
- Knyaz Alexey Mikhaylovich (died 1653), Stolnik (1613), Okolnichiy (1627–), Boyar (1635) and head of the 'Prikaz of the Great Palace' (that is, a court marshal)
- Knyaz Dmitry Petrovich (died 1660), Boyar (1655)
- Knyaz Nikita Yakovlevich (died 1670), Okolnichiy and head of the Yamskoy Prikaz (the earliest version of the Russian Post Office, see prikaz)
- Knyaz Mikhail Nikitich (died 1692), Boyar (1692)
- Knyaz Vladimir Vladimirovich (1834–1865), writer
- Knyaz Georgy Yevgenyevich (1861–1925) (32nd generation Rurikid), Russian Prime Minister
- Knyaz Alexander Dimitriyevich (1863–1922), Fire-Brigade founder, Petergof Zemstvo chairman, cousin of Georgy Yevgenyevich
- Knyaz Pavel Dmitriyevich Lvov (1864-1919), civil servant and patron of ballet. He was a patron and lover of the dancer Vaslav Nijinsky.
