= Salt tax =

Tax on common salt

The taxation of salt one of the longest-standing sources of revenue for governments, due to the vital role of salt in the human diet. Salt taxes date as far back as 300 BC, and salt has been a valuable good used for gifts and religious offerings at least since 6050 BC. Salt was first taxed in China, and later notably also in France, Spain, Russia, England, and India. The late Roman Empire began monopolising salt in order to fund war. Salt was such an important commodity during the Middle Ages that salt production facilities became some of the first state-owned enterprises. Salt taxes have contributed to many political and economic revolts, such as the French Revolution, the Moscow Salt Riot, the Salt March in India, and the Salt Tax Revolt in Spain.

== Timeline ==
- 6050 BC – Salt used as part of Egyptian religious offerings and valuable trade between the Phoenicians and their Mediterranean empire
- 800 BC – First salt tax levied in China.
- 485 AD – English fish salting became popular
- 1360 – First salt tax implemented in France
- 1540 - Salt War in Perugia, Italy
- 1631 – Salt Tax Revolt begins in Biscay
- 1634 – Salt Tax Revolt in Biscay crushed as main advocates were executed
- 1648 – Moscow uprising caused by salt tax implementation
- 1693 – William III implements salt tax in England
- 1696 – The salt tax in England was doubled in order to increase revenue
- 1790 – Post French revolution, salt tax was abolished
- 1806 – Napoleon Bonaparte reinstated the Gabelle in France
- 1825 – Abolishment of the salt tax in England
- 1835 – First salt taxes were implemented in India, originally placed by the British East India Company
- 1858 – The British crown took over the administration of India
- 1882 – Salt act implemented by the British in India, prohibiting Indians from selling or collecting salt, thus forcing them to purchase the highly taxed salt from British rulers
- 1930 – Mohandas Karamchand Gandhi led the Salt March, part of the Indian independence movement, in protest of the unfair salt tax
- 1945 – The Gabelle was abolished following France's liberation from Nazi Germany
- 1947 – India gains independence from the British Empire as a result of the Indian independence movement.
- 1974 – in Italy the salt tax was abolished.

== Implications of salt tax ==
The implications of the salt tax were both positive and negative. Salt tax was highly profitable for governments and increased the living standards within many countries. The salt tax was also influential upon historic political events including the Salt March in 1930 and the French Revolution in 1790. As a result of the salt tax, the price of salt skyrocketed, subsequently meaning many individuals were unable to afford salt. Salt plays a large role in the human diet and salt starvation is a serious health issue which can result in vomiting, coma, and death. Many believe that populations revolted against the salt tax through the French revolution and the Salt March as a result of the deaths associated with the lack of salt and high level of social disruption the tax caused. The Moscow Uprising and the Salt Tax Revolt had the highest death tolls and caused the most significant social disruption, however these salt taxations were quickly removed as a result.

== Impacted regions ==
=== India ===
Today, India is one of the leading producers of salt in the world, coming in third behind the US and China. There were many forms of salt taxation across the Indian Subcontinent, including the Mughals who taxed salt in Bengal, with Hindus paying a 5% tax and Muslims paying 2.5%. However, the British implementation of the salt tax in India was one of the highest of its kind. In 1835, the British East India Company implemented its first taxation of salt in India, the British East India Company was taken over by the crown in 1858 as a result of the plentiful revenue. Due to India's large population, not everyone was able to afford salt thus often resulting in salt deprivation, many Indians died as a result of the expensive salt taxation, this and other surrounding political problems influenced the Salt March in 1930. The Salt March led by Mahatma Gandhi was a protest in response to the unfair tax and standing up to the rule of the British Monarch, the protest resulted in the independence of India in 1947.

=== England ===
During the Commonwealth period, the previously abolished salt tax was reintroduced in 1641. However, the tax was revoked in 1660 and not reinstated until 1693 under the reign of William III. The tax was originally set at two shillings a bushel on foreign salt, one shilling on native salt. However, in 1696 this was doubled and remained until it was abolished in 1825. Salt tax was collected by over 600 officials at the time. The British salt tax was abolished in 1825 as a result of salt becoming an important mineral in the manufacturing processes evolving during the Industrial Revolution. Much of the impetus behind the repeal of salt duties came from manufacturers wanting to produce sodium carbonate from common salt through the Leblanc process, rather than extracting it from marine plants such as kelp or barilla.

=== China ===
Salt taxation in China dates back to 300 BC, and today China is one of the largest producers of salt in the world. Salt tax has played a large role in Chinese history and their economic development, as salt is considered an essential commodity, it is also one of their largest sources of government revenue. Private salt trafficking was very common in China as monopoly salt was more expensive and lower quality.

=== France ===
The Gabelle was the French salt tax, initially implemented in 1360 and lasting, with brief revisions and lapses, until 1946. The Gabelle originated as an indirect tax on agricultural commodities; however, from 1360 onward it was limited solely to the taxation of salt implemented by the French crown. The Gabelle was one of the most unequal forms of revenue generation in the country's history, and was one of the main injustices of the French peasants, as the tax was based on one's social class, so small farmers and poorer urban people were the most affected by the taxation of salt. Salt smuggling was extremely common in France due to the nature of the tax, as smugglers could buy salt in an area where it was cheap and sell it in an area where the legal price of salt was much higher. The Gabelle is said to have been a large contributing factor to the French Revolution.

=== Roman Empire ===
Within the Roman Empire, salt was considered a fundamental part of empire building. The first of the great Roman Empire roads, the Via Salaria or Salt Road, was built for transporting salt. The Roman army required salt for their soldiers and horses. The Roman government did not maintain a monopoly of salt. The Roman government did control salt prices when they felt it necessary, and they often subsidised the price of salt to ensure commoners were able to access salt. In order to finance wars, the government did begin manipulating prices of salt in order to raise funds, despite this there remained a low price within the city of Rome.

== Tax avoidance ==
Avoiding the high taxation of salt, many individuals smuggled salt in order to provide their families with salt and make profits of their own. Private salt trafficking occurred as monopoly salt was more expensive and of lower quality whilst local bandits and rebel leaders thrived on salt smuggling in both China and France. Smuggling salt was a very serious offence, individuals in French history were executed for salt-smuggling whilst in China offenders were often flayed alive. Whilst the tax remained in England, salt smuggling between Ireland and England was extremely common as Ireland had no salt tax thus Irish salt was smuggled into England.

== Tax resistance ==
Tax resistance is the universal refusal to pay tax due to an opposition to the government that is imposing that tax, it is a direct action and if in violation of the tax regulations can be seen as civil disobedience. Tax resisters may accept that law commands them to pay taxes however they choose to resist taxation. The Salt March led by Mohandas Gandhi is a prime example of tax resistance and is one of the most recognisable tax resistances in history.

== Salt Tax Revolt ==
Between 1631 and 1634 the Salt Tax Revolt took place within the Spanish province of Biscay. The revolt was in response to economic conflict concerning the price and ownership of salt. The Revolt consisted of several violent incidents opposing Philip IV's taxation policy. The rebellion against the salt tax quickly progressed into a much broader protest against all economic inequalities under Philip IV's reign. The rebellion came to an end in the spring of 1634 as the main leaders of the protest were executed. However, Philip IV overlooked the rest of the group and decided to remove his original order concerning the price and ownership of salt in response to the rebellion.

== The Moscow Salt Riot ==
In 1648 the Moscow Uprising, more commonly known as the Salt Riot began as a result of government implementation of a universal salt tax, replacing other taxes, with the intention of replenishing the state treasury. The price of salt grew exponentially resulting in violent riots within Moscow. The Salt Tax fell mainly on the poorer sections within society, the riot was aggravated due to members of the elite finding ways to evade the tax, resulting in widespread corruption.

== Examples ==
Notable examples of salt taxation throughout history include:

- The French Gabelle, which was a contributing factor to the French Revolution.
- Salt tax in China: at various times including that under the Salt Commission of Tang and Yuan China. In China, a state monopoly on salt, also known as the salt gabelle, has existed since 119 B.C and lasted until 2014, making it the world's oldest (and possibly first) state monopoly in the world. By the mid-Tang dynasty, taxes on salt brought in more than half of the government's tax revenue, and continued to be a major factor even in the 20th century.
- The salt tax in India including that under the British. In India, there had been a tax on salt for hundreds of years but it was greatly increased following the rule of India's provinces by the British East India Company. In salt producing regions such as Orissa, private sale of salt was prohibited, and salt found being transported had to be sold to the British authorities at a fixed price, and, in later years, the production of salt was banned completely. This was done to maintain the high price of British salt by destroying India's long-established tradition of salt-making. In 1858, when Britain took control of the Indian provinces, these taxes remained. Mahatma Gandhi protested this with the Salt March, and it was a contributing factor to the Indian independence movement. Salt played a large role in India's quest for independence. In 1930, Mahatma Gandhi’s famous Salt Satyagraha took place and led to nonviolent protests throughout the provinces of British India. A 24-day, 240-mile march from Sabarmati Ashram to the coastal village of Dandi, Gandhi was going to, at the journey’s end, illegally harvest salt without paying tax to the British Crown. Salt was chosen by Gandhi because its taxation was extremely detrimental to the poorest of Indians and, "Next to air and water, salt is perhaps the greatest necessity of life." Despite the national influence and international recognition gained by the Salt Satyagraha, the salt tax remained until it was repealed by Jawaharlal Nehru, the Prime Minister of the Interim Government, in 1946.
- A Russian salt tax led to an uprising known as the Moscow uprising of 1648.
- The solărit tax in the Principality of Moldavia during the 16th-18th century.

== Salt tax in alternate form ==
In 2014, it is still illegal in certain provinces of China to use salt from a neighbor city.
