= Ilya Miloslavsky =

Russian boyar and diplomat

Ilya Danilovich Miloslavsky (Russian: Илья Данилович Милославский; 1594–1668) was a Russian boyar and diplomat.

== Biography ==
Ilya Miloslavsky was brought forward by the head of the Posolsky Prikaz Ivan Gramotin, who had been his uncle. Miloslavsky was soon sent to Constantinople with a message from Tsar Alexei Mikhailovich, who wanted to establish a cordial relationship with the Turkish Sultan. In 1646, Miloslavsky went to the Netherlands with orders to select gunsmiths for a Russian weapons factory and invite foreign officers and soldiers to serve in Russia.

When Alexei Mikhailovich married his daughter Maria, Miloslavsky, as the tsar's father-in-law, began to play a more visible role at the royal court. During the Polish campaigns of 1654–1655, he was appointed court voyevoda. In 1656–1662, Miloslavsky was in charge of the Streltsy Prikaz, Treasury Prikaz, Inozemsky Prikaz, and Reiter Prikaz. His foreign contemporaries considered him a self-interested and dull-witted individual.

According to an Austrian diplomat Augustin Meyerberg (author of Journey to the Muscovy), the tsar did not respect Miloslavsky, never called him his father-in-law, and even pulled him by the hair and hit him with his fist on several occasions. Miloslavsky and his family occupied the Amusement Palace in the Moscow Kremlin until his death in 1668.
