= Copper Riot =

Moscow riot on 25 July (O.S.)/4 August 1662

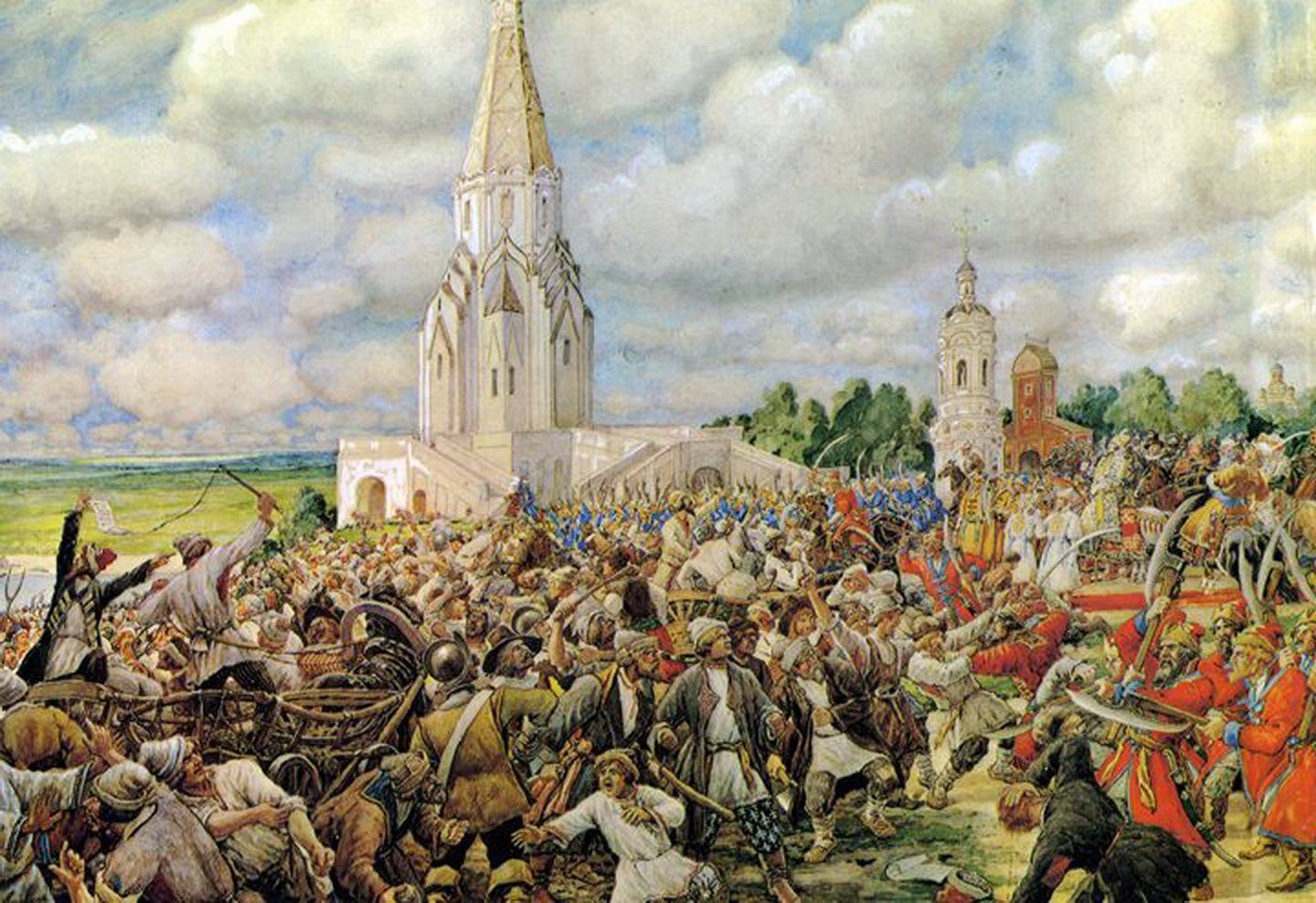
Copper Riot 1662. (Ernst Lissner, 1938).

The Copper Coin Riot, also known as the Moscow Uprising of 1662 (Russian: Медный бунт, Московское восстание 1662 года) was a major riot in Moscow, which took place on 4 August [O.S. 25 July] 1662.

== Background ==
The riot was preceded by a gradual deterioration of Moscow's economy because of the Northern War with Poland and Sweden and a sharp rise in taxes. In 1654, the Russian government decided to begin issuing copper money in large quantities and equated them with silver money. The measure caused the devaluation of copper money, which led to price inflation of staple goods and the mass production of counterfeit copper money with the involvement of some top officials. By 1662, Russia had already been experiencing an acute financial crisis.

A few days before the riot, there had already been rumours on the so-called vorovskiye listki (воровские листки, or black lists), which contained the names of those responsible for economic misfortunes. The lists suddenly appeared posted in several areas of Moscow during the night of 25 July. They included the names of the "traitors", such as boyar Miloslavsky, okolnichys Fyodor Rtishchev and Bogdan Khitrovo, diak D.M. Bashmakov, merchants V.G. Shorin, S. Zadorin and others. Those people were accused of causing economic collapse following the introduction of copper money and of having secret ties with Poland.

== Riot ==
The riot began early on the morning of 25 July and continued until the afternoon. Up to 10,000 people took part in the civil unrest, mostly Muscovites (posads, soldiers, reiters, some of the streltsy from the Moscow garrison, kholops and peasants). After they read out their proclamation, the insurgents made their way to Kolomenskoye to meet with Tsar Alexis I of Russia. They demanded the surrender of "traitors" to the people and the taking of steps to stabilise the economy. The Tsar and the boyars promised to lower the taxes and conduct an investigation in accordance with the demands of the petition and the proclamation presented by the angry crowd. The insurgents believed the Tsar's promises, and rushed back to Moscow, where rioters, meanwhile, had been destroying the residences of the most hated merchants. After meeting halfway between Moscow and Kolomenskoye, both groups of insurgents went back to the tsar’s residence to stand their ground. When they reached Kolomenskoye, a large military force of 6,000 to 10,000 soldiers had already been assembled to counter the rebels.

== Suppression ==
The Tsar ordered a merciless suppression of the unrest. As a result, up to 1,000 men were killed, hanged or drowned in the Moscow River. Several thousand people were arrested and later exiled after a brutal investigation.

== Aftermath ==
The Copper Riot had lasted for only a day but caused perplexity and fear for top government officials. In 1663, copper coinage was abolished.

== See also ==
- Plague Riot
- Salt Riot
