= Yemelyan Ukraintsev =

Russian diplomat and statesman

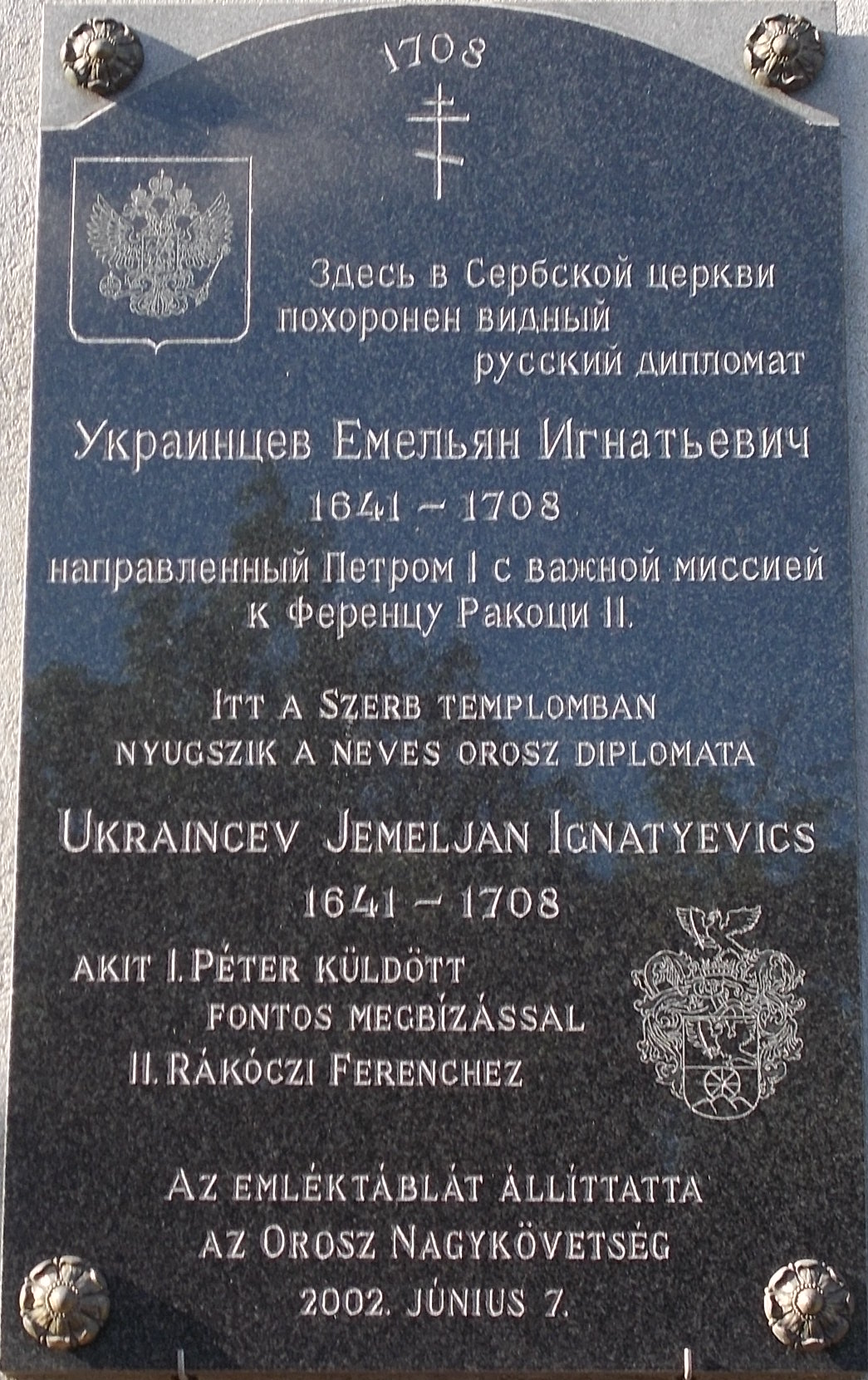
Grave plaque at Saint Nicholas Church, Eger, Hungary

Yemelyan Ignatievich Ukraintsev (Russian: Емелья́н Игна́тьевич Украи́нцев; September 12 or 23, 1641–1708) was a Russian diplomat and statesman.

Ukraintsev started his career in civil service in 1660 as a podyachy (подьячий; hypodiakonos from Greek means "assistant servant") in the Posolsky Prikaz (Diplomacy Department). He served under the supervision of Afanasy Ordin-Nashchokin, which whom he would go on a diplomatic mission to Warsaw in 1662-1663. Ukraintsev took part in signing the Treaty of Andrusovo with Poland in 1667. In 1672-1673, he was sent as an envoy to Sweden, Denmark, and the Netherlands, where Ukraintsev conducted negotiations regarding these countries' participation in military campaigns against Turkey. When Artamon Matveev fell into disgrace in 1676, Ukraintsev unofficially took charge of the Posolsky Prikaz. In 1677, he was sent to Warsaw as a second ambassador. In 1679, Ukraintsev met with Hetman Ivan Samoylovych to negotiate joint military action against the Turks. Ironically, he also participated in Samoylovych's deposition during the Crimean campaigns in 1687.

In 1686, Ukraintsev took part in signing the Eternal Peace Treaty with Poland. In 1689, Ukraintsev and Vasily Galitzine (then head of the Posolsky Prikaz) had to flee from the Crimean Tatars. After Galitzine's deposition, Yemelyan Ukraintsev joined his opponents and officially took charge of the Posolsky Prikaz, keeping this post for ensuing ten years.

In 1699, he was appointed ambassador to Constantinople, where he would manage to sign a 30-year peace treaty with the Porte on favorable conditions on July 3, 1700 (Treaty of Constantinople). Upon his return from Turkey, Ukraintsev was appointed head of the Proviantsky Prikaz (Provisions Department). He kept this post until 1706, when he was accused of misuse, subjected to corporal punishment, and fined. Another historical account claims that Ukraintsev was also forced to make mantles and 1400 hats for the Preobrazhensky and Semyonovsky regiments. Despite this incident, his diplomatic career continued. In 1707-1708, Ukraintsev was appointed ambassador to Poland together with Prince Vasily Lukich Dolgorukov.

Ukraintsev died in 1708 at Eger while on a mission to Hungary to reconcile Duke Francis II Rákóczi with the Holy Roman Emperor Joseph I.
