= Moscow uprising of 1648 =

Civil disturbance in Russia

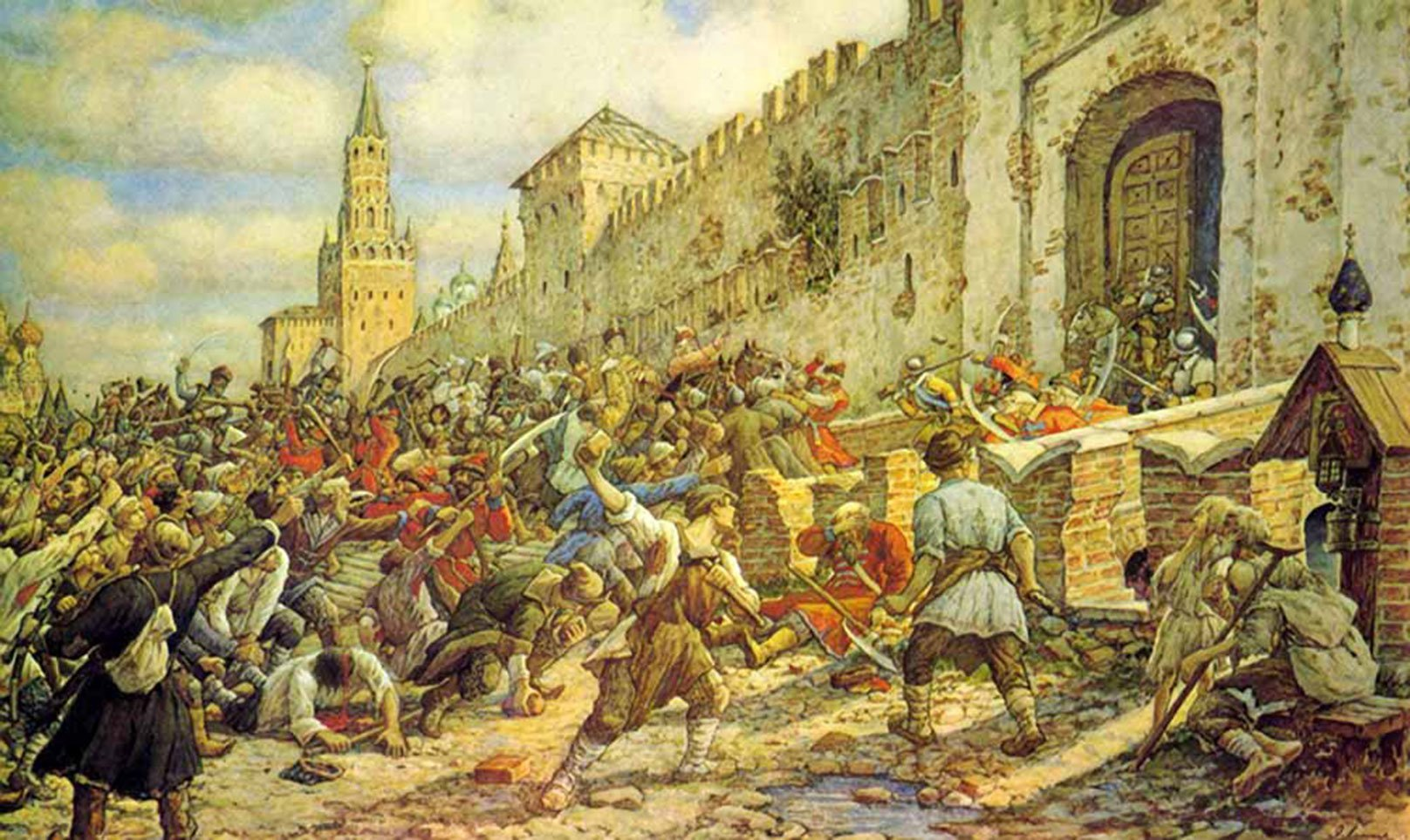
Salt Riot on Red Square, by Ernest Lissner

The Moscow uprising of 1648 (Russian: Соляной бунт, Московское восстание 1648), sometimes known as the salt riot, started because of the government's replacement of different taxes with a universal salt tax for the purpose of replenishing the state treasury after the Time of Troubles. This drove up the price of salt, leading to violent riots in the streets of Moscow. The riot was an early challenge to the reign of Alexei I, eventually resulting in the exile of Alexei's advisor Boris Morozov.

== Background ==
The taxes fell mostly onto artisans and serfs who were unable to pay the increased price. Furthermore, many townsmen and boyars developed ways to evade taxation, thus placing an even higher burden on those less able to cheat the system. This created resentment among the townspeople, expediting their desire for tax reform. The addition of the salt tax, which increased the price of salt, hit hardest of all because salted fish was an important part of the Russian diet at the time.

A second major complaint came from the poorer landed boyars who wanted to reclaim escaped serfs. Serfs fled their estates due to cruelty from their masters, but more frequently because of bad soil. In the Northern reaches of the kingdom, the ground stayed frozen for most of the year leading to weaker yields when compared to fields on Southern estates. Richer boyars enticed agriculturally minded peasants off of the small estates with the promise of better soil and stronger crops. Boyar livelihood and land holding status depended almost entirely on the productivity of their land. When laborers left, productivity invariably dropped, threatening the landed status of the boyar and leading to discontent among the elite. Up until the uprising, a statute of limitations constricted the amount of time boyars had to reclaim "lost souls." The lesser boyars wanted this policy rescinded so that they could reclaim serfs at any point, thus securing their landed status. The riot solidified serfdom in Russia by lifting the repatriation time limit, binding serfs to an estate with more permanence.

Besides taxation, Muscovites were fed up with widespread corruption at the local scale. The worst offender was Leontiy Stepanovich Plescheyev, the governor of Moscow. In their petition, the people claimed, "...that from him the taxpaying community suffered heavy taxes and they were groundlessly charged with all sorts of robberies and thefts of his, Levontii's, instruction." Among the Tsar's advisors, Boris Morozov, the man who orchestrated the bureaucratization of the government, kindled outrage among the populace. Russians were strongly tied to tradition and feared they would lose their long-cherished personal connection to the Tsar. While the Tsar remained ever pure in the eyes of the people, popular opinion held that his advisors exercised an evil influence over him. As the rioters told Alexei I, Morozov and his cronies are turning "your Tsarist Majesty against the people, and the people against your Tsarist Majesty." They resented Morozov for usurping power from the divinely appointed Alexei and for changing the established system.

== Start of riot ==
All these problems came to a head on 1 June 1648, upon Alexei I's return to Moscow from the Troitse-Sergiyeva Lavra monastery. A crowd of Muscovites surrounded the Tsar and complained about the boyars and prikaz officials. Instead of hearing the petition, the royal bodyguards started dispersing the crowd, pushing them away from the Tsar. This unexpected reaction caused a major outbreak of anger among the people. On 2 June the insurgents burst into the Moscow Kremlin and demanded the surrender of Leontii Pleshcheyev (head of Zemsky Prikaz and Moscow police department), Duma diak Nazar Chistoy (salt tax initiator), boyar Boris Morozov (actual head of government) and his brother-in-law Pyotr Trakhaniotov (head of Cannon Prikaz). Morozov commanded the Streltsy (musketeers) to drive the rioters out of the Kremlin, but they refused. When not acting as the Tsar's bodyguards, the musketeers held artisanal jobs in Moscow. This conflict of interest led them to side with the plight of the townsmen, stating that they, "...did not want to stand in antagonistic relations with the crowd for the sake of the traitor and tyrant Pleshcheyev."

The people would not hear the Tsar's heartfelt pleas to spare Pleshceyev and, on June 3, Alexei surrendered the official. In their fervor, the crowd did not wait for Pleshcheyev to be executed instead, "...they cuggeled him so black and blue and with axes they cut him asunder like a fish, the pieces they let lie naked here and there". The rebels set fire to the White City and Kitai-gorod. They burned between 15,000 and 24,000 houses; between 1700 and 2000 people died in the riot. The rioters split into two groups to target the most hated boyars, diaks, okolnichys, and merchants, killing Nazar Chistoy as he begged for mercy. When rumors spread that Morozov's men had started the fires to antagonize the rioters, the boyar head hunt gained greater momentum.

== Second phase of riot ==
On 6 June, after receiving a promised salary increase, the Streltsy withdrew from their active role in the riot. On June 11, Alexei managed to convince the people to allow Morozov to be exiled to the Kirillo-Belozersky monastery. As the ashes settled, and half of Moscow lay in ruin, the riot gradually dissipated. Soon, however, the provincial nobility, big merchants, and top townsmen seized the initiative and came out with a petition demanding the convocation of the zemsky sobor, or Assembly of the Land, to discuss salary distribution, time limits for recovering escaped serfs, and other legalities. However, the Assembly lacked the voices of the serfs, leading to the institutionalism of serfdom instead of granting them concessions. Upon Morozov's removal, Alexei appointed a new boyar group led by Prince Yakov Cherkassky and boyar Nikita Romanov. They began distributing money, lands and souls to the dvoryane and made a few concessions to the remaining rebels, including the postponement of collection of arrears on 12 June. The government's measures widened the split among the rebels, leading to the arrest and execution of many of the leaders of the uprising on July 3. On 22 October, Boris Morozov secretly returned to Moscow under Alexei's order, and resumed his position as the head of the Russian government, relieving Nikita Romanov of the post. Thus, the immediate outcomes of the riot reversed themselves, and the old order became solidified in an official legal code.

== Aftermath ==
The uprising in Moscow sparked sporadic riots elsewhere in Russia. Most of these happened in southwestern fortress towns where the population consisted of runaway serfs and people of low birth. They enlisted into state service in order to better their lot within society and feared unfavorable reforms by the government. Changes in military organization and obligation could result in their social regression placing them back into indentured servitude. The most significant outcome of the riot was the Assembly of the Land. Through it, a legal code formed that would be used for centuries to come. Representatives of nearly all social levels codified many of the reforms Alexei's administration had been implementing since the beginning of his reign. Significantly, the Sobornoye Ulozheniye made escape virtually impossible for serfs. In order to spread the ratified laws through the country, Alexei had the first major printing press in Russia installed in Moscow.

== See also ==
- Copper Riot
- Moscow plague riot of 1771
- List of food riots
