= Artamon Matveyev =

Russian statesman and diplomat (1625–1682)

- Артамон Матвеев
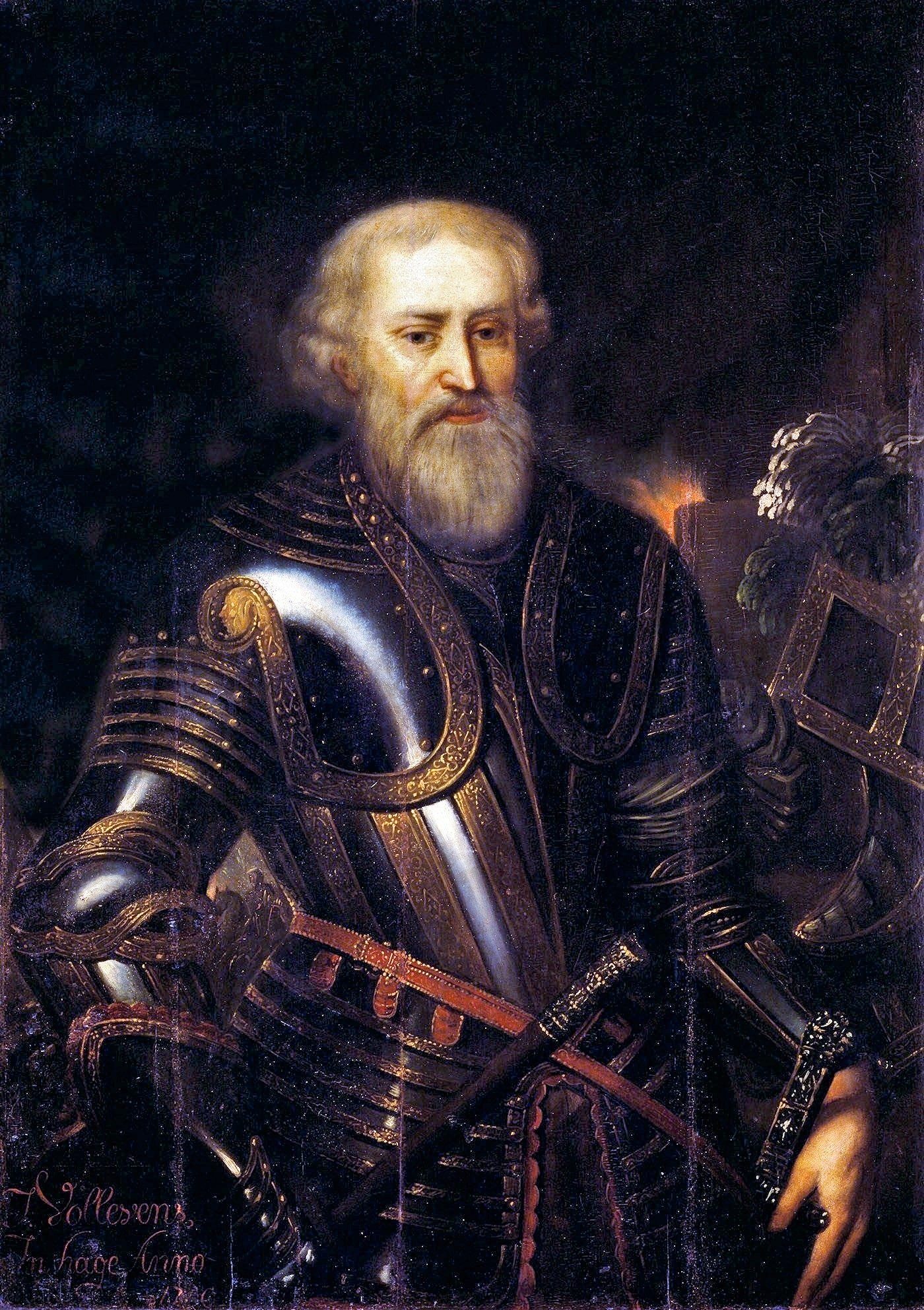
- Posthumous portrait, c. 1700

Head of the Posolsky prikaz
- In office 1671–1676
- Preceded by: Afanasy Ordin-Nashchokin
- Succeeded by: Larion Ivanov

Personal details
- Born: 23 April [O.S. 13 August] 1625 Moscow, Russia
- Died: 25 May [O.S. 15 May] 1685 (aged 60) Moscow, Russia
- Children: 2, including Andrey

Artamon Sergeyevich Matveyev (Russian: Артамо́н Серге́евич Матве́ев; 23 April [O.S. 13 April] 1625 – 25 May [O.S. 15 May] 1682) was a Russian statesman, diplomat and reformer. He served as the head (dyak) of the foreign ministry (Posolsky prikaz) from 1671 to 1676 during the reign of Alexis of Russia, succeeding Afanasy Ordin-Nashchokin.

== Biography ==
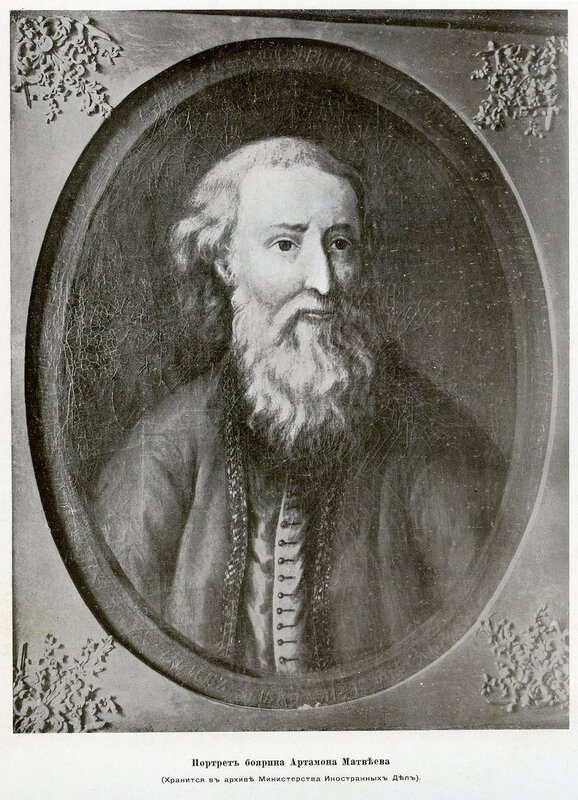
Portrait of Matveyev, 1670s

Because his father, Sergey Matveyev, was a notable diplomat, Artamon Matveyev was brought up at the royal court since the age of 13, where he would become close friends with Alexius I. Matveyev started his career as a government official, who worked in Ukraine and took part in some of Russia's wars with Poland. He was a member of the Russian delegation at the conclusion of the Treaty of Pereyaslav in 1654 and Russian diplomatic mission to Poland in 1656–1657. As the head of the Streletsky prikaz, Matveyev participated in suppression of the Copper Riot in 1662. Seven years later, he was put in charge of the Malorossiysky prikaz, and in 1671, the head of the Posolsky prikaz (foreign ministry) and other ministries. Matveyev was known to have considered unification of Ukraine and Russia as the most important issue of the Russian foreign policy. He once said that it was even possible to temporarily forget about the struggle with the Swedes for the Baltic Sea for the sake of unification with Ukraine. In 1672, Matveyev managed to secure Kiev for Russia during the talks with Poland.

After Matveev had become head of the Little Russian Chancellery in 1669 and after the death of the tsar's first consort Maria Miloslavskaya, tsar Alexis visited the house of Matveev to meet prospective brides. Here Alexis also met Natalia Naryshkina, whom he married on 22 January 1671. Matveev had 'sponsored' several young ladies at his house, including Natalia. She was put forward due to her family connections as her brothers were subordinant officers in Matveev's musketeer regiments. At the end of the year Matveyev was raised to the rank of okolnichy, and on 1 September 1674 attained the still higher dignity of boyar. The deplorable physical condition of Alexius's immediate successor, Feodor III, suggested to Matveyev the desirability of elevating to the throne the sturdy little tsarevich Peter, then in his fourth year. He purchased the allegiance of the Streltsy and then, summoning the boyars of the council, earnestly represented to them that Feodor was unable to reign and urged the substitution of little Peter. But the reactionary boyars, among whom were the near kinsmen of Feodor, proclaimed him tsar and Matveyev was banished to Pustozyorsk, where he remained until Feodor's death on 7 May 1682. Immediately afterwards Peter was proclaimed tsar by Patriarch Joachim, and the first ukaz issued in Peter's name summoned Matveyev to return to the capital and act as chief adviser to the tsaritsa Natalia. Matveyev came to Moscow on 11 May, and four days later had to meet with the rebellious Streltsy, who had been instigated to rebel by the anti-Petrine faction. He had already succeeded in partially pacifying them, when one of their colonels began to abuse the still hesitating and suspicious musketeers. Infuriated, they seized Matveyev and hacked him to pieces.

Matveyev was a very educated and versatile individual for his time. He organized a publishing house on the premises of the Posolsky Prikaz and compiled the so-called Tsarsky titulyarnik (Царский титулярник), an illustrated reference book about titles of the Russian tsar and foreign rulers, with some information on Russian history, pictures of different coats of arms, stamps, monarchs and patriarchs. Matveyev was also a collector of rare books and had a huge library. He decorated his house with pieces of fine art, optical devices and models of different ships. Matveyev was the one to introduce theater to the court by organizing a group of actors guided by George Hüfner who staged various plays. He was also one of the organizers of the first apothecary in Moscow. His son Andrey Matveev was made a count and served as the first President of Justice Collegium.
