= Ivan Cherkassky =

Russian statesman

Prince Ivan Borisovich Cherkassky (Rus. Ива́н Бори́сович Черка́сский; c. 1580 – 4 April 1642) was a Russian statesman who served as the head of government for 20 years under his cousin Tsar Mikhail, the first Tsar of the House of Romanov. He was the only son of Boris Kambulatovich Cherkassky and Marfa Nikitichna Romanova, a sister of Patriarch Filaret. In his youth Cherkassky was a friend of Grigory Otrepyev. In 1599 he was arrested together with other prominent members of the Romanovs' party, and was exiled in 1601, but returned to Moscow in 1602.

After Mikhail Romanov was elected to become Tsar of Muscovy in 1613, Ivan Cherkassky was made a boyar. After Filaret's administrative reform in 1619 Cherkassky was put in charge of key ministries: the Treasury in 1621-22, and the Streletsky Prikaz and Aptekarsky Prikaz in 1622-23, making him a de facto head of government. He was also the richest man in Moscow. Isaac Massa, in a 1624 report for the Swedish government, reported that Cherkassky was also the head of the “military council”.

A contemporary in 1634 wrote that Ivan Cherkassky managed affairs competently and didn't allow bureaucratic red tape to interfere with potential petitioners.

Cherkassky was married to Evdokia Vasilievna Morozova, a cousin of Boris Morozov. Adam Olearius mentioned her outstanding beauty. Cherkassky died childless.
