= Tver Address =

Address presented to Tsar Nicholas II of Russia

The Tver Address was an address (a written proposal) presented to Tsar Nicholas II on his accession to the throne in 1894, by the most liberal zemstvo leaders.

The address was inspired by increased wishes for an "all-class zemstvo at the volost level", something the liberal nobles, like Prince Lvov, believed would integrate the peasantry into the local government.

In a subsequent speech the Tsar denounced the ideas as "senseless dreams", while emphasizing his "firm and unflinching" devotion to the "principle of autocracy". The speech infuriated public opinion, and within days the Ministry of the Interior resumed its persecution of the zemstvos.

== Bibliography ==
- Figes, Orlando. A People's Tragedy: The Russian Revolution 1891–1924. London: The Bodley Head. ISBN 9781847922915.
