= Zemgor =

Zemgor (Russian: Земгор or Объединённый комитет Земского союза и Союза городов; literally United Committee of the Union of Zemstvos and the Union of Towns) was a Russian organization created in 1915 to help the government with their efforts in World War I. The first Chairman of the committee was Prince Georgy Lvov, a representative of the Constitutional Democratic party. The organization was disbanded by Bolsheviks in 1919.

While disbanded in Russia, a number of emigrated former functionaries decided to reestablish the organization with the same abbreviated name, Zemgor, and in 1921 it was officially registered in Paris as an organization helping Russian emigrants. Its official names were Российский Земско-городской комитет помощи российским гражданам за границей in Russian and Comite des Zemstvos et Municipalités Russes de Secours des Citoyens russes à l'étranger in French. The first chairman of the Paris organization was Georgy Lvov, then A. I. Konovalov and A. D. Avksentiev. In the beginning of 1920s Zemgor was recognized as the main welfare organization helping Russian emigrants but later went into obscurity.
