= Aptekarsky Prikaz =

The Aptekarsky Prikaz (Pharmaceutical Ministry or Apothecary Ministry) was an imperial Russian prikaz, organized in the second half of the sixteenth century, which nominally dealt with the health care of the Czar and his court, but which in fact took jurisdiction over medicine and healthcare throughout Russia.
