= Pevchy dyak =

Singer in tsar's court or church choir

Pevchy dyak (Russian: певчий дьяк) is a historical name of a singer's occupation in Russia. They were singers at the tsar's court and in church choirs of higher church hierarchs: patriarch, metropolitan, archiereus (bishop of the Eastern Orthodox Church).

== See also ==
- Dyachok
- Dyak
