= Dyachok =

Church occupation

Dyachok is a colloquial name for a category of church worker in Ukrainian and Russian history. The official name was Russian: псаломщик, literally "psalm person". They were laymen, not included in the official hierarchy of church offices. Their duties included giving readings and leading the congregation in song during mass. Their other duties include that of clerk in the church.

== See also ==
- Cantor
- Reader (liturgy)
- Diak (clerk)
- Pevchy dyak
