= Sibirskiy prikaz =

Department of Tsarist Russia

Sibirsky Prikaz
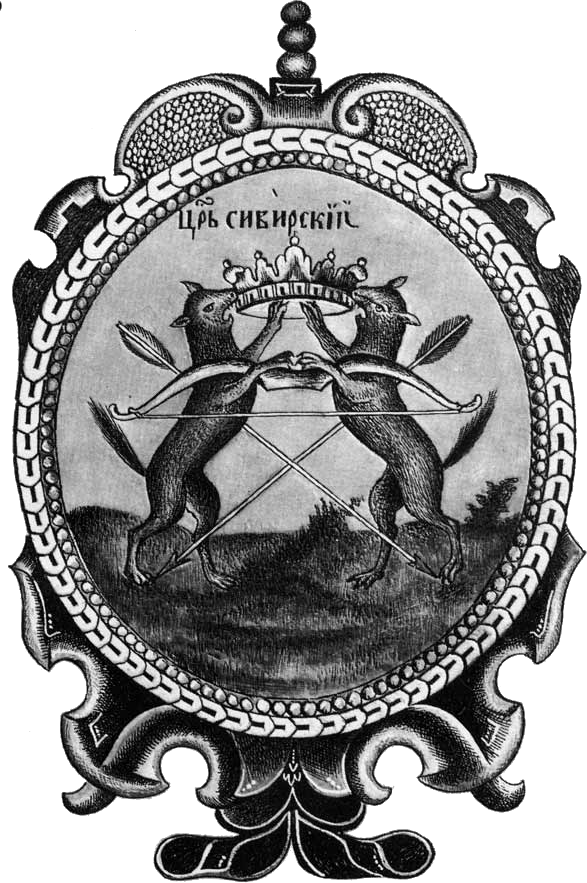

Prikaz overview
- Formed: 1637; 389 years ago
- Dissolved: 1711; 315 years ago
- Jurisdiction: Russia
- Headquarters: Moscow

The Sibirsky prikaz (Russian: Сибирский приказ), also translated as Department of Siberian Affairs, was the prikaz of the Russian central government responsible for Siberian affairs between the 17th and 18th centuries.

== History ==
From 1599 to 1637, the Kazansky prikaz was responsible for the administration of Siberia, which included most of the eastern regions of the Russian state. Due to the growth of the Siberia-related agenda, the Sibirsky prikaz was separated from the Kazansky prikaz in 1637, and until 1663, both were headed by the same administrator. Boris Mikhailovich Lykov-Obolensky was its first administrator.

Local governors (voivodes) were appointed by the Sibirsky prikaz and delegated with a large amount of power: administrative, judicial, police, financial, taxation, military, and if necessary, diplomatic, as many frontier regions directly bordered China and Mongolia.

In 1711, the prikaz was reorganised into the newly established Siberia Governorate. Prince Matvei Petrovich Gagarin was its last administrator.

== See also ==
- History of Siberia
