= Amusement Palace =

Palace in the Kremlin in Moscow, Russia

Coordinates: 55.7512°N 37.6144°E

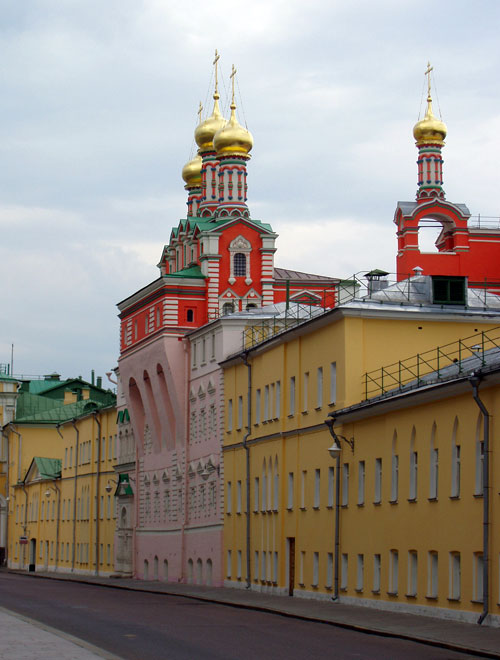
Amusement Palace

The Amusement Palace (Russian: Потешный дворец, romanized: Poteshny dvorets) is located at the Kremlin’s western wall. It is situated between the Commandant and Trinity Towers.

It was built in 1652 for Ilya Miloslavsky, who was the father-in-law of Tsar Alexei Mikhailovich. After the death of Miloslavsky, the palace went to the state. It was then used as a theatre. In the theatre, performances were staged to amuse the family of the tsar and his court. Hence, it got the name the Amusement Palace.

During the administration of Tsar Peter the Great, the Police Department was placed in the palace. In the 19th century the Commandant of Moscow took up his residence there. It was later the home of Joseph Stalin, where his second wife Nadezhda Alliluyeva committed suicide. The palace was restored in 2002–2004, including the original décor of its façade and the Church of our Lady's Glorification.
