= Ambrose of Moscow =

Russian archbishop

- Metropolitan and archbishop of Moscow
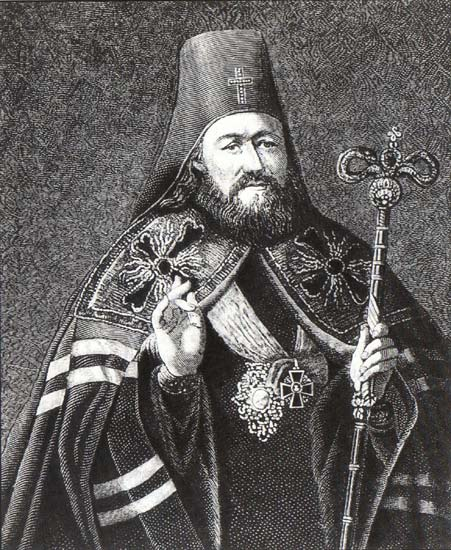
- Church: Russian Orthodox Church
- See: Moscow
- Installed: 1768
- Term ended: 1771
- Predecessor: Timothy, Metropolitan of Moscow
- Successor: Samoel of Krutitsy

Personal details
- Born: 28 October 1708
- Died: 27 September 1771 (aged 62)

Ambrose of Moscow also known as Ambrosius of Moscow (1708-1771) was Archbishop of Moscow who met an untimely death in the hands of a berserk crowd of religious fanatics during the Moscow plague riot of 1771.

Andrey Sertis-Kamensky was born at Nezhin in the government of Chernihiv and studied in the school of St. Alexander Nevsky, where he afterward became a tutor. At the age of thirty-one, he entered a monastery, where he took the name of Ambrose. Subsequently, he was appointed archimandrite of the convent of New Jerusalem at Voskresensk. From this post he was transferred as bishop, first to the diocese of Pereslavl, and afterward to that of Krusitsy near Moscow, finally becoming archbishop of Moscow in 1761. He was famous not only for his interest in schemes for the alleviation of poverty in Moscow but also as the founder of new churches and monasteries. A terrible outbreak of plague occurred in Moscow in 1771, and the populace began to throng round an image of the Virgin Theotokos of Bogolyubovo) to which they attributed supernatural healing power. Ambrose, perceiving that this crowding together merely enabled the contagion to spread, had the image secretly removed. The mob, suspecting that he was responsible for its removal, attacked a monastery to which he had retired, dragged him away from the sanctuary, and, having given him time to receive the sacrament, strangled him.

Ambrose was an author of Russian works that include liturgy and translations from the Fathers in Hebrew. He loved science but challenged "atheistic" and "superstitious" writings.
