= Larion Ivanov =

Russian statesman and diplomat (d. 1682)

- Ларион Иванов

Head of the Posolsky prikaz
- In office 1676–1682
- Preceded by: Artamon Matveyev
- Succeeded by: Vasily Golitsyn

Personal details
- Died: 1682 Moscow, Russia

Larion Ivanovich Ivanov (Russian: Ларион Иванович Иванов; died 1682) was a Russian statesman and diplomat who served as the head (dyak) of the Posolsky prikaz (foreign ministry) from 1676 to 1682. He succeeded Artamon Matveyev at the start of the reign of Feodor III of Russia.

== Career ==
Ivanov served as the head of the Malorossiysky prikaz and was a dyak of the boyar duma during the reign of Alexis of Russia.

He died during the streltsy uprising of 1682; he was succeeded by Vasily Golitsyn.
