= Ivan Gramotin =

Russian diplomat

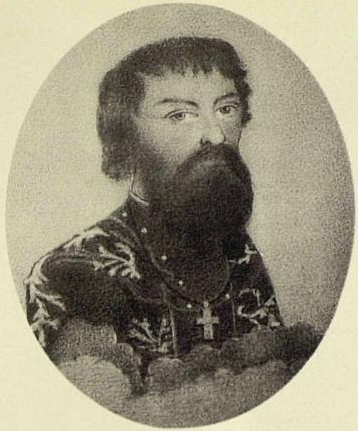
Ivan Tarasyevich Gramotin

Ivan Tarasyevich Gramotin (Russian: Иван Тарасьевич Грамотин) (died 1638) was a Russian diplomat and head of the Posolsky Prikaz (foreign ministry).

Ivan Gramotin was known to have been a very smart, well-read and eloquent person. He was one of the prominent figures during the Time of Troubles in Russia. Gramotin was appointed head of the Posolsky Prikaz in August 1605 during the reign of the False Dmitry I. In 1606, he conducted negotiations with the Polish envoys. Two years later, he betrayed the False Dmitry and tried to become close to Vasily IV of Russia, but eventually failed. In 1608, Ivan Gramotin joined the ranks of the False Dmitry II and became a close associate of Sigismund III Vasa in 1610. After Vasily IV had been admitted to monastic vows, the Polish king appointed Gramotin head of the Posolsky Prikaz in the rank of stamp bearer. He also held a position in the Pomestny Prikaz and the Boyar Duma.

In 1612, Gramotin was sent to Poland by the boyars to negotiate the accession of Wladislaus to the Russian throne. It appears that during his stay in Poland between 1612 and 1617 Gramotin became good friends with the future Russian patriarch Filaret, who had been a prisoner in the hands of the Polish king. In 1618, Gramotin returned to Moscow and kept his previous titles thanks to this friendship. Upon his return to Moscow in 1619, Philaret entrusted Gramotin with important missions, such as negotiations with the Turkish and English ambassadors in 1621-1622 and the case with the Robe of Jesus sent by shah Abbas I of Safavid. In 1626, however, Gramotin was sent into exile to Alatyr at the insistence of Filaret for his intrigues. He was able to return to Moscow only after Filaret's death in 1634 and once again assumed his diplomatic duties.

Ivan Gramotin died as a monk under the name of Joel at Troitse-Sergiyeva Lavra in 1638.
