= Boris Morozov =

Russian statesman and boyar (1590–1661)

Boris Ivanovich Morozov (Russian: Борис Иванович Морозов; 1590 – 1661) was a Russian statesman and boyar who led the Russian government during the early reign of Tsar Alexis. Morozov came from a long noble line, yet was poor before his appointments.

== Life ==
In 1634, when Tsarevich Alexis was five years old, Morozov was appointed as his tutor. This began Morozov's influence on the Russian court and affairs.

On 17 January 1648, Morozov procured the marriage of the tsar with Maria Miloslavskaya, himself marrying her sister, Anna, ten days later, both daughters of Ilya Danilovich Miloslavsky.

During his long career at the Kremlin court, Morozov supervised a number of government departments (called prikazy) – Grand Treasury, Streltsy, Pharmacy, and Payroll. Aspiring to increase the treasury’s income, Morozov reduced salaries of state employees and introduced a high indirect salt tax. These measures caused the Salt Riot of 1648. The rebels demanded Morozov's handover, but the tsar hid him in his palace and then sent him in a fictitious exile into the Kirillo-Belozersky Monastery. After four months, however, Morozov returned to Moscow.

In 1649, Morozov took an active part in preparing the Sobornoye Ulozheniye, a legal code which would survive well into the 19th century. In the early 1650s, while maintaining a low profile, he was still in charge of the Russian government. He owned 55,000 peasants and a number of mills, distilleries, and factories that produced iron, bricks, and salt. His sister-in-law, Boyarynya Morozova, was involved in the Old Believer movement.
