= Georgy Lvov =

Russian aristocrat and politician (1861–1925)

- Георгий Львов
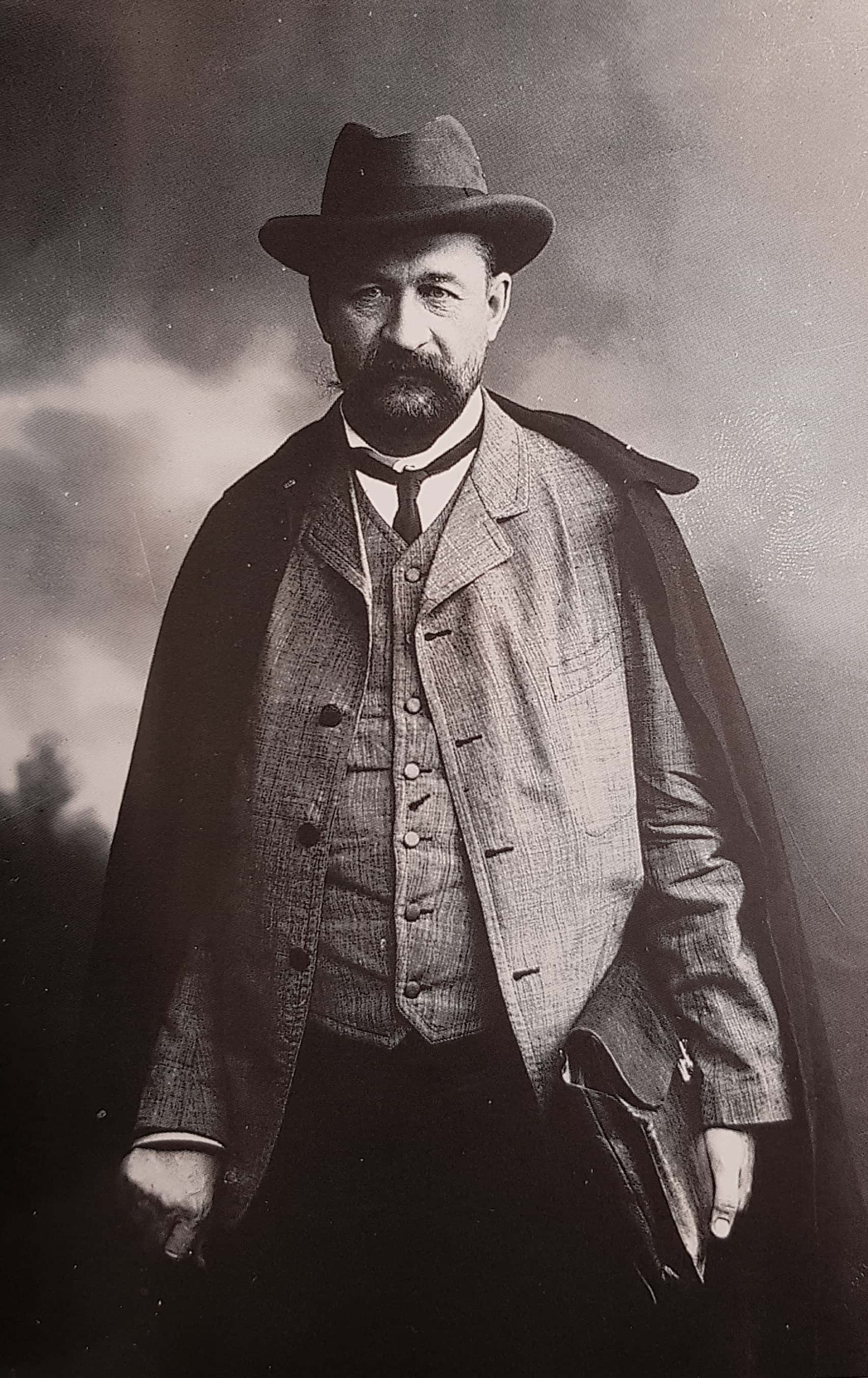
- Georgy Lvov as Prime Minister in March 1917

Minister-Chairman of the Russian Provisional Government (Prime Minister of Russia)
- In office 15 March 1917 – 20 July 1917
- Preceded by: Nikolai Golitsyn (As Prime Minister of the Russian Empire); Nicholas II (As Emperor of Russia)
- Succeeded by: Alexander Kerensky

Minister of the Interior of the Russian Provisional Government
- In office 15 March 1917 – 20 July 1917
- Prime Minister: Himself
- Preceded by: Office established (Note: Alexander Protopopov as Minister of the Interior of the Russian Empire)
- Succeeded by: Irakli Tsereteli

Chief Commissioner of the All-Russian Zemstvo Union
- In office 30 July 1914 – 9 March 1917
- Preceded by: Position established
- Succeeded by: Position abolished

Member of the Russian State Duma
- In office 10 May 1906 – 20 February 1907
- Preceded by: Constituency established
- Succeeded by: Multi-member district
- Constituency: Tula Governorate

Personal details
- Born: Georgy Yevgenyevich Lvov; 2 November 1861 Dresden, Kingdom of Saxony
- Died: 7 March 1925 (aged 63) Paris, France
- Resting place: Sainte-Geneviève-des-Bois Russian Cemetery
- Party: Constitutional Democratic (1905 – 1911); Progressive (since 1911)
- Other political affiliations: Union of Liberation
- Spouse: Yulia Bobrinskaya
- Parents: Evgeniy Lvov (father); Varvara Mosolova (mother)
- Education: Moscow State University
- Profession: Politician
- Religion: Russian Orthodoxy

Prince Georgy Yevgenyevich Lvov (Note: Russian: Гео́ргий Евге́ньевич Львов) (2 November [O.S. 21 October] 1861 – 7/8 March 1925) was a Russian aristocrat, statesman and the first prime minister of the Russian Republic from 15 March to 20 July 1917. As Russia's de facto head of state, he led the Provisional Government after the February Revolution led to the suspension of the Russian monarchy.

A member of the Lvov princely family, Lvov was born in Dresden, Germany, and gained national fame for his relief work in the Russian Far East during the Russo-Japanese War. In 1906, he was elected to the First Duma as a member of the Constitutional Democratic Party. After the February Revolution, Lvov was made head of the Provisional Government and oversaw a number of liberal reforms. A series of political crises ultimately brought down his government, and in July 1917 he resigned as prime minister and was succeeded by his war minister, Alexander Kerensky. After the October Revolution, Lvov was arrested by the Bolsheviks, but later escaped to France by way of the United States. He settled in Paris and died in 1925.

== Early life and education ==
Georgy Lvov was born on 2 November 1861 (21 October, Old Style, Julian calendar) in Dresden, Saxony, then part of the German Confederation. The Lvov princely family were among the oldest Russian noble families, tracing their roots from the sovereign Rurik dynasty princes of Yaroslavl. His father was a reform-minded liberal who spent almost all his income on his children's education; Lvov and his five brothers were sent off to the most prestigious Moscow schools. Throughout his youth, Georgy lived with his family at their ancestral home at Popovka in Tula Governorate, less than 120 miles (190 km) away from Moscow and only a few miles away from Yasnaya Polyana, the home of writer Leo Tolstoy. The Lvovs counted Tolstoy as one of their closest friends.

By the standards of the Russian noble class, the Lvovs lived a frugal lifestyle. Luxuries were minimal and their estate was considered small at only 1,000 acres (400 ha). The Lvovs generated massive debts in excess of around 150,000 roubles by the end of the 1870s. With the abolition of serfdom, they fell into the category of landowners who did not have the means to live in the manner to which many other Russian nobles had been accustomed. In order to pay off their arrears, the family were forced to sell their other landed estates, a brewery in Bryansk, and their flat in Moscow. Despite this, they remained heavily in debt and were faced with the prospect of either having to sell Popovka or convert it into a profitable farm. The Lvovs opted for the latter, with Georgy later recalling: "The idea of giving up the home of our ancestors was unthinkable". The farm at Popovka had become so dilapidated after decades of neglect that it required strenuous work to restore it. By this time his father was too ill to work, leaving Georgy's four older brothers and only sister to take charge of the farm while he studied law at the University of Moscow. The family laid off all their servants and lived like peasants ― Lvov would later recall this time as a source of his own emancipation: "It separated us from the upper crust and made us democratic". As a result of their labour, all debts were repaid by the late 1880s and their ancestral home saved.

In 1899, Prince Lvov married a Hungarian-born portrait painter Vilma Lwoff-Parlaghy in Prague; they were quickly divorced, though Vilma continued to style herself the "Princess Lwoff-Parlaghy" using her artist name with the authorisation of Prince Lvov. The prince also continued to provide her with a permanent annual allowance.

Lvov was also married to Countess Julia Alexeievna Bobrinskaya (1867–1903), great-great-granddaughter of Grigory Orlov and Catherine the Great, without issue. They met while Lvov was working in a soup kitchen in Tambov Governorate during the Russian famine of 1891–1892.

== Pre-revolution ==
=== Russo-Japanese War ===
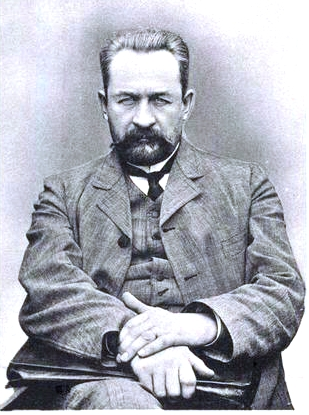
Lvov, deputy of the State Duma of the I convocation, 1906

With the outbreak of war between the Empire of Japan and the Russian Empire in January 1904, the provincial zemstvos were mobilised to assist with the war effort. To help the Red Cross on the Manchurian front, thirteen zemstvos formed a combined medical brigade consisting of 360 doctors and nurses, led by Lvov. This marked the first time that zemstvos had been allowed to organise themselves at a national level after their powers had been restricted by Alexander III in 1890. Lvov had pleaded with Tsar Nicholas to let the brigade go; the tsar was so moved by his patriotic sentiment that he ended up hugging and kissing him and wished him well. The relief mission, which won high praise from Russian military leaders, turned Lvov into a national hero and enabled the zemstvos to reintegrate themselves into Russian governing society.

=== Revolution of 1905 ===
A year later he won election to the First Duma, and was nominated for a ministerial position. He became chairman of the All-Russian Union of Zemstvos in 1914, and in 1915 he became a leader of the Union of Zemstvos as well as a member of Zemgor, a joint committee of the Union of Zemstvos and the Union of Towns that helped supply the military and tend to the wounded from World War I. In December 1916, after Prince Lvov's tirades at the Congress of Zemstvos, the Voluntary Organisations would allow no one to work for the government unless their collaboration were purchased by political concessions.

== February Revolution ==
On 14 January O.S. (27 January N.S.) Lvov proposed to Grand Duke Nicholas Nikolaevich that he should take control of the country. At the end of January negotiations took place between the Allied powers in Petrograd; unofficially they sought to clarify the internal situation in Russia.

== Head of the provisional government ==
During the February Revolution and the abdication of Nicholas II, emperor of Russia, Lvov was made head of the provisional government founded by the Duma on 2 March 1917.

During his first weeks as prime minister, Lvov presided over a series of fleeting reforms which sought to radically liberalise Russia. Universal adult suffrage was introduced, freedoms of press and speech were granted, capital punishment abolished, and all legal restrictions of religion, class and race were removed. In late March, a delegation of women suffragettes planned to lobby Lvov for the right of women to vote in local government elections. Expecting a strenuous battle, the suffragettes were shocked to learn that Lvov had already granted women the right to vote, saying "Why shouldn't women vote? [...] Surely, with universal suffrage there can be no reason to exclude women". Lvov's reforms helped create a new culture of democracy in Russia. One peasant from Penza province changed his surname to Lvov, and another to 'Demakratov'.

Unable to rally sufficient support, he resigned in July 1917 in favour of his Minister of War, Alexander Kerensky.

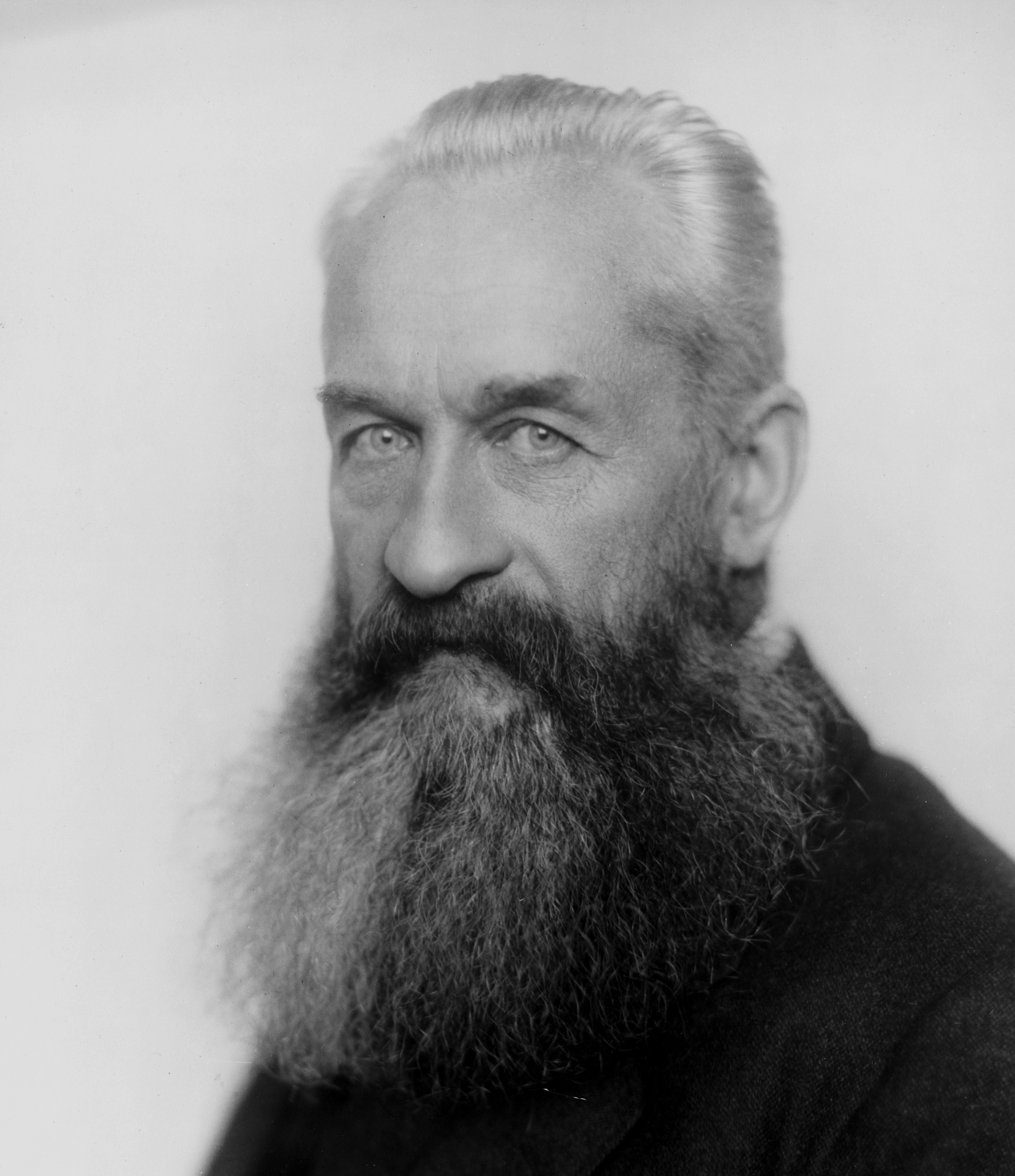
Georgy Lvov, 1919

After the October Revolution he settled in Tyumen. In the winter of 1917 he was arrested and transferred to Yekaterinburg. Three months later, Lvov and two other prisoners (Lopukhin and Prince Nikolai Golitsyn) were released before the court under a written undertaking not to leave the place. The local war commissar, Filipp Goloshchekin, intended to execute Lvov and the other prisoners, but was ordered not to by Isaac Steinberg, the People's Commissar for Justice, a Left-Socialist Revolutionary while they were still in coalition with the Bolsheviks. Lvov immediately left Yekaterinburg, made his way to Omsk, occupied by the anti-Bolshevik Czechoslovak Legion. The Provisional Siberian Government, headed by Pyotr Vologodsky, was formed in Omsk and instructed Lvov to leave for the United States (since it was believed that this country was capable of providing the fastest and most effective assistance to anti-Bolshevik forces) to meet with President Woodrow Wilson and other statesmen to inform them on the aims of the anti-Soviet forces and receiving assistance from former allies of Russia in the First World War. In October 1918 he travelled to the United States but was late as in November of the same year the First World War ended and preparations began for the peace conference in Paris, where the centre of world politics moved.

Having failed to achieve any practical results in the United States, Lvov departed to France, where in 1918–1920 he was at the head of the Russian political meeting in Paris. He was at the source of the labour exchanges system to help Russian emigrants, transferred to their disposal the funds of Zemgor, stored in the National Bank of the United States. Later he left politics, living in Paris in poverty, working at handicraft and writing his memoirs. Georgy Lvov died in Paris, France on 7 March 1925 at the age of 63.

== Memorials ==
There is a memorial to Prince Lvov in Aleksin as well as a small exhibition on him in the town museum. In Popovka there is another memorial opposite his local church and a plaque on the wall of the local school he founded. He died in Boulogne-sur-Seine and is buried in Sainte-Geneviève-des-Bois Russian Cemetery in France.

A relative of his by the name of Prince Andre Nikita Lwoff (1901–1933), variously described as either Georgy Lvov's son or nephew, is buried in the old cemetery in Menton, France.

== Notes ==
Note on transliteration: An older French form, Lvoff, is used on his tombstone. Georgy can be written as Georgi and is sometimes seen in its translated form, George or Jorge.

Political offices
Preceded by Nikolai Golitsyn (Prime Minister); Nicholas II of Russia (Emperor)	Minister-Chairman of the Russian Provisional Government; 15 March 1917 – 20 July 1917	Succeeded by Alexander Kerensky
