= Salt Tax Revolt =

Rebellion in Biscay between 1631 and 1634

The Salt Tax Revolt (Spanish: Rebelión de la Sal) took place in the Spanish province of Biscay (Vizcaya) between 1631 and 1634, and was rooted in an economic conflict concerning the price and ownership of salt. It consisted of a series of violent incidents in opposition to Philip IV's taxation policy, and the rebellion quickly evolved into a broader social protest against economic inequalities.

The origin of the rebellion was the Royal Decree of 3 January 1631, in which Gaspar de Guzmán, Count-Duke of Olivares raised the price of salt by 44%, while also ordering the requisition of all of the salt stored in Biscay, which could, from that point on, only be sold by the royal treasury. The motive of this measure, which contravened the chartered privileges of the domain and its tax exemption, was the need by the monarchy of Habsburg Spain to maintain its costly army in the wars of Northern Europe.

The tax was preceded by other measures to raise money, such as the application of fees to trade in wool or woolen cloth. The population of Biscay reacted angrily against the representatives of royal authority, even going so far as to assassinate the procurator of the Court of Corregidor in October 1632. The revolt also blocked the meeting of the General Assemblies of Guernica in 1633, demanding for all of the abusive taxes to be revoked and for the restoration of the tax exemption recognized in the privileges.

The rebellion, which lasted on-and-off for more than three years, was definitively crushed in the spring of 1634, when the main ringleaders were arrested and executed. Philip opted to pardon the rest of the rebels and to suspend the original order concerning the price of salt as a concession.
