= Moscow plague riot of 1771 =

Riot in Moscow caused by an outbreak of bubonic plague

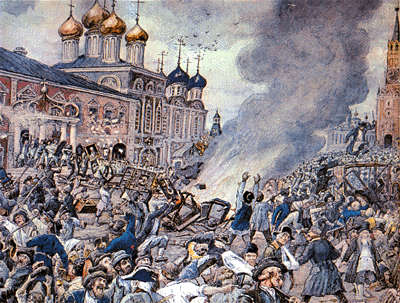
Plague Riot in Moscow, 1771

The Plague Riot (Russian: Чумной бунт, romanized: Chumnoy bunt) was a riot in Moscow in 1771 between 15 and 17 September, caused by an outbreak of bubonic plague.

== History ==
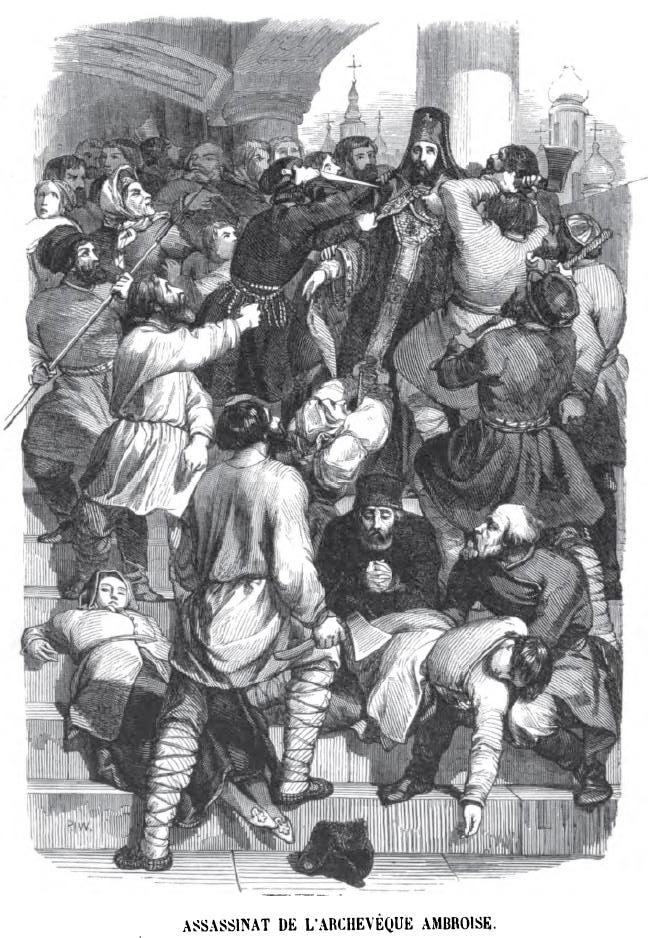
The murder of Archbishop Ambrosius. Engraving by Charles Michel Geoffroy, 1845

The first signs of plague in Moscow appeared in late 1770, which would turn into a major epidemic in the spring of 1771. The measures undertaken by the authorities, such as creation of forced quarantines, destruction of contaminated property without compensation or control, and closing of public baths caused fear and anger among the citizens. The city's economy was mostly paralyzed because many factories, markets, stores, and administrative buildings had been closed down. All of this was followed by acute food shortages, causing deterioration of living conditions for the majority of the Muscovites. Dvoryane (Russian nobility) and well-off city dwellers left Moscow due to the plague outbreak.

The first outbursts of mass protest against the measures undertaken by the authorities took place on 29 August and 1 September in a neighborhood of Lefortovo. By early September, the rumors of an imminent uprising had already been circulating. An attempt by the Archbishop Ambrose of Moscow to prevent the citizens from gathering at the Icon of the Virgin Mary of Bogolyubovo in Kitai-gorod as a quarantine measure served as an immediate cause for the Plague Riot. On 15 September, huge crowds of Muscovites began to flow towards Red Square at the sound of the alarm bell. Pushing aside a military unit, they burst into the Kremlin and destroyed the Chudov Monastery (archbishop's residence) and its wine cellars. Archbishop Ambrosius managed to escape to the Donskoy Monastery.

On 16 September the riot gained in strength. Angry citizens captured the Donskoy Monastery, killed Archbishop Ambrose, and destroyed two quarantine zones (Danilov Monastery and the one beyond the Serpukhov Gates). In the afternoon, most of the rebels approached the Kremlin and were met by a number of the Imperial Russian Army units. The crowd demanded the surrender of Lieutenant General Pyotr Yeropkin, who had been overseeing the affairs of Moscow after Pyotr Saltykov's departure. As soon as the Muscovites tried to attack the Kremlin's Spasskiye Gates, the army opened fire with buckshot, dispersing the crowd and capturing some of the rebels. On the morning of 17 September, around 1000 people gathered at the Spasskiye gates again, demanding the release of captured rebels and elimination of quarantines. The army managed to disperse the crowd yet again and finally suppressed the riot. Some 300 people were brought to trial. A government commission headed by Grigory Orlov was sent to Moscow on 26 September to restore order. It took some measures against the plague and provided citizens with work and food, which would finally pacify the people of Moscow. The commission improved services in quarantines, put an end to the burning of property, reopened public baths, permitted trade, increased food deliveries, and organized public works. At the same time, the commission was engaged in prosecuting those who had taken part in the Plague Riot. Four of them were executed; 165 adults and twelve teenagers were subjected to punishment. With the onset of cold weather, the outbreak began to subside. Around 200,000 people died in Moscow and its outskirts during the plague.

There was another unlikely convict: the church bell that was used to start the alarm. By the order of Catherine the Great, an executor cut the tongue from the bell. For more than thirty years, the silent bell hung on the bell tower. Eventually, in 1803, it was removed and sent to the Arsenal and, in 1821, to the Kremlin Armoury.

== See also ==
- Black Death
- Copper Riot
- Salt Riot
- 1770–1772 Russian plague
