= Inozemsky prikaz =

17th-century Russian government agency

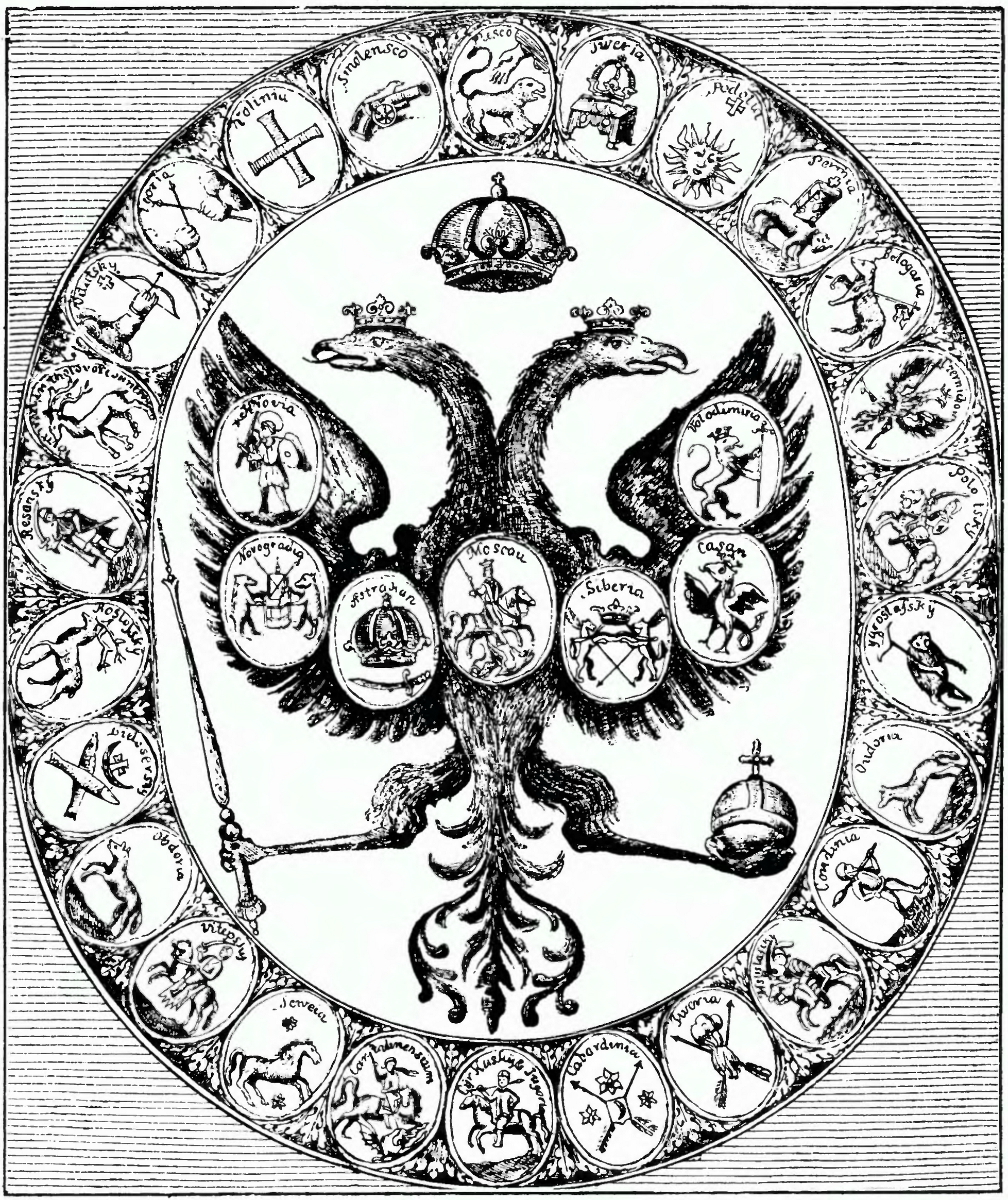

The Inozemsky prikaz (Russian: Иноземский приказ, lit. 'Office for the Affairs of the Foreigners') was a central government agency (a prikaz) in 17th-century Russia, which dealt with the affairs of the foreigners, including those hired by the Russian military. The prikaz was established around 1624 and then merged with the reiter prikaz in 1680. The Inozemsky prikaz also governed the affairs of the German Quarter until 1666. In 1701, its functions were transferred under the authority of prikaz for military affairs.

== See also ==
Regiments of the new order
