= Streletsky prikaz =

Government body in the Tsardom of Russia

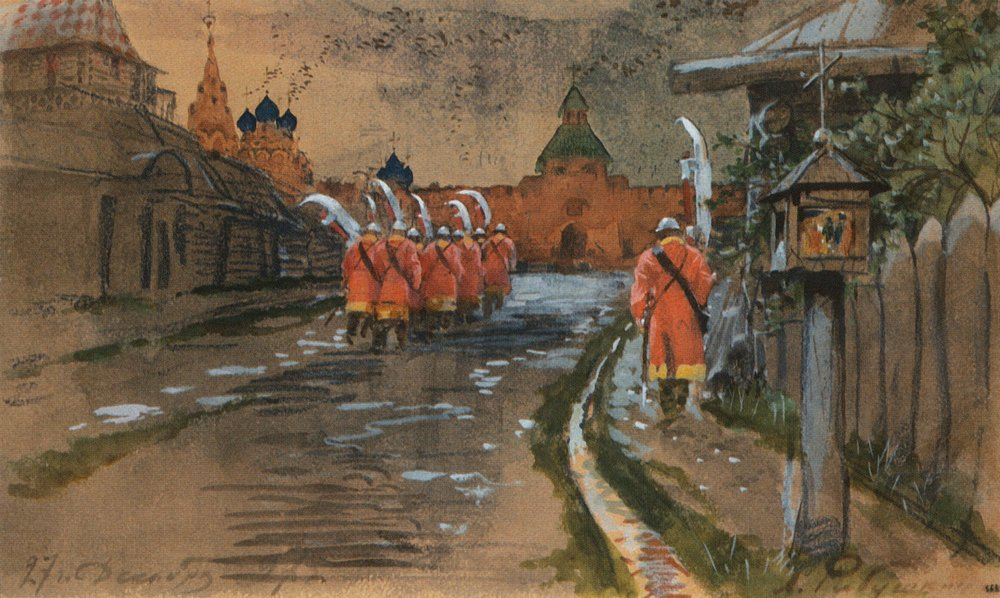
Streltsy patrol at Ilyinsky Gate in Old Moscow, painting by Andrei Ryabushkin (1897)

The Streletsky prikaz (Russian: Стрелецкий приказ), sometimes translated as the Streltsy Department, was one of the main governmental bodies (a prikaz) in Russia during the 16th and 17th centuries which administered the streltsy.

== History ==
The first reference to the Streletsky prikaz appears in 1571, but in the mid-1550s, it already existed under the name of Streletskaya izba (Russian: Стрелецкая изба, lit. 'strelets izba').

The Streletsky prikaz was in charge of the Moscow and municipal streltsy, their lands and other properties, disbursement of their salary and bread allowances, and their cases in court. In 1672–1683, it also collected the taxes of the streltsy. After the streltsy uprising in 1698, the Streletsky prikaz was engaged in regular administrative and managerial matters. In 1701, it was transformed into the Prikaz zemskikh del (Russian: Приказ земских дел), inheriting the functions of the zemstvo police department in Moscow.

== See also ==
- Inozemsky prikaz
