= Okolnichy =

Former Russian court official position

Okolnichy (Russian: око́льничий, IPA: [ɐˈkolʲnʲɪtɕɪj]) was an old Russian court official position. According to the Brockhaus and Efron Encyclopedic Dictionary, directives on the position of okolnichy date back to the 14th century. Judging by the Russian records from the 16th and 17th centuries, okolnichy were entrusted with the same business in administration as boyars, with the only difference that they were placed second to boyars everywhere. While lower than boyars, it was one of the highest ranks (or positions) close to the tsar in the courts of the Moscow rulers until the government reform undertaken by Peter the Great.

The word is derived from the Russian word окoлo (okolo) meaning 'close, near', in this case 'sitting close to the Tsar'. In the mid-16th century the role became second (subordinate) to boyars.

== Description ==
The duties of the first known okolnichies included arranging the travel and quarters of grand princes and tsars, as well as accommodating foreign ambassadors and presenting them to the court.

Okolnichies had a seat in prikazes, were appointed as namestniks and voivodes, served as diplomatic envoys and members of the tsar's council (duma).

Initially the rank of okolnichy was the second highest after that of boyar, while often they performed similar duties. According to the system of mestnichestvo, a person could not be made a boyar unless someone else in his family had recently held the boyar/okolnichy rank. Consequently, a position of okolnichy was a step towards granting the boyar rank to a non-noble. Even Prince Dmitry Pozharsky, though a Rurikid knyaz by birth and the "Saviour of the Motherland" by royal mercy, could not secure a position higher than okolnichy, because neither his parents nor uncles had ever held a rank higher than stolnik.

Under the Romanovs, the 18 noblest families of Tsardom of Russia were given the privilege of starting their official career from the rank of okolnichy, skipping all the lower ranks, such as stolnik. At the same period, the positions of okolnichy were differentiated and some of them (quarters okolnichy or close okolnichy) were of higher rank than that of non-close boyars. The terms derive from a semi-formal ranking based on the proximity to the tsar at the tsar's table.

== List of okolnichies ==
=== Ivan III of Russia ===
Year	Name	Notes
1462	Ivan Glebov-Oschera	
1476-1522	Ivan Vorontsov-Veliaminov Schedra	
1476	Andrei Plescheyev	
1485	Jurlo Plescheyev	
1487-1503	Nikifor Basenkov	
1489	Yuriy Kutuzov-Shestak	
1489-1501	Boris Kutuzov	
1495-1505	Petr Zabolotskiy	
1495-1504	Prince Ivan Zvenigorodskiy-Zvenets	
1495	Petr Plescheyev	
1498-1524	Ivan Vorontsov-Veliaminov Oblias	
1500	Grigoriy Mamon	
1500	Ivan Chulkov-Chebot	
1501-1515	Petr Davydov-Khromoy	
1501	Prince Vasiliy Romodanovskiy	
1501	Afanasiy Sakmyshev	
1503	Ivan Mamonov Bolshoy	

=== Vasiliy III of Russia ===
Year	Name	Notes
1506-1515	Konstantin Zabolotskiy	
1506	Prince Konstantin Ushaty	
1510	Prince Vasiliy Zvenigorodskiy Nozdrovaty	
1510-1511	Mikhail Bezzubtsev	
1510-1516	Petr Zhitov	
1510-1520	Ivan Zhulebin	
1510-1522	Petr Zakharyin-Yakovlev	
1510	Ivan Morozov-Poplevin	
1510	Andrei Saburov	
1510	Ivan Dobrynskiy-Simskiy Khabar	
1512-1515	Ivan Kolychyov Loban	Killed
1513-1535	Andrei Buturlin	
1514-1528	Vasiliy Zakharyin-Yakovlev	
1514-1538	Mikhail Zakharyin-Yuryev	
1514-1520	Dmitriy Kitayev	
1514	Ivan Liatskiy	
1516	Vasiliy Morozov-Poplevin	
1516	Fedor Peshkov-Saburov Musa	
1517	Fedor Karpov	
1518	Mikhail Tuchkov-Morozov	
1522	Mikhail Plescheyev	
1522	Prince Semen Serebriany	
1522	Prince Ivan Telepnev-Obolenskiy, the Mute	
1522	Prince Ivan Ushaty-Liapun	
1523-1529	Andrei Velikoy	
1523	Prince Mikhail Kubenskiy	
1524	Prince Ivan Paletskiy	
1525-1534	Fedor Bezzubtsev	
1530	Fedor Karpov	
1532	Yakov Morozov-Poplevin	
1532	Prince Vasiliy Ushaty-Chulok	

=== Ivan the Terrible ===
Year	Name	Notes
1535	Ivan Briukhovo-Morozov	
1535	Semen Shestunov-Krivoy	
1536-1561	Ivan Vorontsov-Foka	
1538-1554	Ivan Zhulebin Bolshoy	
1538-1543	Dmitriy Ivanov-Slepoy	
1539	Fedor Nagoy	
1539-1545	Semen Bezzubtsov Yepanchin	
1540	Prince Ivan Riapolovskiy Strigin	
1542	Fedor Plescheyev	
1543-1547	Ivan Bezzubtsov	
1544	Ivan Shein	
1547-1551	Ivan Kolychyov-Rudakov	
1547	Danila Zakharyin	Okolnichy and Dvoretsky (1547)
1548-1555	Ivan Kolychyov Umnoy	
1548-1556	Fedor Adashev	
1548	Grigoriy Morozov-Poplevin	
1548	Mikhail Morozov-Poplevin	
1548	Danila Zakharyin	
1549-1557	Andrei Kvashin	
1549-1571	Dolmat Karpov	
1549	Ivan Sheremetev Bolshoy	
1549	Grigoriy Yakovlia	
1550-1554	Ivan Karpov	
1550	Semen Zabolotskiy	
1550	Vladimir Morozov-Poplevin	
1550	Petr Morozov-Poplevin	
1550	Semen Peshkov-Saburov	
1550	Yakov Saltykov	
1552-1567	Ivan Vorontsov	
1552-1562	Ivan Golovin	
1552	Semen Morozov-Poplevin	
1552	Aleksei Basmanov	
? (died 1566)	Mikhail Golovin	Executed
1552	Lev Saltykov	
1552	Ivan Chobotov	
1554	Prince Ivan Khvorostinin	
1554	Ivan Alferyev	
1555-1560	Vasiliy Borisov	
1555-1561	Aleksei Adashev	
1555	Dmitriy Chebotov	
1555	Mikhail Yakovlia	
1556	Dmitriy Plescheyev	
1556	Vasiliy Danilov	
1557	Semen Yakovlev	
155?	Ivan Yakovlev	
1557	Nikita Sheremetev	
1558	Ivan Sheremetev Menshoy	
1558	Dmitriy Shastunov	
1559	Daniil Adashev	Executed
1559	Fedor Kolychyov-Umnoy	
1559	Prince Vasiliy Sitskiy	
1559	Mikhail Yuryev	
1559	Vasiliy Yakovlia	
? (died 1561)	Prince Dmitriy Paletskiy	
1563-1575	Petr Zaitsov	
1563	Zakhariy Plescheyev	
1563-1567	Petr Golovin	
1565-1575	Vasiliy Kolychyov-Umnoy	
1565-1571	Mikhail Lykov	
1565	Mikhail Tuchkov-Morozov	
1565	Ivan Chulkov	
1567-1571	Mikhail Kolychyov	Executed
1567-1576	Nikita Borisov	
1568-1571	Prince Vasiliy Viazemskiy	
1569	Prince Dmitriy Khvorostinin	
1571	Prince Ivan Khvorostinin	
1572	Grigoriy Sobakin	
1572	Vasiliy Sobakin Menshoy	
1572	Prince Osip Scherbatov	
1573	Prince Petr Tatev	
1573	Vasiliy Kolychyov	
1573-1578	Vasiliy Vorontsov	Executed
1573-1605	Dmitriy Godunov	
1573	Prince Yuriy Tokmakov	
1573	Prince Boris Tulupov	
1576-1605	Stepan Godunov	
1576	Boris Shein	
1577	Prince Petr Tatev	
1577	Prince Dmitriy Khvorostinin	
1577	Fedor Nagoy	
1577	Mikhail Petrov	
1577	Fedor Sheremetev	
1577-1580	Prince Timofei Dolgorukov	
1563-1571	Afanasiy Buturlin	
1563	Ivan Buturlin	
1568-1575	Dmitriy Buturlin	
1581	Prince Ivan Velikogagin Menshoy	
1581-1602	Ivan Godunov	
1581	Prince Fedor Troyekurov	
15??	Dolmat Dalmatov-Karpov	At times of Ivan the Terrible

=== Feodor I of Russia, the Blessed ===
Year	Name	Notes
1584-1586	Prince Dmitriy Yeletskiy Boroda	
1584	Prince Fedor Khvorostinin	
1584	Ivan Saburov-Peshko	
1584	Prince Ivan Ganin	
1584-1613	Ivan Golovin	
1585	Prince Ivan Kolychev-Kriuk	
1585-1589	Prince Boris Zasekin	
1585-1604	Ivan Buturlin	
1587-1600	Andrei Kleshnin	
1587	Nikita Ochin-Plescheyev	
1587	Prince Petr Lobanov-Rostovskiy	
1590	Mikhail Saltykov	
1591	Semen Saburov Peshko	
1592-1607	Yakov Godunov-Tolstoy	
1593	Prince Ivan Turenin	
1596-1604	Dmitriy Veliaminov-Obenekov	

=== Boris Godunov ===
Year	Name	Notes
1598-1610	Bogdan Belskiy	
1598-1605	Semen Godunov	
1598-1639	Matvei Godunov	
1598	Stepan Godunov	
1598-1622	Nikita Godunov	
1598	Prince Vasiliy Khvorostinin	
1598	Mikhail Saltykov	
1598	Mikhail Romanov	
1598-1603	Foma Buturlin	
1601	Vasiliy Morozov	
1601-1606	Petr Basmanov	
1603	Prince Ivan Khvorostinin	
1603-1611	Prince Aleksandr Zasekin-Zhyrovoy	
1604	Ivan Basmanov	
1604-1610	Ivan Godunov	
1604	Prince Vasiliy Terenin	
1604	Petr Sheremetev	

=== False Dmitry I ===
Year	Name	Notes
1605-1613	Prince Grigoriy Dolgorukov	Killed
1605	Andrei Nagoy	
1605	Grigoriy Nagoy	
1605	Prince Dmitriy Turenin-Obolenskiy	

=== Vasili IV of Russia Shuiskiy ===
Year	Name	Notes
1606-1612	Vasiliy Golovin	
1606	Prince Vladimir Klubkov-Mosalskiy	
1606	Aleksei Plescheyev	
1606	Prince Grigoriy Romodanovskiy	
1607	Mikhail Tatischev	
1607-1654	Semen Golovin	
1607	Vasiliy Schelkalov	
1607-1634	Artemiy Izmailov	
1610	Prince Vasiliy Litvinov-Mosalskiy	

=== Michael of Russia ===
Year	Name	Notes
1613	Boris Saltykov	
1619-1620	Aleksei Zyuzin	
1620-1640	Fedor Buturlin	
1622-1628	Prince Fedor Lykov	
1623-1627	Prince Daniil Dolgorukov	
1623	Mikhail Saltykov	
1626-1643	Lev Dolmatov-Karpov	
1627-1634	Prince Grigory Volkonsky	
1627-1629	Vasiliy Akhamashukov-Cherkasskiy	
1627-1640	Feodor Buturlin	
1627-1640	Lev Dalmatov-Karpov	
1627-1640	Grigoriy Pushkin	
1628-1629	Prince Aleksei Lvov	
1629 и 1636—1658	Prince Andrei Litvinov-Mosalskiy	
1629-1640	Prince Semen Prozorovskiy	
1629-1640	Stepan Proyestev	
1630	Lukian Streshnev	
1634	Vasiliy Streshnev	
1634-1635	Vasiliy Korobyin	
1634-1665	Prince Fedor Volkonskiy	
1635	Prince Andrei Masalskiy	
1636-1646	Fedor Volynskiy	
1636-1640	Mikhail Saltykov	
1636-1640	Fedor Streshnev	
1637	Nikolay Veliaminov-Obenekov	
1640	Miron Veliaminov-Zernov	
1640	Prince Dmitriy Lvov	
1640	Nikifor Sobakin	
1640-1658	Boris Pushkin	

=== Alexis of Russia ===
Year	Name	Notes
1645	Grigoriy Pushkin	
1646	Prince Dmitriy Volkonskiy	
1646	Prince Vasiliy Romodanovskiy Menshoy	
1646	Mikhail Buturlin	
1646	Petr Trakhaniotov	
1646	Fedor Karpov-Dolmatov	
1647	Prince Semen Pozharskiy	
1647	Prince Ivan Khilkov	
1648	Prince Ivan Romodanovskiy Menshoy	
1649	Prince Ivan Khilkov	
1649	Stepan Pushkin	
1649-1651	Timofei Buturlin	
1650-1673	Fedor Buturlin	
1650-1655	Vasiliy Buturlin	
1650	Mikhail Rtischev	
1650	Vasiliy Choglokov	
(?) died 1650	Prince Petr Volkonskiy	
1651	Stepan Streshnev	
1651-1674	Prince Dmitriy Dolgorukov	
1652-1654	Petr Golovin	
1652-1659	Prince Semen Lvov	
1653	Prince Aleksei Dolgorukov	
1654	Prince Boris Troyekurov	
1655	Andrei Buturlin	
1655	Daniil Velikogagin	
1655	Prince Timofei Scherbatov	
1655-1667	Zhdan Kondyrev	
1655	Fedor Kriukov	received feoffment as yaselnichy
1656	Nikita Boborykin	
1656	Fedor Rtischev	
1658-1664	Fedor Yelizarov	
1658-1667	Vasiliy Yeropkin	
1658	Ivan Gavrenev	
1658-1661	Aleksei Kolychyov	
1658	Fedor Miloslavskiy	
1658	Prince Ivan Lobanov-Rostovskiy	
1658	Prince Vasiliy Lvov	
1658	Prince Semen Lvov	
1658	Prince Lobanov-Rostovskiy	
1658	Prince Semen Pozharskiy	
1658-1664	Prince Fedor Dolgorukov	
1658	Prince Grigoriy Romodanovskiy	
1658	Prince Ivan Pozharskiy	
1658	Prokofiy Sokovnin	
1658	Ivan Streshnev Menshoy	
1658	Prince Fedor Khilkov	
1658	Bogdan Khitrovo	
1658	Vasiliy Choglokov	
1658	Osip Shusherin	
1658	Timofei Shusherin	
1658-1668	Prince Nikita Lvov	
1658-1668	Prince Dmitriy Dolgorukov	
1658-1668	Prince Petr Dolgorukov	
1658-1668	Prince Danila Veliko-Gagin	
1658-1668	Andrei Buturlin	
1658-1668	Fedor Buturlin	
1658-1673	Semen Izmailov	
1658-1668	Prince Ivan Pozharskiy	
1658-1668	Fedor Rtischev	
1658-1668	Osip Sukin	
1658-1676	Prince Ivan Bariatinskiy	
1658-1676	Nikita Boborykin	
1658-1676	Mikhail Volynskiy	
1658-1676	Vasiliy Volynskiy	
1658-1676	Ivan Miloslavskiy	
1658-1676	Ivan Streshnev Bolshoy	
1658-1676	Rodion Streshnev	
1659	Mikhail Volynskiy	
1660	Prince Osip Scherbatov	
1665	Ivan Miloslavskiy	
1665	Afanasiy Ordin-Naschokin	
(?) died 1667	Vasiliy Choglokov	
1668	Prince Yuriy Bariatisnkiy	
1668-1675	Prince Vasiliy Volkonskiy-Verigin Liubka	
1668-1676	Prince Vladimir Dolgorukov	
1668-1676	Prince Grigoriy Kozlovskiy	
1668-1676	Matvei Pushkin	
1668-1686	Petr Skuratov	
1670-1676	Konstantin Shusherin	Boyar (1682—1692).
1671-1675	Prince Vasiliy Volkonskiy-Verigin Liubka	
1672	Artamon Matveyev	
1672	Kirill Naryshkin	
1675	Ivan Khitrovo	

=== Feodor III of Russia ===
Year	Name	Notes
1676-1677	Ivan Buturlin	
1676	Matvei Miloslavskiy	
1676	Prince Aleksandr Lobanov-Rostovskiy	
1676	Afanasiy Narbekov	
1676	Grigoriy Sobakin	
1676-1686	Aleksandr Khitrovo	
1677	Ivan Khitrovo Bolshoy	
1677	Yakov Volynskiy	
1677	Aleksei Golovin	
1677	Mikhail Golovin	
1677	Semen Zaborovskiy	
1677	Ivan Matiushkin	
1677	Petr Matiushkin	
1677	Ivan Kondyrev	
1677	Ivan Rzhevskiy	
1677	Vasiliy Sobakin	
1677	Fedor Sokovnin	
1677	Ilya Chirikov	
1677	Boris Yushkov	
1677	Prince Grigoriy Volkonskiy	
1677	Prince Ivan Troyekurov	
1677-1686	Andrei Chirikov	
1677-1686	Petr Kondyrev	
1677-1692	Prince Stepan Lvov	
1678	Semen Kondyrev	
1678-1686	Ivan Pronchischev	
1678-1692	Ivan Chaadayev	
1679	Nikita Streshnev	
1679	Boris Buturlin	
1679	Ivan Volynskiy	
1679	Ivan Kodanov	
1679	Prince Mikhail Lvov	
1679-1686	Prince Daniil Bariatinskiy	
1680	Prince Daniil Bariatinskiy	
1680	Ivan Yazykov	
1680	Prince Boris Gorchakov	
1680	Aleksei Likhachyov	
1681	Prince Ivan Korkodinov	
1681	Prince Mikhail Lykov	

=== Ivan V of Russia and Peter the Great ===
Year	Name	Notes
1682	Roman Bobrykin	
1682	Fedor Leontyev	
1682	Andrei Leontyev	
1682	Ivan Leontyev	
1682-1692	Vasiliy Leontyev	
1682	Pavel Yazykov	
1682	Prince Fedul Volkonskiy	
1682	Prince Mikhail Volkonskiy	
1682	Prince Vladimir Volkonskiy	
1682	Prince Petr Lvov	
1682	Fedor Volynskiy	
1682-1692	Mikhail Glebov	
1682	Petr Golovin	
1682	Lev Golokhvastov	
1682	Prince Mikhail Zhirovoy-Zasekin	
1682	Andrei Matveyev	
1682	Aleksandr Protasyev	
1682	Bogdan Pushkin	
1682	Andrei Tolshoy	
1682	Fedor Scheglovitov	
1682-1686	Larion Miloslavskiy	
1682-1686	Tikhon Streshnev	
1682-1686	Prince Yakov Khilkov	
1682-1686	Kirill Khlopov	
1682-1692	Venedikt Zmeyev	
1682-1692	Prince Boris Gorchakov	
1682-1692	Vasiliy Narbekov	
1682-1692	Bogdan Polibin	
1682-1692	Ivan Pushkin	
1682-1692	Aleksei Sokovnin	
1683	Prince Nikita Rostovskiy	
1683-1686	Leontiy Nepliuyev	
1683-1686	Ivan Buturlin	
1683-1686	Prince Matvei Obolenskiy	
1683-1686	Aleksei Rzhevskiy	
1683-1692	Ivan Musin-Pushkin	
1683-1692	Matvei Izmailov	
1683-1692	Semen Tolochanov	
1683-1692	Prince Ivan Khotetovskiy	
1683-1692	Prince Fedor Shakhovskoy	
1683-1692	Prince Dmitriy Scherbatov	
1684-1713	Petr Apraksin	
1684-1692	Nikita Akinfov	
1684-1727	Fedor Apraksin	Governor of Astrakhan (1693), Admiral general (1706)
1684-1686	Mikhail Tatischev	
1684-1692	Ivan Zheliabuzhskiy	
1684-1692	Prince Vasiliy Zasekin	
1685	Prince Ivan Dashkov	
1686	Fedor Golovin	
1686	Yakov Pushkin	
1686 и 1692	Mikhail Likhachev	
1687-1692	Prince Mikhail Lvov	
1688	Petr Lopukhin Menshoy	
1688	Kondratiy Naryshkin	
1688	Matvei Naryshkin	
1688	Aggei Shepelev	
1688-1692	Ivan Leontyev	
1688-1692	Ivan Matiushkin	
1688-1692	Prince Petr Lvov	
1688-1692	Mikhail Sobakin	
1689	Ivan Golovin	
1689	Vasiliy Lopukhin	
1689	Illarion Lopukhin	
1689	Petr Lopukhin Bolshoy	
1689	Ivan Golovkin	
1689	Semen Poltev	
1689	Ivan Tatischev Bolshoy	
1689	Fedor Shaklovity	
1689-1692	Ivan Golovin	
1689-1692	Kiryan Kvashnin-Samarin	
1689-1692	Grigoriy Naryshkin	
1689-1692	Pavel Savyolov	
1689-1692	Dmitriy Streshnev	
1690-1692	Andrei Leontyev	
1690-1692	Prince Ivan Zasekin	
1690-1692	Fedor Zykov	
1690-1692	Mikhail Kolupayev	
1690-1692	Mikhail Glebov	
1690-1692	Iov Golokhvastov	
1690-1692	Rodion Pavlov	
1690-1692	Timofei Savyolov	
1690-1692	Vasiliy Streshnev	
1690-1692	Prince Ivan Ukhtomskiy	
1690-1692	Prince Perfiliy Shakhovskoy	
1691	Semen Koltovskiy	
1691	Vasiliy Naryshkin	
1691-1692	Fedor Narbekov	
1691-1692	Prince Fedor Bariatinskiy	
1691-1692	Aleksandr Protasyev	
1692	Vasiliy Leontyev	
1692	Ivan Naryshkin	
1692	Petr Potyomkin	
1692	Prince Vladimir Volkonskiy	
1692	Timofei Yushkov	
1693	Petr Golovin	
1693	Prince Mikhail Zhirovoy-Zasekin	
1693	Yuriy Shusherin	
1693-1696	Timofei Choglokov	
1711	Aleksei Yushkov	Promoted from stolniks to okolnichies (4 November 1711) during trip of the Tsar to Elbing. There were no more promotions to okolnichy.

== See also ==
- Voyevoda
