= Diak (clerk) =

Historical Russian bureaucratic occupation

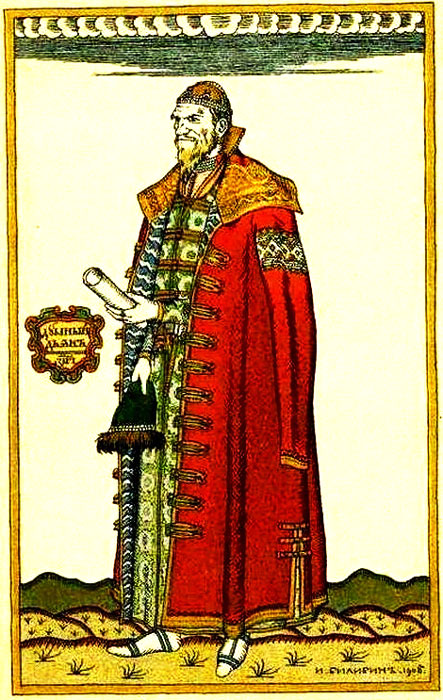
Duma Diak by Ivan Bilibin

A diak, d'iak or dyak (Russian: дьяк, IPA: [ˈdʲjak]) is a historical Russian bureaucratic occupation whose meaning varied over time and approximately corresponded to the notions of "chief clerk" or "chief of office department".

A diak was a title of the chief of a structural division of a prikaz. For example, "посольский дьяк" (posolsky diak) is a diak of the posolsky prikaz (foreign ministry). A duma diak (думный дьяк) was the lowest rank in the boyar duma (15th to 17th centuries).

Outside of the grand princely administration, the diaki were also found in ecclesiastical (episcopal) administrations, particularly in Veliky Novgorod. In this sense they may be more broadly defined as secretaries or clerks. According to the Life of Archbishop Iona of Novgorod (r. 1458–1470), although he was a poor orphan, the woman who raised him hired a diak to teach him reading and writing. Chronicle sources also indicate that Archbishop Feofil (r. 1470–1480) had his diak write up a charter recognizing grand prince Ivan III's powers following his seizure of the city in 1478.

After the Muscovite annexation, the office of the diak continued as one of the more important administrators of the House of Holy Wisdom, as the archiepiscopal (and later metropolitan) administration in Novgorod the Great was known. The dvortsovyi diak essentially ran the financial and administrative affairs of the archbishops and metropolitans (they were so important that Boris Grekov wrote that one could not brew kvas in the city without his permission). That, however, was after the Muscovite annexation, and the administrative structure of the House of Holy Wisdom had been reorganized along the lines of the grand princely administration in Moscow. Indeed, when Archbishop Sergei (r. 1483–1484) arrived in Novgorod following his election, he was accompanied by a diak and a treasurer who were to see that the archiepiscopal administration complied with Muscovite norms.

== See also ==
- Voivode
- Podyachy
- Deacon#Cognates for other historical terms derived from the Greek diakonos. In particular, the term "diachok" is constructed in Russian language as a diminutive from "diak", however it refers to a rather different occupation.
- pevchy dyak (tsar's or church singer).
- Russian rank titles during the sixteenth and seventeenth centuries
