= Prikaz =

Military government agencies in Tsardom of Russia, 16th-17th centuries

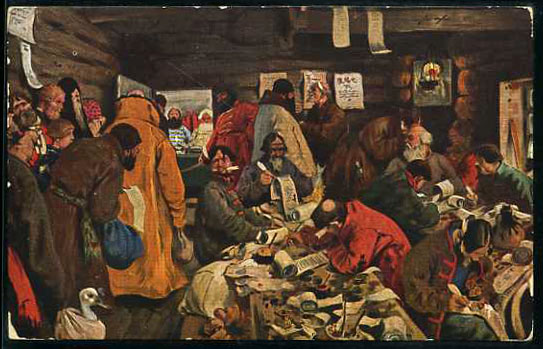
In a Prikaz of the Muscovite Times, by Sergey Ivanov

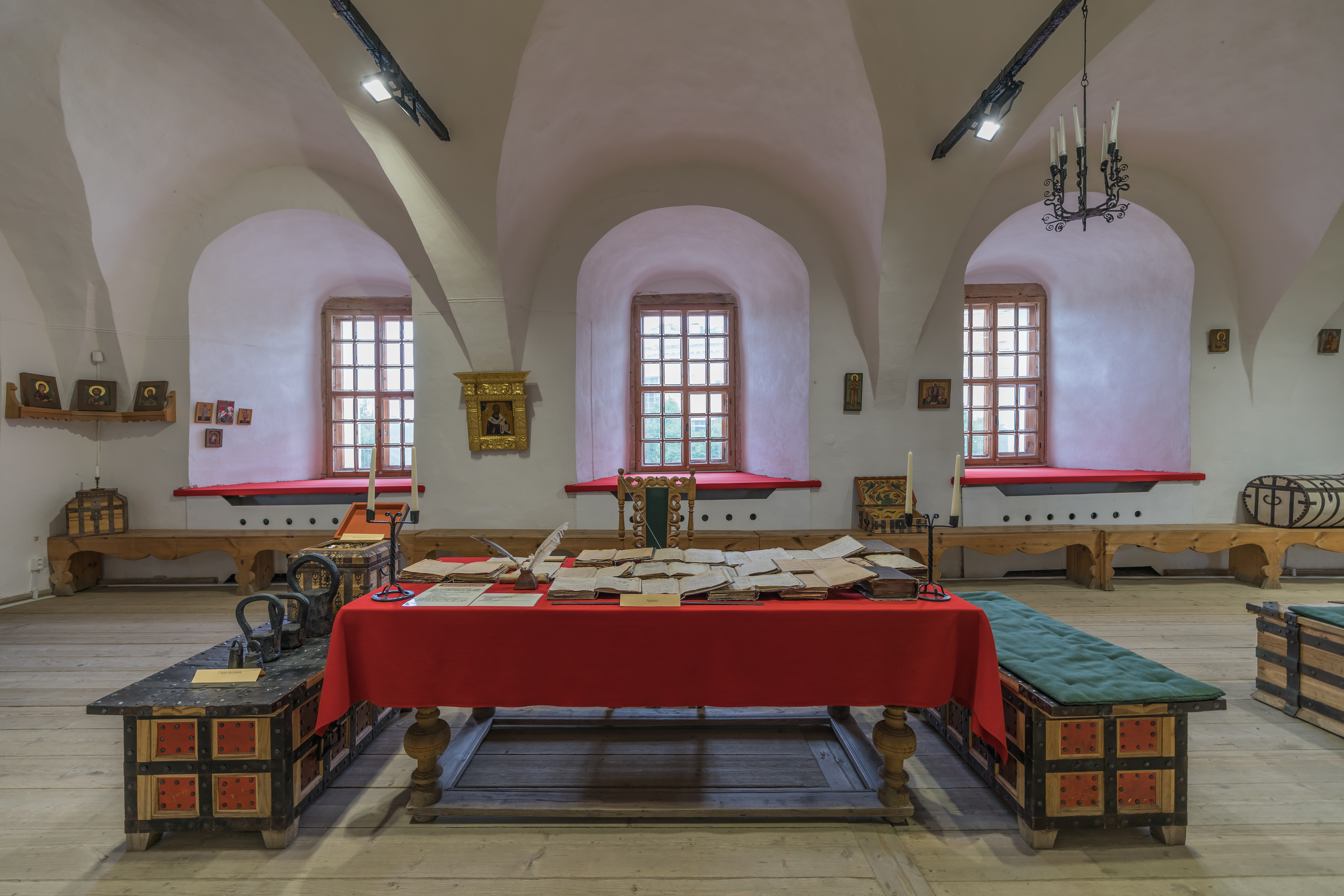
In the Prikaz Palace in Pskov (reconstruction)

A prikaz (Russian: прика́з; IPA: [prʲɪˈkas], plural: prikazy) was an administrative, judicial, territorial, or executive office functioning on behalf of palace, civil, military, or church authorities in the Grand Duchy of Moscow and the Tsardom of Russia from the 15th to the 18th centuries. The term usually suggests the functionality of a modern "ministry", "office", "department", or "bureau"; however, in practice prikaz was historically applied to most governmental organizations regardless of their function or authority. In modern Russian, prikaz literally means an 'order' in the meaning of 'directive' or 'command'.

Most of the prikazy were subordinated to the boyar duma. Some of them, palace prikazy (Russian: дворцовые приказы, romanized: dvortsovyje prikazy), were subordinated to the taynyi prikaz or pervyi prikaz, which answered directly to the tsar of Russia. The patriarch of Moscow and all Rus' had his own prikazy.

== History ==
Originally, prikazy were created by private orders given by the tsar to a certain person. The functions of the prikazy would be led by boyars and professional administrators. From 1512, the term "prikaz" started to be used to refer to offices. There were 22 prikazy (departments) in 1613, however this number would balloon to 80 by the mid-17th century.

=== Abolition ===
The prikazy were abolished by Peter the Great as part of his governmental reform program and replaced them, beginning in 1717, with administrative organs known as Collegiums. This process would undergo a long span of time; the Siberian Prikaz, for example, was restored in 1730 and existed until 1755. At the beginning of the 18th century, Peter the Great even established some new prikazy. The system was only fully eliminated by Catherine the Great in 1775.

== List of Russian prikazy ==
- Foreign affairs
  - Ambassadorial Prikaz (Posolsky Prikaz) — in charge of international affairs, a kind of a Ministry of Foreign Affairs, 1549-1718
  - Captive Prikaz, (Polonyanichy Prikaz from archaic Russian: полон, плен 'polon', 'plen' meaning "captive") — for the redemption of Russian captives and prisoners of war
  - Prikaz of Pans (Panskiy Prikaz) — office of Polish affairs
- Administrative
  - Prikaz of the Seal (Pechatny Prikaz) — placed the tsar's seal on various documents granting various things to private individuals, and collected the corresponding duties
  - Stone Prikaz (Kamennyi Prikaz)
  - Coachman Prikaz (Courier Prikaz, Yam Prikaz: Yamskoy Prikaz)
  - Book Printing Prikaz
  - Prikaz of Hospice Construction
  - Pharmaceutical Prikaz (Aptekarskiy prikaz)
  - Monk Prikaz (Monasheskiy Prikaz)
- Judicial Prikazes
  - Moscow
  - Vladimir
  - Dmitrov
  - Ryazan
- Military Prikazes
  - Prikaz of Riflemen (Streletsky Prikaz)
  - Artillery Prikaz, (Pushkarsky Prikaz)
  - Prikaz of Admiralty, (Admiralteysky Prikaz)
  - Prikaz of Cossacks (Kazachy Prikaz), 1618–1646
  - Armored Prikaz (Bronniy Prikaz)
  - Conscription Prikaz (Prikaz sbora ratnykh i datochnykh lydei (Russian: сбора ратных и даточных людей)
  - Foreigners' Prikaz (Inozemsky Prikaz)
  - Arsenal Prikaz (Oruzheiniy Prikaz)
  - Preobrazhensky prikaz (ru) — oversaw the Preobrazhensky and Semyonovsky regiments in the 18th century
  - Prikaz of German feeds — probably, paid a salary to foreigners (known as "Germans" (Russian: немцы, romanized: niemtsy, which also means "mute people")) in Russian military or state service
  - Ritter Prikaz
- Financial Prikazes
  - Domestic Prikaz (Pomestny Prikaz)
  - Accounting Prikaz
  - Prikaz of Grand Treasury
  - Prikaz of Grand Income
- Security
  - Prikaz of Petitions (Chelobitny Prikaz) — considered complaints or petitions addressed to the Tsar; the adjective chelobitnaya (Russian: челобитная) comes from the expression bit' chelom, "to knock with one's forehead (on the ground)", meaning a very humble submission of a petition, with an extremely low bow. The standard form of such complaint included the words "Slave of God ... (or: 'Your slave') is beating with the forehead", or "Slaves and orphans are beating with foreheads"
  - Privy Prikaz (Prikaz tainyh del, Tayny Prikaz) — secret police (1654–1676)
  - Robbery Prikaz (Razboiniy Prikas) — criminal police
  - Prikaz of Investigations (Sysknoy prikaz)
- Regional Prikazes
  - Little Russia, Ministry of the Ukrainian (Malorossiya) Affairs (Малороссийский приказ, Malorossiyskiy prikaz)
  - Kazan (Казанский приказ, Приказ Казанского дворца, Kazan Palace Prikaz), Volga Region (Поволжье) Affairs (South-West of Russia, territories of former Kazan Khanate)
  - Siberia (Sibirskiy prikaz), (1637–1763)
  - Great Russia
  - Grand Duchy of Lithuania
  - Smolensk (disbanded on Poland's conquest of Smolensk (1611); restored when Smolensk returned to Russian control in 1654)
  - Livonia Affairs
  - Novgorod quarter
  - Vladimir quarter
  - Ustyug quarter
  - Kostroma quarter
  - Galich quarter
  - Smolensk quarter
- Palace Prikazes
  - Prikaz of Stables Konyushenny Prikaz
  - Palace Prikaz (Dvortsovyi Prikaz, 1627–1709)
  - Prikaz of Stone Palace (Prikaz kamennogo dvortsa)
  - Prikaz of Gold and Silver Affairs
  - Prikaz of Requiem (Panihydniy prikaz) - requiems for members of the tsar's family
- Patriarchal Prikazes
  - Patriarchal Prikaz-in-charge
  - Patriarchal Treasury Prikaz
  - Patriarchal Palace Prikaz
- Other
  - Order-in-charge (Razryadny Prikaz) — in charge of higher military and civil administration personnel
  - Kholop Prikaz (Kholopskiy Prikaz) — considered the affairs of kholops

== Classification ==
The classification of the various prikazes is a very difficult task. In fact, each major historian tries to build their own system of classification. Major variants include prikazes of a territory, of a class of population, or of an area of affairs. Another method of classification is to rank prikazes by subordination.

== See also ==
- Dyak, clerk
- Podyachy, clerk assistant
- List of Russian foreign ministers
