= Russia in World War I =

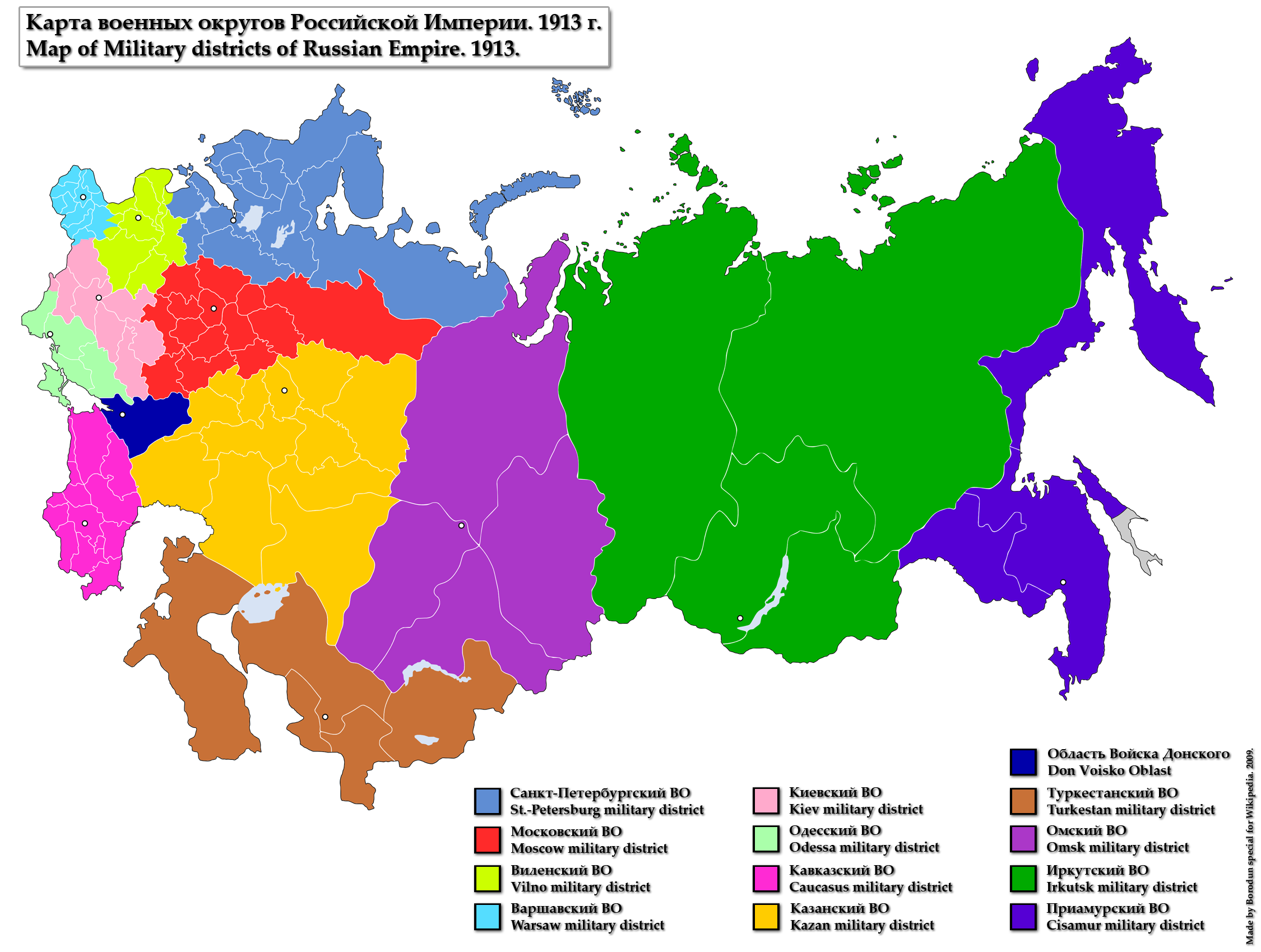
Map of military districts from the reform of 1913.

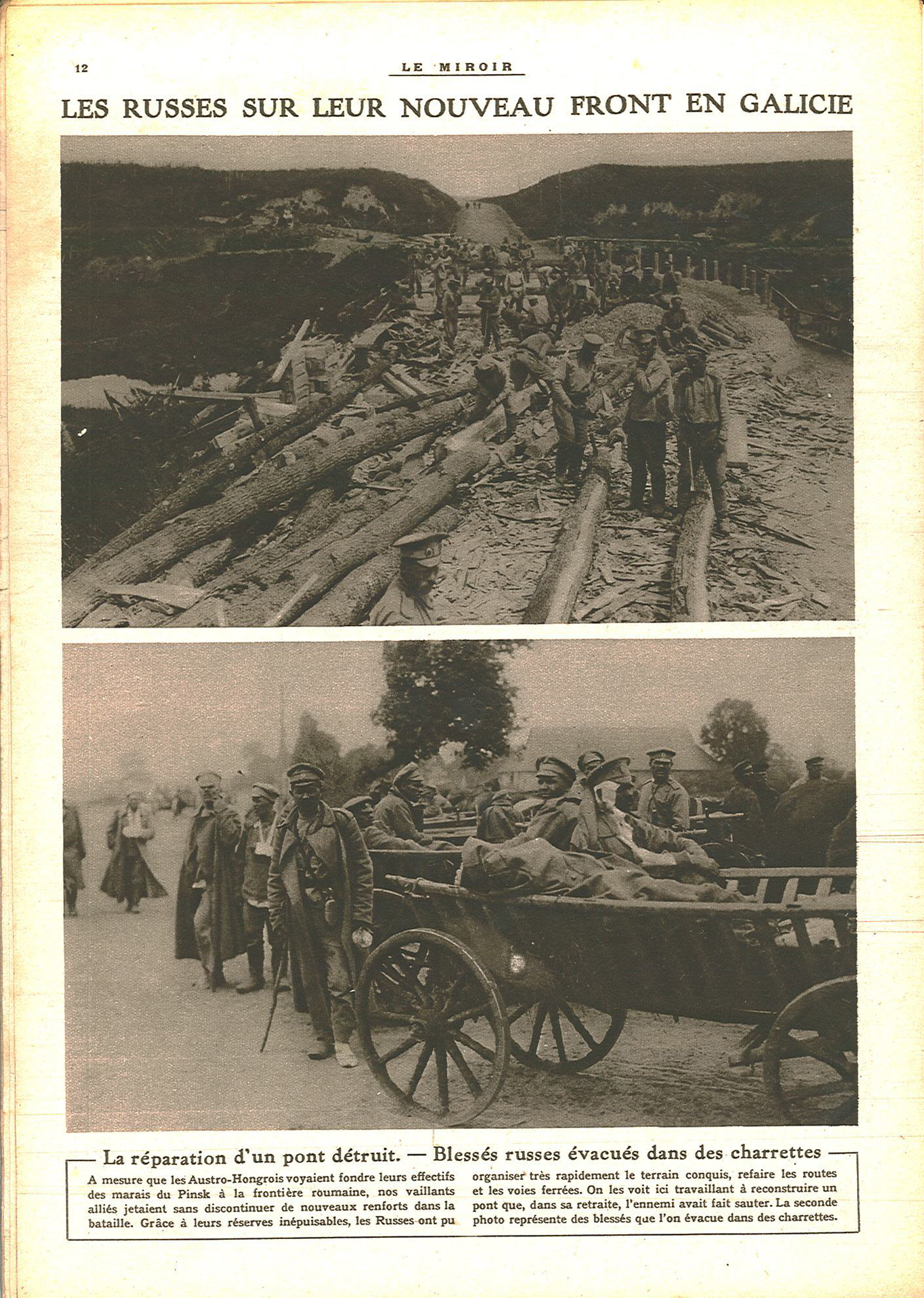
"The Russians on their new front in Galicia", repairing a destroyed bridge and evacuating the wounded by cart, images from the French magazine Le Miroir, August 6, 1916.

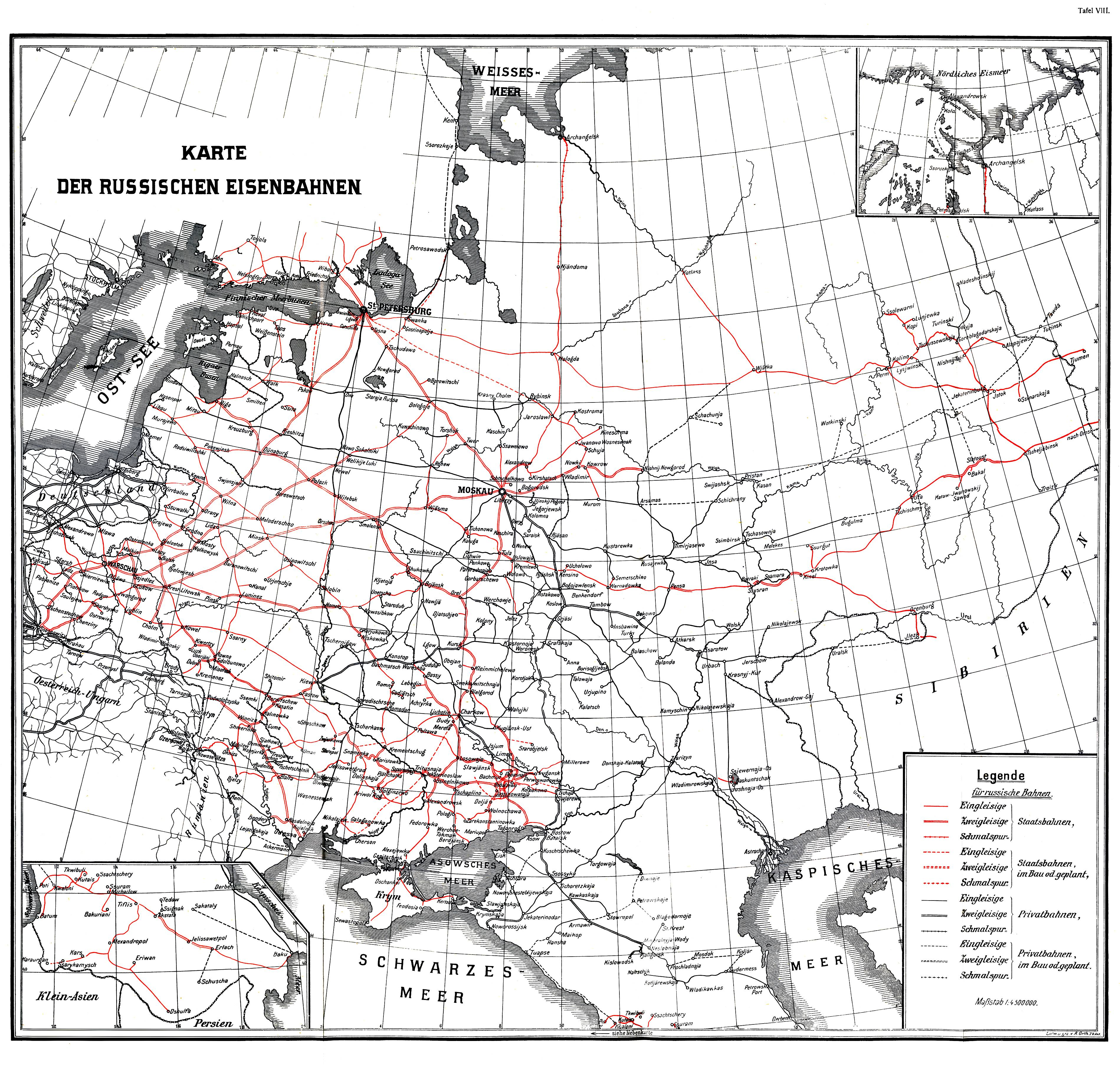
The Russian railway network in 1912.

Russia was one of the major belligerents in World War I: from August 1914 to December 1917, it fought on the Entente's side against the Central Powers.

At the beginning of the 20th century, the Russian Empire was a great power in terms of its vast territory, population, and agricultural resources. Its rail network and industry were developing rapidly, but it had not yet caught up with the Western powers, particularly the German Empire. The Russo-Japanese War of 1904–1905, followed by the Revolution of 1905, revealed the weaknesses of Russia's military apparatus and exposed deep political and social divisions, adding to the question of national minorities.

Russia's rivalries with Germany and Austria-Hungary led to an Franco-Russian Alliance and involvement in Balkan affairs. The July Crisis opened a general conflict in which Russia was allied with France and the United Kingdom.

Tsar Nicholas II believed he could re-establish his autocratic power and reunite his people through a victorious war. However, the army, ill-equipped and ill-prepared for a long battle, suffered a series of defeats in 1914 and 1915: the Empire suffered heavy human and territorial losses. Despite restrictions on international trade, Russia set up a war economy and won partial victories in 1916.

However, the discrediting of the ruling class, inflation and shortages in the cities, and the unsatisfied demands of peasants and national minorities led to the break-up of the country: the revolution of February–March 1917 swept away the Tsar's regime. A provisional government with democratic aspirations attempted to revive the war effort, but the army, undermined by desertions and mutinies, fell apart.

The October–November 1917 revolution led to the dissolution of the army and the economic and social frameworks. The Bolshevik regime signed the Treaty of Brest-Litovsk with Germany on March 3, 1918, abandoning Ukraine, the Baltic countries, and the Caucasus. Torn Russia soon moved from international war to civil war.

== Context ==
=== Great power and its limits ===
On the eve of the Great War, Russia was the most populous state in Europe: with 175 million inhabitants, it had almost 3 times the population of Germany, an army of 1.3 million men, and almost 5 million reservists. Its industrial growth, on the order of 5% per year between 1860 and 1913, and the vastness of its territory and natural resources made it a strategic giant. The Russian railway network grew from 50,000 km in 1900 to 75,000 in 1914. Coal production rose from 6 million tonnes in 1890 to 36 million in 1914. Oil production, thanks to the Baku deposits, was the second largest in the world after the United States. In Germany, Chief of Staff Moltke predicted that, as a result of Russia's rapid growth, German military power would be outclassed by that of its adversaries from 1916 to 1917, while France, strengthened by the Franco-Russian Alliance of 1892, expected the "Russian steamroller" to crush Germany at the first hostile move.

However, this power rested on unstable foundations. Russian industrial production, ranked 4th in the world, surpassed that of France and Austria-Hungary, but lagged far behind that of the top three countries, the United States, the United Kingdom, and Germany. The development of the army, railroads, and industries was largely dependent on government loans, notably from France, and on imports of foreign capital and technology. Interest on the debt, the highest in the world, tended to outstrip the trade surplus. In 1914, 90% of the mining sector, 100% of oil, 40% of metallurgy, and 50% of the chemical industry belonged to foreign firms. Despite high tariffs, the Russian industry was not very competitive, and the country had to import most of its machinery, while exports were mainly represented by agricultural products (63% in 1913) and wood (11%).

In 1914, the agricultural sector still employed 80% of the working population, and its growth rate of around 2% per year was barely enough to offset a population increase of 1.5% per year, especially as a large part of agricultural production was exported to cover industrial imports and debt. Productivity was low, around a third of that of England or Germany for wheat, and half for potatoes. The country suffered famines like the one in 1891, and even in normal years, the Russian settlement regions, with their harsh climate and poor soils, depended on the more fertile non-Russian regions.

Industry, with 3 million workers in 1914, represented only 1.75% of the population, but its rapid growth posed formidable social problems: workers, poorly housed in insalubrious towns, were susceptible to the revolutionary propaganda of Bolshevik or Menshevik socialists, populist socialist-revolutionaries, and anarchists. The peasantry was poorly fed and educated; while the per capita tax taken was higher than in the UK, in 1913 the state spent 970 million rubles on the army and only 154 on health and education. In 1913, 70% of the population was still illiterate. However, primary education progressed rapidly, especially around the big cities: the literacy rate reached 90% among young recruits in 1914 in the Moscow and Saint Petersburg governments. Educated young peasants, better acquainted with new techniques and procedures, became more assertive and sought to escape the grip of the peasant commune and the large landowners.

The intelligentsia also expanded rapidly: the number of students rose from 5,000 in 1860 to 79,000 (45% of them women) in 1914 but failed to close the cultural gap between the masses and the elite.

Economy and society in the Russian Empire before 1914

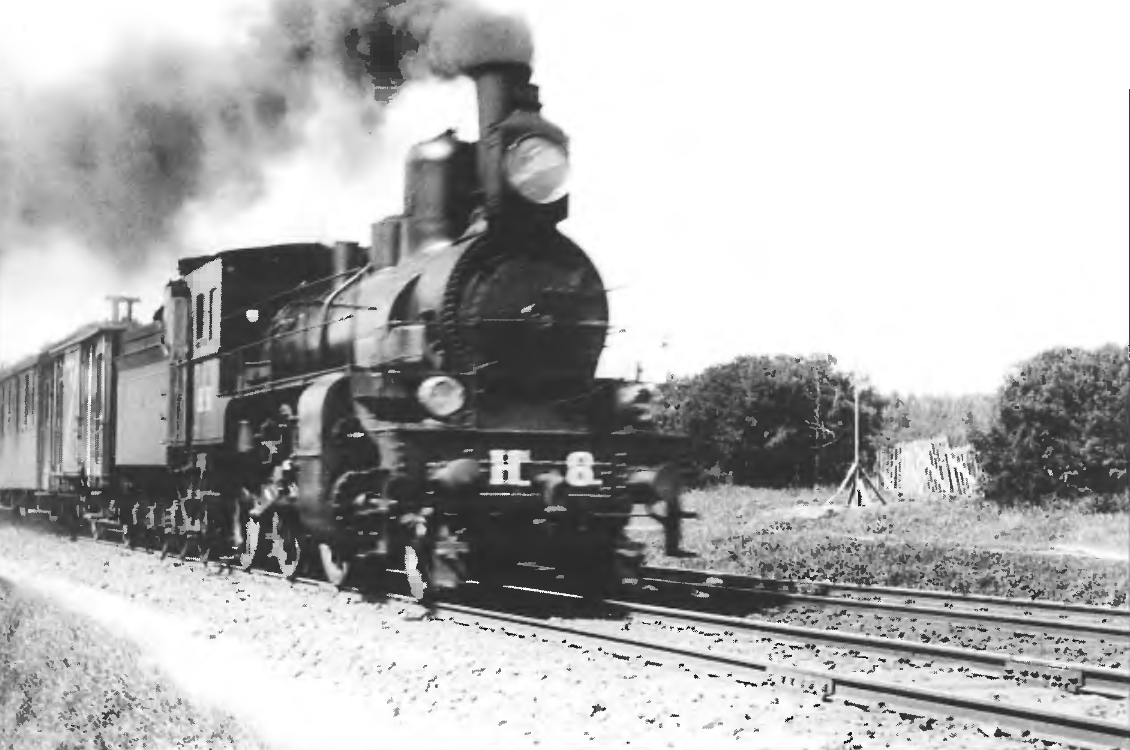
An industrial take-off in progress: Parovoz H locomotive manufactured in Kolomna, 1913.

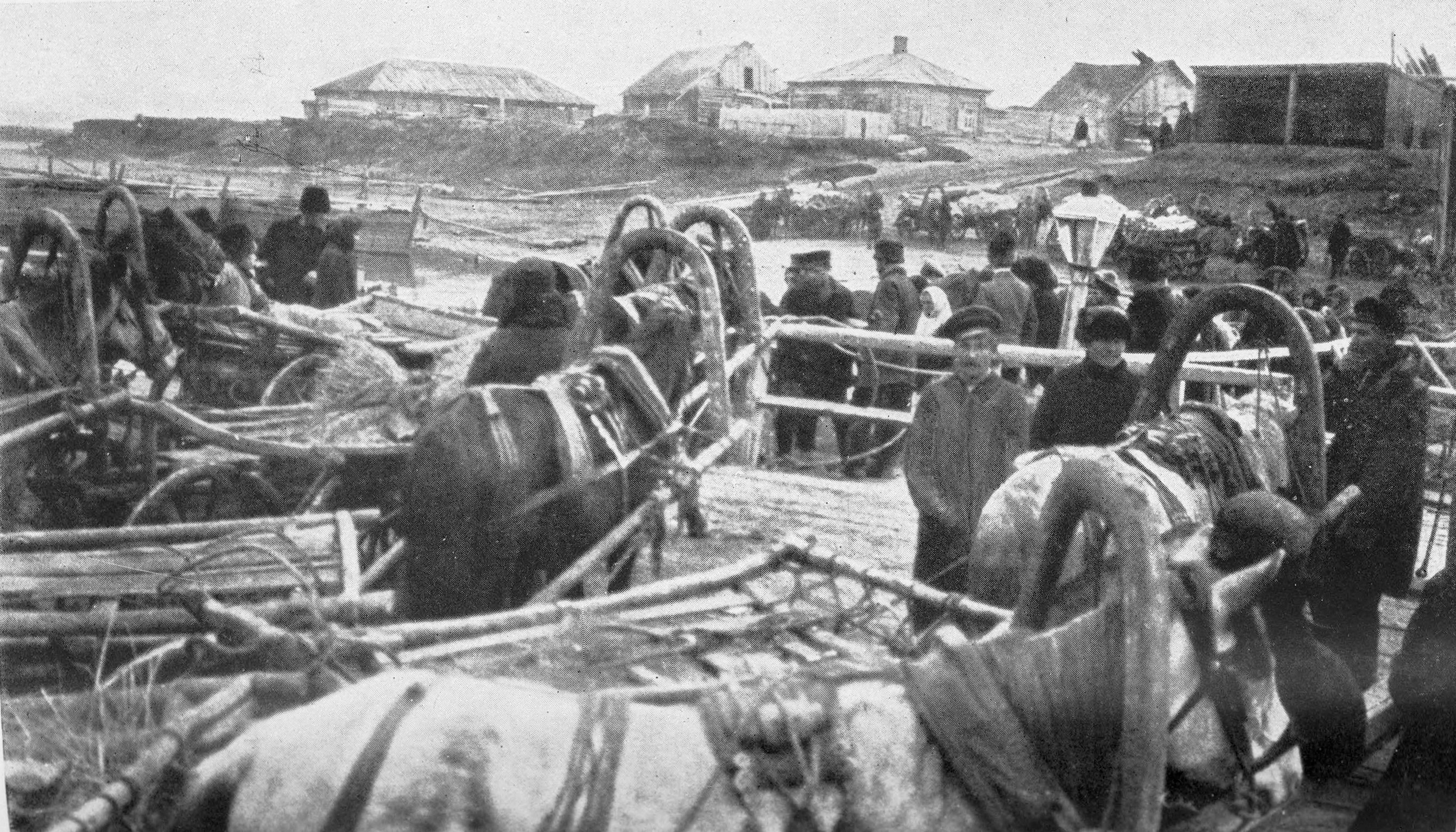
A barge transporting horse-drawn carts on the Yenisei River, 1913.

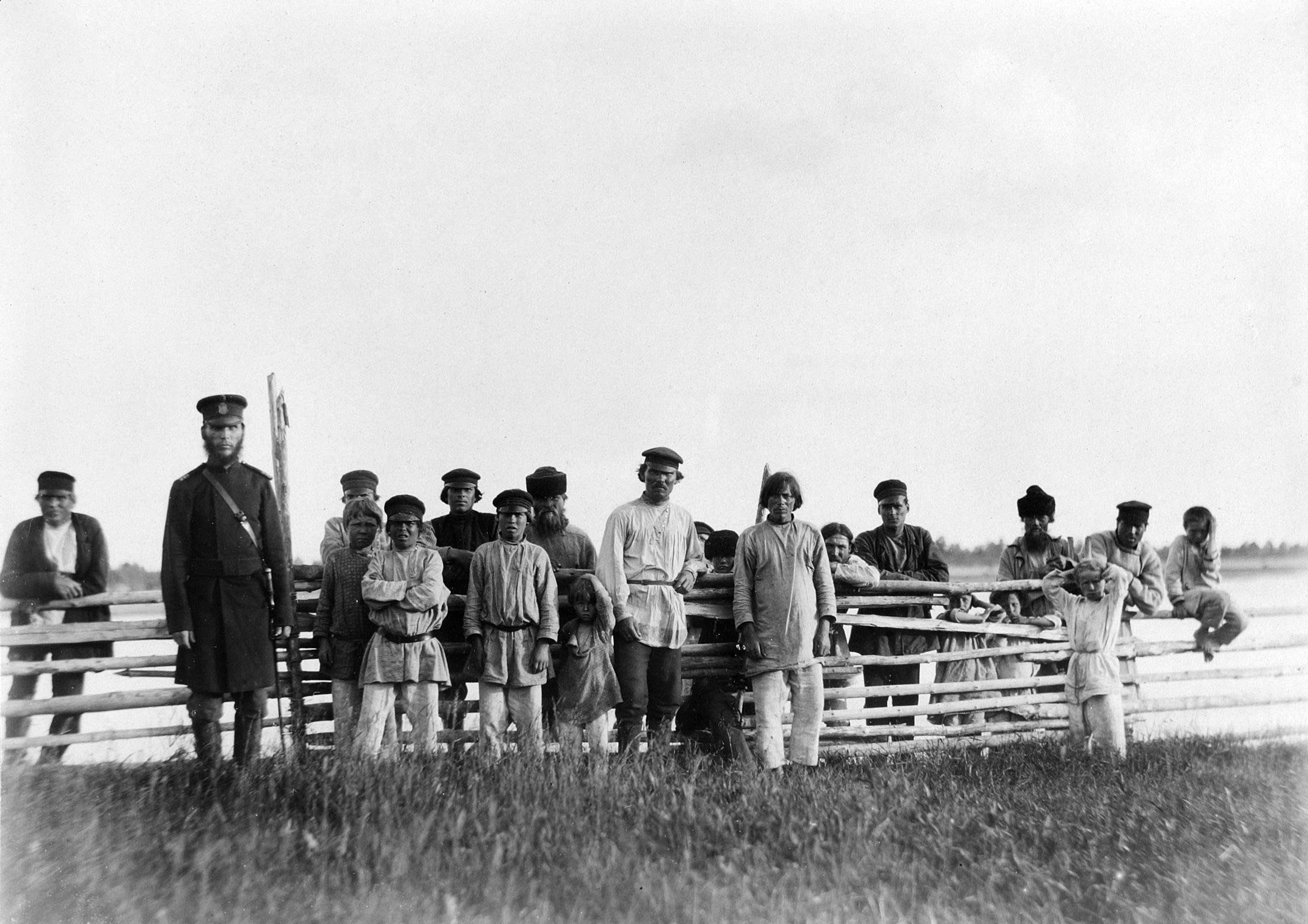
Peasants in Vologda province (northern Russia), 1890.

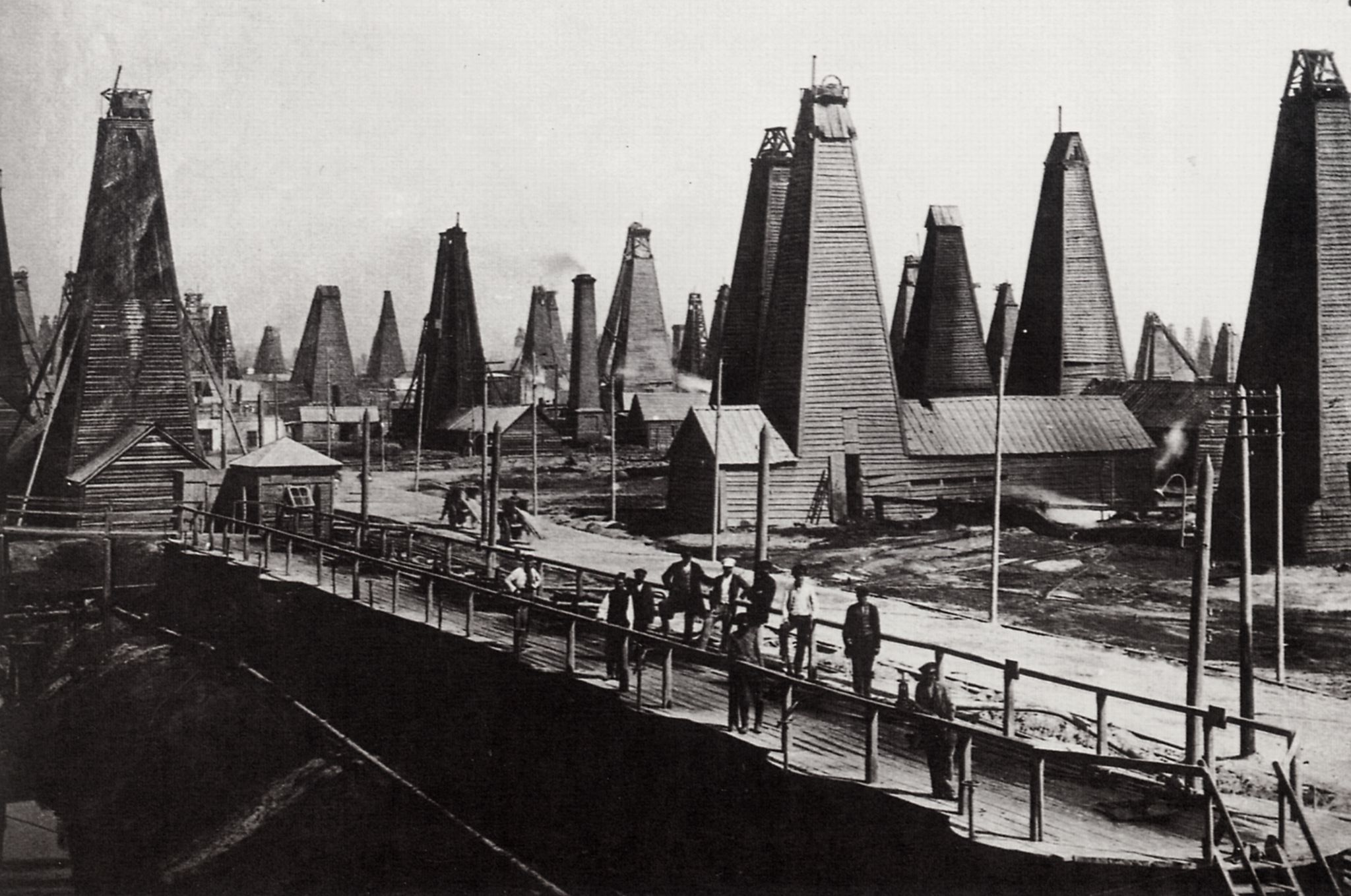
Baku oil well, c. 1890.

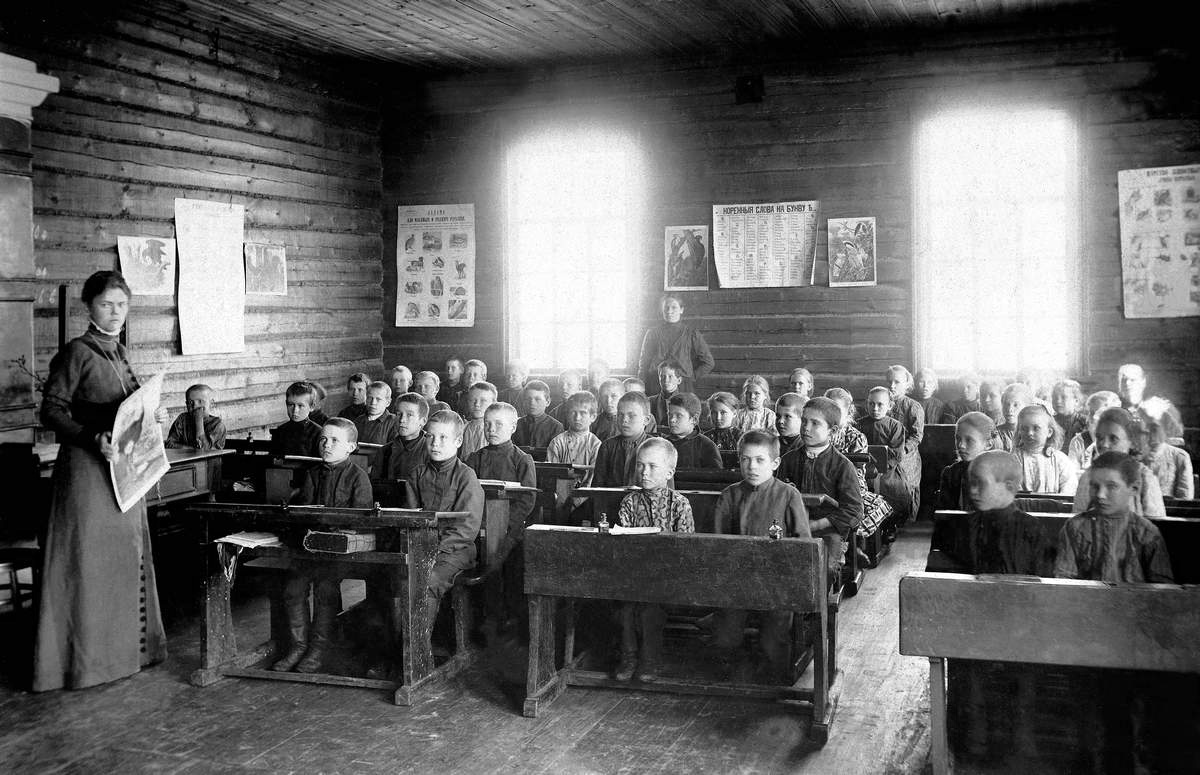
Classroom in a zemstvo school, c. 1908–1912.

=== A divided country ===
A Russian lady, assisted by a clergyman, a doctor and two maids, watches in a nightmare as the Imperial Army is defeated by Japan. Japanese drawing, 1904.

The autocracy of the Romanov dynasty, which in the 19th century seemed to enjoy absolute authority, was increasingly called into question. The Russian famine of 1891–1892 in the Volga and Urals provinces, accompanied by epidemics of cholera and typhus, was badly managed by the authorities, who forbade the dissemination of "alarmist" information and focused on maintaining grain exports. The zemstvos (provincial unions) and intelligentsia mobilized in associations to help the peasants and, once the crisis was over, demanded political rights: it was at this time that many intellectuals, influenced by Tolstoy, converted to revolutionary ideas.

The Russo-Japanese War of 1904–1905 laid bare the structural weaknesses of the Russian military machine and the incompetence of a large part of the high command. On the Manchurian front, army generals sent troops ill-equipped, poorly trained in modern weaponry, and poorly supplied by the interminable Trans-Siberian Railway, to be killed in bayonet charges, while the Baltic Sea fleet, sent to the Pacific, was annihilated by the Japanese at the Battle of Tsushima ( May 27–28, 1905). The liberal bourgeoisie of the zemstvos, which had supported the war effort, became indignant; the industrialist Alexander Guchkov led a campaign to denounce the negligence of the bureaucracy and the military leaders promoted by the favor of the Court.

The discrediting of power and the economic crisis caused by the war against Japan led to the Russian Revolution of 1905, which first broke out in Saint Petersburg in January before spreading to the countryside: around 3,000 manor houses of large landowners (15% of the total) were destroyed by peasants in 1905–1906. In many villages, peasants organized themselves into autonomous communes, demanding universal suffrage and agrarian reform through land distribution. From January to October 1905, the army was sent in no fewer than 2,700 times to put down the revolts; in some cases, the soldiers, themselves of peasant origin, refused to obey and mutinied. Rural unrest was endemic throughout the decade, and the army was sent in to quell it in 1901, 1902, 1903, 1909, and again in 1913.

To save his throne, Nicholas II had to sign the Manifesto of October 17, 1905 (October 30 in the Gregorian calendar), which established a parliament, the State Duma, and freedom of the press and assembly. Piotr Stolypin, appointed Minister of the Interior in April 1906 and Prime Minister in July 1907, promoted a series of reforms: compulsory education, civil rights for Jews and Old Believers, promotion of a class of small landowners through the dismantling of the peasant commune, reform of the administration and the status of workers. This program might have avoided revolution, but would have required, as Stolypin put it, "twenty years of peace". He himself was assassinated in 1911 by a socialist-revolutionary.

Revolt and repression, 1905–1908

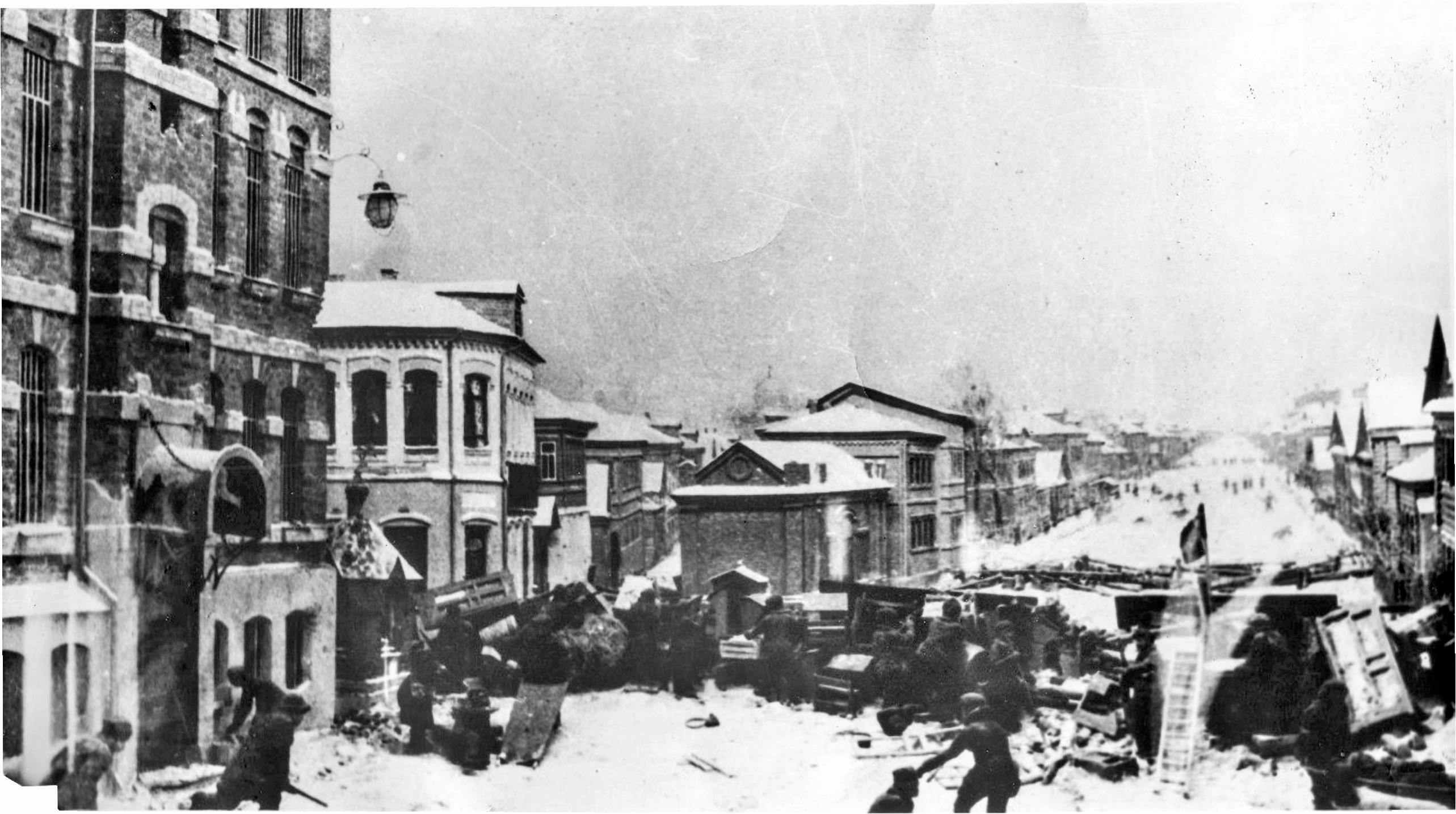
Barricade in the working-class district of Sormovo (Nizhny Novgorod government), December 12, 1905.

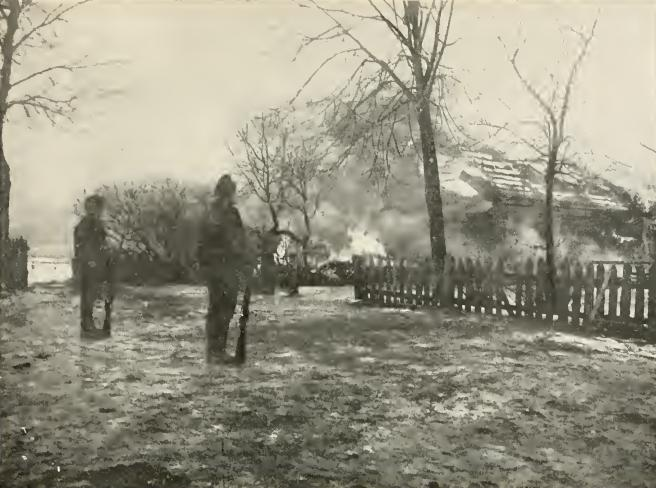
"Pacification": the army burning a rebel peasant's farm in Georgia, 1908.

=== Peoples and nationalities ===
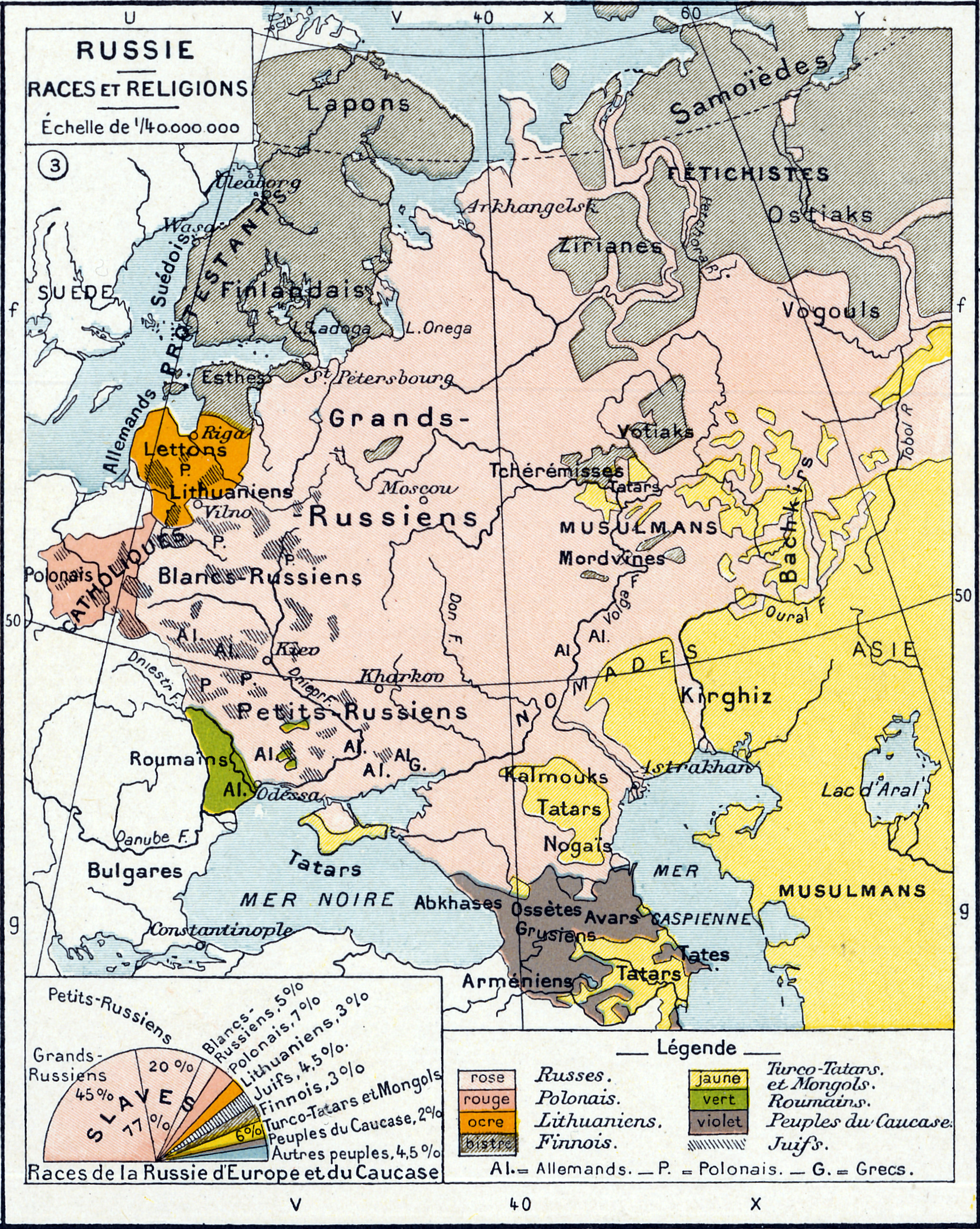
Ethnic map of European Russia before World War I

In a Europe where the principle of the Nation-state was gaining ground, the Russian Empire was increasingly seen as a "prison for the people", even if Lenin only coined the phrase in 1914. Although the Grand Duchy of Finland, annexed by Russia in 1809, retained relative autonomy, the imperial state did nothing to satisfy the autonomist and cultural demands of other peripheral peoples. With the development of the urban middle class, the feeling of identity asserted itself against the Russian state, but also against the former German-Baltic elites in Estonia and Latvia, and the Polish in Lithuania. In Russian Poland, national sentiment, which came from urban culture, spread among workers and peasants, whereas in Ukraine, under the influence of the Ruthenians of Austria-Hungary, whose cultural rights were much more assertive, it mainly affected the peasantry, the urban population being more Russian (or Russified), Polish, German or Jewish.

To counteract revolutionary currents, reactionary circles encouraged the creation of monarchist, anti-socialist, and anti-Semitic parties, the most important being the Union of the Russian People; these groups, known generically as the Black Hundreds, organized a series of pogroms from 1905 onwards. The Tsar himself supported them.

=== Panslavism and the German threat ===
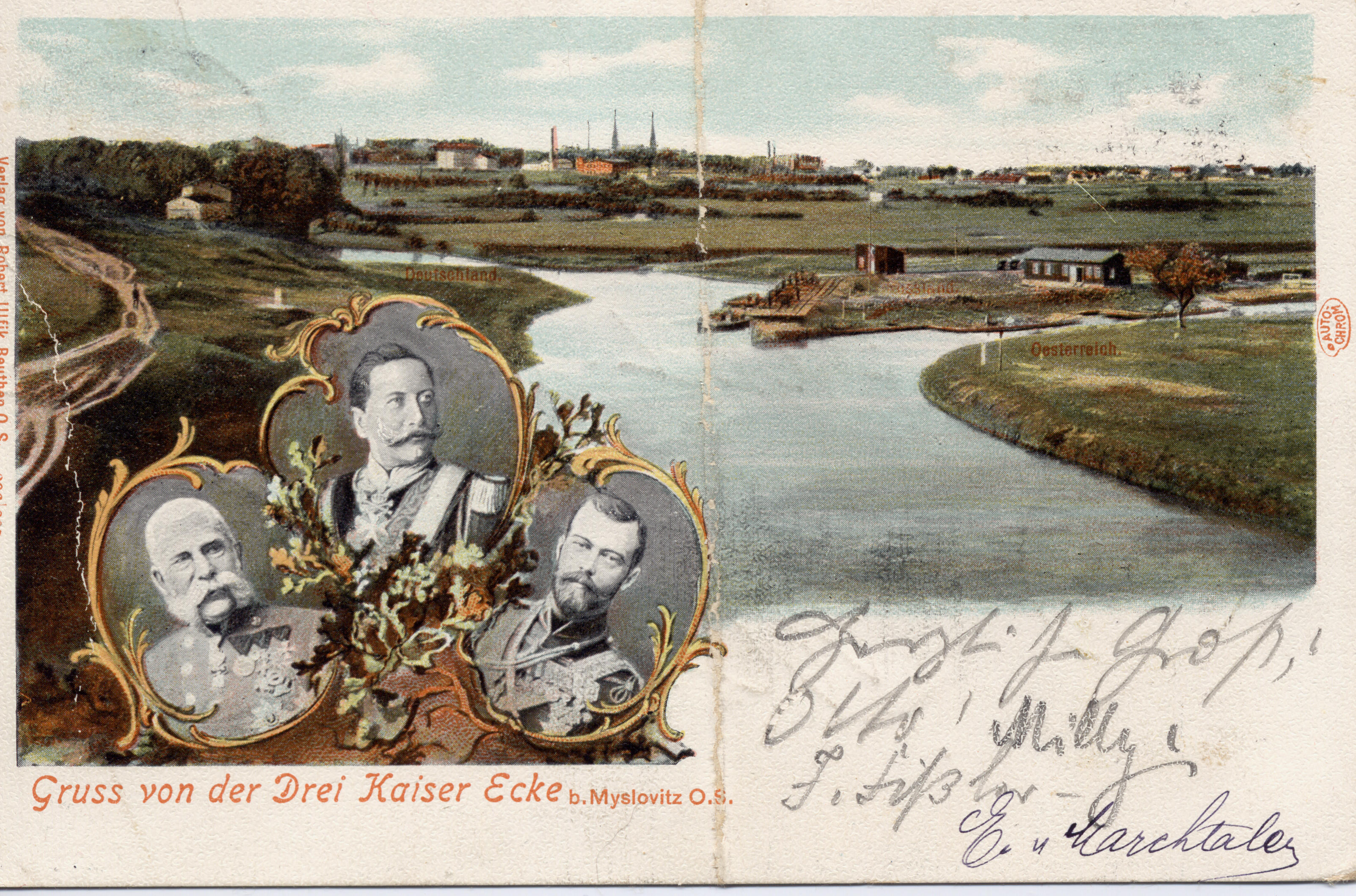
In the days of the friendship of the three emperors: Franz Joseph of Austria-Hungary, Wilhelm II of Germany and Nicholas II of Russia. Postcard of the Triple Frontier, 1902.

The greater freedom of expression after 1905, in politics and the press, also allowed for the free expression of Grand-Russian nationalism, Panslavism, and anti-Germanism. The latter was fueled by the advantageous social position of the Germans in Russia, among whom were many wealthy landowners, high-ranking civil servants and court dignitaries (Empress Alexandra Fedorovna was German), and by the superiority of the German Empire's economy, which flooded Russia with its capital and industrial products. In 1914, an editorialist in the Novoye Vremya newspaper wrote: "In the last twenty years, our western neighbor [Germany] has held the vital sources of our prosperity firmly in her fangs and, like a vampire, has sucked the blood of the Russian peasant". On the eve of the war, Germany accounted for 47% of Russia's international trade. In 1915, a Russian officer explained to American journalist John Reed why Russian peasants were "full of patriotism" to fight the Germans: "They hate the Germans. You see, most agricultural machinery comes from Germany, and these machines have deprived many peasants of their work, sending them to factories in Petrograd, Moscow, Riga, and Odessa. Not to mention the fact that the Germans are flooding Russia with cheap products, causing our factories to close and putting thousands of workers out of work." Skeptical John Reed notes, however, that Russian peasants have even more reason to resent their overlords than the Germans.

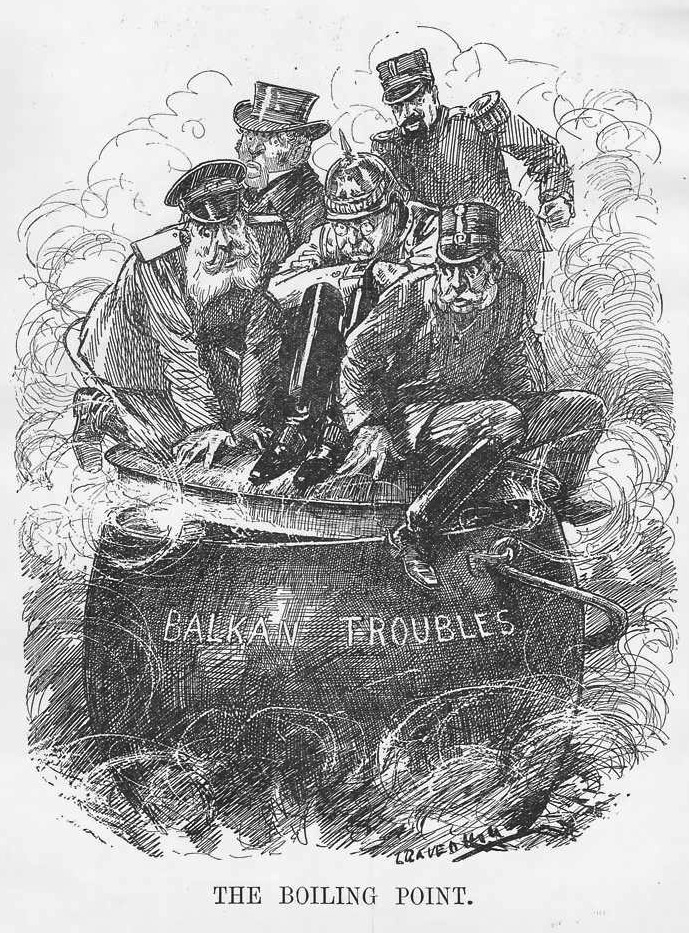
"The boiling point": Russia, Germany and Austria-Hungary worried about Balkan unrest. British cartoon in The Punch, October 2, 1912.

However, Russia's educated circles were also concerned about Wilhelm II's global policy, which aimed to extend German military and colonial power around the world, and about that of Austria-Hungary, Germany's ally, with its ambitions in the Balkans. During the Bosnian Crisis of 1908, Alexander Guchkov, leader of the moderate Octobrist party, denounced the lack of Russian reaction to the annexation of Bosnia-Herzegovina by the dual monarchy as a "diplomatic Tsushima". Moderate, liberal and right-wing parties called for firmness in the face of the Austro-German alliance. The threat of Pangermanism fueled Panslavism among some Russian elites. At the Panslav Congress in Prague in July 1908, delegates from the Russian Duma proposed that the Slavs of Austria-Hungary and the Balkans form a federation with Russia. Supporters of Panslavism formed societies to support Slavic "brother peoples" against the Ottoman Empire during the Balkan Wars of 1912–1913. In 1912, Prince Grigori Trubetskoi, in charge of Ottoman and Balkan affairs at the Ministry of Foreign Affairs, favored the extension of Russian hegemony over the Balkans and Constantinople. Grand Duke Nicholas Nikolayevich, uncle of the Tsar and son-in-law of King Nicholas of Montenegro, was also won over to the Panslave cause.

Aleksandr Guchkov, who had become chairman of the Duma's Defense Committee, supported a massive rearmament program, but made it conditional on a reform of the high command: he demanded that the Imperial Russian Navy staff be placed under the control of the government rather than the Court, and that promotions be based on merit rather than favor. Nicholas II only reluctantly agreed to this reform, at the insistence of his Prime Minister Stolypin, and with parliamentary confirmation of his title as Supreme Chief of the Armed Forces.

However, Russian leaders were aware of the risk of war with Germany. The General Staff and Foreign Minister Sergei Sazonov believed that the army would not be ready until 1917. In February 1914, Interior Minister Pyotr Durnovo wrote a memorandum to the Tsar stating that a war could only exacerbate political and social tensions in Russia and lead to a devastating revolution. Conversely, Lenin, then in exile, wrote to Maxim Gorki in 1913: "A war between Austria and Russia would be very favorable to the revolution, but it is unlikely that Franz Joseph and Nikolacha [Nicholas II] would give us this pleasure".

== Russia at war ==
=== Entering the war ===
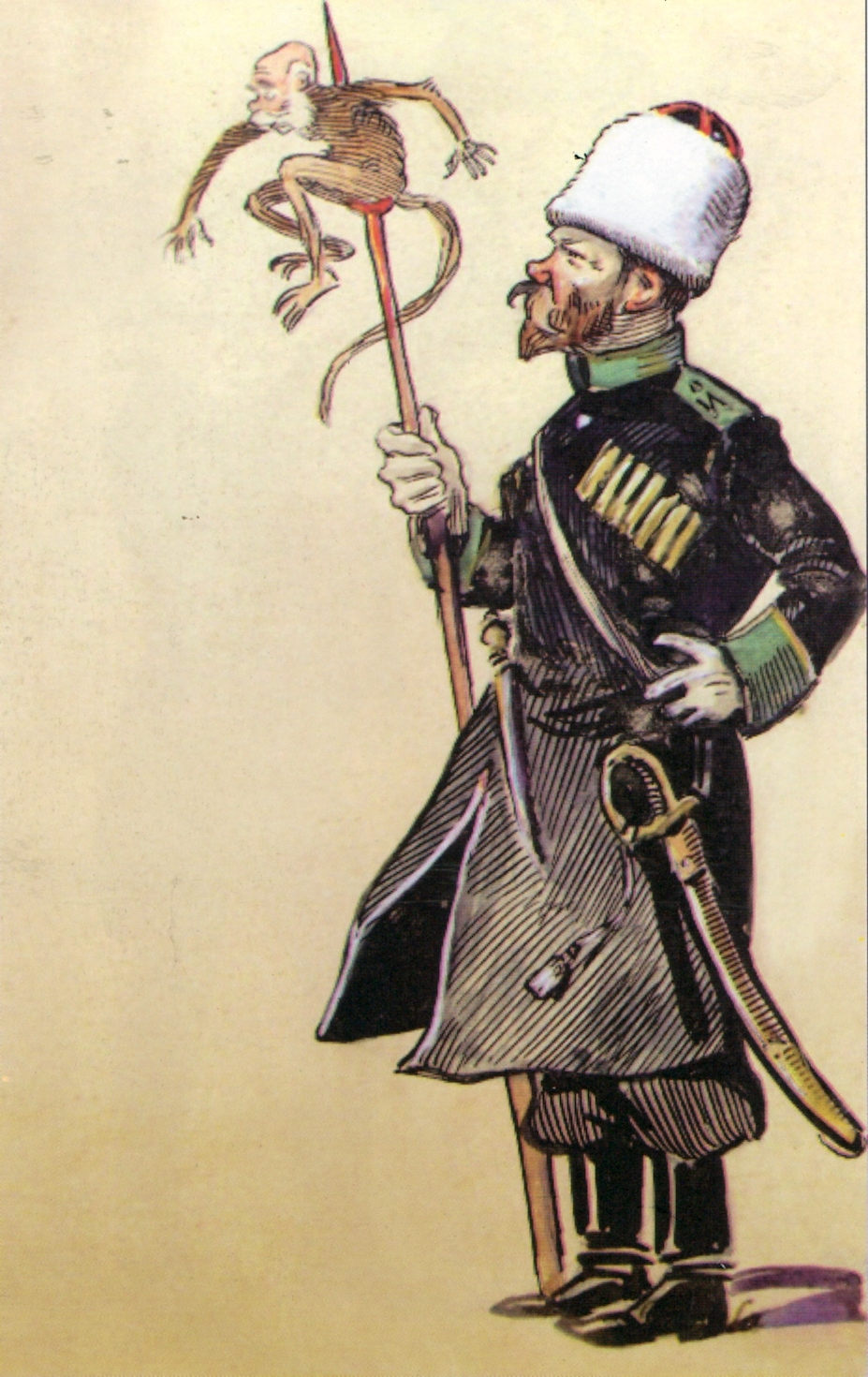
Nicholas II skewering Austro-Hungarian Emperor Franz Joseph, Romanian cartoon by Nicolae Petrescu-Găină, n.d.

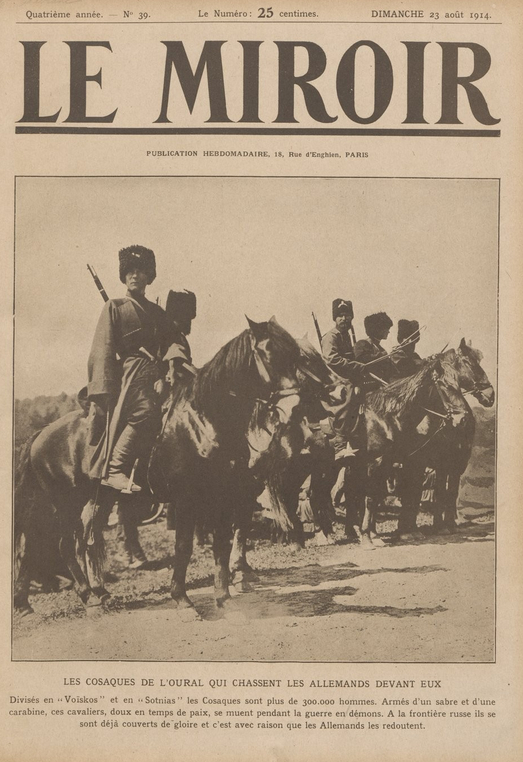
"Les Cosaques de l'Oural qui chassent les Allemands devant eux", propaganda image from the French magazine Le Miroir, August 23, 1914.

The assassination on June 28, 1914, and the Austro-Hungarian ultimatum to Serbia on July 23 prompted Russia to support its Serbian ally against the dual monarchy (Austria-Hungary). Large demonstrations gathered in front of the Austro-Hungarian embassy in St. Petersburg. On July 24, at the Council of Ministers, Agriculture Minister Alexander Krivochein (en) declared: "Public opinion would not understand why, at a critical moment involving Russia's interests, the imperial government was reluctant to act boldly". Foreign Minister Sergei Sazonov warned the Tsar that "if he did not give in to the people's demands for war and draw the sword in the name of Serbia, he would run the risk of a revolution and even the loss of his throne". On July 30, Nicholas II resigned himself to ordering general mobilization: Germany, which had done the same, declared war on Russia on August 1. Opposition parties rallied to the cause of national defense, strikes, which had been numerous since 1912, came to a halt, and crowds ransacked the German embassy in St. Petersburg. On August 2, a large crowd gathered in front of the Winter Palace to acclaim the emperor, kneeling and singing the hymn "God Save the Tsar". Most of the demonstrators were middle-class people or employees who had come by order, but Nicholas II believed he had re-united his people and confided to his children's tutor: "I'm sure that there will now be a movement in Russia similar to that of the Great War of 1812". On August 8, the Duma decided to dissolve itself until the end of hostilities, to avoid embarrassing the government.

=== War aims to be defined ===
On August 14, 1914, Grand Duke Nicholas Nikolayevich, head of the Russian army, appealed to the Slavic peoples of Austria-Hungary to join Russia. To cut short Austro-German attempts to raise Russian Poland, he called for "the rebirth under this [Russian] scepter of a Poland free of its faith, its language and with the right to govern itself". This proclamation, approved in secret by the Tsar and the Council of Ministers, soon proved to be at odds with the reality of the Russian occupation of Poland. The Russians, who occupied Eastern Galicia after the Austro-Hungarian army's debacle at the Battle of Lemberg, pursued a policy of Russification, installing Russian civil servants and closing 3,000 Polish and Ruthenian schools.

=== The Ottoman gate closure ===
The Ottoman Empire, which had remained on the sidelines during the July crisis, was slow to commit itself to one side or the other in the developing war. However, it was thinking of taking revenge for the treaties of 1878 and, on August 2, signed a secret German-Ottoman alliance treaty. The arrival of the German cruisers Goeben and Breslau, which on 10 August had taken refuge in the Turkish Straits from the British Royal Navy, altered the balance of power in the Black Sea: Wilhelm II sold the cruisers, their crews, and commanders to the Sultan. On August 27, the Ottoman Empire denounced the Straits Convention and closed the Dardanelles to foreign trade; on 8 September it abrogated the capitulations; it also closed all foreign jurisdictions and post offices. With the Baltic Sea already under German control, the Ottoman blockade of the Black Sea interrupted maritime links between Russia and its allies. On 29 October, on the orders of the Ottoman War Minister Enver Pasha, the German-Ottoman fleet bombarded the Russian Black Sea ports of Odessa, Sevastopol, and Novorossiysk: Russia reacted by declaring war on the Ottoman Empire on November 2, followed by France and the United Kingdom on November 5.

On the Caucasus front, the Ottoman offensive of Sarıkamış of December 1914 to January 1915 proved a total disaster for the Turks: the ill-equipped Ottoman army lost two corps to cold and disease — more than to fighting. However, the British offensive in the Dardanelles, first by sea in February 1915 and then by land on the Gallipoli Peninsula from March 1915 to January 1916, resulted in stalemate and an Entente retreat. In 1915 and 1916, the Russian Black Sea Fleet carried out several operations in the Black Sea without succeeding in unblocking the Straits.

The new fronts of conflict

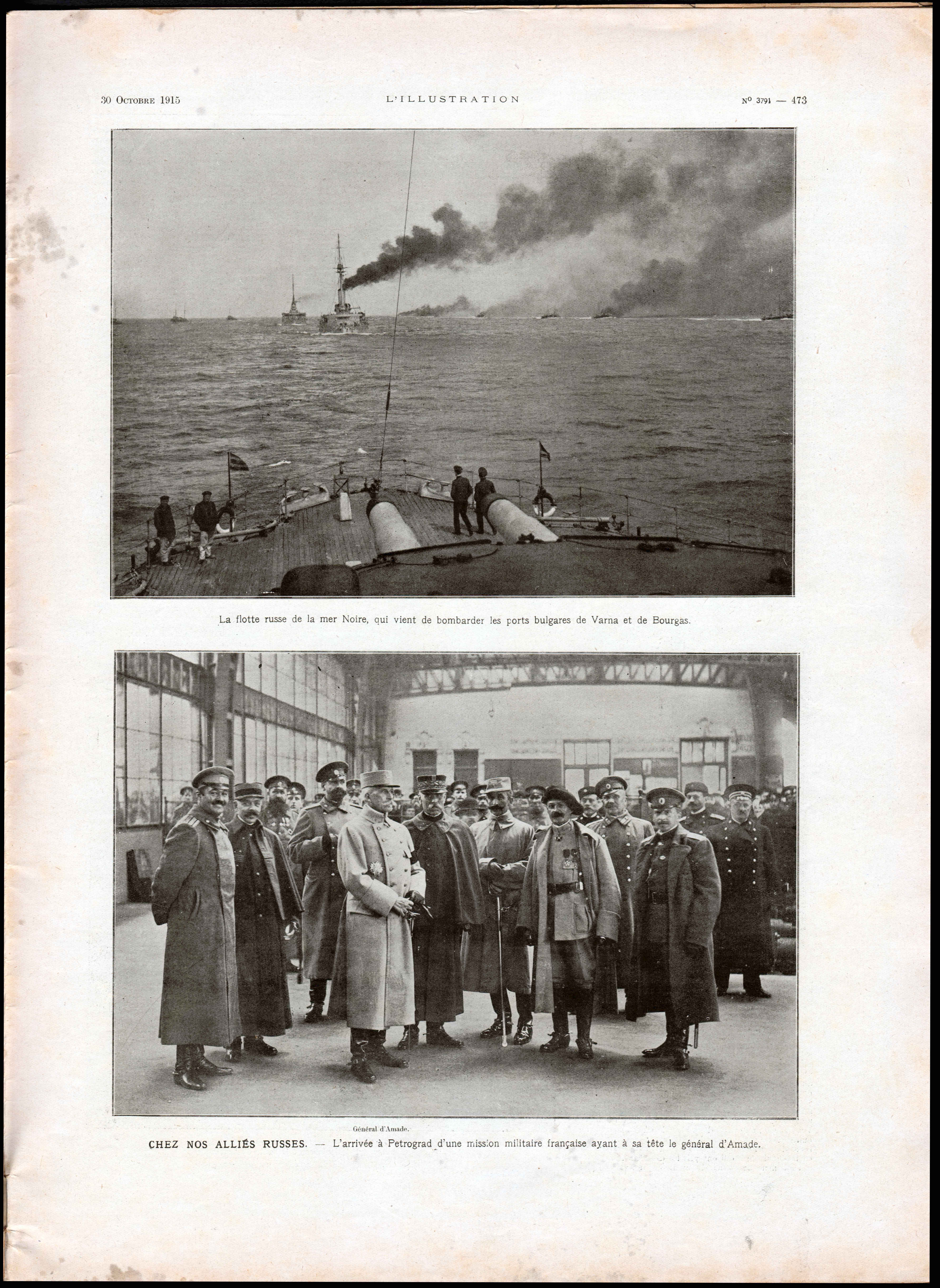
"With our Russian allies": the Imperial Russian Navy in the Black Sea bombs Varna in Bulgaria, which has just joined the Central Empires (top); arrival in Petrograd of General Albert d'Amade's French military mission (bottom). Images from the French magazine L'Illustration, October 30, 1915.

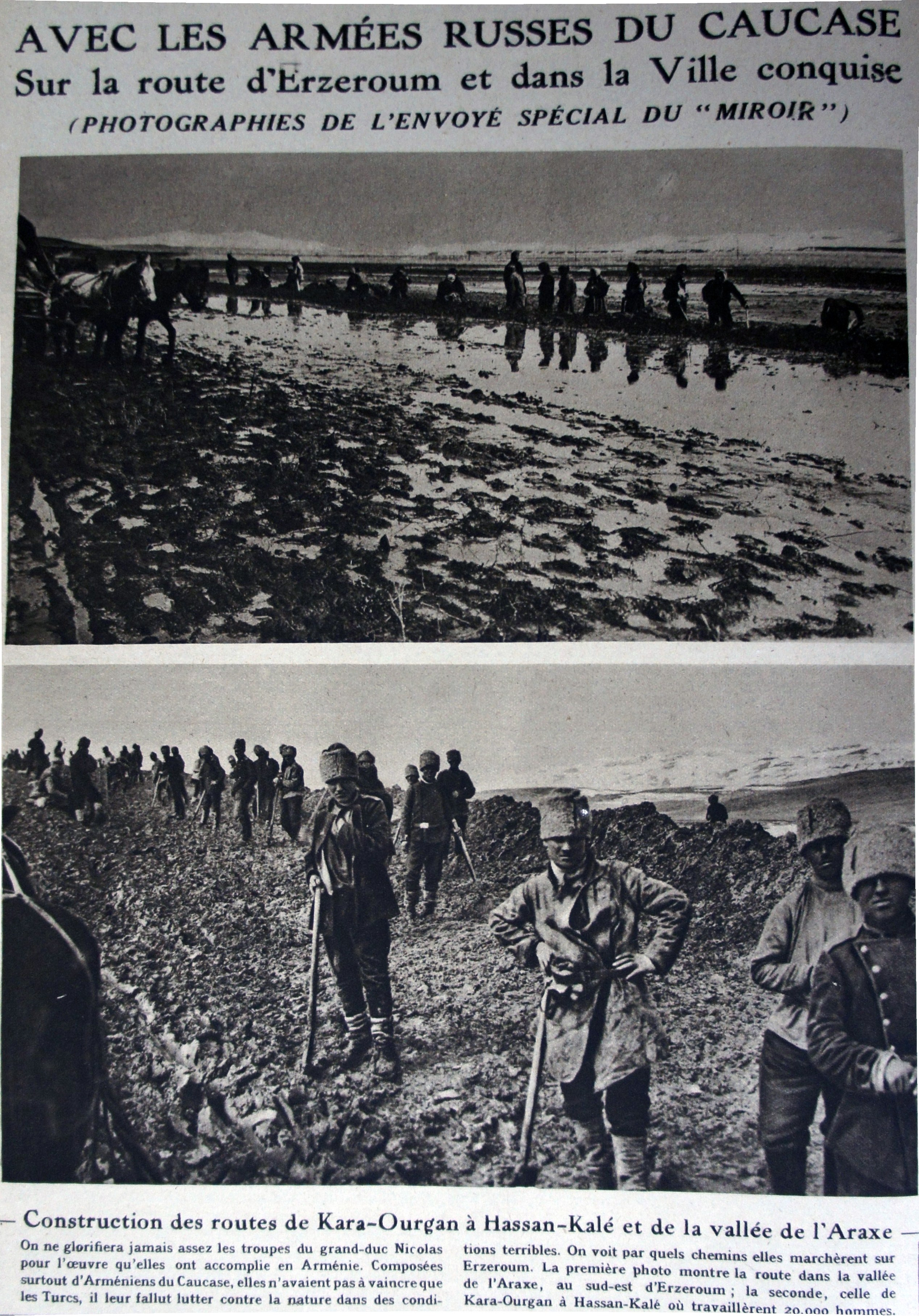
"With the Russian armies in the Caucasus", road-building by Armenian volunteers during the Battle of Erzurum, Le Miroir, May 14, 1916.

In November 1916 Russian commanders revived long-standing Russian plans to capture the Bosphorus. However, the Bosphorus Operation (Russian: Босфорская операция), scheduled for April 1917, never took place: in December 1916 the Russian Stavka had to divert troops and transport ships to support the Romanian campaign, and subsequently the March 1917 February Revolution in Russia supervened.

=== The test of war ===
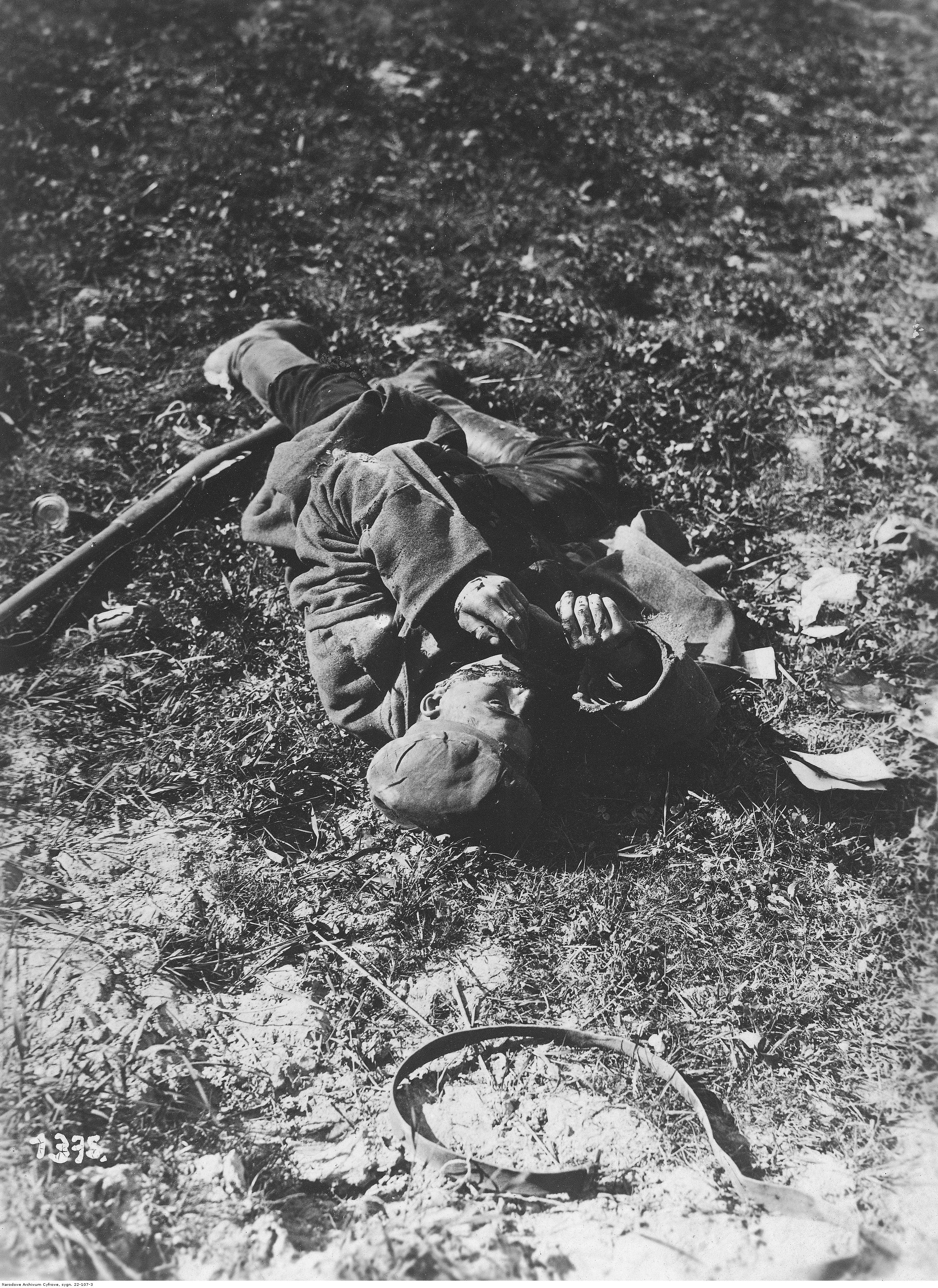
Russian soldier killed, c. 1914–1918).

Eastern Front in 1914.

The initial enthusiasm of the authorities was scarcely shared by the people: several foreign observers noted that there were no crowds or bands at the stations to cheer the troops and that the peasant recruits set off with a resigned air. From the very first weeks of the war, some soldiers made no secret of their bad mood: "Who the hell brought this war on us? We're interfering in other people's business", "We're from Tambov, the Germans won't go that far", "Let them go and fight themselves. Just a little longer, and we'll settle the score with you." Most had only the vaguest idea of the causes of the war and didn't know what Serbia was, or even Germany.

Under the tutelage of General Sukhomlinov, Minister of War since 1909, Russia had acquired large quantities of armaments, but the military command remained dominated by generals from the court nobility and the Guard cavalry, with little command of modern military techniques. Grand Duke Nikolayevich, the nominal head of the armed forces, was no military expert. Coordination was poor between the Ministry, the General Staff (Stavka) based in Baranavitchy, and the front commanders.

In 1914, the entire army had just 679 motorized vehicles, and most transport was by cart. The 2nd Army, which was to play a decisive role in the offensive in the province of East Prussia, had only 25 field telephones and a telegraph that often broke down, forcing it to send couriers to collect telegrams from the Warsaw post office. The Russian general staff, like that of the other belligerents, had counted on a short war: the ammunition reserve, 7 million shells at the start of the conflict, soon proved insufficient, while the Ministry had not drawn up a war production plan. From the start of 1915, recruits had to train without rifles and, when they went to the front, had to wait to collect weapons from the men they had killed. No one envisaged that the war would last beyond autumn, and there were not even sufficient stocks of winter clothing for the Battle of the Carpathians. Soldiers lacked shoes and harnesses because almost all the tannin for leather was imported from Germany. Equipment imported from the Allies and the United States arrived only slowly; it was very heterogeneous and, by the end of the war, the infantry was using 10 different calibers. Most generals misunderstood the logic of Attrition warfare and neglected to dig trenches, or were content with a single superficial line. Aleksei Brusilov, head of the 8th Army, was one of the few commanders to prescribe a triple line of defense but found that his subordinates neglected his instructions.

The Russian army, poorly supplied and often poorly commanded, was routed by the great offensives of the Central Powers in 1915: Austro-Hungarians and Germans in Galicia, Germans alone in central Poland. The great Russian fortresses of Ivangorod, Novogeorgievsk, Grodno, Osowiec, and Kovno, surrounded and shelled by German heavy artillery, had to capitulate with their painstakingly replenished ammunition stocks. The "scorched earth" strategy ordered by the Russian general staff led to the destruction of factories, warehouses, and silos, while hundreds of thousands of civilians were evacuated in a panic to the east. The loss of Russian Poland deprived the Empire of 10% of its iron and steel production and 50% of its chemical industry.

A time of disaster, 1914–1915

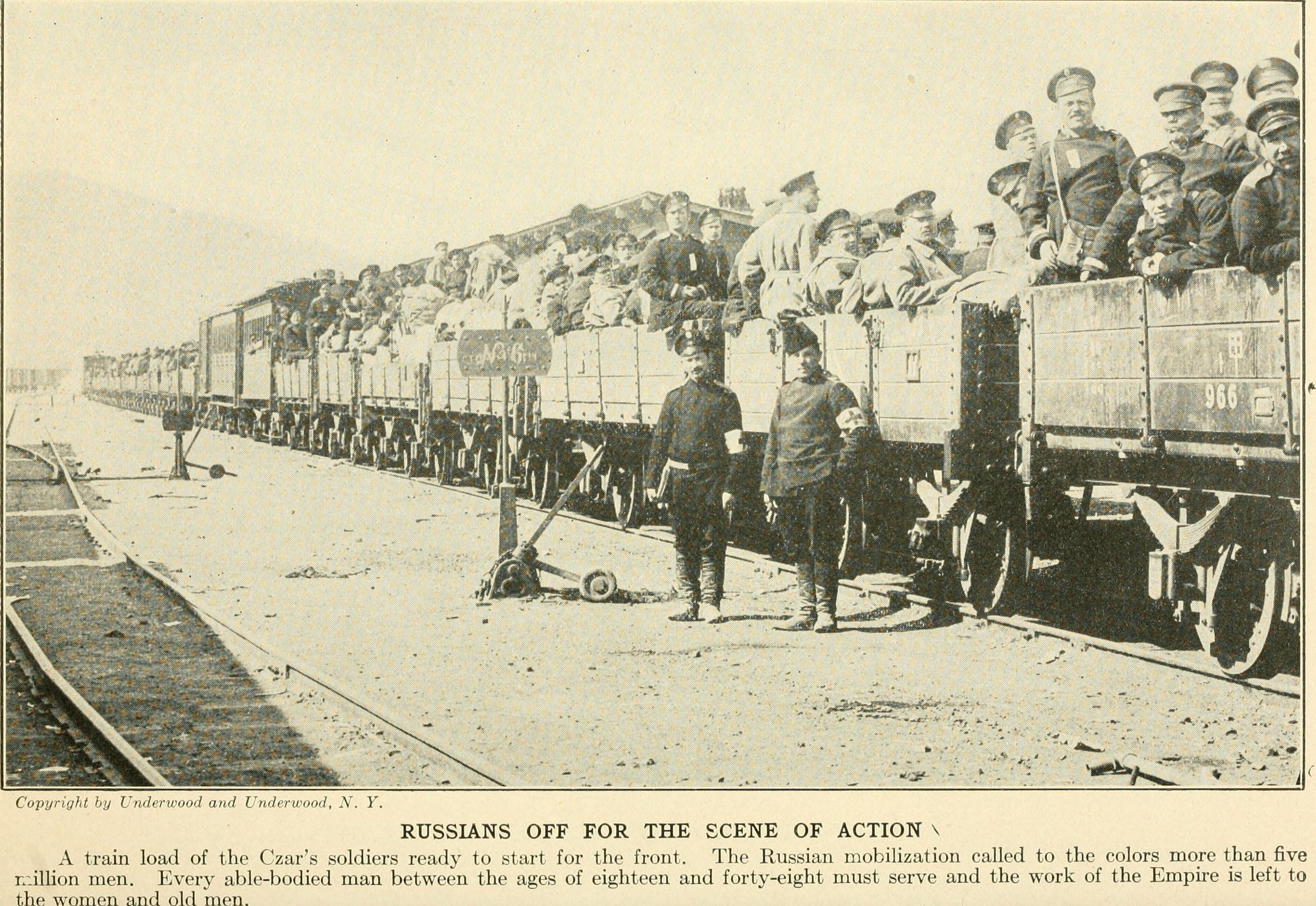
Train carrying Russian soldiers to the front. Photograph by Charles Morris, August 1914.

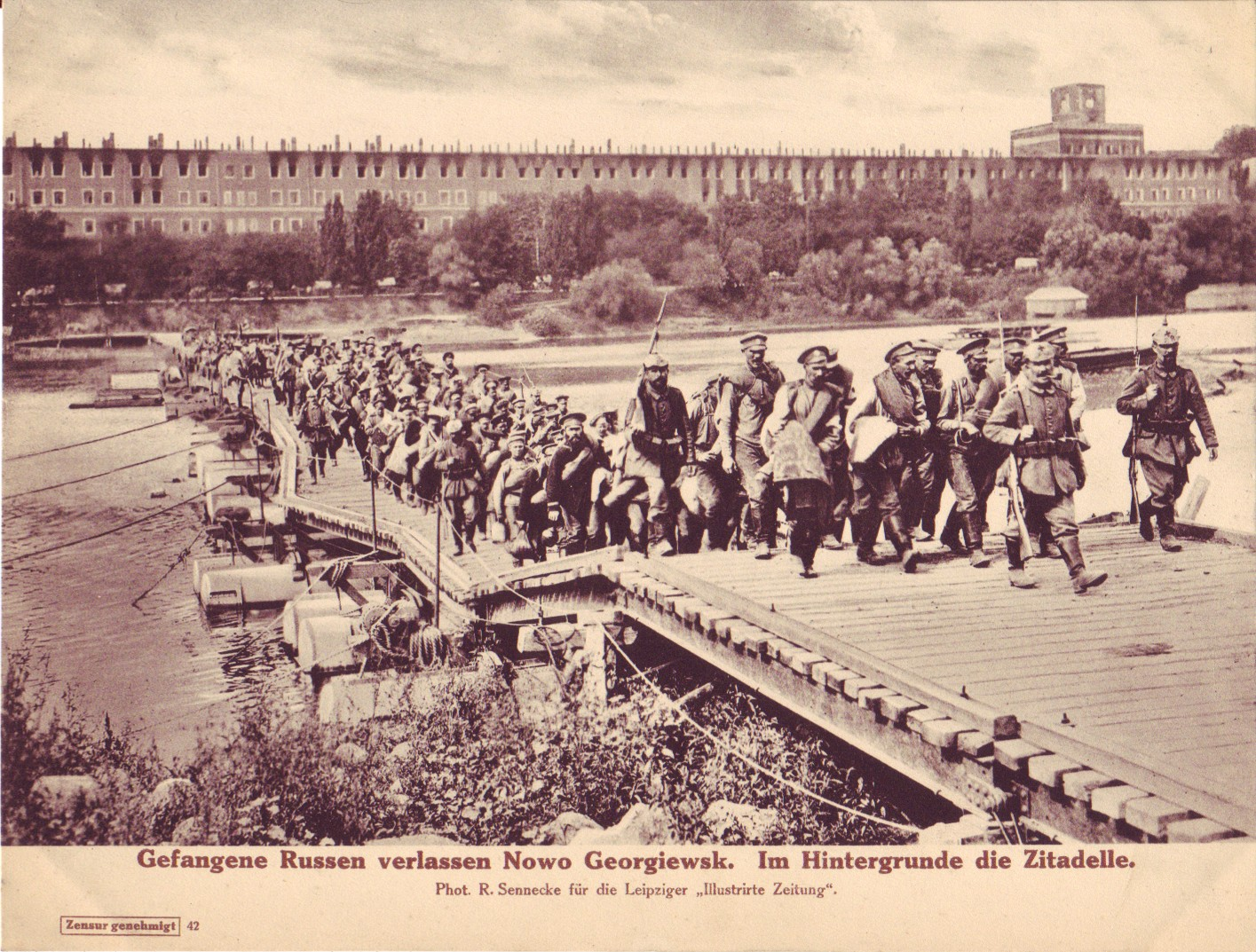
Russian prisoners of war led by German soldiers after the surrender of the Novogeorgievsk fortress, August 1915.

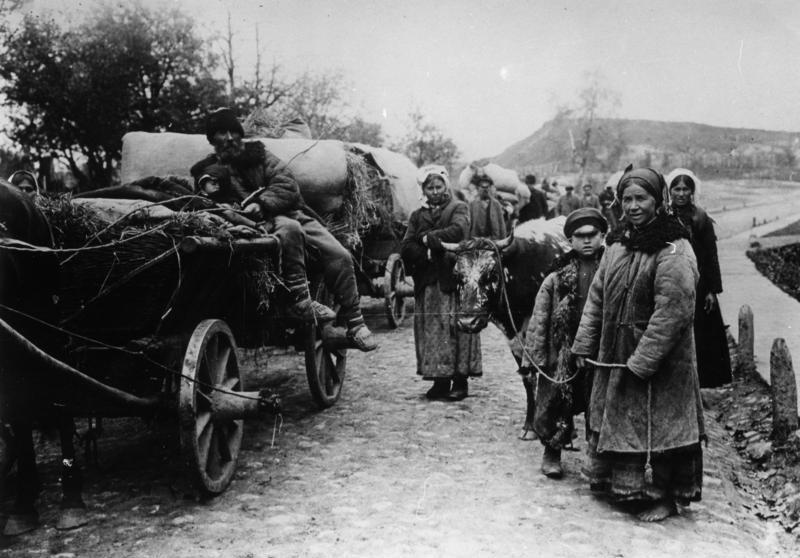
Russian peasants evacuated during the Great Retreat, November 1915.

=== A constant stream of men ===
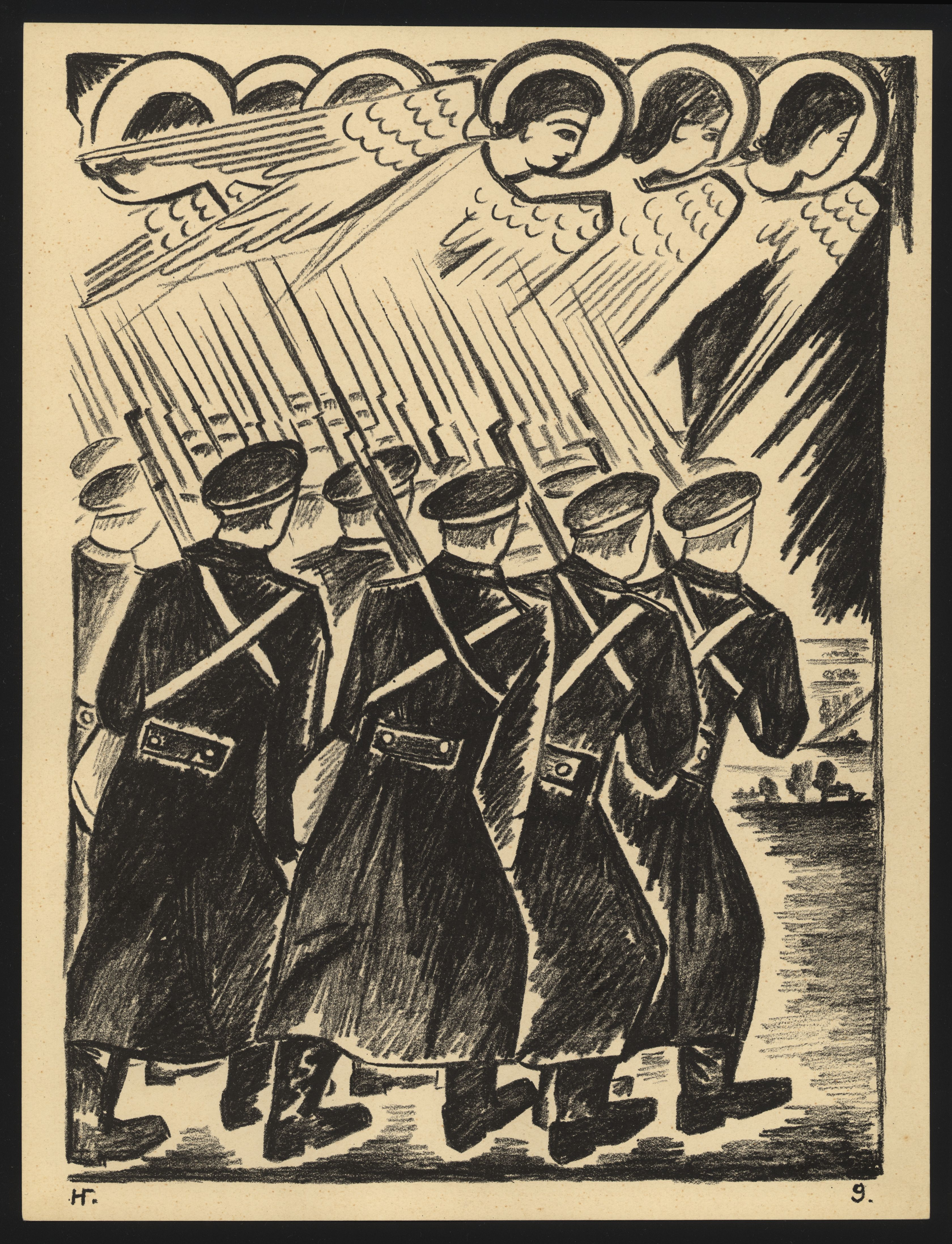
Soldiers accompanied by angels, drawing by Nathalie Goncharova, 1914.

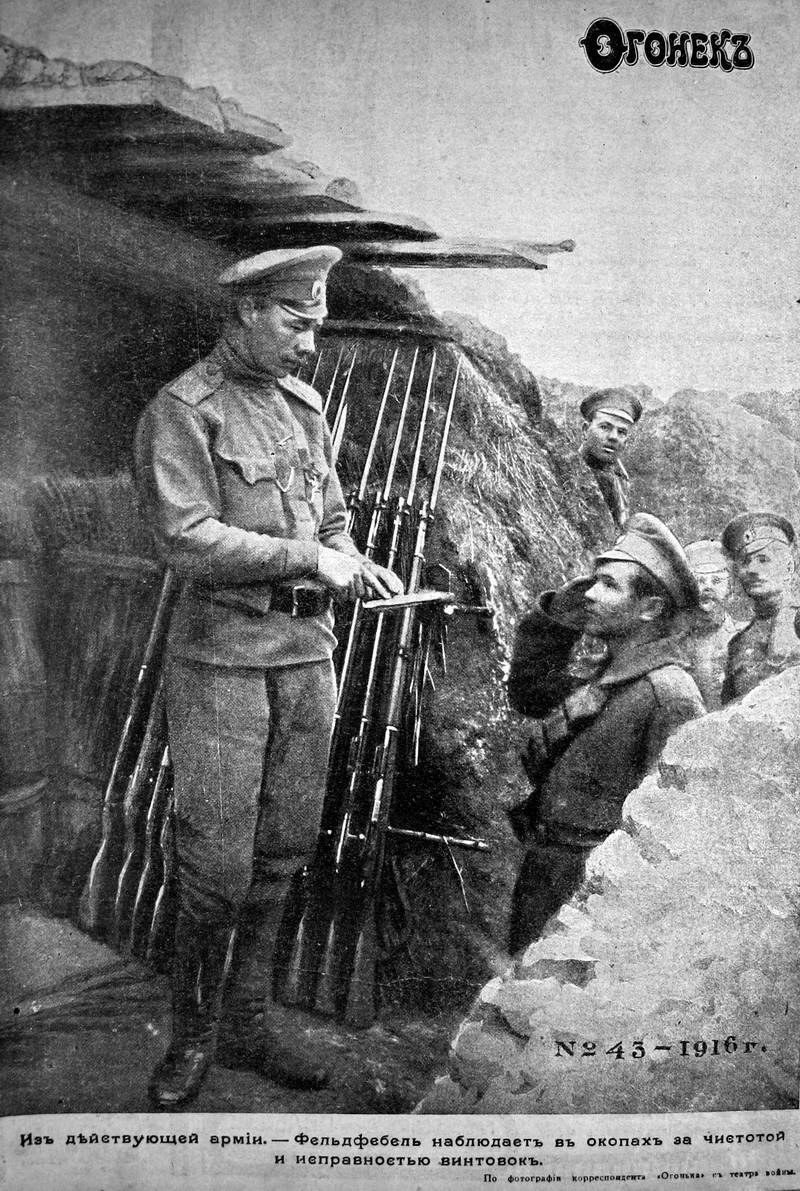
Young non-commissioned officer showing his men how to use the new rifles, Ogoniok, 1916.

At the start of the war, the nobility accounted for the vast majority of officers: 90% of generals, 80% of middle-ranking officers, and 65% of junior officers. The cadre suffered considerable losses: 60,000 officers were killed and wounded in the first 12 months of the war and 72,000 died or disappeared between 1914 and 1917, including 208 generals and 1,076 medical officers. In 1914, military schools trained 30,222 officers in a year and a half; in 1916, 38 schools sent 50,350 officers to the front; in all, the army received 227,000 new officers during the war, of whom only 5% were nobles, 27.5% middle-class and 58.4% peasants. The new officers and non-commissioned officers, most of whom were of working-class origin, found it increasingly difficult to cope with the arrogance and incompetence of their superiors: when revolutionary unrest began to make itself felt in the army, many of them showed solidarity with their men.

Mortality due to combat, infection from wounds, and epidemics exceeded all forecasts, and the medical service was rapidly overwhelmed: in one field hospital, General Brusilov found 4 doctors, working day and night, for 3,000 wounded and sick. The army lost 1.8 million men in 1914 alone. Evacuating the wounded on an overloaded rail network posed insurmountable problems: during the Lake Naroch offensive of March-April 1916, it took 5 days to bring a trainload of wounded to Moscow, and 12 during the Brusilov offensive of June 1916. The Moscow evacuation district, comprising 6 central Russian governments (Moscow, Yaroslavl, Kazan, Samara, Tambov, and Kostroma), with 196,000 hospital beds, received an average of 90,000 wounded and sick per month, and a total of 2,427,288 from August 1914 to June 1917. Despite the efforts of expert surgeons like Nikolai Bogoraz (ru) and Nikolay Burdenko, the recovery rate was low: of the 1.5 million soldiers hospitalized between September 1914 and September 1915, 468,000 were sent back to the front, and of those who didn't die of infection or epidemics, many remained disabled.

The turnover of troops was as rapid as that of cadres: practically every unit changed its composition ten or twelve times during the war, preventing the formation of corps solidarity. General Anton Denikin spoke of "a constant stream of men". The mobilized peasants complained that their leaders lived a luxurious life away from the troops, and treated their soldiers like serfs. One of them writes that, in his unit, officers "whipped five men in front of 28,000 soldiers because they had left their barracks without permission to go and buy bread".

The trials of war, 1914–1915

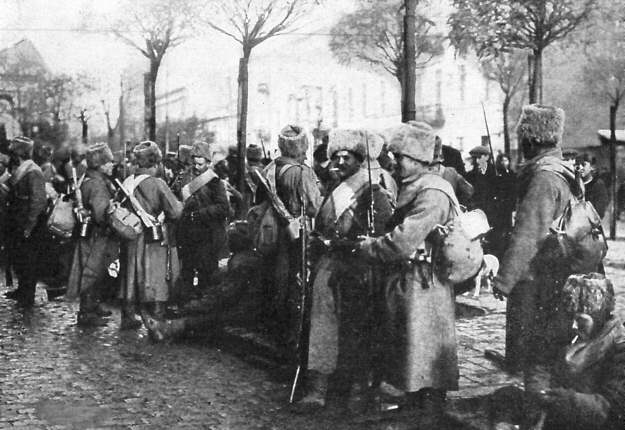
Siberian soldiers in Warsaw, 1914.

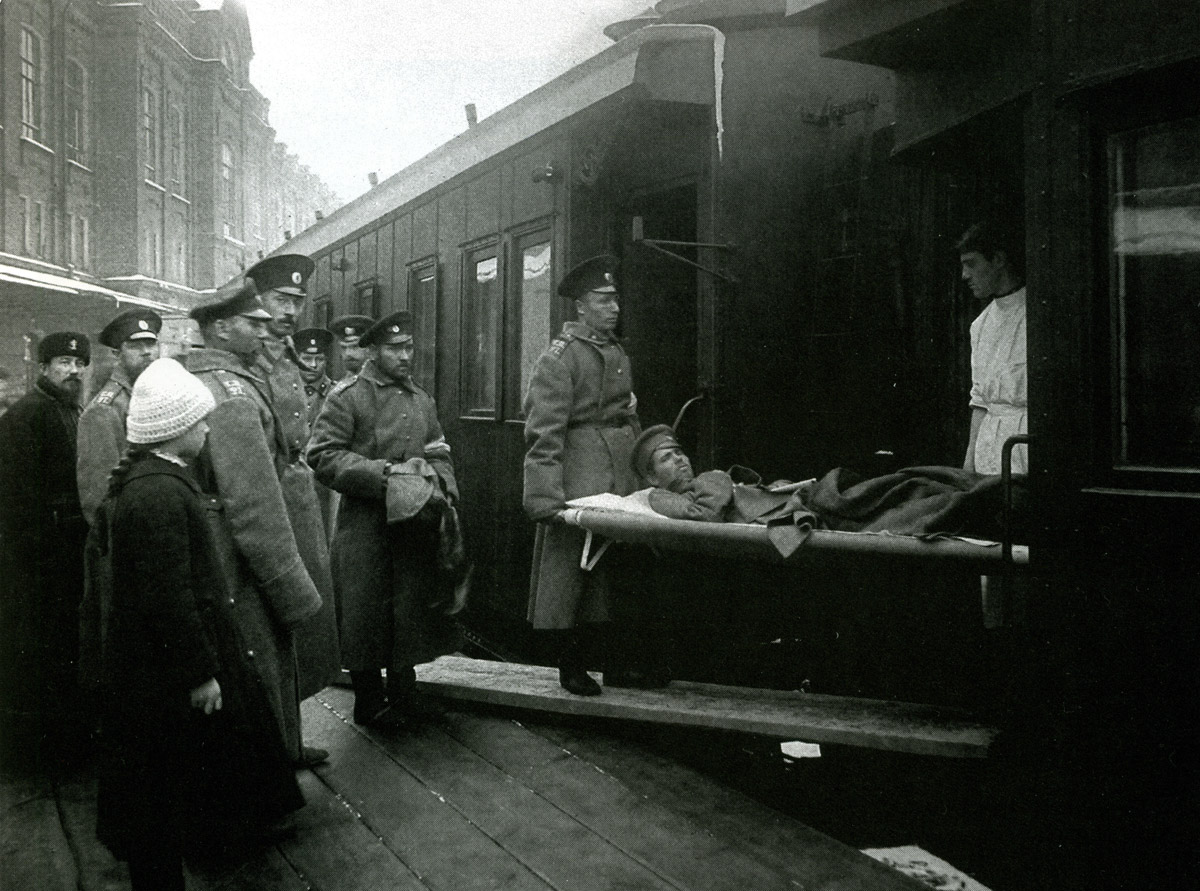
Evacuation of a wounded man by rail, Moscow, 1914.

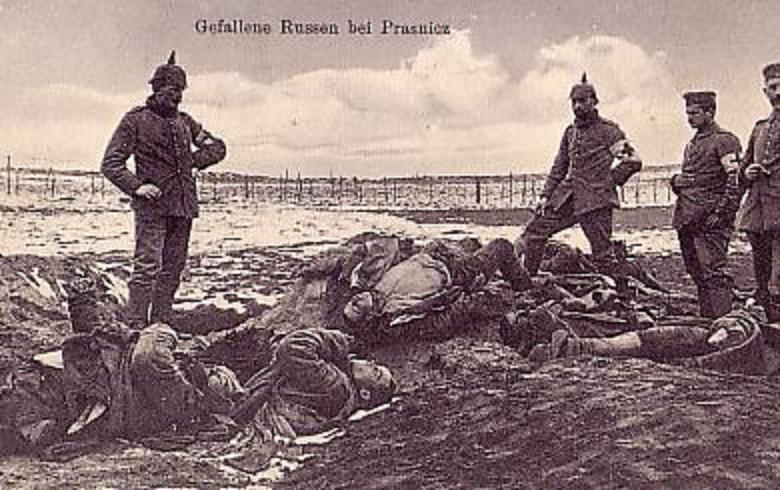
Russian soldiers killed during the Narew Offensive, German postcard, 1915.

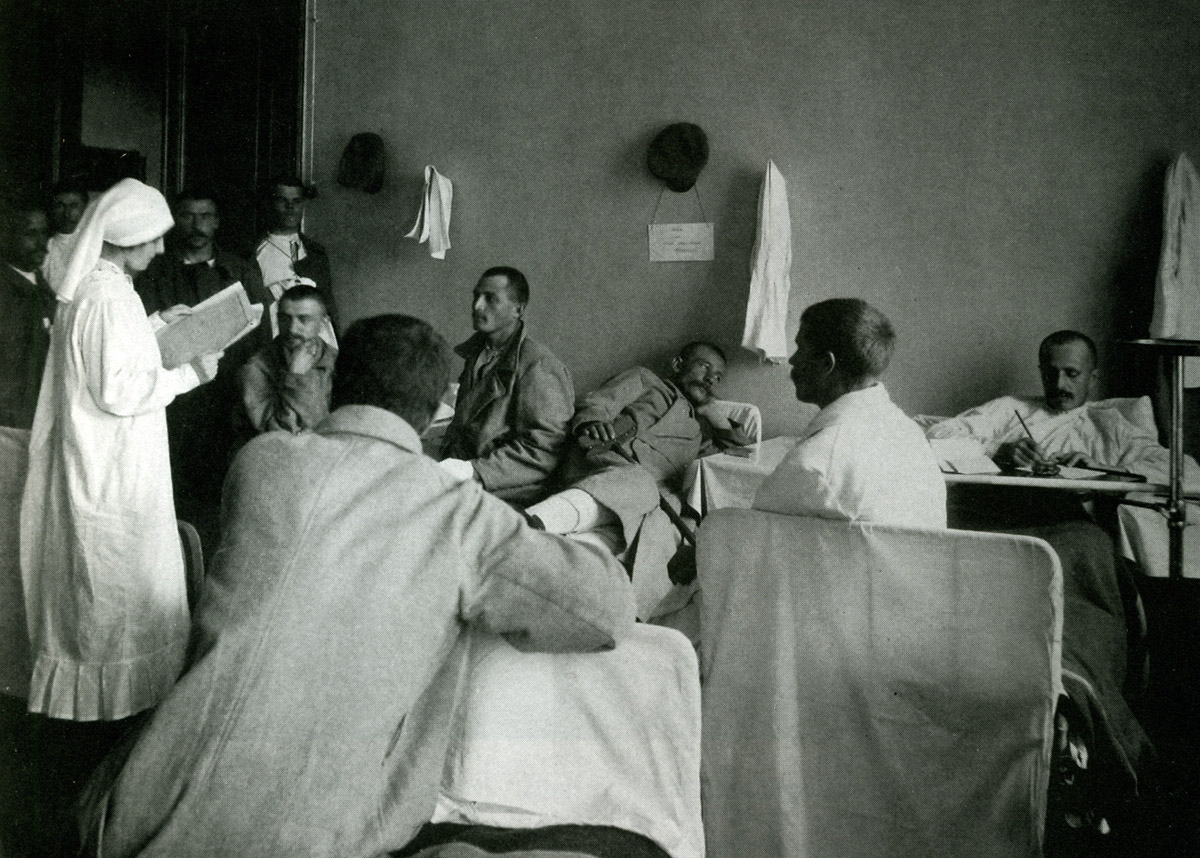
Military hospital set up in a Karl K. Mazing school in Moscow, 1914.

=== A discredited power ===
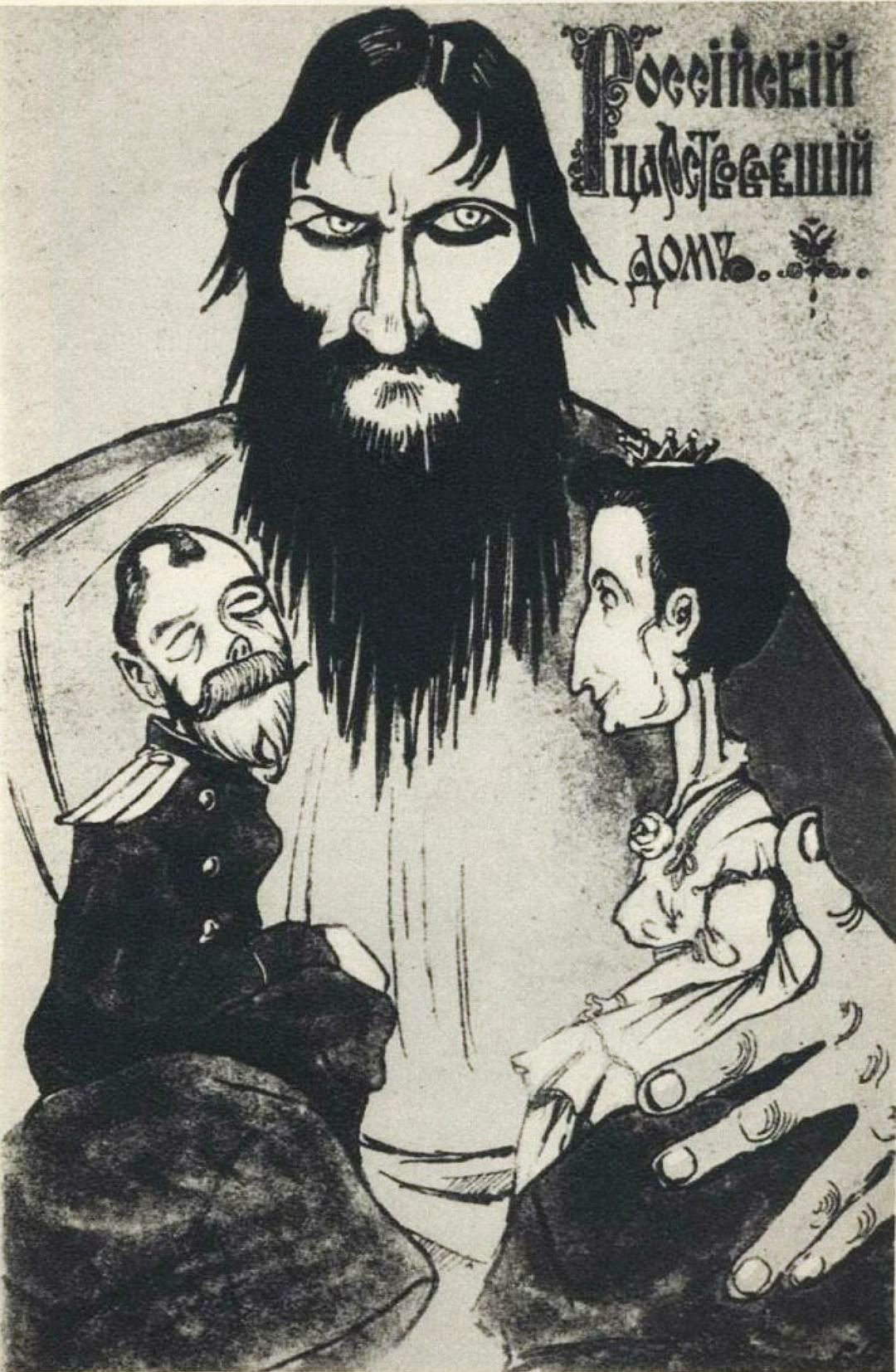
Rasputin manipulating the Tsar and Empress Alexandra, Russian caricature.

On July 19, 1915, Nicholas II agreed to reopen the Duma. This decision was welcomed by the liberal bourgeoisie, especially the Moscow industrialists, grouped in the Committee of War Industries, who hoped for reforms, a more efficient government, and a better distribution of arms orders. Deputies from the center and left joined forces to form a "Progressive Bloc" comprising two-thirds of the deputies, but the Tsar was quick to see this as a threat to autocracy.

On August 22, 1915, with the situation at the front turning into a disaster, Nicholas II decided to dismiss Grand Duke Nicholas Nikolayevich, who had been transferred to the Caucasus front, and take command of the armed forces himself. This decision caused such consternation among the ministers that several declared their disapproval of the imperial decision. The Tsar fixed his stay at the Stavka headquarters, transferred to Mogilev in Belarus, and now only remotely controlled political decisions. Empress Alexandra, made very unpopular by her German origins and by the compromising favor she granted to the healer Grigori Rasputin, claimed to exercise power in an autocratic sense: on September 2, 1915, she obtained the suspension of the Duma, recently re-established, which led to two days of general strike in Petrograd. Ministers who disapproved of her conduct of business or that of her favorite were dismissed. Between September 1915 and February 1917, Russia had 4 prime ministers, 5 ministers of the interior, 3 of foreign affairs, 3 of transport, and 4 of agriculture. In March 1916, the Tsar dismissed General Alexei Polivanov, Minister of War, an excellent organizer who had succeeded in reviving the army after the disasters of 1915, but whom the Empress reproached for his links with the liberal opposition.

Towards the end of 1916, the parliamentary opposition formed several plots to depose the Tsar and entrust the regency to either his uncle Nicholas Nikolayevich or his younger brother Michael Alexandrovich, but neither of the two Grand Dukes had any desire to exercise power. The only successful plot was the assassination of Rasputin by a group of aristocrats on December 16, 1916, but this only served to further isolate the Tsar.

=== Latest victories ===
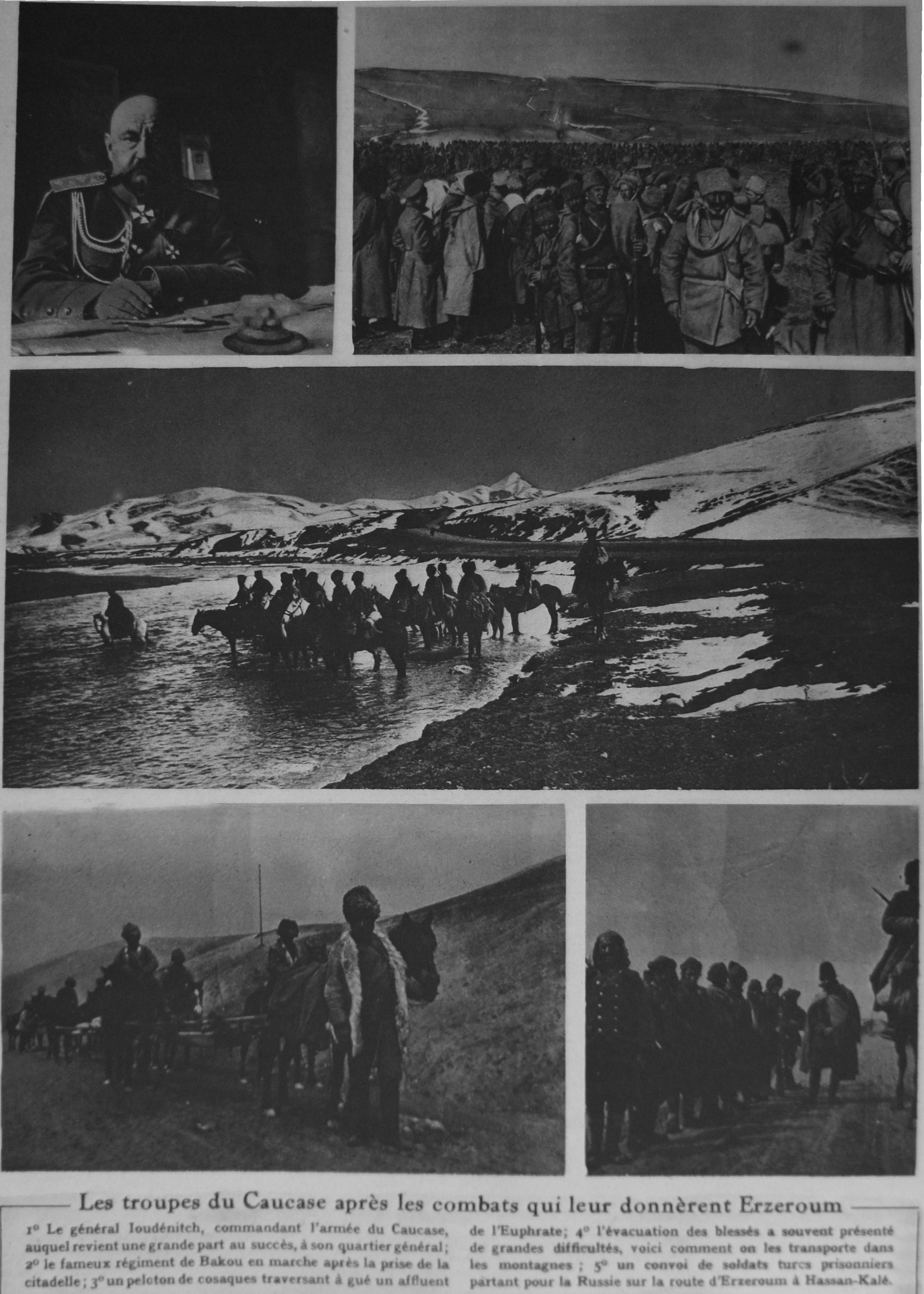
"Les troupes du Caucase après les combats qui leur donnèrent Erzeroum", Le Miroir, May 14, 1916.

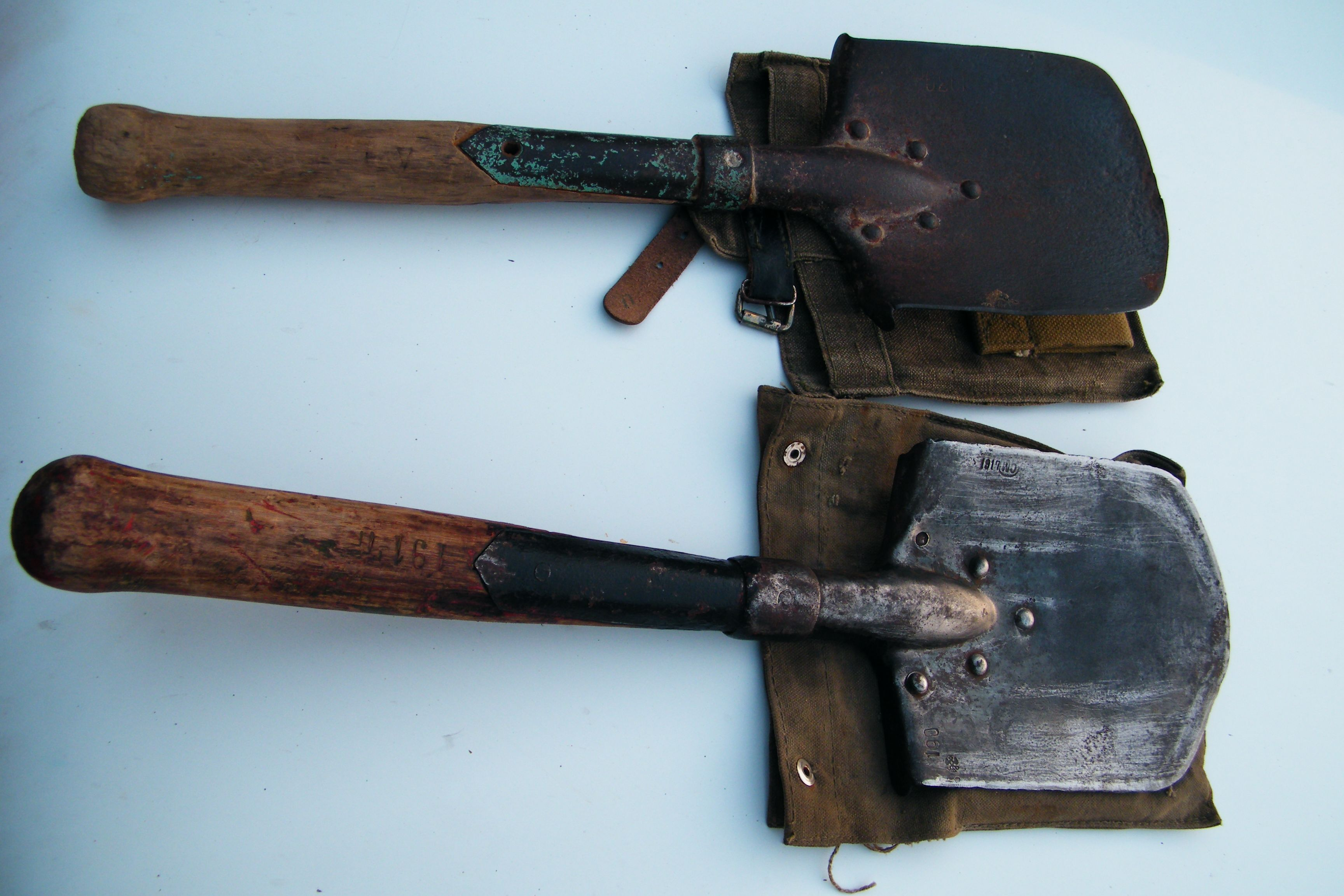
Russian trench shovels, 1916

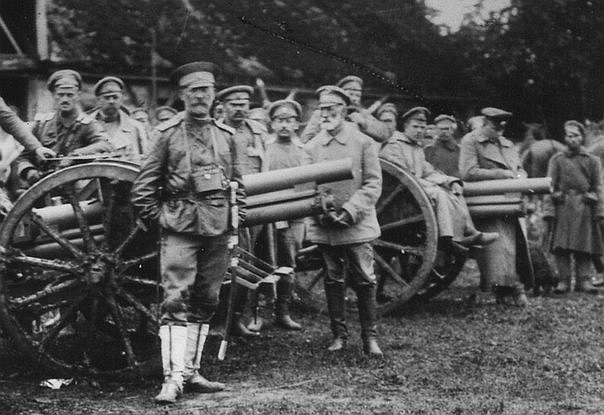
Guns captured by Russian troops during the Brusilov offensive, 1916

Map of the Russian front in 1917.

At the beginning of 1916, when the British operation in the Dardanelles had turned into a fiasco, the Russians, supported by Armenian volunteers, decided to launch a major offensive on the Caucasus front: undertaken in the middle of winter in deep snow, it resulted in the capture of Erzurum, Trebizond and Erzincan. The difficulty of transport in mountainous terrain, the arrival of Ottoman reinforcements, and the exhaustion of the Russian army, which had its hands full with the offensive in Galicia, led to a stabilization of the front. Both empires were at the limit of their strength when the Russian Revolution of February–March 1917 led to the dislocation of the Russian army, allowing the Ottomans to retake the lost provinces.

The Galicia Offensive of 1916 was one of the biggest operations of the war. The Southwest Front, commanded by General Alexei Brusilov, fielded 4 armies (the 8th, 11th, 7th, and 9th) totaling 600,000 men. He benefited from the efforts made since 1915 to renew his armament, with better machine-gun, artillery, and ammunition supplies, train several classes of new officers, and adapt his tactics based on the experience acquired by the Allies on the Western Front: support points and approach trenches enabled assault troops to advance as close as possible to enemy lines. Russian aircraft scouted Austro-Hungarian positions, which were pounded by artillery from the start of the offensive on June 4. The Russians attacked on an 80 km front and advanced to 45 km. Another operation, the Baranovichi offensive in Belarus, was to be carried out against the Germans in the northern sector of the front: due to weather and other factors, it did not get underway until July and ended in complete failure. The main offensive on the southwestern front ran out of steam in the marshes around the fortress of Kovel. However, it had considerable strategic consequences: the Germans had to reduce their pressure in the Battle of Verdun; the Austro-Hungarians, who had lost 567,000 dead and wounded and 408,000 prisoners, canceled their planned offensive on the Italian Front; and Romania's entry into the First World War on the side of the Entente on August 27 opened up a new front on the flank of the Central Empires.

The Romanian commitment, however, came too late and was poorly coordinated with the Russian offensive: it was Russia, on the contrary, that had to deploy its front to the south to prevent Romania from being crushed after the fall of Bucharest. In January 1917, three Russian armies (the 9th, 4th, and 6th) held the Moldavian front between the Carpathians and the Danube Delta, while the hard-pressed Romanian divisions were reconstituted in the rear.

The partial successes of 1916 were not enough to remedy the fall in morale, as revealed by mail censorship: at the end of 1916, 93% of soldiers were indifferent or pessimistic about the outcome of the conflict.

== The effort from behind ==
=== Finances lagging behind ===
Russia's mobilization rate was low: 10%, compared with 20% in France and Germany. However, the economy was lagging. Aid to the families of mobilized soldiers rose from 191 million rubles in 1914 to 624 million in 1915, plus pensions for widows, orphans, and disabled. The State Bank of the Russian Empire had to print 1.5 billion rubles in the first months of the conflict, and by December 1915, the ruble had already lost 20% of its value. Russia had to borrow from its allies: in October 1915, it received 500 million rubles from the French and 3 billion from the British. In exchange, part of the Russian gold stock, worth 464 million roubles, was sent to the United Kingdom as collateral.

Financing the war effort led to an increase in public debt. In all, the Russian state spent 38.65 billion rubles during the war, 62% of which was covered by domestic debt and printing money, 24% by taxation, and the rest by foreign debt.

Russian finance in 1914–1917

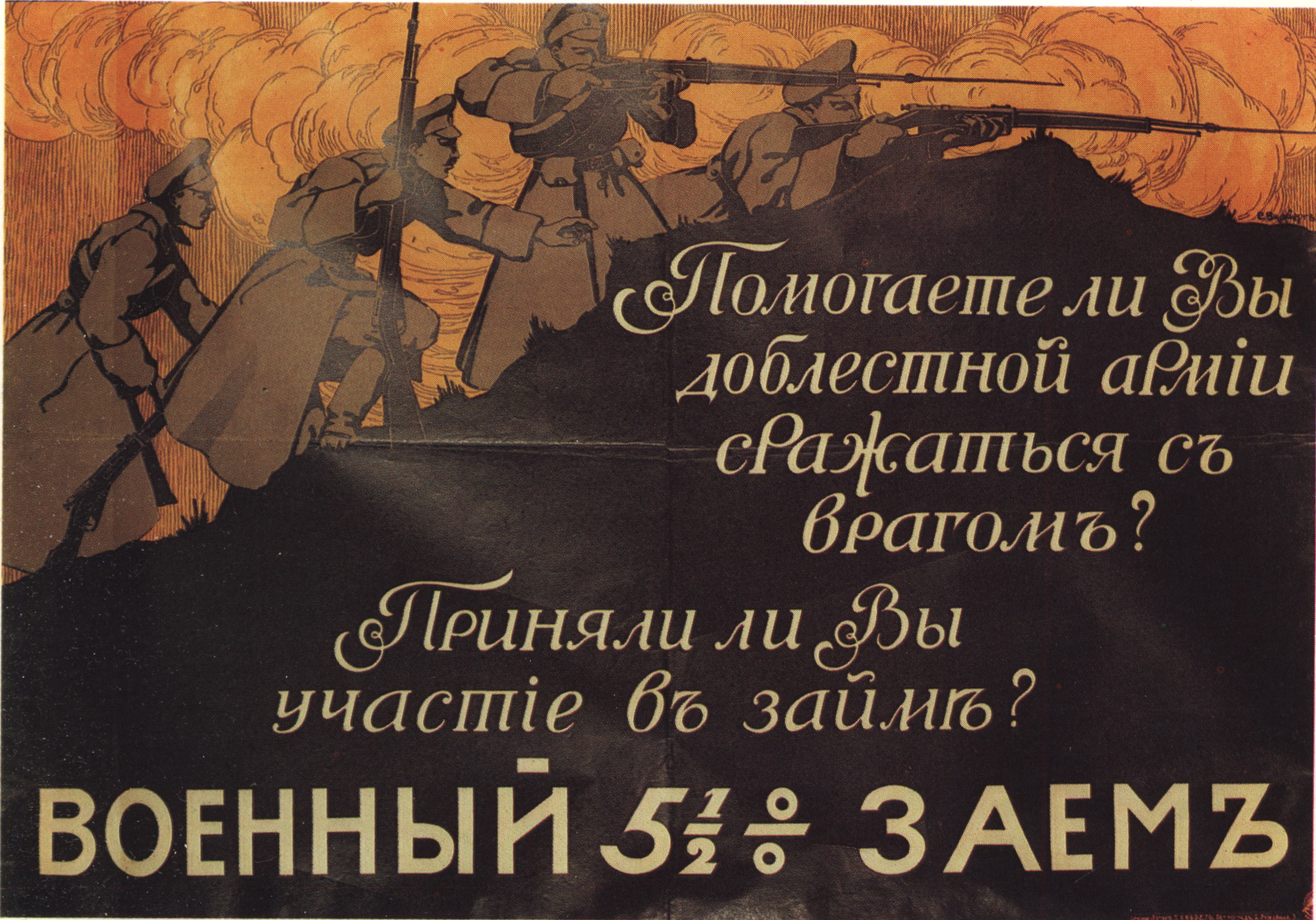
Poster for the 5.5% national defense loan, 1916.

Development of money supply and inflation in Russia between 1914 and 1917.

=== The transport bottleneck ===
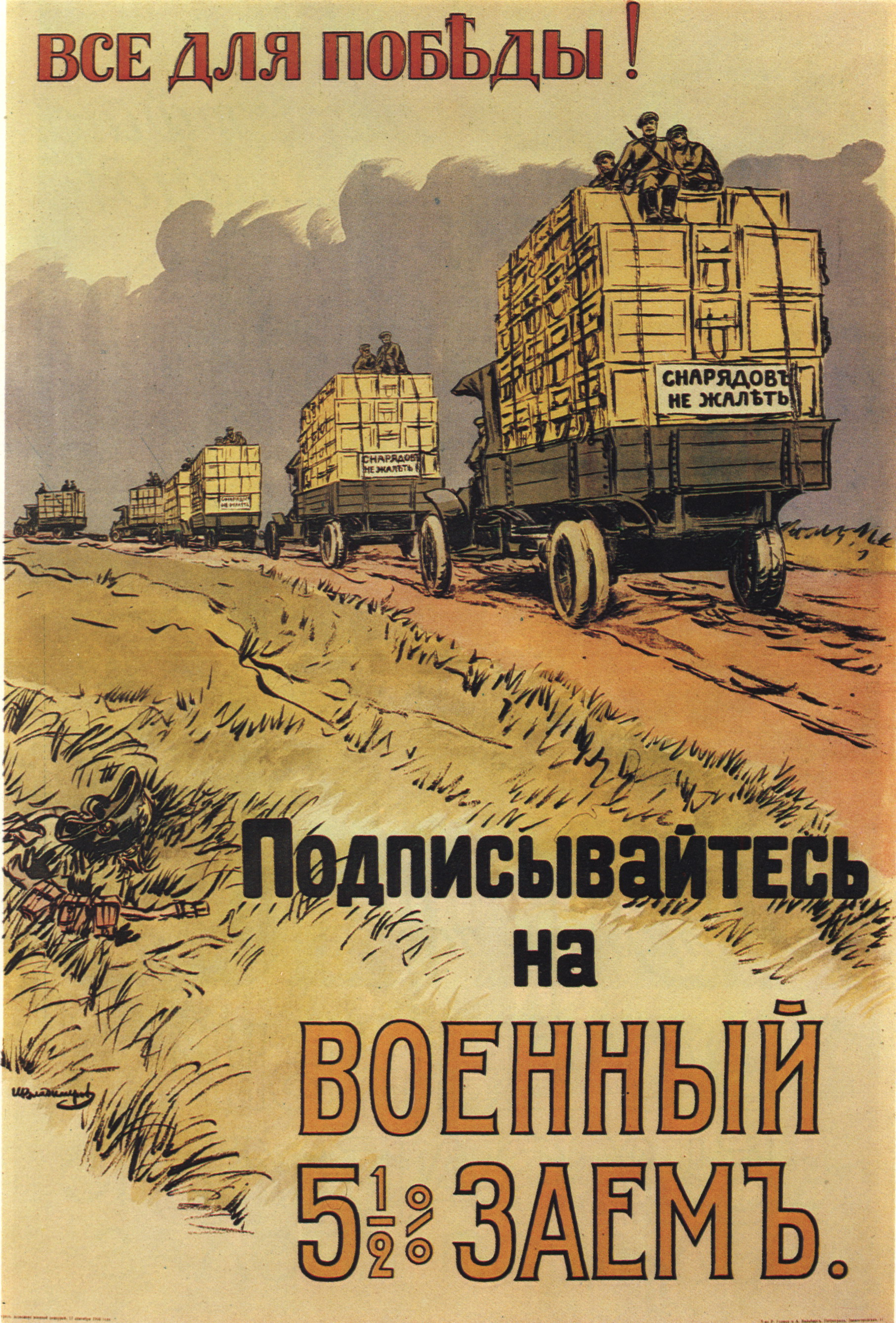
Allied trucks and equipment deliveries, poster for 5.5% loan, 1916.

Transport was one of the weak points of the immense Russian Empire. With the Black Sea closed by the Ottomans, imports were channeled to the port of Arkhangelsk on the White Sea, which had the disadvantage of being frozen in winter, and then to the ice-free port of Murmansk. They ensured limited traffic under the threat of German submarines. But the construction of the White Sea Railway was still unfinished at the start of the war: the new line, hastily built by unskilled workers, was single-track, partly made of wooden rails, and weakened by the instability of the frozen ground; it required constant repairs, and trains ran at 10 or 20 km/h. 70,000 prisoners of war, along with 10,000 Russian workers, were employed on the site, whose living conditions anticipated those of the Gulag. The Arkhangelsk railroad, which in 1914 was running barely a dozen small trains a day, managed to handle 2.7 million tons of material in 1916. By 1917, the theoretical capacity of the three main supply routes – Arkhangelsk, Murmansk, and the Trans-Siberian Railway – had risen to 3.5 million tons a year.

To facilitate access to Arctic ports, in October 1914 Russia acquired two icebreakers: the Canadian Earl Grey (en) and the American S.S. J.L. Horne.

Coal production increased during the war with the opening of new deposits in the Urals and Siberia, but the coalfields of the Donbass and the East were far from the main industrial centers; the railroads alone consumed 30% of coal in 1914 and 50% in 1917. In the absence of trains, coal piled up on the docks: 1.5 million tons were waiting in October 1915, and 3.5 million in March 1916.

The basic unit of rail transport was the tieplushka (heating wagon), a simple freight wagon with a central stove that could hold 28 soldiers and up to 45 prisoners. The priority given to military convoys bound for the front caused considerable delays in civilian transport to supply the major cities of northern Russia: food often rotted en route, due to a lack of locomotives.

Russian transport in 1914–1917

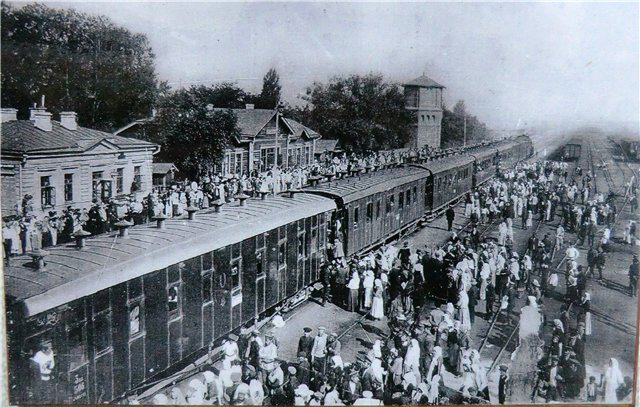
Train bringing soldiers back from the front to Druzhkivka (Donetsk) in 1917.

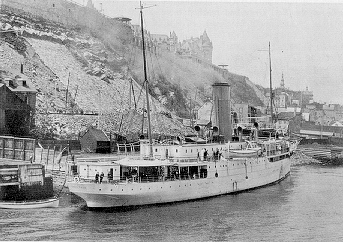
The Canadian icebreaker Earl Grey becomes the Russian Fiodor Lutke (en) in 1914.

=== Second wave for Russian industry ===
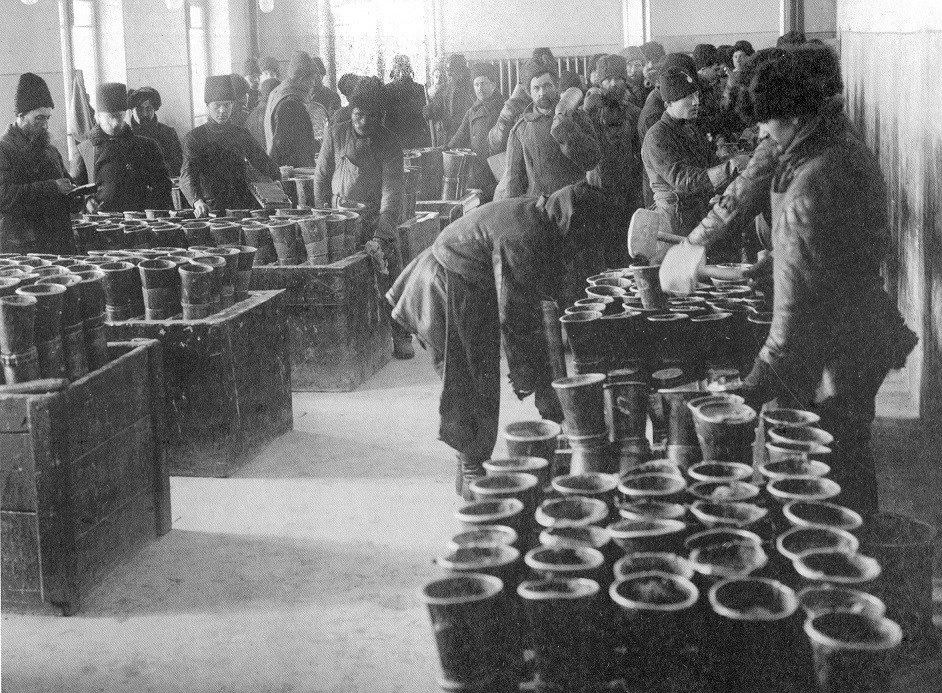
Samara shell factory, 1915.

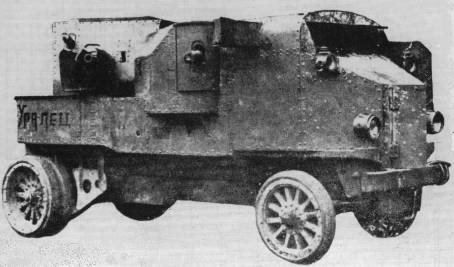
Garford-Poutilov (en) self-propelled gun, a product of Russian-American industrial cooperation, 1916.

Despite a long initial delay, Russia managed to launch a war industry. It was only in April 1915 that Vankov, director of the Bryansk arsenal, obtained authorization to federate a dozen companies for the production of shells. The ammunition crisis was largely responsible for the defeats of 1915, compounded by poor organization, especially in the early days: one arsenal produced 900,000 faulty artillery fuses before anyone noticed the defect. General Alekseï Manikovski, who would later become Minister of the Provisional Government and then Director of Artillery for the Red Army, wrote: "In this field, all the negative qualities of Russian industry were fully apparent: bureaucratism, mental inertia on the part of the managers, ignorance to the point of illiteracy on the part of the workforce".

The production of rifles quadrupled between 1914 and 1916, while that of 3-inch shells rose from 150,000 per month in August 1914 to 1.9 million in 1916. Throughout the war, Russia produced 3.5 million rifles, 24,500 machine guns, 4 billion bullets, and 5.8 million 4.8-inch shells. The state arsenals, with their 310,000 workers, accounted for the bulk of production, followed by big Petrograd industrialists like Poutilov, but industrialists in Moscow and the provinces claimed their share of production and profits: in all, the State Defense Council supervised 4,900 enterprises. To increase their activity, Putilov, Kolomna Ingénierie, the Sormovo Machine Plant, the Bryansk Arsenal, and the Tula Arms Plant called on British technicians from Vickers and French technicians from Schneider-Le Creusot. The influx of foreign technicians and equipment, particularly from the United States, enabled production to expand in areas such as locomotives, the automotive industry, and radio. Russia also had to import certain raw materials, such as copper.

Victories over the Austro-Hungarian army provided enough weapons and ammunition to equip two army corps: the Russians even set up ammunition factories to supply Austro-Hungarian-calibre weapons; in 1916, they produced 37 million rounds of ammunition. The blockage of imports forced the search for substitutes for chemicals, until then mainly imported from Germany, and the development of domestic deposits. The shortage of coal led to research into oil refining and hydroelectricity, which were to be fully developed with Soviet industrial plans.

Public rumors criticized corruption, the black market, and war profiteers; in 1917, it was estimated that 3,000 to 5,000 entrepreneurs and large landowners possessed a combined fortune of 500 billion rubles. However, this widespread discontent found little political expression until the revolution of February–March 1917.

=== Rescue services ===
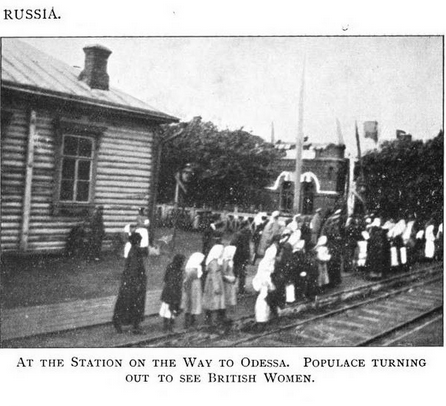
Russian women awaiting the arrival of British volunteer nurses from the Scottish Women's Hospitals near Odessa, c. 1914–1918.

Imperial Russia had long had structures in place to help war victims. The Alexander Committee for the War Wounded was founded in 1814, just after the Napoleonic Wars, and the Skobelev Committee for the War Invalids in 1904, during the war against Japan. The prolongation of the conflict created new needs that the State had great difficulty in satisfying. Pensions for soldiers' families, widows, orphans, and invalids represented a growing cost, and although increased several times, were unable to keep pace with inflation. The number of beneficiaries rose from 7.8 million in September 1914, to 10.3 million in 1915 and 35 million in 1917.

Civil society organized to support the army and the needy. The Union of Zemstvos, created on August 12, 1914, and chaired by Prince Georgi Lvov, federated provincial assemblies and rural landowners, organized food and equipment collections and set up care centers for the wounded. In cooperation with the Union of Cities, chaired by Moscow Mayor M.V. Tchesnokov and Nikolai Kishkin, it developed a network of technicians, surveyors, and statisticians and, during the debacle of summer 1915, made a major contribution to the rehousing of displaced populations. In June 1915, the Union of Zemstvos and the Union of Towns joined forces to form the Zemgor. The two unions began collecting and manufacturing war materiel, either in small local companies or in specially created workshops: the first zemstvos shell was produced in July 1915. In November 1915, the Moscow municipality alone supplied the army with 800,000 coats, 220,000 pairs of valenki (felt boots), and 2.1 million gas masks. By 1916, the Union of Zemstvos had 8,000 affiliated companies with several hundred thousand employees. In 1916, Interior Minister Nikolai Maklakov ordered Lvov to disband his 80,000-strong brigade of civilian volunteers who went to the front to dig trenches and graves.

The Russian Red Cross (ROKK), thanks to its international influence and support among the ruling class, gained greater respect from the authorities and contributed to medical aid and the prevention of epidemics; on August 28, 1914, it set up a Central Bureau for Information on Prisoners of War, enabling families to re-establish contact with their missing loved ones. It employed 105,000 people throughout France. From 1915 onwards, the Empress, the princesses of the imperial family, court ladies, and actresses were all happy to be photographed in their nursing uniforms with the wounded; only Grand Duchess Olga, the Tsar's eldest daughter, seems to have been convincing in this role and enjoyed certain popularity.

More traditional forms of charity were sponsored by the Orthodox Church or merchants' associations, notably in Moscow.

Russian humanitarian images in 1914–1917

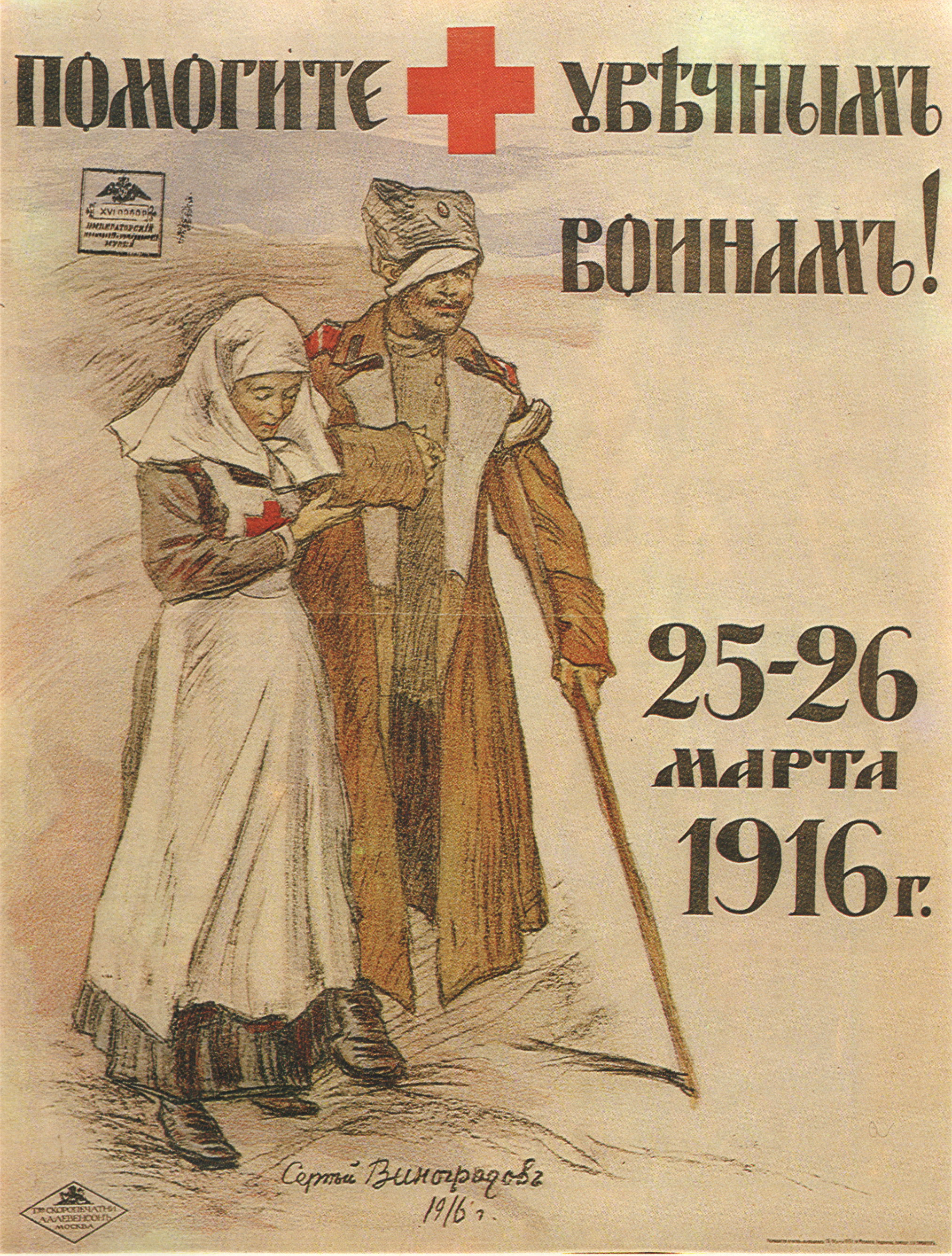
Nurse and wounded soldier, poster by Sergei Vinogradov, 1916.

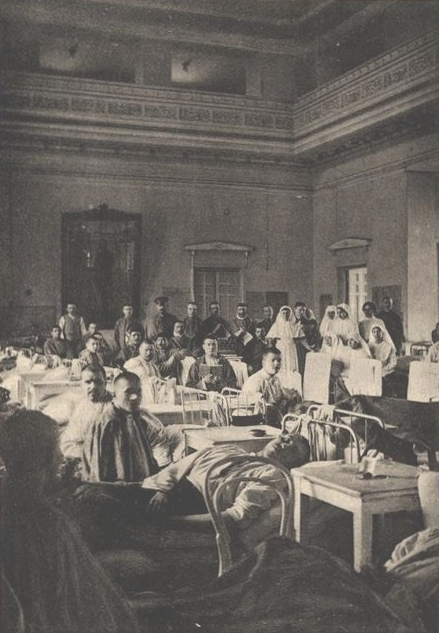
Military hospital in Petrograd, 1916.

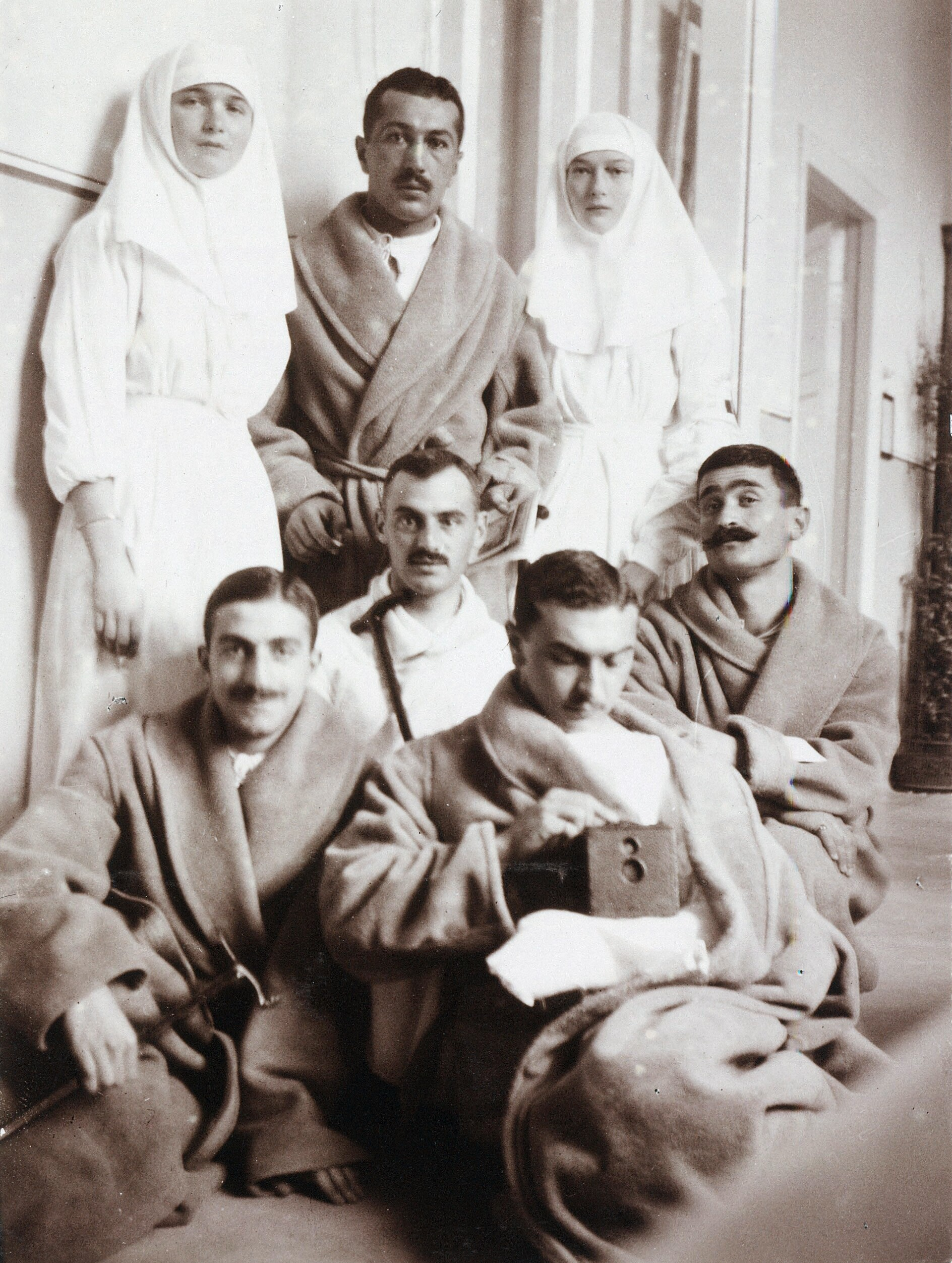
Grand Duchesses Olga and Tatiana as nurses at the Palace Hospital, Beinecke Library, c. 1915.

=== In search of the enemy within ===
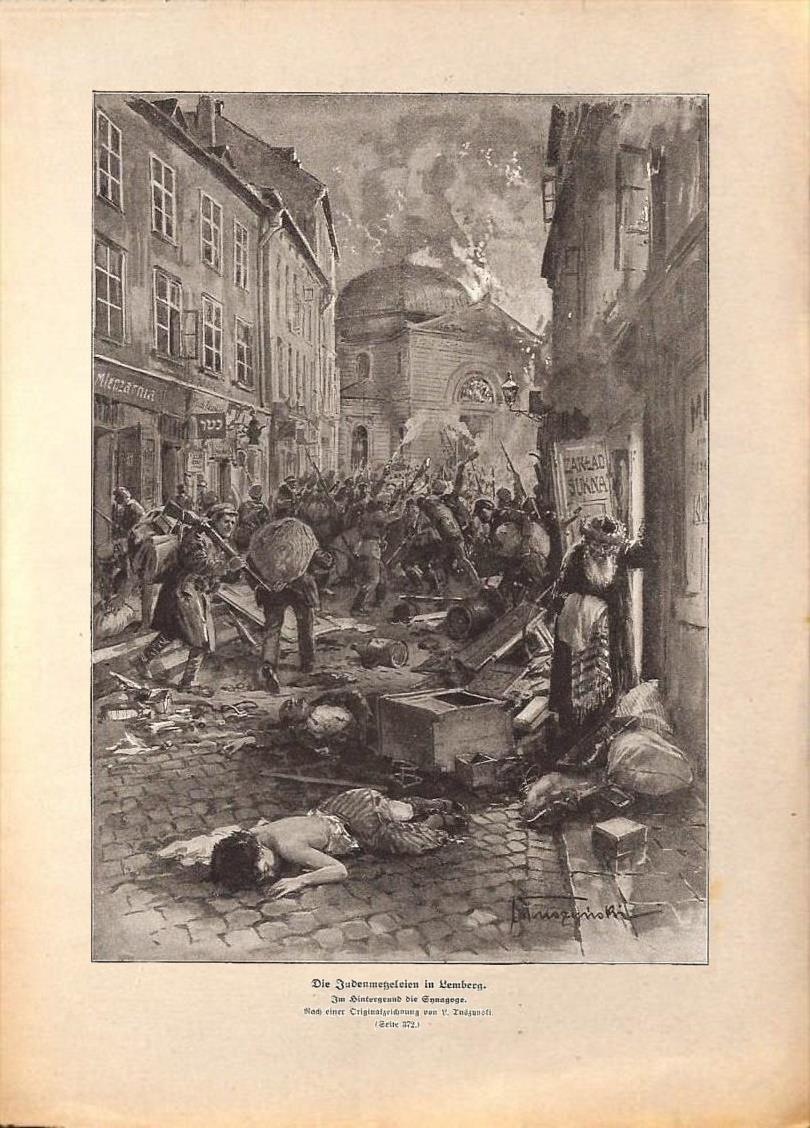
Ransacking of the Jewish quarter of Lemberg by the Russian army on September 29, 1914, drawing by Ladislaus Tuszyński, 1915.

Anti-Semitism, which seemed to be on the wane on the eve of the conflict, rose sharply. With almost 500,000 Jews serving in the army, they were accused of being pro-German and victims of brutality by the troops, especially the Cossacks. At the end of 1914, General Nikolai Ruzsky, commander of the Northern Front, had them expelled from the province of Płock, while Governor Bobrinsky drove them out of occupied Galicia. During the debacle of 1915, they were among the populations transferred en masse to the central regions of the Empire. Paradoxically, this deportation enabled the Jews to escape the confinement to the Residence Zone to which they had been confined since the partition of Poland. Similar violence affected the Gypsies.

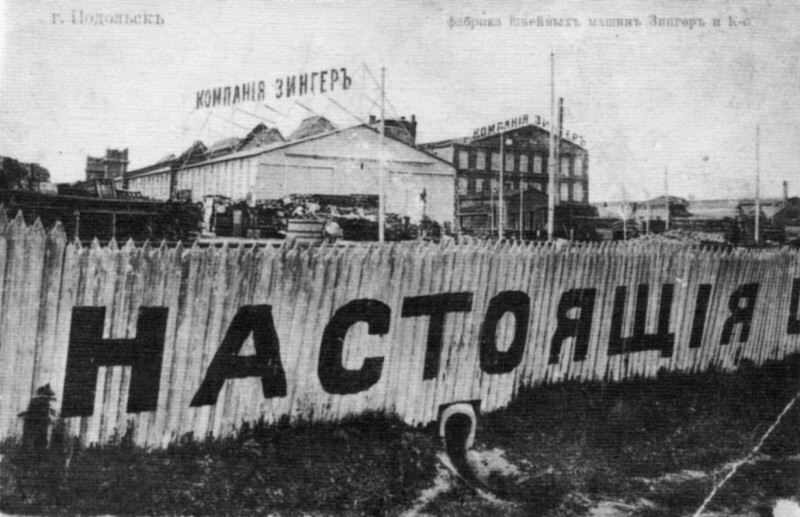
Singer sewing machine factory in Podolsk, c. 1911–1912

Anti-Germanism also found fertile ground. On September 6, 1914, the newspaper Novoye Vremya reported that large German-Baltic landowners were building landing fields for German aircraft and ports of debarkation for their fleets. An investigation quickly dispelled the rumors of brainwashing, but the Germans in Russia remained under suspicion. The government undertook the confiscation of German property, with the dual aim of satisfying the anti-German nationalist current and giving partial satisfaction to the peasants, in the absence of more general agrarian reform. A law of February 15 1915, expropriated not only Germans but also Austro-Hungarian, Ottoman, and later Bulgarian nationals. This measure applied to all foreigners naturalized after January 1, 1880, and their heirs; it did not, in principle, affect Volga Germans, who had been established since the 18th century, nor Baltic-Germans, often wealthy landowners, whose settlement dates back to the Middle Ages. 2,805 foreign owners and 41,480 of foreign origin were dispossessed, sometimes simply for having a German-sounding name. 34 wholly German-owned and 600 partly German-owned companies were expropriated. This measure disrupted production in several sectors, while hundreds of companies managed to obtain exemptions. In June 1915, an anti-German riot broke out in Moscow: crowds ransacked German companies and even piano manufacturers. The Singer sewing machine factory in Podolsk, which was American despite its Germanic name, had to lay off 125 German employees.

Abundant propaganda literature was distributed to soldiers and officers to explain the meaning of the war, under titles such as Notre alliée fidèle la France, La Courageuse Belgique, Sur la signification de la guerre en cours et le devoir de la mener jusqu'à son issue victorieuse, denouncing German atrocities and the ambitions of Pangermanism, which aimed to carve up Russia and enslave the Slav peoples. But as the defeats mounted, rumors spread of the existence of a "Black Bloc" comprising the Empress, Rasputin, and ministers of German origin such as Boris Stürmer, head of government in 1916, acting to sell Russia and conclude a separate peace with Germany.

=== The ups and downs of the peasantry ===
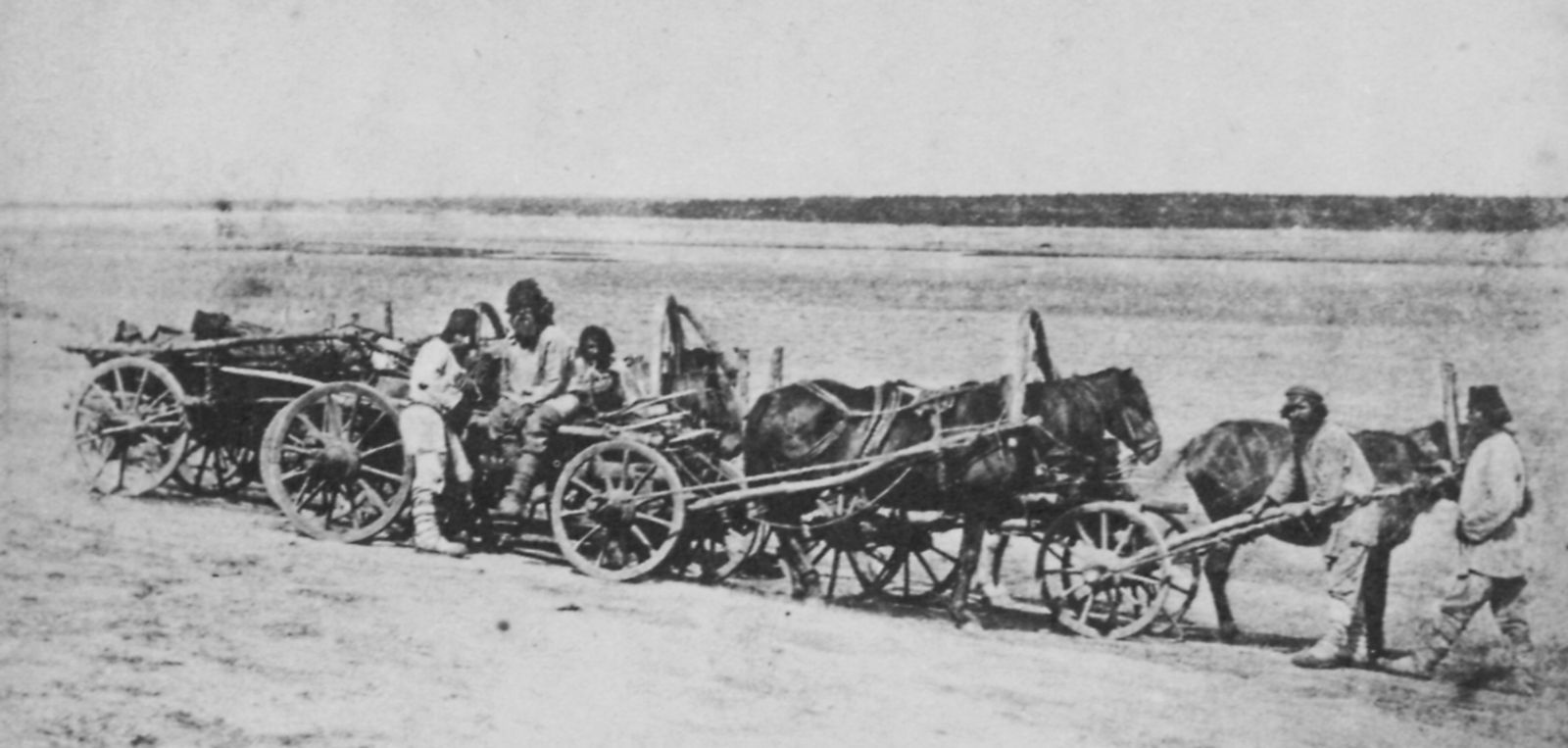
Peasants with their carriage going to market near Kamenka in the Penza government, c. 1870.

In a predominantly rural and agricultural society, the effects of the war were widely felt in the countryside. In 1913, a record year, the Russian Empire exported 13 million tons of grain. In 1914, the harvest was jeopardized by the mobilization of 800,000 farmers but remained on average. It rose again in 1915, fell in 1916 (to 79.6% of the 1909–1913 average), and rose again in 1917 (to 94.7% of the average). These figures conceal major regional disparities: Ukraine, southern Russia and Siberia, with their surplus, had to feed the less fertile northern Russia and the army, massively deployed in the western regions. In addition to mobilizing men, the army requisitioned horses (2.1 million between 1914 and 1917), while factories, mobilized to meet the army's needs, stopped producing agricultural machinery.

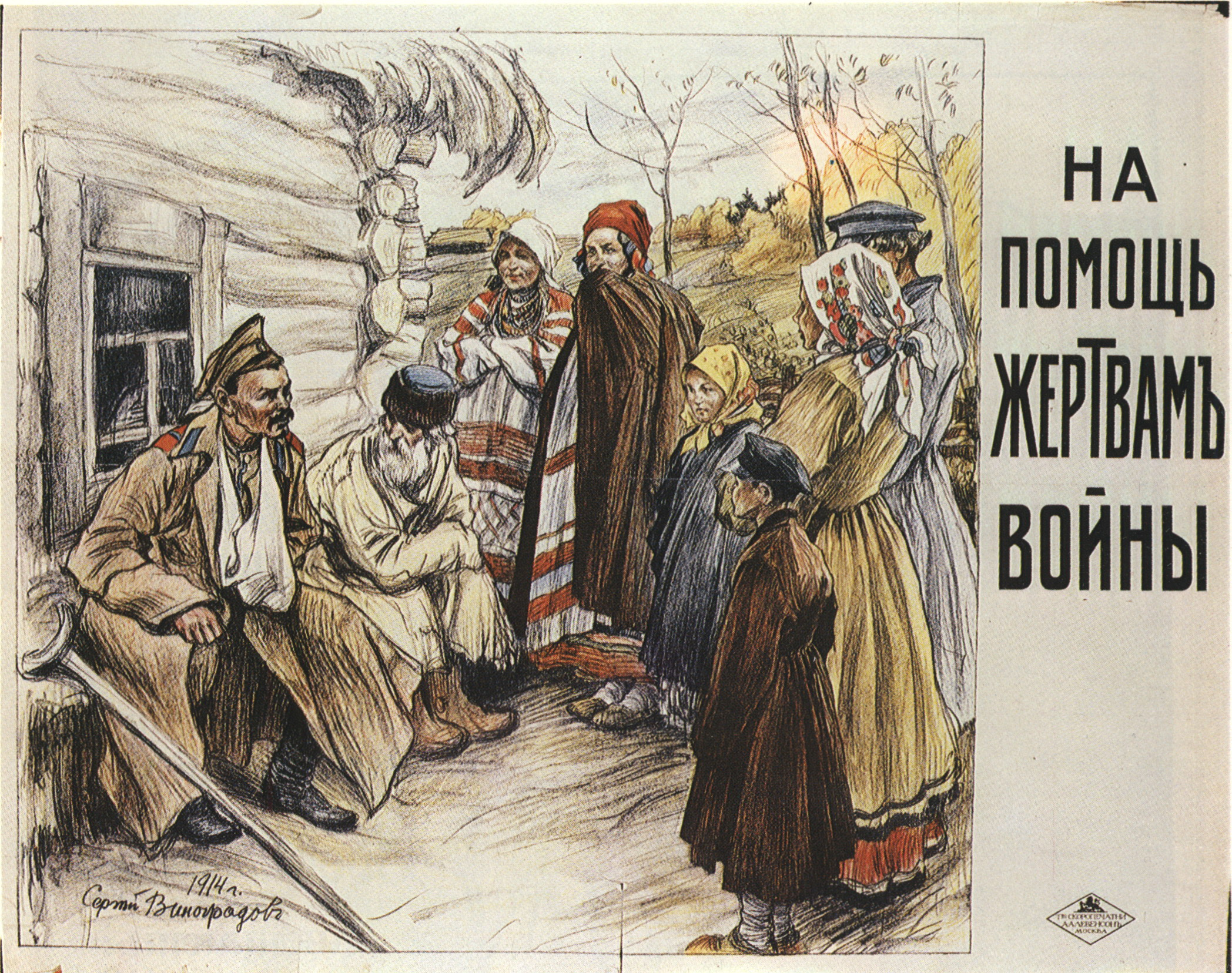
A wounded soldier returning to the village, poster by Sergei Vinogradov, 1914.

Food shortages were not due to poor harvests, but to disrupted trade: the Great Retreat of 1915 led to the loss of fertile provinces and displaced several million inhabitants (5.5 million according to Nicolas Werth) to the central and northern provinces, while army purchases led to rapid inflation. The government set up an army procurement system in 1915, and a central flour office in June 1916, but did not consider introducing rationing until September 1917.

The end of exports and the shortage of manufactured goods, industry having reconverted to military equipment, left farmers with large grain surpluses that they could neither sell nor trade. They returned to a self-sufficient economy, reducing the share of cash crops (wheat, barley, sugar beet) in favor of food crops (rye, oats, potatoes) for their consumption and that of their livestock, and developing local craftsmanship in wool, leather, and cotton. While the large estates declined due to a lack of machinery and hired labor, many medium-sized farmers grew rich from the sale of meat and vodka: their situation was often better than before the war.

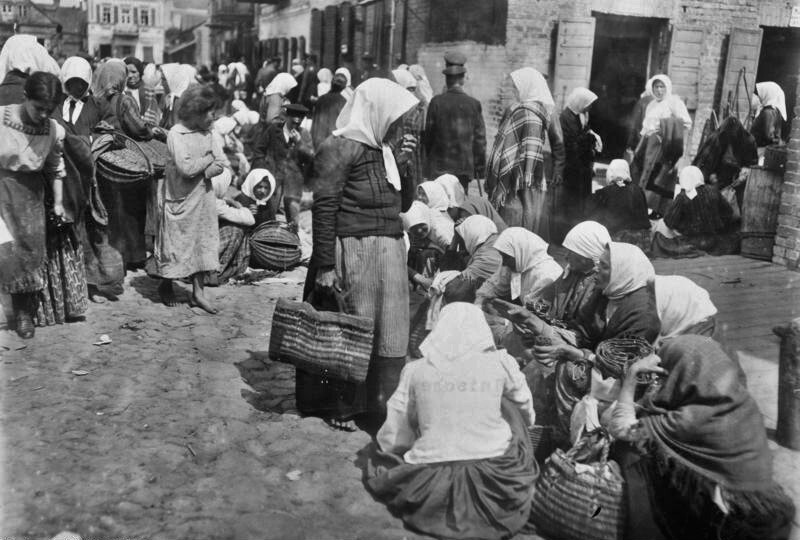
Women at a market in Lida (Grodno government) in 1916.

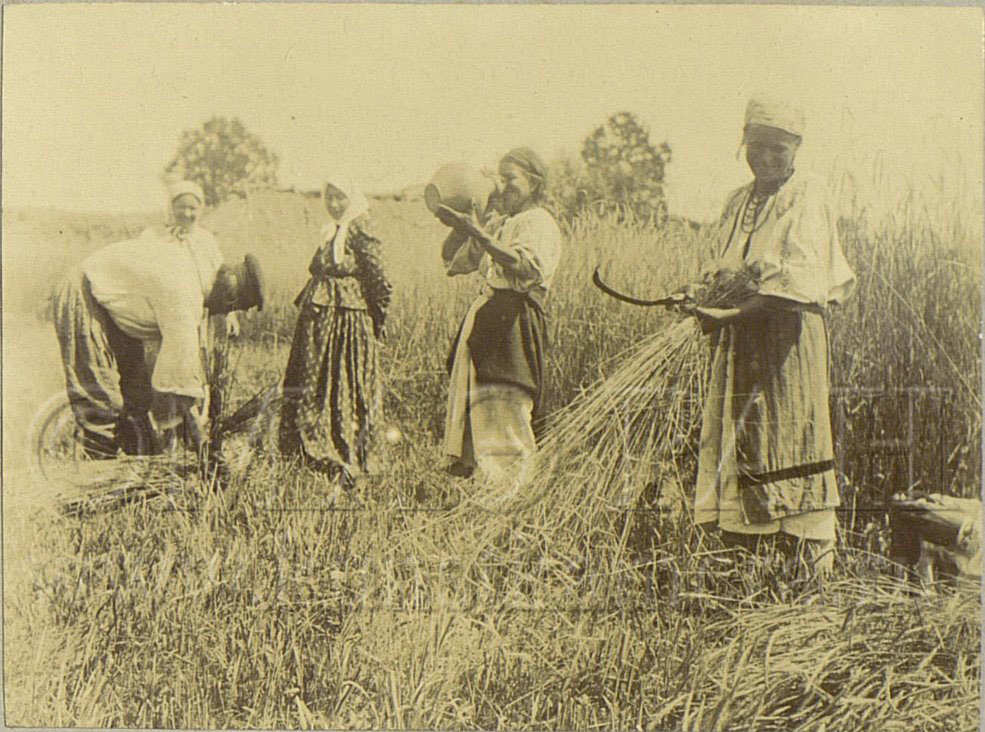
Harvesting in the Poltava government, a grain-surplus region, 1894.

To remedy the labor shortage, prisoners of war, mostly Austro-Hungarian, were put to work: in 1916, 460,000 of them were employed in agriculture and 140,000 in road construction. Displaced persons from the western provinces also constituted an important labor pool: after initial reluctance, in October 1916, 354,000 were employed in the fields, where their know-how was appreciated.

The war also changed the role of women, who had to replace mobilized men. 91.6% of soldiers' wives lived in villages. Women represented 60% of the agricultural workforce in 1916 and had to take on the tasks of forced laborer and farm manager. They endeavored to maintain correspondence with their mobilized husbands and to place their children in the zemstvos' schools. They expressed their demands more openly: in response to shortages and inflation, "good women's revolts" ("babyi bounty") broke out in the markets. Although they failed to form a political movement, letters and petitions from soldiers' wives reflected a growing discontent with the rich, profiteers, and the imperial family.

=== Workers' discontent ===
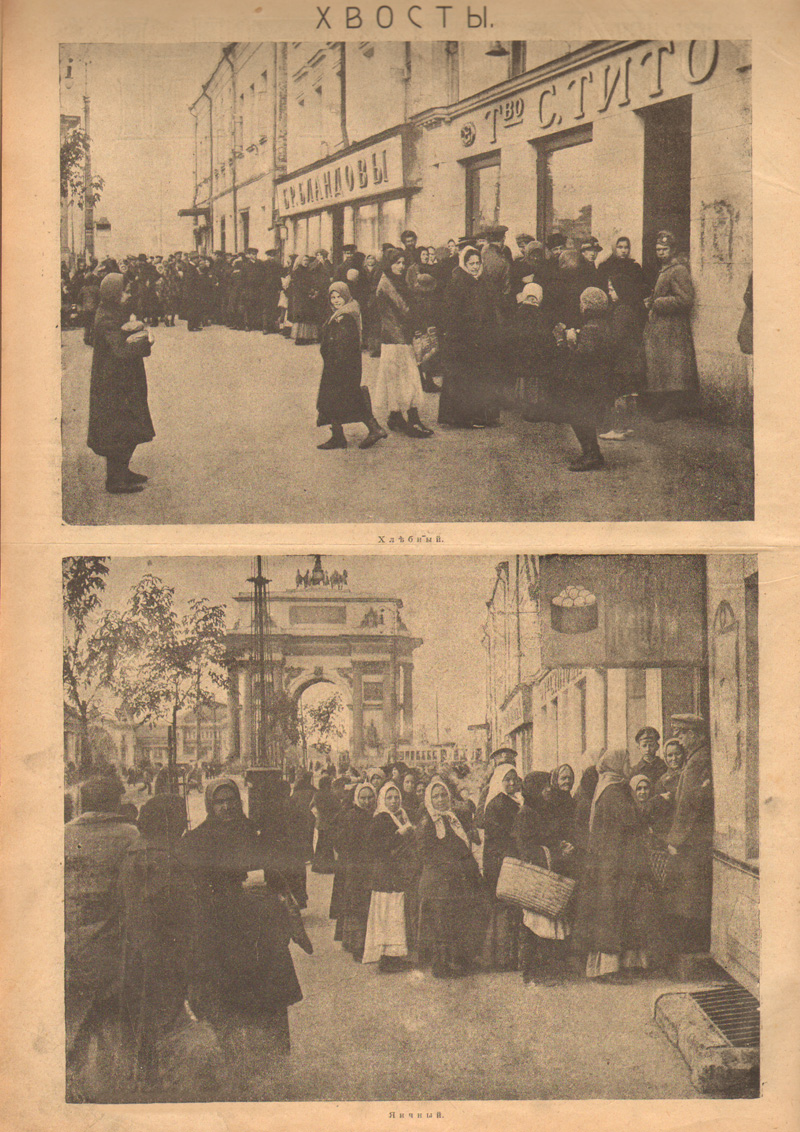
Queues in Moscow, Iskry, no. 39, October 8, 1917.

The development of the war industry was reflected in the rapid growth in the number of workers: 20% more between 1913 and 1916, thanks to the contribution of women, who increased from 30% to 40% of the working population, and displaced persons from the western provinces, at least when they found work to their liking: in Ekaterinoslav (today Dnipro), only a thousand agreed to work in the coal mines when there were 22,000 vacancies to be filled. Chinese and Koreans were also brought to Russia from Europe. However, it is the Russian peasantry that is the great reservoir of manpower, with a million jobs created in industry and construction.

Workers' living conditions deteriorated with inflation and food shortages. Skilled metalworkers, essential to the armaments effort, benefited from wage increases, but unskilled workers and clerical staff did not. From autumn 1915 onwards, queues grew longer in front of stores in the major cities of northern Russia, and by early 1917, a female worker in Petrograd was spending an average of 40 hours a week queuing. Food rations for unskilled workers fell by a quarter, infant mortality doubled, and the number of prostitutes increased by a factor of 4 or 5. Women workers in the provinces, mainly in the textile industry, were numerous but unskilled, therefore vulnerable to lay-offs, poorly organized, and unable to develop a social movement until 1917.

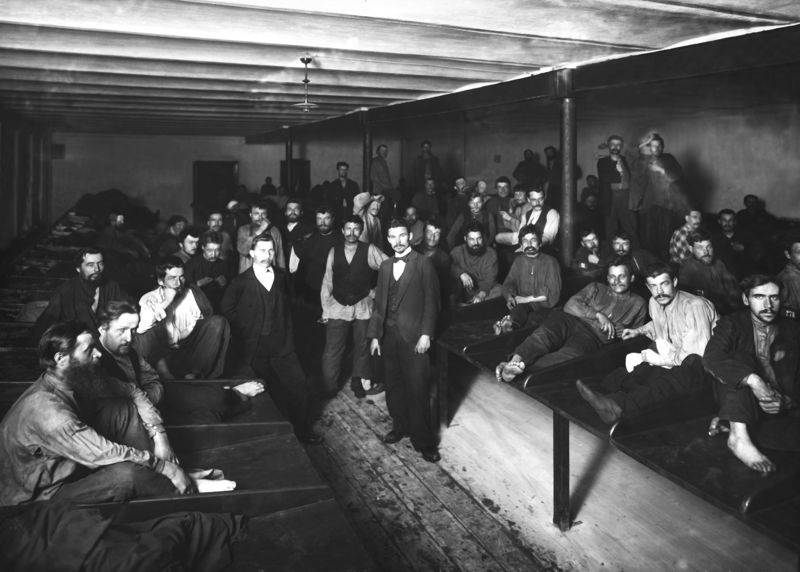
Workers' dormitory in St Petersburg, 1913.

Workers' strikes, which had been significant from 1912 to July 1914, had become rare in the first months of the war: they resumed with vigor in August–September 1915. From 10,000 between August and December 1914, the number of strikers rose to 540,000 in 1915 and 880,000 in 1916. Petrograd's workers, particularly those in the Vyborg district where several large metallurgical and electrical plants were concentrated, were the most politicized. Their demands were not confined to wages, working hours, and conditions: they protested against the brutal repression of industrial strikes in Ivanovo and Kostroma, the dissolution of the Duma, the organization of the War Industries Committee, on which the bosses were represented but the workers were not, and the defeats in Galicia, proof of the carelessness of the authorities. In February–March 1916, workers in the Vyborg district were again in the vanguard against measures to requisition labor and, in November 1916, against the sentencing of sailors from the Baltic fleet and soldiers from the 18th Reserve Infantry regiment. Strikes also marked the anniversaries of the October Manifesto and Bloody Sunday 1905. At the Nikolayev military shipyards, in January–February 1916, strikers produced figures showing that the company was making large profits at workers' expense: the government refused to dialogue, sent in the Cossacks, and threatened the strikers with deportation to Siberia.

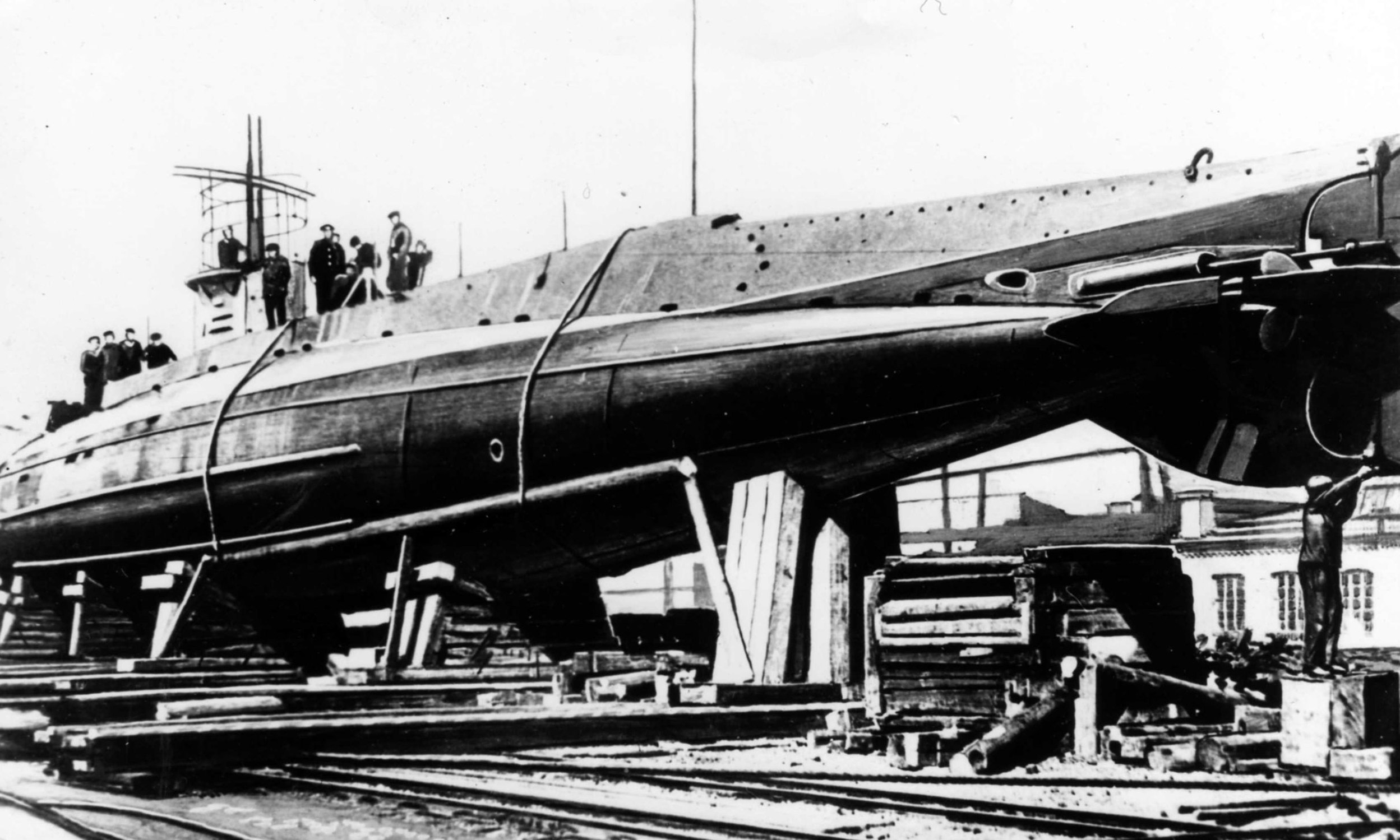
Building an AG-14 submarine in Petrograd, October 1916.

Political parties played little part in these social movements. Most Menshevik and Socialist-Revolutionary leaders rallied to the Sacred Union, and the few internationalist ideologues were in exile, such as the left-wing Mensheviks Trotsky and Alexandra Kollontai, and the Bolsheviks Lenin, Bukharin and Zinoviev. Some of these exiles took part in the conference in Zimmerwald, a Swiss village that had become a meeting place for war opponents in Europe, but their audience in Russia was small: the Bolsheviks, decimated by arrests and emigration, had only 500 militants left in Petrograd at the end of 1914, and even fewer in other cities. At the beginning of 1917, their party, still illegal, had perhaps 10,000 members throughout Russia, including 3,000 in Petrograd. Strike leaders tended to be young, literate workers, most of them non-party members. One of the toughest movements broke out on October 17, 1916, in the Vyborg district of Petrograd, at the Lessner (submarine) and Renault factories, before spreading to other enterprises in the capital. Garrison soldiers, mostly elderly reservists or convalescing wounded, tended to sympathize with the strikers and oppose the police.

== From war to revolution ==
=== February–March 1917: Petrograd in revolution ===
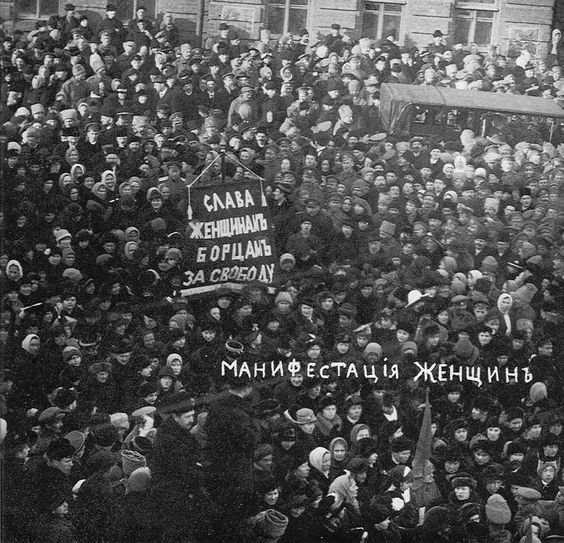
International Women's Day in Petrograd, February 23/March 8, 1917.

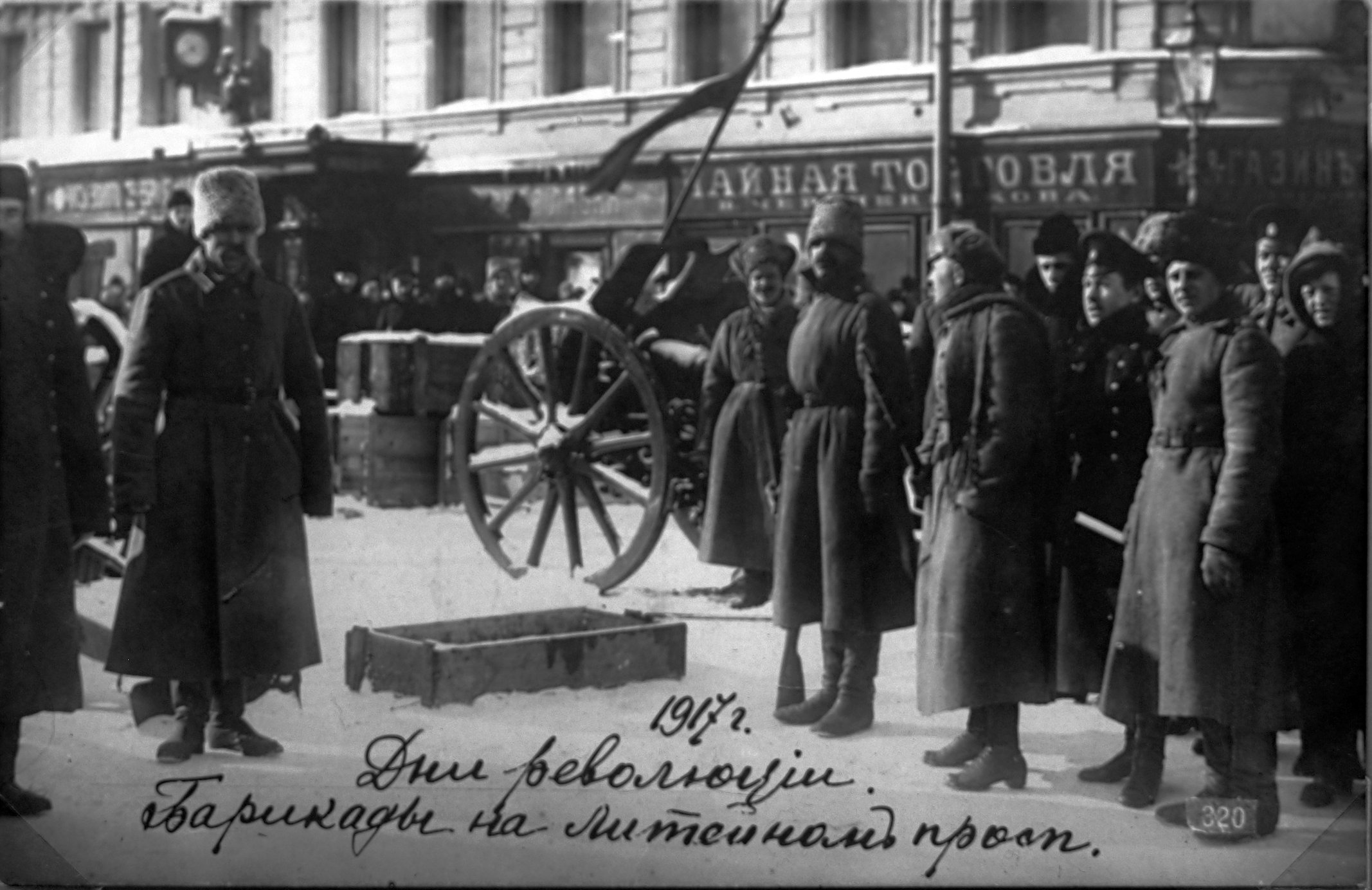
Barricade on Liteïny Prospect during the February Revolution.

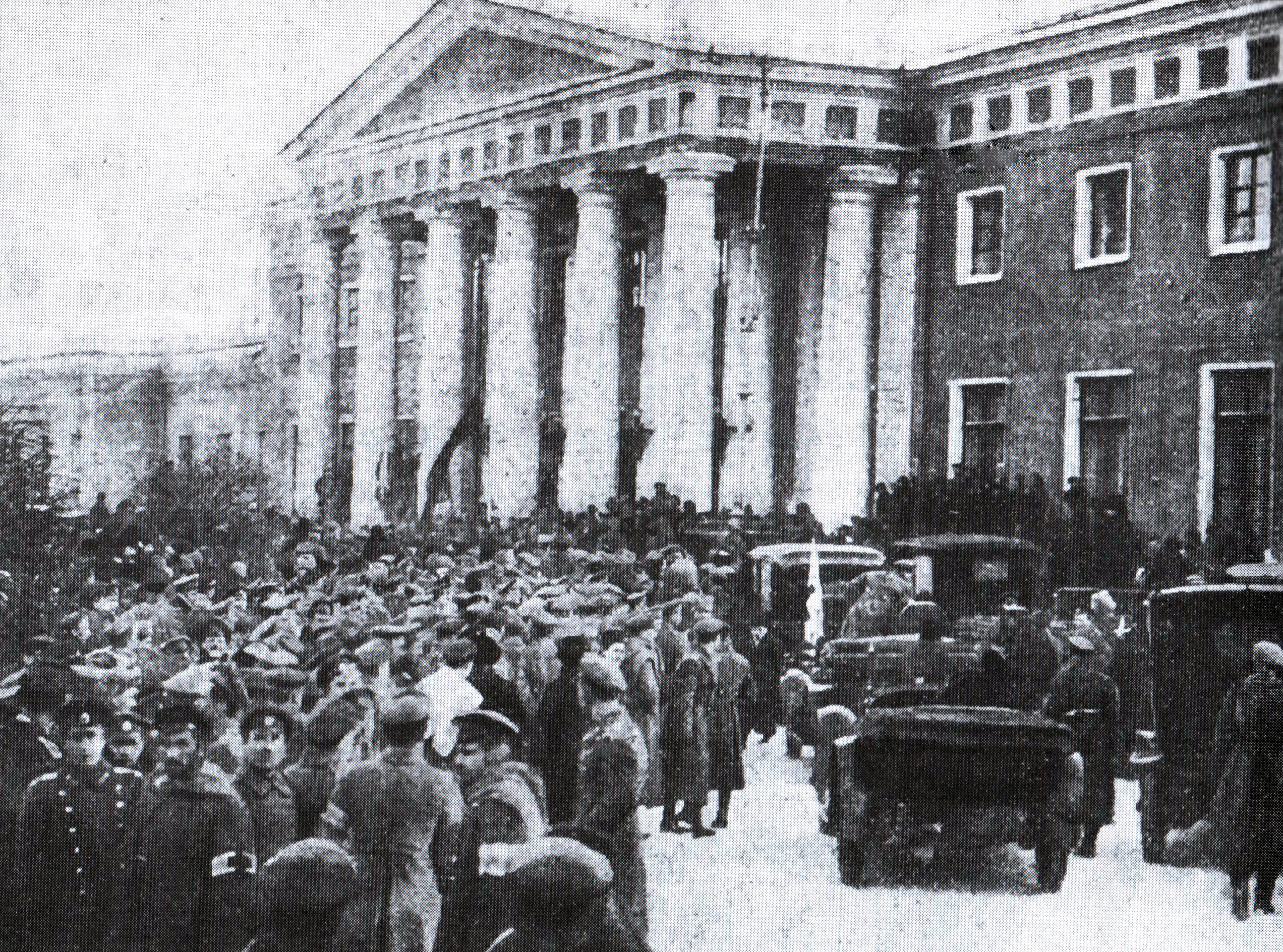
Soldiers and demonstrators in front of the Tauride Palace, March 1/14, 1917.

February 1917 was a particularly cold month in Petrograd (−15 °C), with frost paralyzing rail and river transport and interrupting supplies. Queues lengthened in front of bakeries, increasing popular discontent.

On February 23/March 8, International Women's Day, large crowds of demonstrators gather in the city center to demand equal rights; in the Vyborg district, women workers signal their strike with shouts of "Bread!" and "Down with the Tsar!".

In the days that followed, the strike spread, as workers bypassed police roadblocks by crossing the frozen canals and tried to reach Nevsky Prospect. The hesitant Cossacks eventually sympathized with the demonstrators. On March 10 (February 25 o.s.) Nicholas II, who was at his Mogilev headquarters, telegraphed General Sergey Khabalov, governor of the Petrograd Military District, with orders to "put down the revolt tomorrow".

On the morning of February 26/March 11, following the Tsar's order, the Semionovsky, Pavlovsky, and Volynsky regiments fired on the crowd. The demonstrators invaded the Volynski barracks. NCOs such as Sergeant Sergei Kirpitchnikov and Sergeant Fedor Linde persuaded the soldiers in their regiments to fraternize with the workers and mutiny their officers.

On February 27/March 12, the military garrison rallied to the insurrection, but clashes continued with the police. The mob set fire to police stations and the courthouse and freed 8,000 prisoners, most of them common criminals, which immediately led to looting. Statues, coats of arms, and other imperial symbols were vandalized. The insurgents set up a draft organization, a council of workers and soldiers, which became the Petrograd Soviet: soldiers, often peasant recruits, formed the clear majority. Meanwhile, a group of Duma deputies returned to the Tauride Palace and attempted to form a democratic provisional government. The capital's military forces were completely disorganized, and General Nikolai Ivanov, tasked with suppressing the insurrection with troops from the front, realized that the revolt was spreading to his men. The Tsar, unsure of what to do, tried to return to Tsarkoe Tselo, where his family lived but found the railroad blocked by striking railwaymen. Finally, General Mikhail Alekseyev, Chief of the General Staff, and the other generals concluded that there was no other way to restore calm than to depose the Tsar and hand over power to the Duma. Nicholas II abdicated on March 2/15, 1917.

=== "The freest country in the world" ===
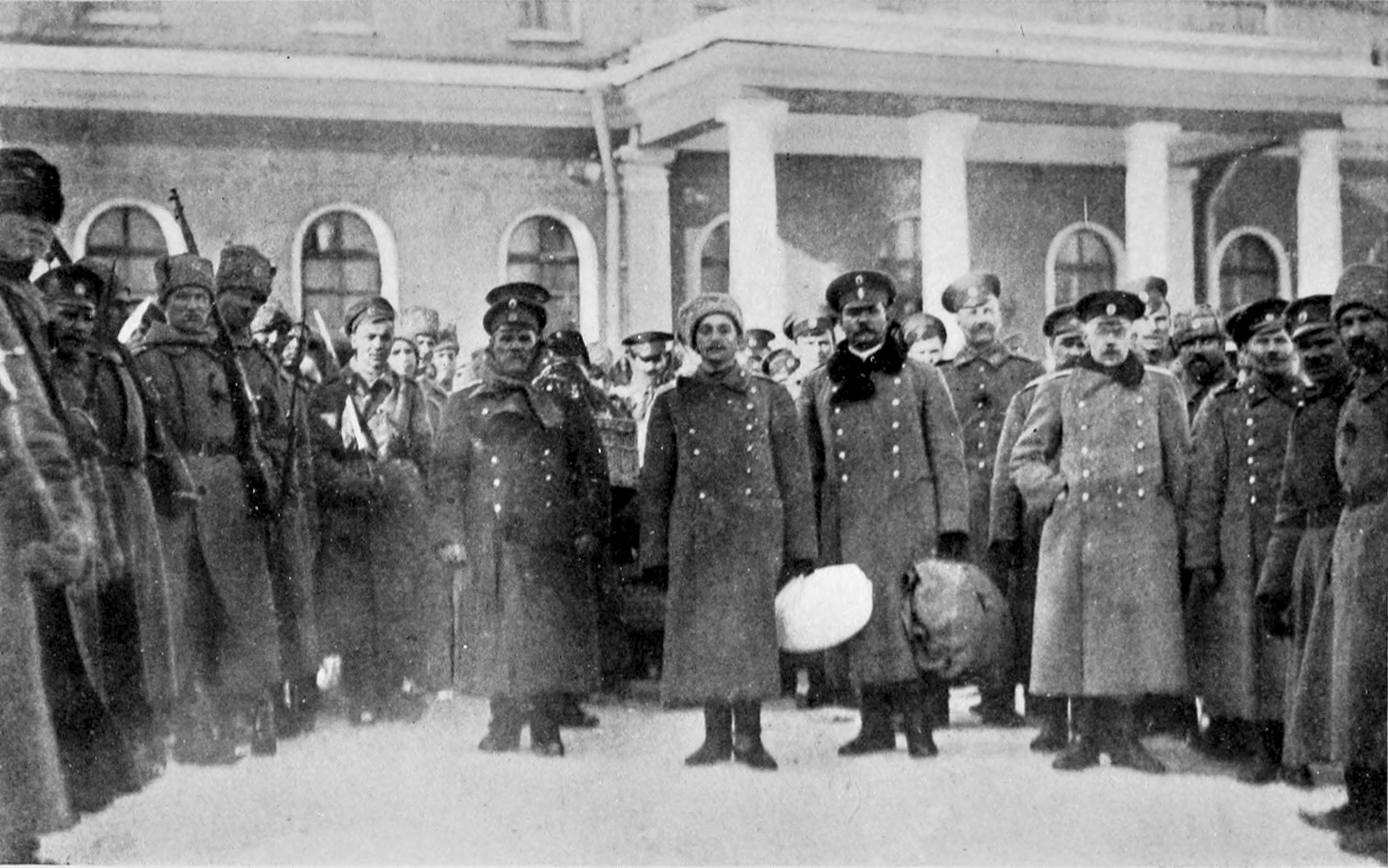
Soldiers arrest officials during the February 1917 revolution.

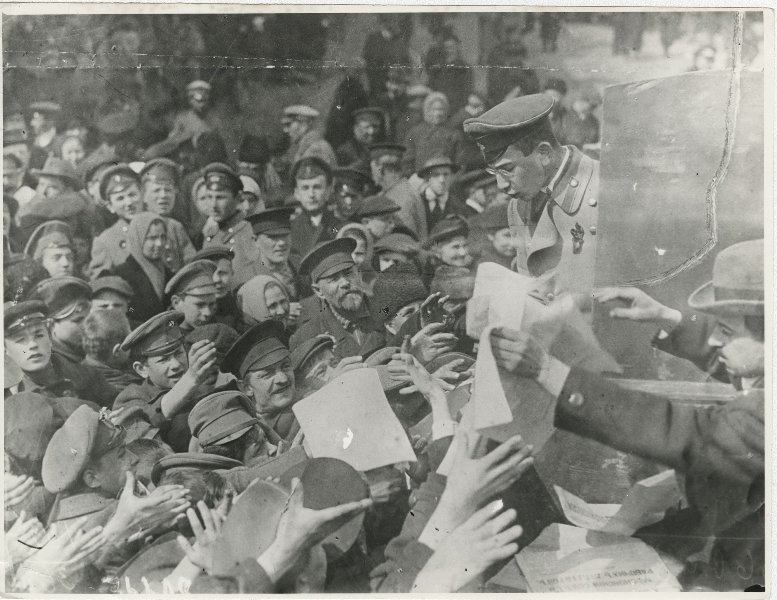
Distribution of newspapers to soldiers in April 1917.

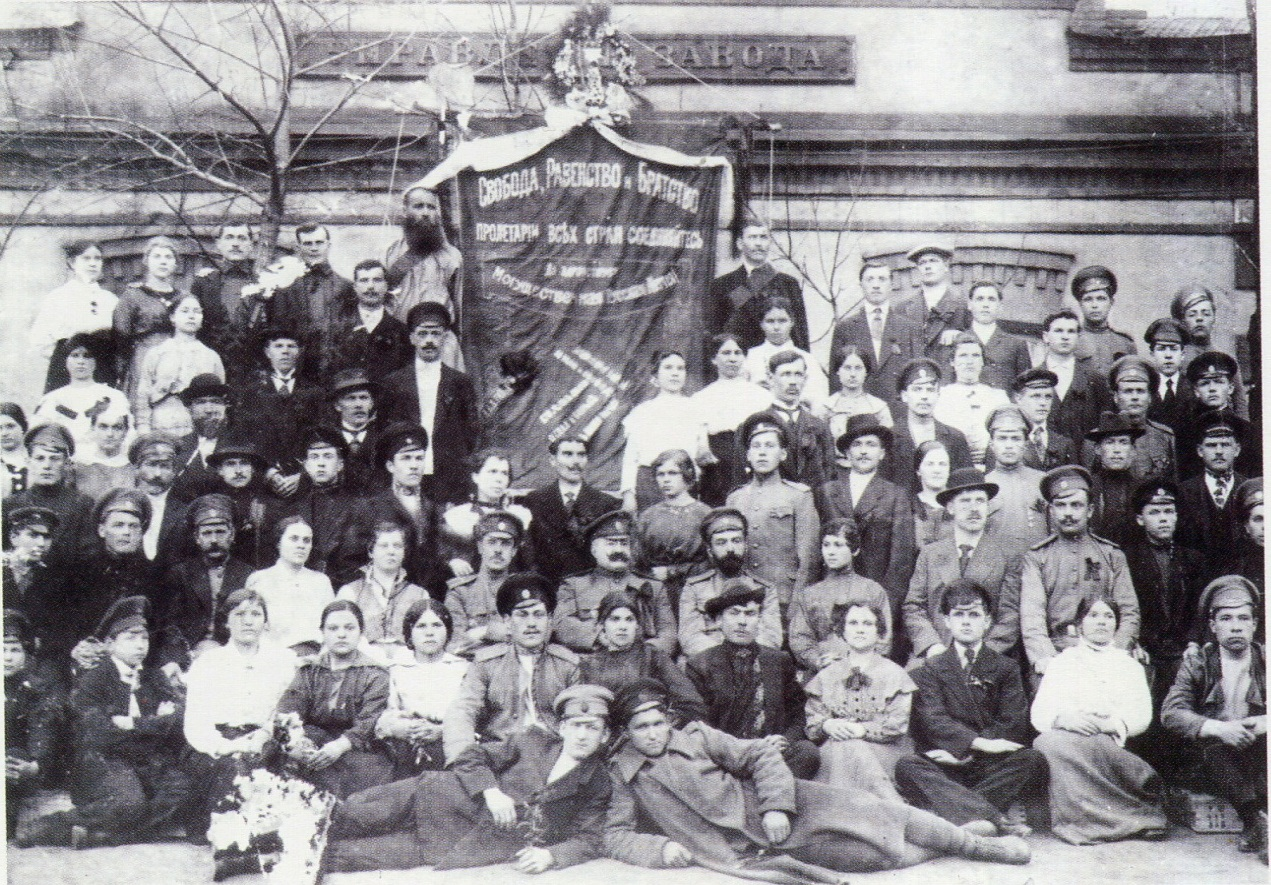
May 1, 1917, in Luhansk.

While the latest fighting pitted insurgent soldiers against officers entrenched in the General Staff, the Admiralty, and the Winter Palace, a temporary committee of the Duma strove to restore a semblance of order. It ordered the arrest of ministers and senior officials, partly to shield them from popular violence. On March 15, the day of the Tsar's abdication, a provisional government was formed: Prince Lvov was both head of government and Minister of the Interior, Alexander Guchkov was Minister of War and the Navy, and Pavel Milyukov was Minister of Foreign Affairs. Most of the ministers came from the Zemgor, the War Industries Committee, and the liberal parties in the Duma. Aleksandr Kerensky, a representative of the Petrograd Soviet, was appointed Minister of Justice and quickly became the most popular figure in the government.

The Petrograd Soviet, housed in the other wing of the Tauride Palace and the only one to have a certain ascendancy over the crowds, formed a second power opposite the Duma. On March 14, amid a boisterous crowd of soldiers, he drew up Order No.1, calling on all units to elect committees and send their representatives to the soviet; at the same time, he abolished the outward signs of respect considered to be a relic of serfdom. Officers were no longer addressed as "Your High Nobility", but as "Sir General", and they were no longer required to address their men as "Sir", nor were they obliged to salute them off-duty. Soviets asked the provisional government to accept a series of conditions: amnesty for all political prisoners; freedom of speech, assembly, and press; an end to all discrimination based on class, religion or nationality; immediate dissolution of the police force, to be replaced by a people's militia with elected officers; general elections by universal suffrage; a guarantee that soldiers who had taken part in the revolution would not be disarmed or sent to the front; full civil rights for soldiers off duty.

News of the revolution spread rapidly throughout the country and to the front. Soldiers wore red ribbons, formed committees, bullied and sometimes killed commanders who refused to accept the new rules. The members of the committees, politicized soldiers, and non-commissioned officers were generally in favor of continuing the war and accepted the restoration of discipline as long as the officers showed respect for their men. Congresses of soldiers' delegates were held on the fronts and in the armies, often with the participation of delegates from civilian soviets: that of the Western Front, held in Minsk in April, brought together 850 delegates, 15% of whom were civilians

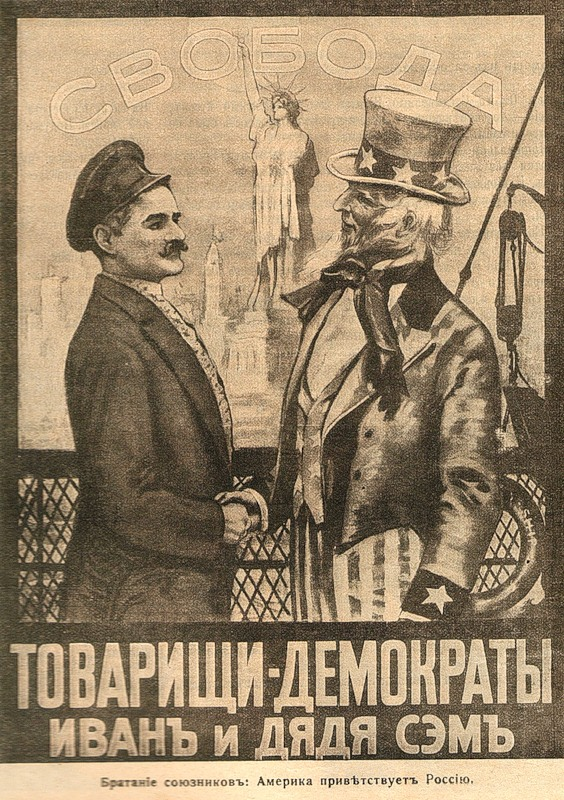
"Democratic comrades: Ivan and Uncle Sam", poster for the Russian-American alliance, 1917.

The opinions of Russians in the aftermath of the revolution are recorded in thousands of letters addressed to the Duma, the Petrograd soviet, or Kerensky. The workers were the most politicized, calling for a constituent assembly; they were generally confident in the new regime and made mostly moderate demands: better wages, a 40-hour working week, job security, workers' control over company management, but no expropriation. Many peasants demanded immediate peace and the division of large estates: their horizon was that of small family property, sufficient to ensure equal subsistence for all. Soldiers and sailors also wanted peace, but in a more measured way, through negotiation in agreement with the Allies; above all, they demanded reform of military discipline and to be treated as equals by their officers. National minorities demanded either independence (Finns, Poles, Lithuanians, Latvians) or autonomy and recognition of their rights within the Russian framework (Ukrainians, Jews). The Tatars and other Muslims also demanded peace with the Ottoman Empire.

The Provisional Government was in favor of continuing the war alongside the Entente, but not without contradictions: the Petrograd Soviet set the objective of peace without annexations or indemnities, while Miliukov, in charge of Foreign Affairs, wanted to assert the Russian Empire's old claims to Constantinople and the Turkish Straits to the Allies. On March 27, the Provisional Government published a declaration of war aims in line with the Soviet program. Thousands of workers demonstrated to demand the resignation of Miliukov and other "bourgeois" ministers and an end to the "imperialist war". Alongside France and the United Kingdom, Russia could count on a new ally, the United States, which became its main supplier of money and equipment.

=== The break-up of nations ===
The provisional government soon found itself confronted by the demands of nationalities. In its manifesto of March 7/20, it claimed to be the full successor to Russian imperial sovereignty. The Grand Duchy of Finland occupied a special position within the Empire: its democratic institutions had been suspended after the 1905 revolution. During the war, the Finns were not mobilized, but the Russian administration demanded a heavy financial contribution from them while hindering their trade with Sweden and, indirectly, with Germany. The German general staff encouraged the creation of a small anti-Russian independence army, the Finnish Jägers. Finnish nationalists argue that the Tsar's abdication puts an end to the personal union with Russia and that power reverts to the Finnish Diet: Faced with the intransigence of the provisional government, the Finns, supported by the Bolsheviks and part of the Russian opposition, proclaimed their independence on June 23, 1917. Kerensky retaliated on July 21, 1917, when the Russian army occupied Helsingfors.

Ukrainians, like Poles, were divided between the empires: 3 million served in the Russian armies and 250,000 in those of the Habsburgs. Russia appealed to Panslavism, while Austria-Hungary considered encouraging Ukrainian nationalism against the Russians: this project came to nothing, as it clashed with Austro-Hungarian and German attempts to rally the Poles. In the wake of the February–March 1917 revolution, Ukrainian demands were reawakened and an assembly, the Central Rada, was formed in Kiev, bringing together political parties and cultural and professional associations. It held its first session on March 17 and convened an All-Ukrainian National Congress from April 17 to 21. The Ukrainians demand a democratic and federal regime, broad autonomy for Ukraine and representation at the future peace conference. The military also became politicized, holding the first All-Ukrainian Military Congress in Kiev from May 18 to 25, 1917, presided over by Symon Petliura. However, the authority of the Rada came into competition with that of the Provisional Government, which appointed new governors, most of them Russians, and with that of the soldiers' and workers' Soviets, which relied above all on the non-Ukrainian minorities – Russians, Jews and Poles. At the end of May 1917, the Provisional Government rejected the demands of the Ukrainians, who entered into a logic of separation, formed a General Secretariat to act as a regional government, and convened a Ukrainian Constituent Assembly.

The Muslims of the European provinces, the Volga Tatars, the Bashkirs, and the Crimean Tatars, who had long been Russian subjects, had been loyal to the Empire and had accepted mobilization, seeing it as an opportunity to demand equal rights. The same could not be said of Russian Turkestan, where the introduction of conscription in 1916 triggered a revolt by the Muslims against the Russian settlers. The Muslims of Turkestan were eventually disarmed and 100,000 of them were conscripted into labor battalions until Kerensky's government granted them amnesty in 1917.

Nationalities of the Russian Empire from war to revolution

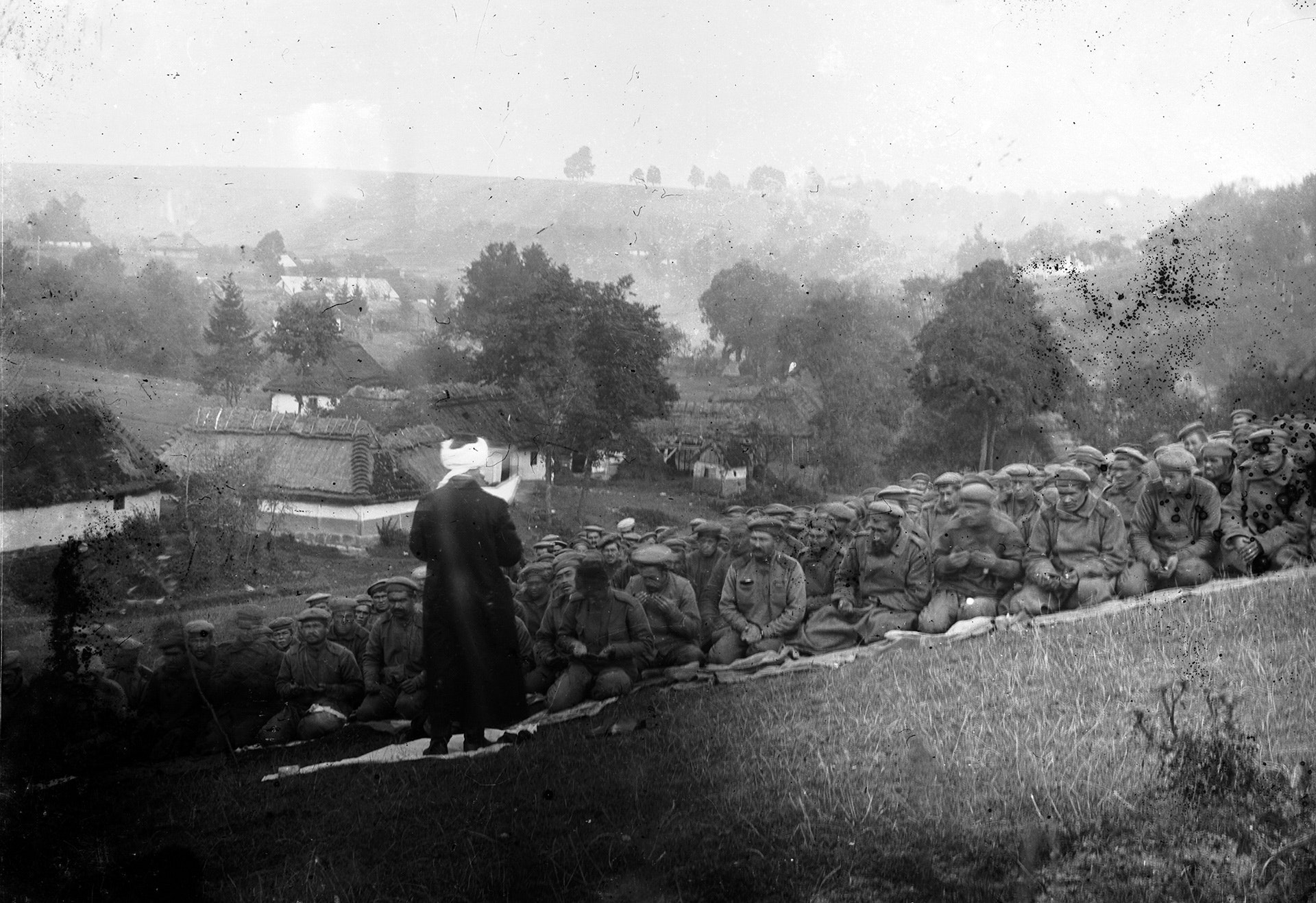
Tatar soldiers with their chaplain celebrating Kurban Bayram near Brest-Litovsk in 1914.

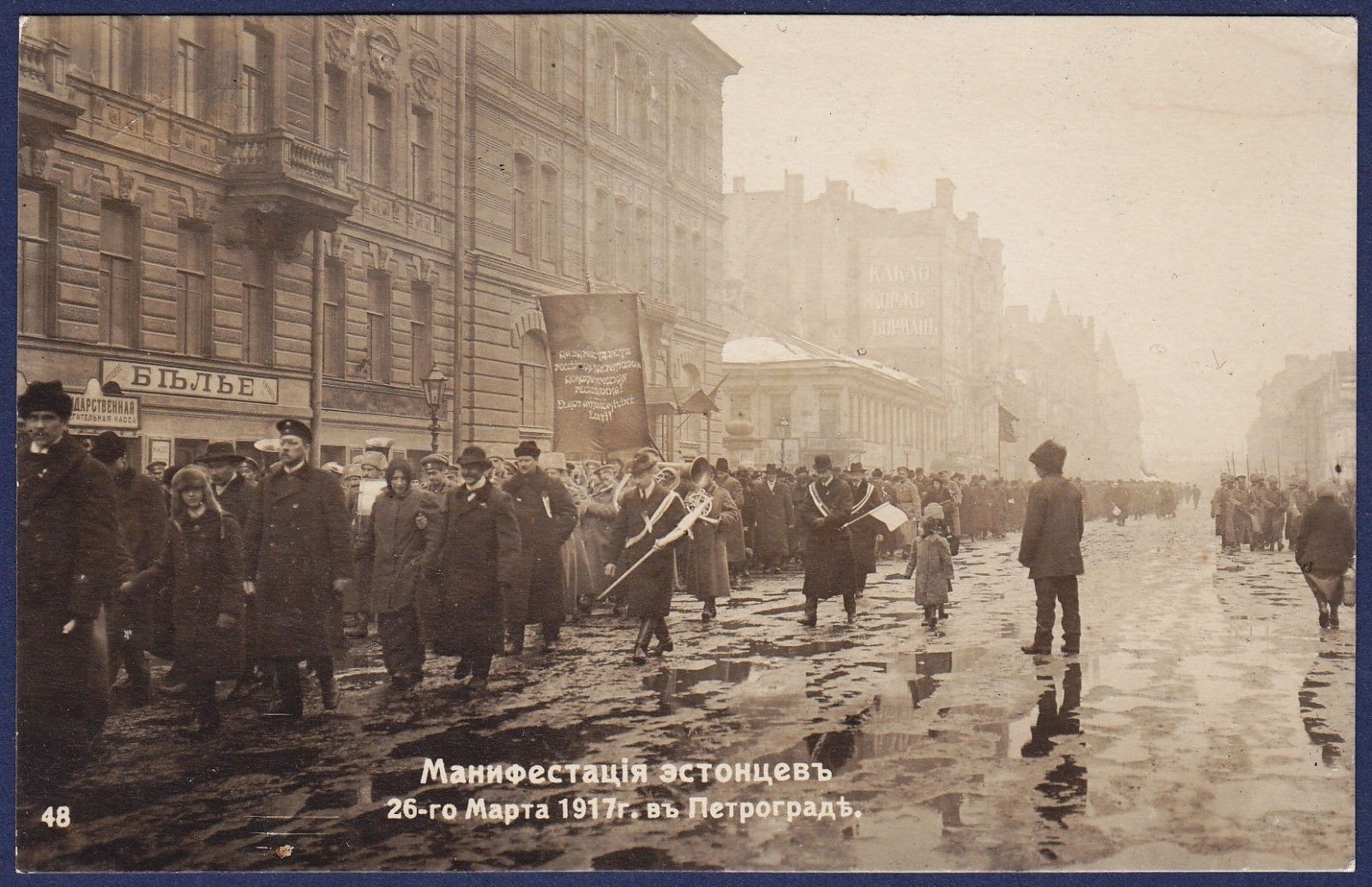
Demonstration by Estonians in Petrograd in March 1917.

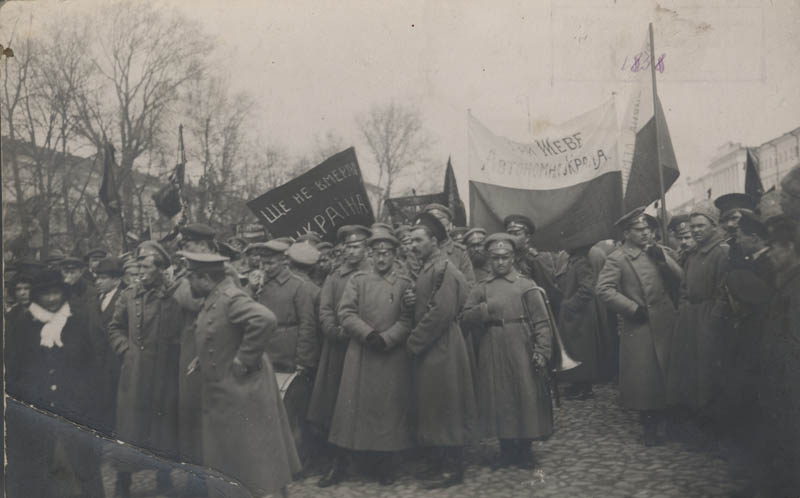
Soldiers' meeting in Ukraine in 1917.

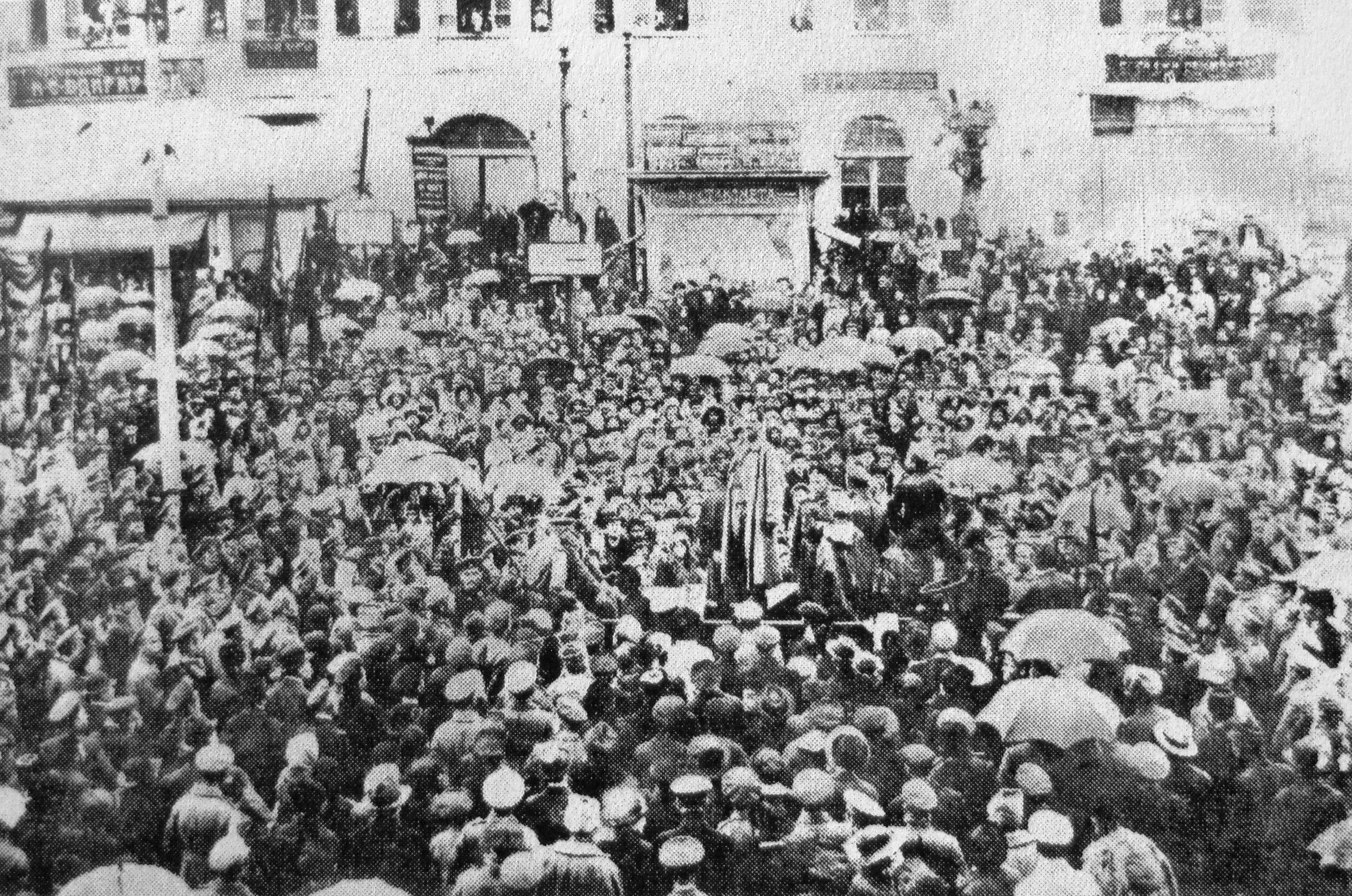
Demonstration in Tbilissi, capital of the Caucasus Viceroyalty, in February 1917.

=== The countryside revolution ===
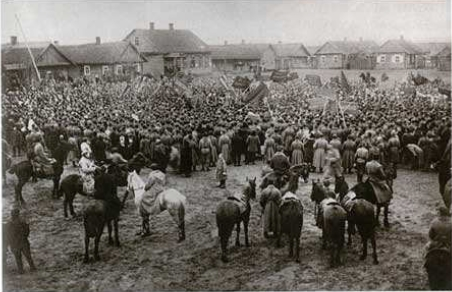
The revolution in Maladetchna (Minsk government) in 1917.

The fall of imperial power led to a wave of uprisings in the countryside. However, their form and scale varied greatly from one locality to another, ranging from peaceful protests to murderous looting. Generally speaking, in the first phase, the demonstrations were relatively peaceful. The villagers, armed with guns, and tools, gather at the sound of the bell and march on the manor. The lord or his steward, if they had not already fled, were obliged to sign a deed ceding to the demands: lower rent, compulsory sale of grain, tools and livestock at the price set by the peasants. The rural community regained the status it had lost with Stolypin's reforms and appropriated the power of the former lords; according to a peasant adage, "Ours was the lord, ours is the land". The "separator" peasants who had fenced off their lands had to return to the collective soil, willingly or unwillingly.

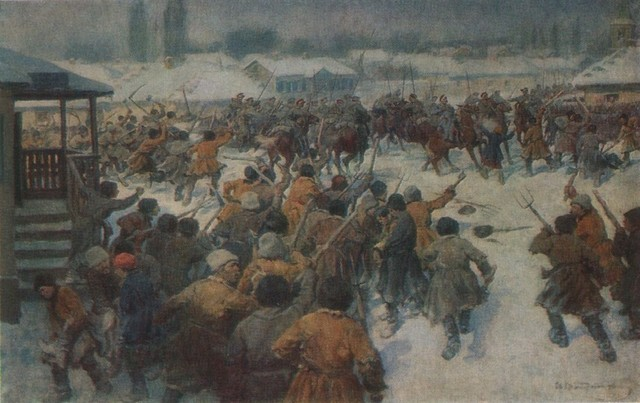
Peasant revolt in Sorotchintsy (Poltava government): the memory of the repression of 1905–1908 contributed to the radicalization of the peasants in 1917. Canvas by Ivan Vladimirov (ru) (1869–1947).

As summer approached, the peasants took possession of the land so that they could harvest and sow it. The return of mobilized soldiers, whether on Easter leave or deserters, helped to radicalize the movement. Manors were burned or ransacked. In May 1917, the appointment of a Socialist-Revolutionary, Viktor Chernov, to the Ministry of Agriculture, seemed to vindicate the peasants' demands. However, the government lacked the legal means to restore calm or formalize land redistribution. The peasants, unable to see the expected reforms coming, proceeded to "black sharing" (illegal), often accompanied by violence against the lords, the "separators" and the clergy, as well as the destruction of agricultural machinery, which reduced employment. There was a lull in the movement during the summer, with heavy agricultural work and Kerensky's government taking relative control of the army and the courts, but the autumn saw a new outbreak of violence that the Bolsheviks would later interpret as a harbinger of proletarian revolution. Hundreds of manor houses were burnt down or destroyed by peasants in the provinces of Tambov, Penza, Voronezh, Saratov, Kazan, Orel, Tula, and Ryazan.

The election of cantonal zemstvos in August, followed by that of the Constituent Assembly in November, saw contrasting results in rural areas: low turnout in the Novgorod region, high turnout in the Black Lands, brawls and ballot-box burning in the Kiev government. In general, it was the Socialist-Revolutionaries and, regionally, the Ukrainian Socialists who scored the highest and won over the rural communities. However, the Bolsheviks managed to make inroads in rural cantons close to towns, railroads, and garrisons.

Soldiers of peasant origin closely followed developments in their home villages, often introducing their demands. In September 1917, soldiers of the 10th Army wrote to the Minister of Agriculture, Semion Maslov: "We were promised land, but now it's obvious that they don't want to give it to us (...) If you want the army's victory, you have to give more benefits to the soldiers who have been at the front since the first days of mobilization (...) the poor peasant without property, who doesn't own a plot of land, sits in a cold, damp trench, and in return, he only gets words".

=== The military impasse ===
The Allies waited for Russia to continue its war effort. In March 1917, the French called for a major offensive in the east to support their own Chemin des Dames offensive, but General Alekseyev replied that this was impossible: the thaw had made the roads impassable, horses and fodder were in short supply, and the troops had lost all discipline. On the contrary, Brusilov, commander of the Southwest Front, asserted that a spring offensive was possible and that his soldiers were "burning to fight". Alekseyev finally convinced himself that only an offensive could rectify the situation. On March 30, he wrote to Minister Alexander Guchkov:

If we don't go on the offensive, we won't escape the obligation to fight, but we'll simply condemn ourselves to fighting at a time and place convenient to the enemy. And if we don't cooperate with our allies, we can't expect them to come to our aid when we need them. Army disorder is no less damaging to defense than an offensive. Even if we are not fully assured of success, we must go on the offensive.

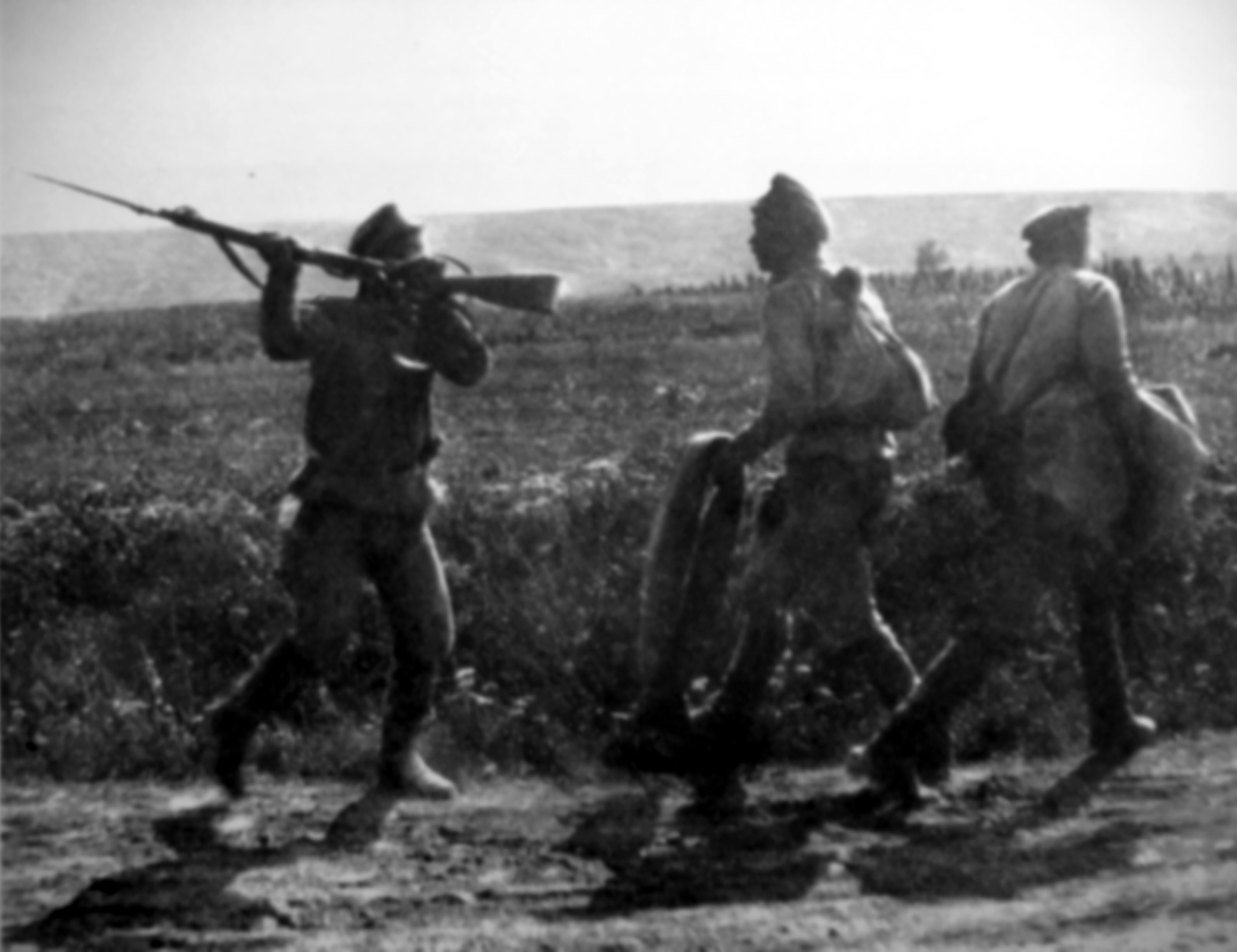
A soldier arresting two deserters, Russia, 1917.

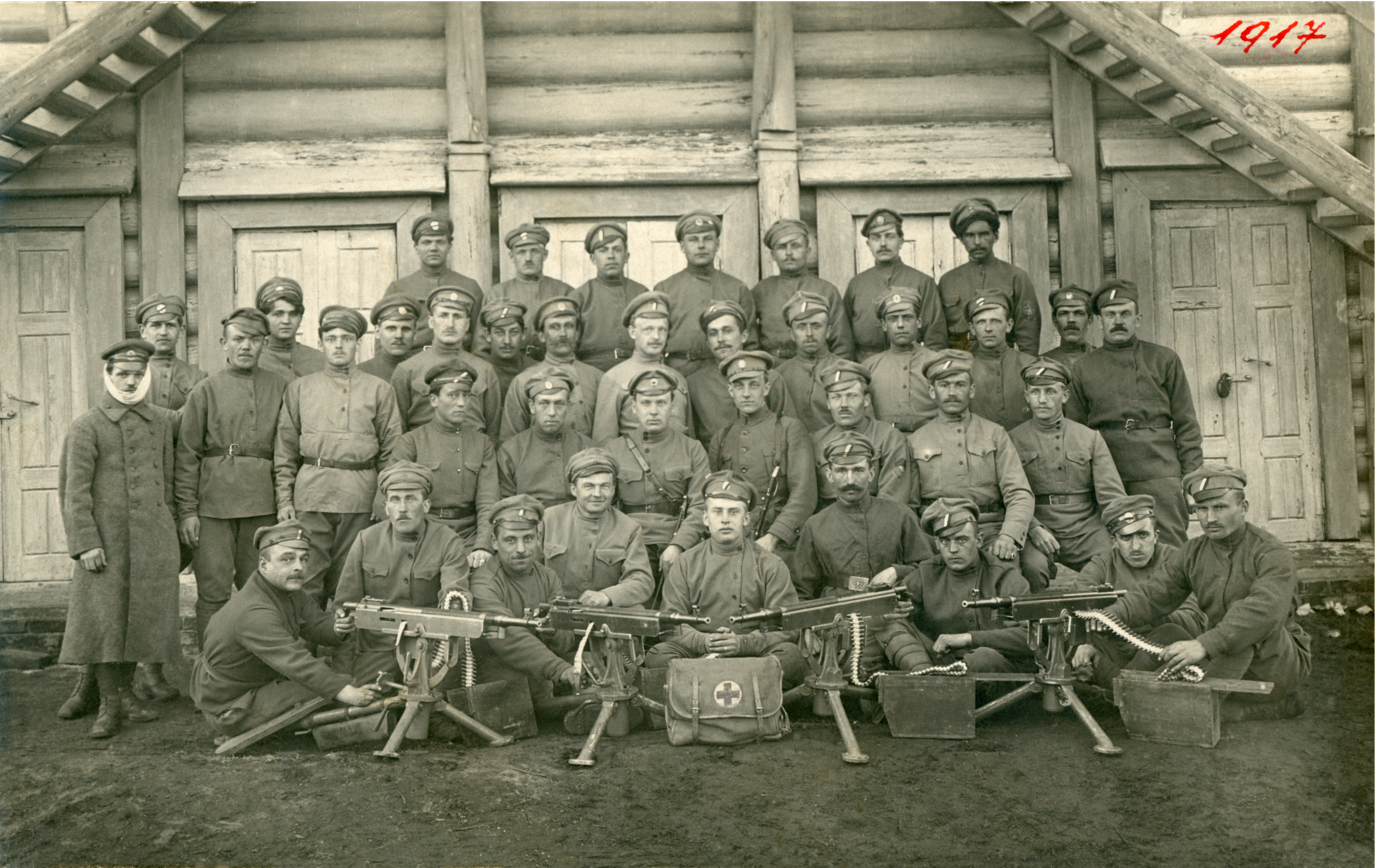
Soldiers of the 6th Rifle Regiment of the Czechoslovak Legion in Ukraine, 1917.

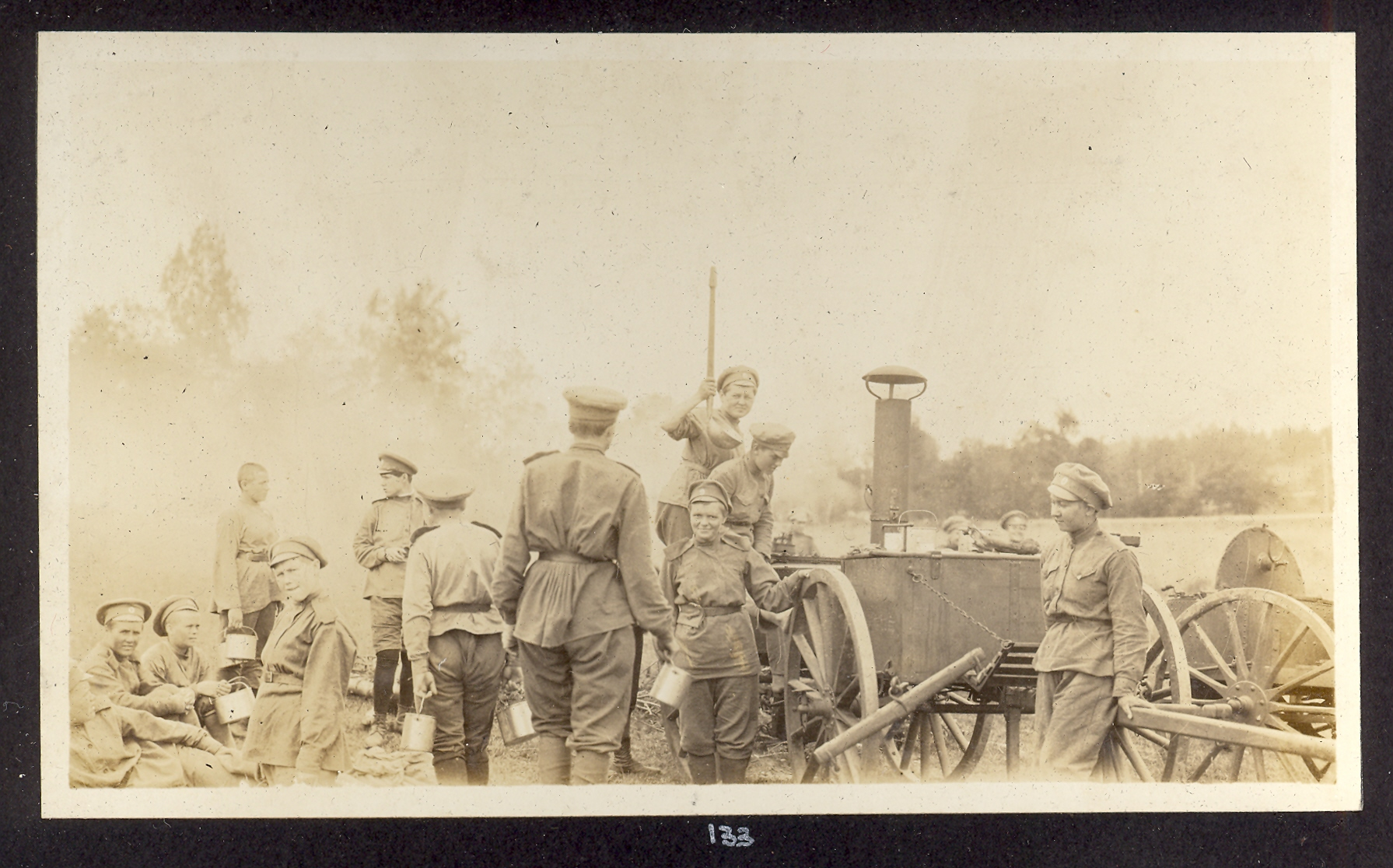
Kitchen on wheels for female soldiers of the "Death Battalions", summer 1917.

Soldier morale is the most unpredictable element. Desertion has been a recurring problem in the army since the start of the war, along with self-mutilation and mental disorders such as shell shock, but, until early 1917, it remains on a controllable scale: official statistics, though incomplete, indicate no more than 100,000 to 150,000 unlawful absences at any one time, and many missing men, after a visit to their families or some time wandering around towns and railway stations, eventually return to the front. Penalties for desertion were graduated: flogging on the first attempt, hard labor on the second; the death penalty was only applied on the third repeat offense and quite rarely, as it took a long time to trace the deserter's unit of origin and organize a military tribunal. The picture changed with the February Revolution: discipline was massively questioned, soldiers criticized their officers, questioned the quality of the camp or the relevance of orders, and sometimes refused to march. In spring, the front was remarkably calm. An Austro-Hungarian soldier wrote in a letter: "The Russians are sitting on the parapet in broad daylight, taking off their shirts and looking for lice. No one is firing on our side [...] Only the Russian artillery fires from time to time. The commander of [their] artillery is a Frenchman. The Russians put the word out that they wanted to kill him". During the Easter truce, on the front of the Russian 7th Army, the Germans encouraged fraternization with the Russian soldiers facing them, telling them that they did not have to wage war for the sole interests of France and the United Kingdom.

Alexander Kerensky, appointed Minister of War and the Navy on May 18, 1917, visited Brusilov on the front near Ternopil and endorsed the idea of a major spring offensive: on May 22, he had Brusilov appointed Commander-in-Chief of the army, despite the Stavka's misgivings. Brusilov believed that democratizing the army would strengthen its patriotism and, on May 24, he obtained the restoration of the hierarchy and punishments. Kerensky's optimism was sustained by the entry of the United States into the First World War, the Petrograd Soviet's rallying to the cause of national defense, the patriotic campaigns of the constitutional-democrats (liberal right), and the many admirers who saw in him the savior of Russia, called upon to play a decisive role in the victory of the democracies. However, as Brusilov toured the front, he realized that defeatist ideas were gaining ground: more and more soldiers wanted immediate peace, to return to their villages, and to benefit from land distribution. The Bolsheviks' anti-war propaganda, in the form of underground newspapers such as Soldiers' Truth and Truth from the Trenches, had only a limited circulation, but mutinies broke out in May and June 1917, in units of the Southwest Front, in the absence of any Bolshevik organization.

Russian offensive of July 1917 (in pink, to the south) and Austro-German counter-offensive (in purple, to the north).

Since the spring, a considerable effort has been made to rearm and equip the troops. At least some units had high morale and believed they were fighting for their freedom: the 8th Army (General Lavr Kornilov), relatively untouched by revolutionary unrest, the Czechoslovak Legion, made up of Czech and Slovak deserters from the Austro-Hungarian army, and the "Death Battalions" made up of volunteer Russian women. The offensive, launched on June 30, 1917, by the 11th, 7th, and 8th Armies in Galicia and Bukovina, met with partial success against the Austro-Hungarians: the 8th Army broke through the Austro-Hungarian 2nd Army, where part of the 19th Division, made up of Czechs, crossed over to the Russian side.

However, the initial impetus of the offensive soon ran out. One corps commander recounted how, on the first day, his men seized three lines of trenches, capturing 1,400 Germans and a large number of machine guns, while his artillery eliminated most of the opposing batteries. However, as soon as night fell, his soldiers abandoned the ground they had conquered, leaving only their leaders and a handful of men behind. After a few days, the Russian offensive ran out of steam, and soldiers increasingly refused to go to the front, while German reinforcements poured in to consolidate the Austro-Hungarian lines. A German-Austro-Hungarian counter-offensive, from July 19 to August 2, pushed the Russians back towards Volhynia. In many places, the Germans and Austro-Hungarians found the Russian lines already abandoned. A simultaneous offensive by the Northern Front, aimed at driving the Germans away from Riga, was similarly a complete failure. The morale of the Russian army collapsed, and at least 170,000 men deserted, commandeering trains on the pretext of going to harvest. The death penalty in Russia, which had been abolished on March 12, 1917, by one of the first decisions of the Provisional Government, was reinstated on July 12: courts-martial made up of 3 officers and 3 soldiers immediately judged soldiers guilty of murder, rape, looting and calls for disobedience at the scene of the crime, with no possibility of appeal or intermediate punishment.

Russia at war as seen by the French press in 1917

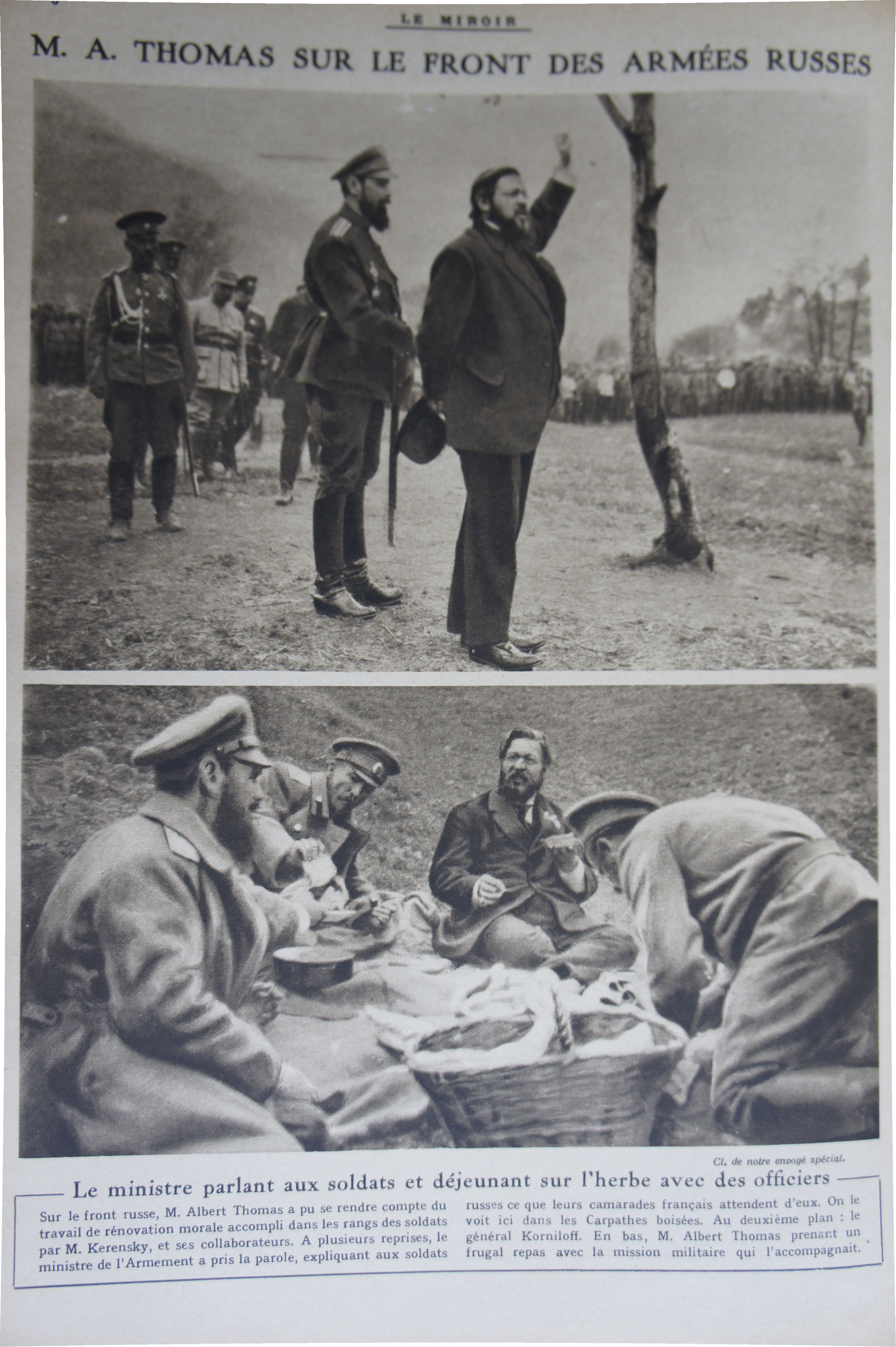
French Minister Albert Thomas and Russian General Lavr Kornilov visiting the front in the wooded Carpathians, Le Miroir, July 8, 1917.

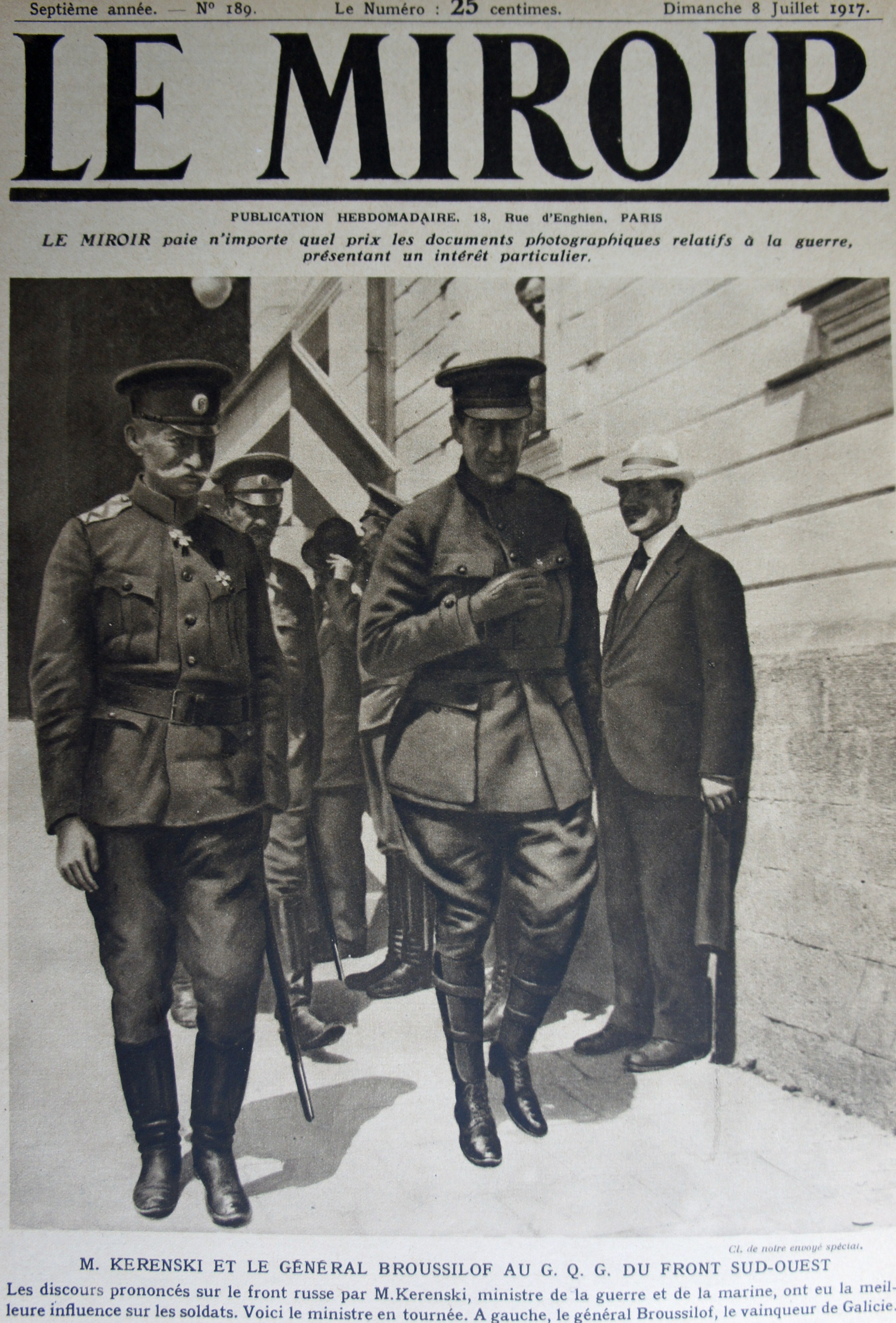
General Aleksei Brusilov, Commander-in-Chief, and War Minister Alexander Kerensky on the Southwest Front, Le Miroir, July 8, 1917.

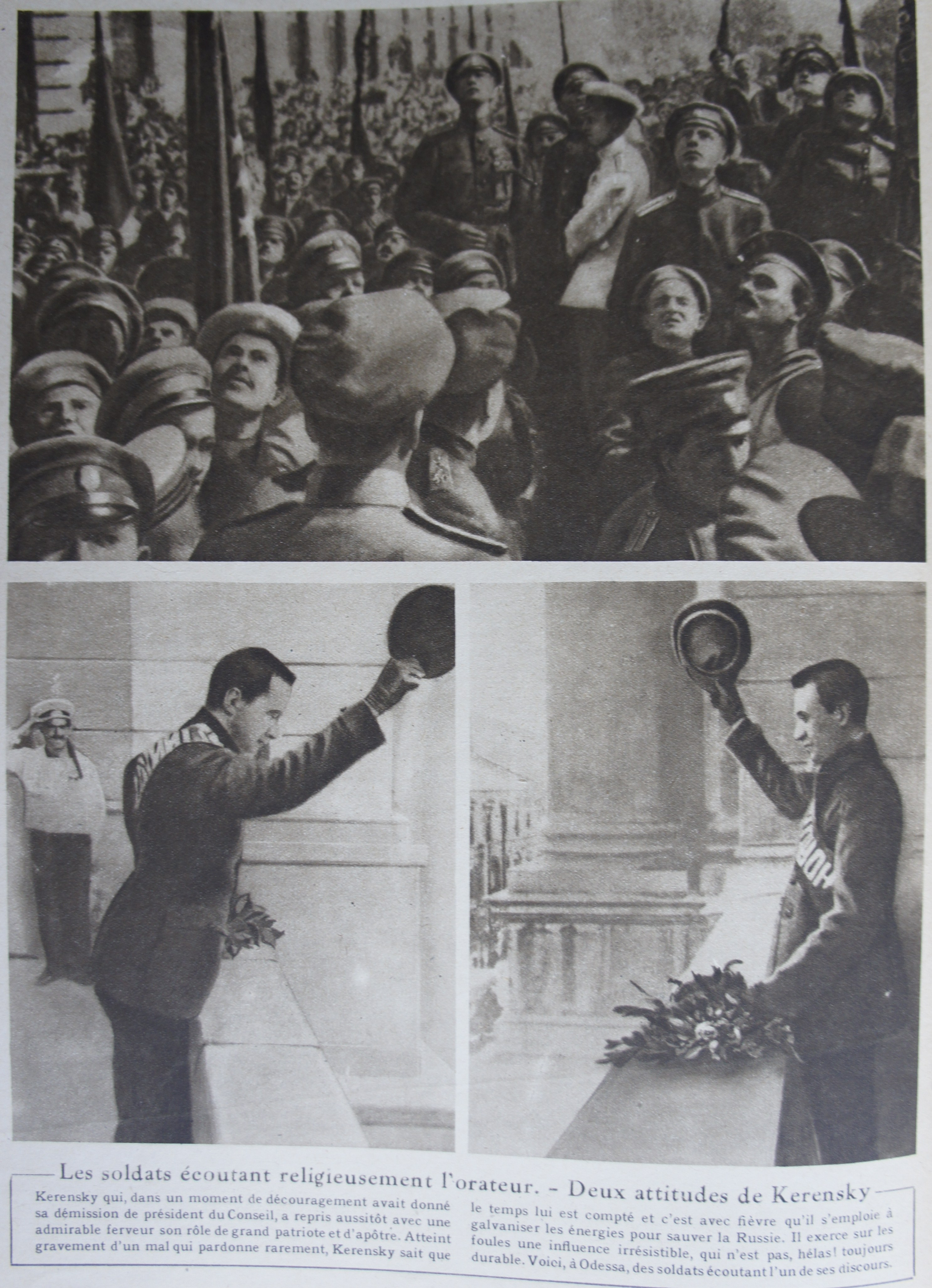
Alexander Kerensky haranguing soldiers in Odessa, Le Miroir, August 19, 1917.

=== Last days of the Provisional Government ===
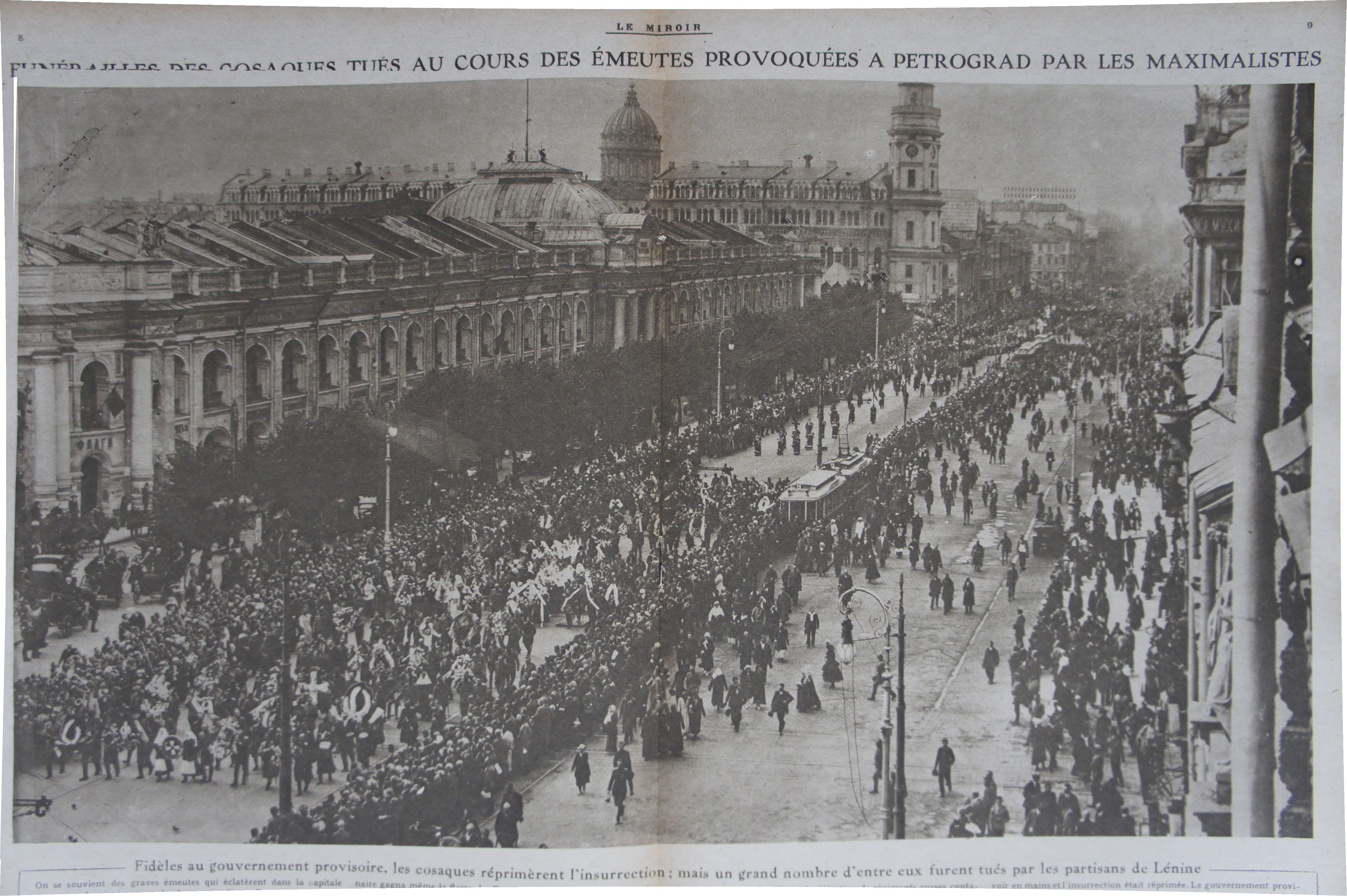
Official funeral for Cossacks killed in clashes with the Bolsheviks during the days of July 1917. Le Miroir, September 2, 1917.

Dissension within the Provisional Government deepened. The Minister of Agriculture, Viktor Chernov, provisionally accepted the occupation of land by peasants, provoking indignation among the "bourgeois" members of the government, while the opening of negotiations with the Kiev Rada displeased Russian nationalists who feared secession from Ukraine. Georgi Lvov resigned on July 15, replaced as head of government by Kerensky. On July 17, the Petrograd garrison and the sailors of the Kronstadt fleet, fearing to be sent to the front, join the striking workers of the Putilov factories and rise up against the Provisional Government: they surround the Duma but, lacking Lenin's instructions, fail to seize power. Pavel Pereverzev, Kerensky's successor at the Ministry of Justice, succeeded in turning public opinion against the Bolsheviks by portraying them as agents of Germany.

On July 18, following a stormy meeting at Mogilev, Kerensky demanded General Brusilov's resignation and entrusted command-in-chief to Lavr Kornilov. Kornilov asked Kerensky to establish a dictatorial regime, proclaim martial law, reinstate the death penalty in the rear, ban strikes and dissolve the Petrograd Soviet. In counter-revolutionary circles, the idea spread of a military dictatorship to put an end to Bolshevik agitation, but Kerensky was not ready to break with the soviets.

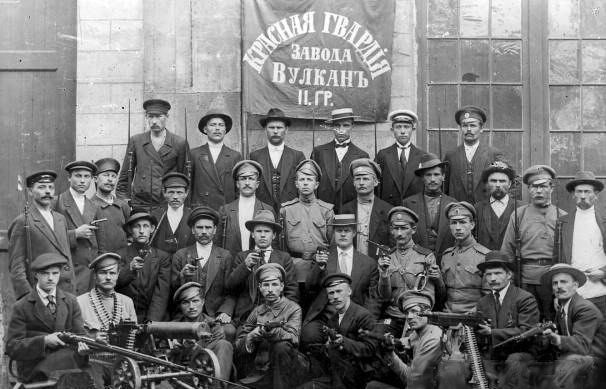
Red Guards occupying the Vulkan factory in Petrograd, October 1917.

On August 11, Kornilov ordered General Alexander Krymov's 3rd Cavalry Corps, including the Caucasian Tribal Division, to be ready to occupy Petrograd to restore order in the event of a Bolshevik coup. On August 27, following a series of misunderstandings, Kornilov became convinced that Kerensky's government had fallen to the Bolsheviks and ordered the 3rd Corps to march on Petrograd. Kerensky proclaimed himself commander-in-chief, while the Petrograd Soviet, with the participation of the Bolsheviks, organized the defense of the city and the blockade of the railroads. Emissaries from the Workers' Soviets, the Petrograd garrison and the Union of Muslim Soviets, which was meeting in the city at the time, spoke to the soldiers and convinced them to remain loyal to the Provisional Government. The Kornilov affair ended with his arrest and Krymov's suicide.

The Kornilov affair left deep rifts in the army and society. Mutinous soldiers arrested and sometimes shot dead several hundred officers suspected of being "Kornilovists". Kerensky was abandoned both by the Right, which supported the convicted generals, and by the Left, which had lost all confidence in him. He exercised a "dictatorship" with virtually no authority. 40,000 Kronstadt sailors and workers, armed to face the putsch, probably kept their weapons and formed the basis of the Bolshevik Red Guards.

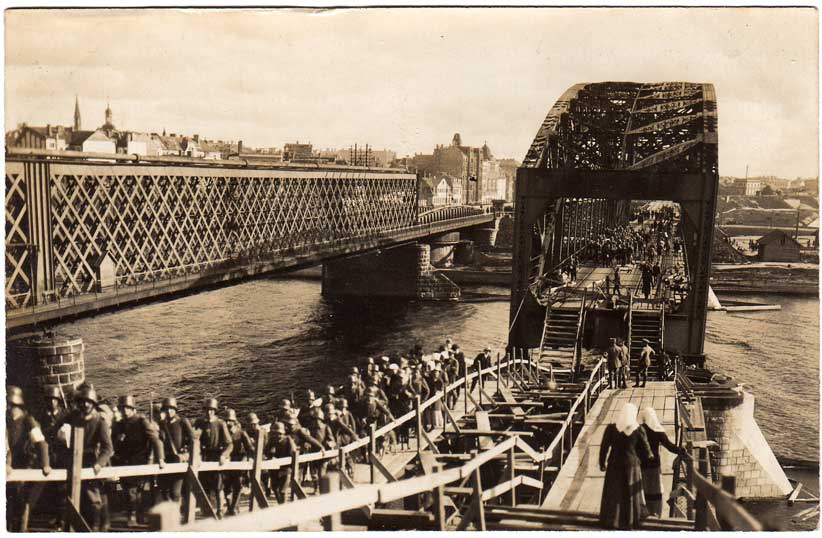
German troops crossing a destroyed bridge in Riga, September 1917.

The capture of Riga by the Germans (September 1–5, 1917), the last major operation on the front, added to the discredit of the provisional government. The German 8th Army attacked with superior technical resources, including poison gas, flamethrowers and aerial bombardments. After several days of fighting, the Russian 12th Army withdrew in disorder north of the Daugava, abandoning its artillery for lack of fodder for its draught horses, while the XLIII Corps, and in particular the Latvian Riflemen, sacrificed themselves to cover the army's retreat.

The disintegration of the Empire continued. From September 21 to 28, a Congress of the Peoples of the Empire, held in Kiev on the initiative of the Central Rada, brought together representatives of 10 nationalities calling for the transformation of the Empire into a federation of free peoples. The delegates elected a People's Council to the Provisional Government.

Kerensky had lost all credibility, even with the Allies, who believed he was about to sign a separate peace agreement. On November 2, five days before the fall of the Provisional Government, General Alexander Verkhovsky, Minister of War, declared that the army was no longer fit to fight. Kerensky himself later admitted that the only way to avoid the Bolsheviks taking power would have been to sign peace with Germany immediately: "We were too naive".

=== The Bolsheviks in power and the end of the war ===
Lenin, living underground in Petrograd after a brief exile in Finland, was determined to take advantage of the Provisional Government's weakness: he persuaded his comrades, Zinoviev, Kamenev and Trotsky, that power had to be seized by a coup de force before the Second All-Russian Congress of Workers' and Soldiers' Soviets, scheduled for early November, and the election of the Constituent Assembly in the same month, which would create a new legal order. Trotsky was appointed head of the Petrograd Military Revolutionary Committee, comprising some 40 regiments, 200 factories and 15 district committees, totalling 20,000 or 30,000 men. Once again, it was the threat of being sent to the front that triggered the soldiers' revolt. The Military Revolutionary Committee, posing as an emanation of the Petrograd Soviet, took the lead. Between October 21/November October 3 and 26/November 8, the Bolsheviks took control of the garrisons and the Petrograd Soviet. The Winter Palace, the last refuge of the Provisional Government, defended by a few cadets and women soldiers, surrendered after a few hours: the fighting seemed to involve only a small number of people, while restaurants, theaters and streetcars operated as usual. The All-Russian Congress of Soviets, which held its first session on November 8, had just enough time to endorse the first two decrees dictated by Lenin: the Decree on Land, which recognized peasant ownership of land, and the Decree on Peace, which "calls on all peoples and governments to open negotiations for a just democratic peace without delay".

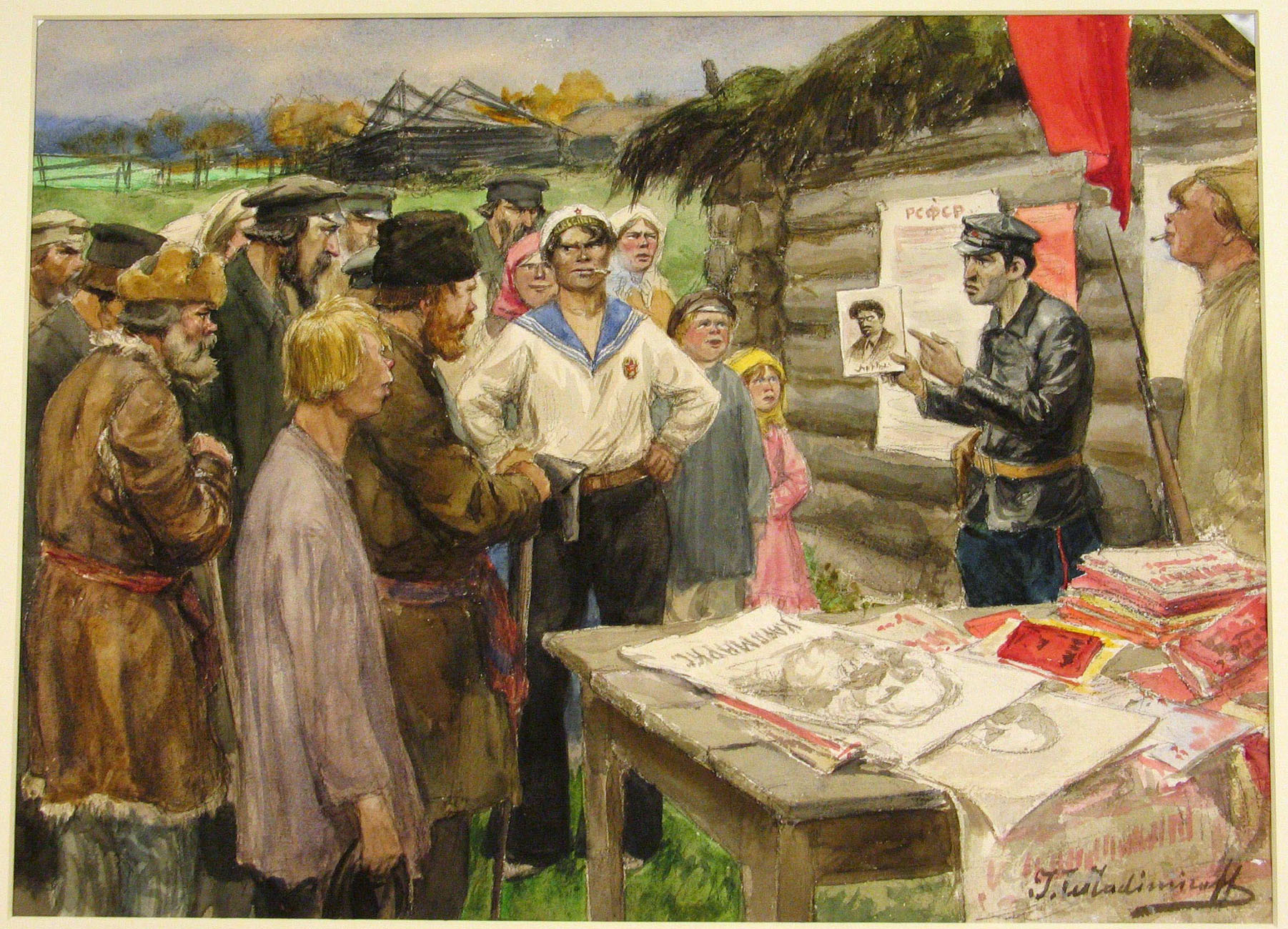
The Agitator, painting by Ivan Vladimirov, n.d. A Bolshevik political commissar, escorted by a sailor and a soldier, explains revolutionary ideology to peasants.

The new government was far from having a majority in the country. General Vladimir Cheremissov, commander of the Northern Front, refused to commit his troops to a political struggle. Only General Pyotr Krasnov agreed to march on Petrograd with a few thousand Cossacks of the Imperial Guard; they were repulsed in the Pulkovo hills by Latvian sailors and riflemen aligned with the Bolshevik camp. In Moscow, several days of street fighting pitted Bolshevik supporters and opponents against each other. In Kiev, a short triangular battle pitted the supporters of the Provisional Government, grouped around the military region's headquarters, against those of the Bolsheviks and those of the Central Rada: in the end, the latter held sway, enabling the Rada, on November 20, 1917, to proclaim the Ukrainian People's Republic "without severing federal ties with Russia". The Saratov government, which had been in revolt against Kerensky for several weeks, was overthrown by the Bolsheviks on November 10. Elsewhere, the Bolsheviks won the support of the large garrisons of Reval, Pskov, Minsk and Gomel, but in November they had a majority only in the 5th Army Committee. The other left-wing parties, the Socialist-Revolutionaries and Mensheviks, were slow to react, counting on the elections to the Constituent Assembly to restore democracy without bloodshed. The vote gave a relative majority to the SR with 40.4% of the civilian vote and 40.7% of the military vote, while the Mensheviks obtained only 2.9% of the civilian vote and 3.2% of the military vote.

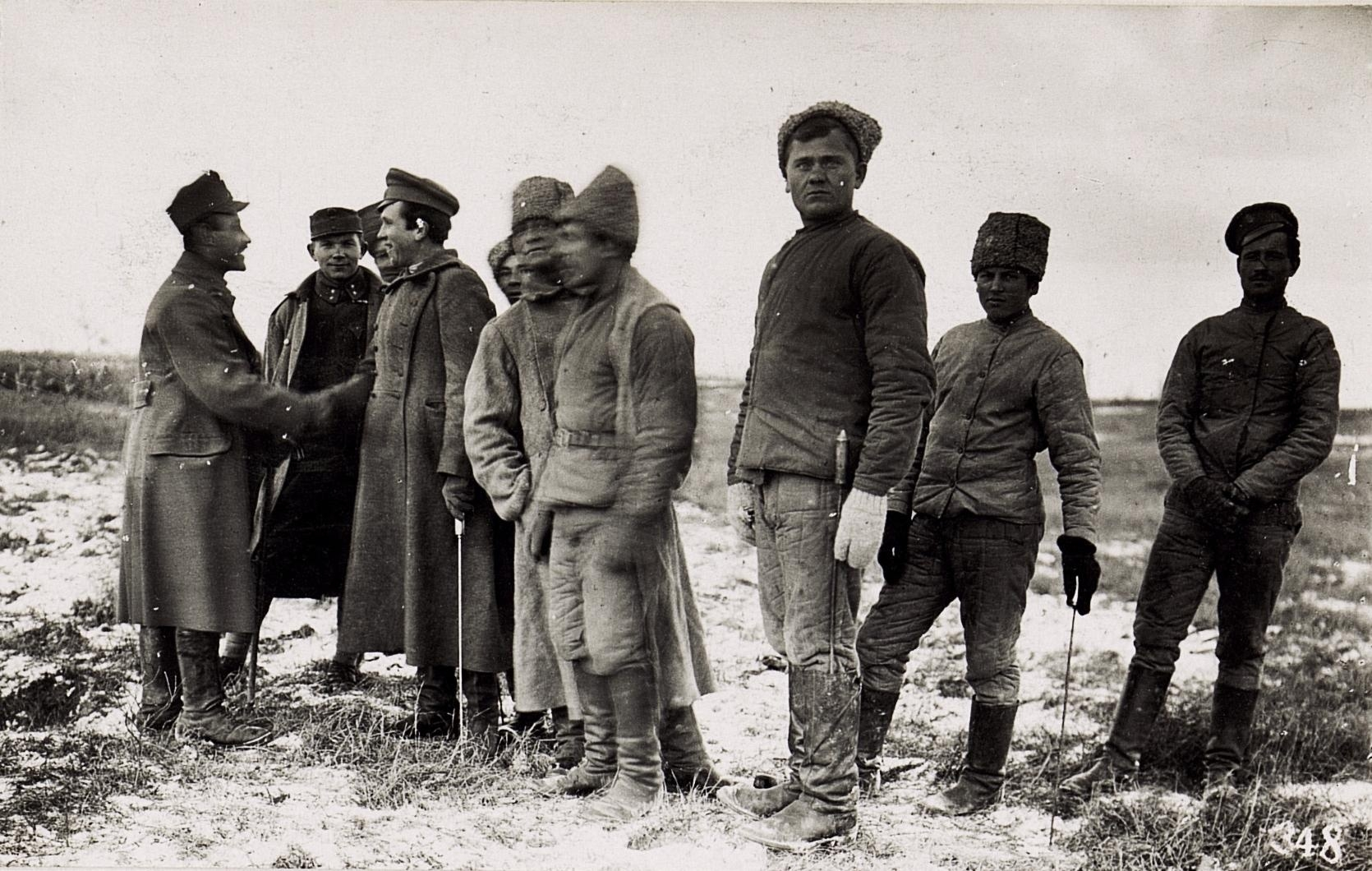
Armistice between Russians and Austro-Hungarians, v. December 9, 1917.

The Bolsheviks knew they were incapable of sustaining a war against the great powers: they sought to gain time, counting on the imminence of a general revolution in Europe. On November 26, Trotsky, appointed Commissar for Foreign Affairs, asked to open peace talks with the German command. Lieutenant Nikolai Krylenko, appointed Commissar for War, is sent to lead the Stavka in Mogilev: on his arrival, the soldiers have just lynched his predecessor, General Nikolai Dukhonin, accused of having helped Kornilov escape. Krylenko's main task was to distribute propaganda in German, Hungarian, Czech and Romanian to the troops of the Central Empires. The Germans, anxious to conclude the war so that they could transfer their troops to the Western Front, finally forced the signing of the armistice on December 15, 1917.

At the same time, the Bolshevik government attempted to extend its power to Ukraine. Elections to the Constituent Assembly on December 10–12, 1917 gave a majority to the independentists; on December 12, an attempted Bolshevik insurrection was suppressed and its supporters expelled from Kiev. On December 17, Trotsky issued an ultimatum to the Ukrainian Republic of Kiev, ordering it to allow the Red Guards free passage through its territory and to ban the Don Cossacks who left the front to return to their homeland. On December 25, 1917, with the support of non-Ukrainian minorities, the Bolsheviks founded the Ukrainian Soviet Republic in Kharkiv. In January, they sent an army commanded by Vladimir Antonov-Ovseïenko, who crushed Ukrainian volunteers at the Battle of Kruty and took Kiev. The Central Rada took refuge in Zhytomyr and appealed to the Germans for help, with whom it signed the first Treaty of Brest-Litovsk on February 9, 1918.

The army's situation was extremely confused. On the Romanian front, at the beginning of January 1918, a report by French general Henri Berthelot indicated that some Russian units were rallying to the Bolsheviks, others to the independence government of the Central Rada, but most were looking for food and a way home. 4 infantry divisions, mainly made up of Ukrainians, are leaving the front to return to Ukraine. Several divisions have been reduced to one or two regiments, with "almost no fighting spirit".

The Russian Constituent Assembly, barely assembled, was dispersed at its first session on January 18–19, 1918. On February 10, the Bolshevik government decreed the demobilization of the army. On the same day, Trotsky, the Soviets' envoy to Brest-Litovsk, announced that Russia was withdrawing from the conflict without signing the peace treaty. The Germans, who had just signed a treaty of understanding with Ukraine, retaliated by denouncing the armistice with the Russians and, on February 18, 1918, launched Operation Faustschlag: 50 German divisions entered Russian territory and advanced 240 km with virtually no resistance. Fearing that they would advance as far as Petrograd and overthrow the Bolshevik regime, Lenin accepted the German demands and, on March 3, signed the second Treaty of Brest-Litovsk.

== Consequences ==
=== In the ruins of the Empire ===
Under the Treaty of Brest-Litovsk, Russia relinquished Ukraine, Finland and the Baltic states, which had become formally independent under German trusteeship; it lost 26% of its population, 40% of its industrial workforce, 32% of its agricultural land, 23% of its industrial production and 75% of its coal mines; it had to pay Germany 6 billion marks to settle its pre-war debts, surrender its naval bases in Finland and the Baltic states, as well as its Black Sea fleet, and return to the Ottoman Empire the provinces of Kars and Batumi taken in 1878. The Democratic Republic of Georgia proclaimed its independence on May 26, while the British occupied Baku.

The Germans and Austro-Hungarians occupied Ukraine until autumn 1918. They set up a vassal regime, the hetmanate, led by General Pavlo Skoropadsky and supported by large landowners. The occupiers confiscated grain harvests for the benefit of the urban populations of Germany and Austria-Hungary, but soon came up against peasant guerrilla warfare. In the autumn of 1918, seeing the German defeat approaching, Skoropadsky tried to draw closer to the Entente and the White Russians by promising to re-establish a federal union between Russia and Ukraine, but he was overthrown by the left-wing Ukrainian nationalists who retook Kiev. The German occupying troops gave up the hetmanate: in exchange, the new Ukrainian government allowed them to return home without hindrance. Non-demobilized German soldiers remained in the Baltic states, forming the Baltic Corps Francs, which fought the Bolsheviks until 1919.

The Allies were not resigned to Russia's withdrawal from the war. A Conference of Ambassadors, formed in Paris by former Tsar ministers, tried to form a semblance of a government in exile. 2,000 British soldiers landed at Arkhangelsk and, without fighting the Bolsheviks, encouraged counter-revolutionary activities. General Józef Haller's Polish Legion, evacuated from Murmansk, went to fight on the French front. The Allies also sought to evacuate the Czechoslovak Legion via the Trans-Siberian Railway, but in May 1918 at Chelyabinsk, the Bolsheviks clumsily attempted to arrest and disarm the Legionaries, prompting them to join the White Army in the Russian Civil War. Allied intervention during the Russian Civil War, marked by the landing of contingents in Odessa and Vladivostok, was initially aimed at overthrowing the Bolshevik regime, considered to be pro-German, but continued long after the armistice of 1918.

The "Reds" (Bolsheviks) managed to survive and triumph over their adversaries by establishing a centralized, authoritarian regime -war communism- which nationalized enterprises, strictly controlled trade and led expeditions into the countryside to confiscate crops. The regime created a "Workers' and Peasants' Red Army", reintroduced conscription and, despite ideological divisions, took on officers from the imperial army motivated by Russian patriotism. The political police (Cheka) established mass terror. The cities depopulated, emptied of their persecuted former elites, but also of a large proportion of their workers, who returned to the villages to seek their livelihood. One of the Reds' strengths was that they held the main armaments factories, notably those in Tula, and the most populous regions of central Russia, where they were able to mobilize numbers far superior to those of their opponents.

The last peasant revolt against the Bolsheviks, in the Tambov government, was crushed in June 1921. Russia emerged bloodless from 7 years of international and civil war. The currency was devalued, cities were reduced to starvation, 7,000 km of railroads were destroyed, and the black market based on barter replaced legal trade. A former soldier turned Bolshevik cadre, Dimitri Oskine, describes the usual appearance of Russian cities:

The stations were dead, trains rarely passed, at night there was no lighting, just a candle at the telegraph office. The buildings were half-destroyed, the windows shattered, everything was filthy; everywhere garbage piled up.

=== A long forgotten memory ===
Unlike other belligerents, Russia has long neglected the memory of the Great War. After 1918, most of the cemeteries at the front were located outside Soviet territory, making them inaccessible to the families of those killed: from 1919, for example, the German War Graves Commission took charge of maintaining the German and Russian graves in the Baranavitchy region. Under the Soviet regime, official historiography did not seek to glorify the conflict – on the contrary. For the Précis of History of the Communist Party of the Soviet Union, published in 1938, "the imperialist war was provoked by the unequal development of the capitalist countries, the disruption of the balance between the main powers, and the need to proceed with a new division of the world by means of war": those who, like the Mensheviks and Socialist-Revolutionaries, agreed to take part in the war effort, only betrayed the interests of the Russian proletariat to the benefit of the Entente capitalists. The Czarist regime was denounced as a war monger; publications of soldiers' correspondence, which multiplied from 1927 onwards, served above all to show the suffering of the people at war and their growing discontent with the old regime. This theme is repeated in many early Soviet films: the sufferings and injustices of war, shown, for example, in the first ten minutes of Sergei Eisenstein's October (1927), appear as the necessary prelude to the Russian Revolution.

Conversely, historians of white Russian emigration, such as former Chief of Staff Yuri Danilov, were keen to portray Russia as the "heroic victim" who sacrificed himself for the Allied cause: they met with little response outside their own community.

The peoples detached from the Russian Empire also tend to exclude from their memory their contribution to its defense. Polish national memory glorifies the independence legions of Józef Piłsudski and Józef Haller, while ignoring the far more numerous soldiers who fought in the Russian, Austro-Hungarian and German armies. Similarly, Latvia celebrates Latvian Riflemen, omitting the many Latvians who served in the rest of the Russian army.

Perceptions of the First World War remained negative throughout the Soviet period, contrasting with the monumental civic cult surrounding the Great Patriotic War of 1941–1945. Aleksandr Solzhenitsyn spoke of "a war of no interest to us, but with disastrous consequences".

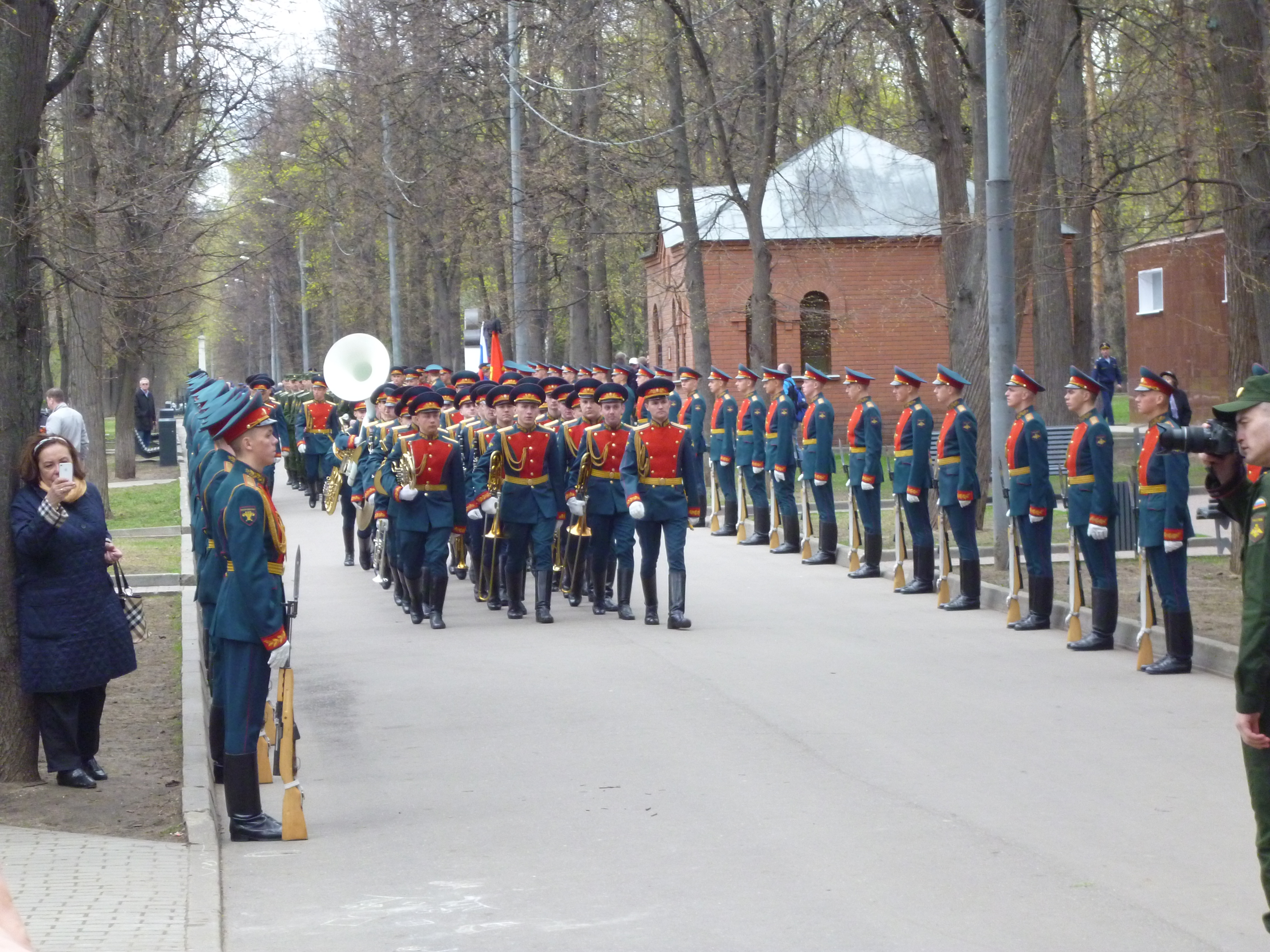
Reinhumation of Grand Duke Nicolas Nikolaïevitch, head of the Imperial Armies in 1914–1915, who died in France in 1929: his body was repatriated to Moscow in 2015.

It was only after the fall of the Soviet regime, with the massive rejection of the Soviet past, that a revaluation of the 1914–1917 war began, accompanied by a rehabilitation of Nicholas II. Between 2004 and 2014, the Tsarkoie Selo Imperial Park was transformed into a memorial complex for this war. The 2014 centenary was marked by a proliferation of exhibitions, with a strong involvement of memorial associations and the Orthodox Church. The two main exhibitions in Moscow are entitled "The First World War: The Last Battle of the Russian Empire", at the Moscow Historical Museum, and "The Entente", at the Tsaritsyno Palace. In contrast to the liberal discourse that dominated the 1990s, the 2014 centenary, under Vladimir Putin's government, tends to glorify a strong state with authoritarian and Russian nationalist connotations. Centenary speeches emphasize the greatness of the Russian Empire and the continuity of Russia, which repelled Napoleon in 1812, saved the Entente from disaster in 1914–1917 before triumphing over Nazism in 1945: the national affirmation is all the stronger for coinciding with the revolution in Ukraine, seen as a threat to Russia and the Slavic world, and the annexation of Crimea.

== Bibliography ==
- Figes, Orlando (2007). La Révolution russe. 1891–1924 : la tragédie d'un peuple [A People's Tragedy: Russian Revolution 1891–1924]. Translated by Dauzat, Pierre-Emmanuel. Éditions Denoël. ISBN 978-2-07-039886-7.
- Kennedy, Paul (1988). Naissance et déclin des grandes puissances [The Rise and Fall of the Great Powers]. Translated by Cochez, M.-A.; Lebrave, J.-L. Paris: Payot. p. 730. ISBN 2-228-88401-4.
- Sumpf, Alexandre (2014). La Grande guerre oubliée : Russie, 1914–1918. Paris: Éditions Perrin. p. 527. ISBN 978-2-262-04045-1.
- Mantran, Robert, ed. (1989). Histoire de l'Empire ottoman. Fayard. p. 814. ISBN 978-2-213-01956-7.
- Rauchensteiner, Manfried (2014). The First World War and the End of the Habsburg Monarchy, 1914–1918. Vienne: Böhlau Verlag Wien. ISBN 978-3-205-79588-9. Archived from the original on June 14, 2023.
- Boeckh, Katrin; Rutar, Sabine (2016). The Balkan Wars from Contemporary Perception to Historic Memory. Palgrave Macmillan. ISBN 978-3-319-44642-4.
- Churchill, Allen L.; Miller, Trevelyan (2014). "The Story of the Great War". Last Post Press. 6.
- Buttar, Pritt (2017). The Splintered Empires: The Eastern Front 1917–21. Osprey. ISBN 978-1-4728-1986-4.
- Motte, Martin (2004). "La seconde Iliade : blocus et contre-blocus au Moyen-Orient, 1914–1918". Guerres Mondiales et Conflits Contemporains. 214 (2): 39–53. doi:10.3917/gmcc.214.0039. ISSN 0984-2292.
- Gatrell, Peter (2014). Russia's First World War : A Social and Economic History. Routledge.
- Gatrell, Peter (207). "War, Refugeedom, Revolution: Understanding Russia's refugee crisis, 1914‑1918". Cahiers du monde russe. 58 (1–2): 123–146. doi:10.4000/monderusse.10073. ISSN 1252-6576.
- Stone, Norman (1976). The Eastern Front 1914–1917. Penguin.
- Tchouikina, Sofia (2016). "Le centenaire de la Première Guerre mondiale en Russie : les expositions historiques et leurs publics". Matériaux pour l'histoire de notre temps. 121–122 (121–122): 40–49. doi:10.3917/mate.121.0040.
- Haimson, Léopold; Brian, Éric (1995). "Les grèves ouvrières en Russie impériale pendant la Première Guerre mondiale et le déclenchement de la révolution de février 1917". Le Mouvement Social. 1 (169): 9–46. doi:10.3917/lms.1995.169.0009.
- Ferretti, Maria (2017). "La mémoire impossible". Cahiers du monde russe. 58 (58/1–2): 203–240. doi:10.4000/monderusse.10078.
- Ferro, Marc (1968). "Pourquoi Février ? Pourquoi Octobre ?". Annales. Economies, sociétés, civilisations. 23 (1): 31–48. doi:10.3406/ahess.1968.421884.
- Schramm, Tomasz (2007). Guerres mondiales et conflits contemporains. Vol. 228. pp. 61–70. doi:10.3917/gmcc.228.0061. ISSN 0984-2292.
- Joukovsky, Arkady (2005). Histoire de l'Ukraine : Des origines à nos jours. Dauphin. p. 324. ISBN 978-2716312943.
