= Tsarist Russia =

Russian state from 1547 to 1917

Tsarist Russia Царская Россия
- 1547–1917
- Flags: Left (1696–1917); Right (1858–1896)
- Motto: Съ Нами Богъ! "God is with us!"
- Anthem: Боже, Царя храни! ("God Save the Tsar!"; 1833–1917)
- Coat of arms Left (1667–1703); Right (1883–1917)

- Russia in 1500 Russia in 1600; Russia in 1700 Russia in 1778 Russia in 1914 Lost in 1856–1914; Spheres of influence Protectorates (Note: Principalities of Moldavia and Wallachia in 1829–1856.)
- Status: Imperial state
- Capital: Moscow (1547–1712; 1728–1732); Saint Petersburg (1721–1728; 1732–1917) (Note: Renamed Petrograd in 1914)
- Official languages: Russian
- Recognized languages: Polish; German; Finnish; Swedish
- Religion (1897): 88.2% Christianity; 71.3% Eastern Orthodox (official); 9.2% Catholic; 7.7% Other Christian; 7.1% Islam; 4.2% Judaism; 0.3% Buddhism; 0.2% Others
- Demonym: Russian
- Government: Unitary absolute monarchy (1547–1906) Unitary parliamentary semi-constitutional monarchy (1906–1917) Provisional government (1917)
- Tsar
  - 1547–1584: Ivan IV (first)
  - 1682–1721: Peter I (last)
- Emperor
  - 1721–1725: Peter I (first)
  - 1894–1917: Nicholas II (last)
- Chancellor/Prime Minister
  - 1810–1812 (first): Nikolai Rumyantsev (Note: As Chairman of the Committee of Ministers.)
  - 1917 (last): Alexander Kerensky
- Legislature: Boyar Duma (1547–1549; 1684–1711); Zemsky Sobor (1549–1684); Governing Senate (1721–1917)
  - Upper house: State Council (1810–1917)
  - Lower house: State Duma (1905–1917)
- History
  - Annexation of the Novgorodian Republic: January 14, 1478
  - Proclamation of the Tsardom of Russia: January 16, 1547
  - Livonian War: 1558–1583
  - Time of Troubles: 1598–1613
  - Polish–Russian War: 1654–1667
  - Great Northern War: 1700–1721
  - Proclamation of the Russian Empire: November 2, 1721
  - French invasion of Russia: 1812
  - Crimean War: 1853–1856
  - Emancipation of the serfs: March 3, 1861
  - First Revolution: 1905–1907
  - February Revolution: March 1917
  - Republic proclaimed: September 14, 1917

Area
  - Total: 22,800,000 km^{2} (8,800,000 sq mi)
- 1584: 5,100,000 km^{2} (2,000,000 sq mi)
- 1650: 9,700,000 km^{2} (3,700,000 sq mi)
- 1725: 15,000,000 km^{2} (5,800,000 sq mi)
- 1895: 22,800,000 km^{2} (8,800,000 sq mi)

Population
  - 1897: 125,640,021
- Currency: Russian ruble
Preceded by	Succeeded by
Grand Principality of Moscow	Russian Republic

Tsarist Russia (Note: Russian: Царская Россия, romanized: Tsarskaya Rossiya) was a transcontinental imperial state that existed in Eurasia from 1547 to 1917, encompassing the latter stages of the Russian monarchy. It evolved from the Grand Principality of Moscow, or Muscovy, in the 16th century; its latter years from around 1478 onwards are sometimes included as part of Tsarist Russia. Under it, Russia expanded to become the largest contemporary contiguous country and one of the largest empires in all of history, and it was a major player in international politics during its existence. The history of Tsarist Russia is divided between the Tsardom of Russia, when the Russian monarch used the title of Tsar, and the Russian Empire, when they used the title of Emperor; collectively in colloquial and historiographic discourse, the monarchs of this period are often simply referred to as Tsars.

The East Slavs had coalesced into the Kyivan Rus by the 10th century; however, in the 12th century, the area had collapsed into various de facto independent polities. Following the Mongol subjugation of the area in the 13th century, what would become Russia would be under the so-called "Tatar Yoke," or overlordship by the descendants of the Mongols. In the 15th century, Muscovy was able to become the predominant native Russian force in the area, and were able to throw off their Tatar overlords under Ivan III. As the Sovereign of all Russia, Ivan began to use intermittently use the title tsar, the rough Slavic equivalent to the title emperor, in 1484, partially to derive legitimacy from the Byzantine Empire, which had fallen only a few decades earlier. Though used in foreign correspondence, no Muscovite monarch would be crowned tsar until 1547, when Ivan III's grandson, Ivan IV, crowned himself Tsar of all Russia, forming the Tsardom of Russia.

Starting in the 16th century, Russia began a large expansion of its borders, primarily eastwards into Siberia. Between 1550 and 1700, Russia grew on average 35,000 square kilometres (14,000 sq mi) annually. Ivan IV, better known as Ivan the Terrible, would go on to layout many of the foundations of the imperial state, though afterwards, Russia collapsed into an era of instability that ended in the Rurikid Dynasty being replaced by the House of Romanov. During this era, Russia was in frequent conflict with Poland-Lithuania and Sweden, and was somewhat backwards compared to the rest of Europe, but this began to change at the dawn of the 18th century under Peter the Great, who modernized the country, won the Great Northern War against Sweden, and moved the capital to an ex-Swedish fort on the Neva River, forming the city of Saint Petersburg (renamed Petrograd in the state's final years). Under him, as part of his westernization process, he replaced the title Tsar with the title imperator, closer etymologically to the English emperor and similar terms in other Western European languages, thus forming the Russian Empire. Afterwards, the country emerged as one of the great powers of Europe. It participated in most great power conflicts during the 18th and 19th centuries, including the Napoleonic Wars where it played a major role in France's defeat via repelling its attempted invasion of the country in 1812. During this era, it also advanced into Central Asia, parts of China, the former Poland-Lithuania, the Caucasus, and briefly the New World.

Until the 18th century, the boyars, or highest-ranking Russian nobility dominated the country's political system. In part due to the influence from the Mongol invasions and subsequent rule, the state became heavily stratified between classes, with a high, downtrodden serf population. Most directly from Ivan the Terrible and Peter the Great, the latter of whom destroyed the power base of the boyars, the state took a very autocratic direction, with power concentrated into the Tsar. In the mid-19th century, in part due to the Russian defeat in the Crimean War against Britain and France, as well as the Industrial Revolution, the state began to undergo a series of reforms in its last six decades, including the emancipation of the serfs and increasing industrialization. However, antagonism towards the Tsarist model began to ratchet up in the late 19th century, especially with the ascendency of Nicholas II to the throne. His reign saw Japan defeat Russia in a surprise upset war in 1905, which then precipitated a revolution that resulted in a formal, somewhat democratic legislature being adopted. During World War I, Russia proved largely unable to effectively manage its war effort against the German-led Central Powers, and compounded with simmering tensions over the 1905 revolution, as well as the poor quality of life during the conflict, led to Nicholas II being ousted in a revolution in February; subsequentially, a republic was declared. Disunity between the participants of the February Revolution would lead to the later October Revolution that triggered a civil war, ending with the establishment of the Soviet Union.

== Terminology and definition ==
Monomakh's Cap, the crown used during the Tsardom of Russia

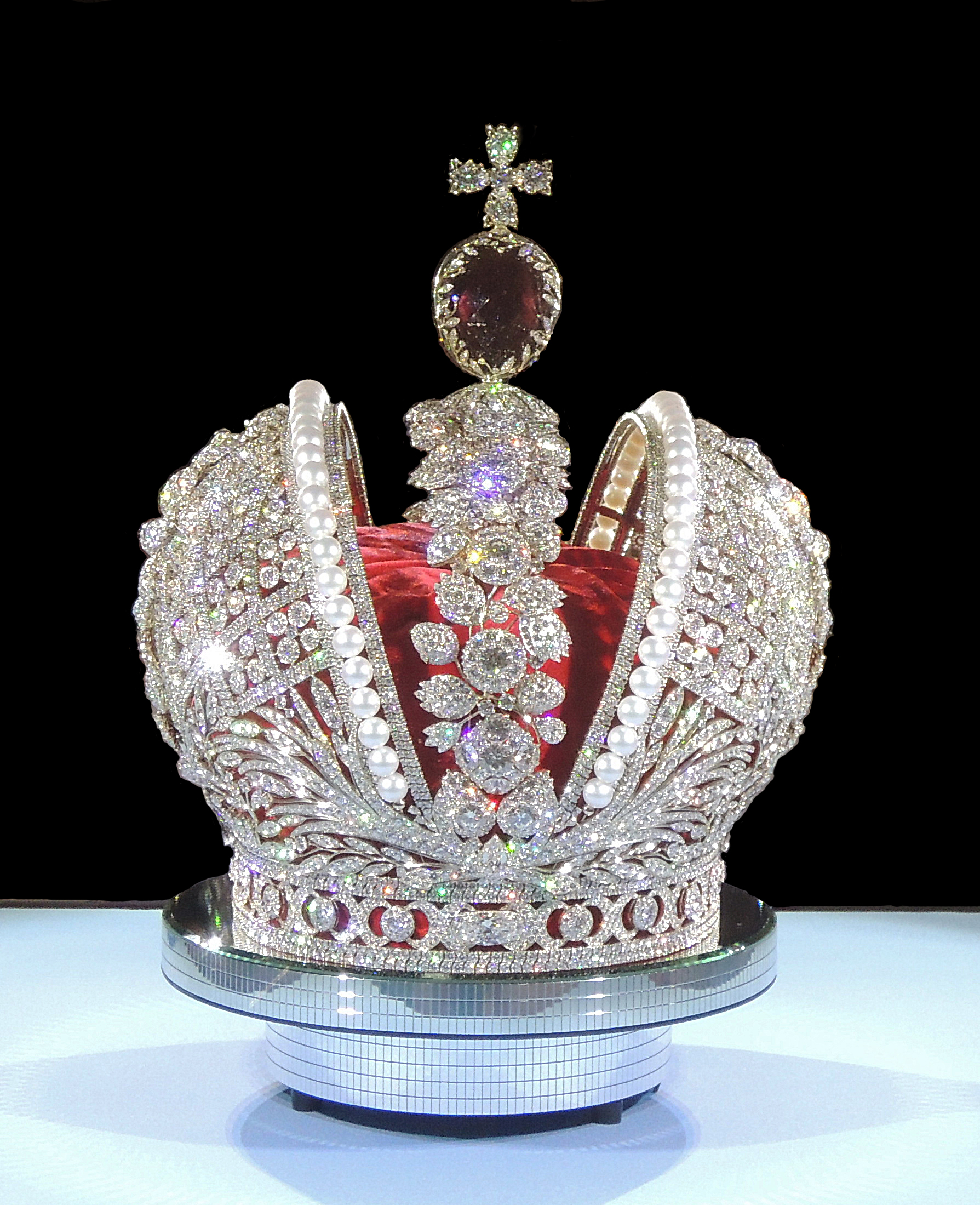
Replica of the Imperial crown of Russia, used for most of the period of the Russian Empire

Colloquially, Tsarist Russia typically refers to the period between 1547 and 1917, when Russia was headed by a monarch crowned with an imperial title. This began with Ivan the Terrible, who formally crowned himself as such in the former year. Ivan the Terrible used the title tsar, which was a Slavicized corruption of the word caesar, which is also the origin of the words used as the imperial title in languages such as German (Kaiser). The word caesar was derived from the Roman Empire, which provided post-antiquity Europeans with their understanding of what imperial titles and symbolism meant. Coming from Julius Caesar, who was considered in Roman times as being the first emperor, it was one of a myriad of titles used by the Roman emperors. However, since the Roman Empire was not a formal monarchy and in practice more akin to a military dictatorship, there was never a formal title, and other ones such as princeps or imperator were also used. The latter term became the dominant evolved into being the common form in the Latin-derived Romance languages, such as Spanish and Catalan (emperador), Portuguese (imperador), Romanian (împărat), Italian (imperatore), Occitan (emperaire), and French (empereur). Germanic languages such as the aforementioned German tended to use variants derived from caesar, such as Swedish (kejsare), Danish (kejser), Norwegian (keiser), Dutch (keizer), or Luxembourgish (kesser). Old English used the term cāser, which evolved into Middle English as kayser. After England was invaded by the Normans, the English language underwent a process of gallicization, with the Normans bringing their French-influenced language to Britain. Through the dialect of the new Norman nobility, the French-derived emperor eventually became predominant.

Throughout the Middle Ages, it was generally understood that there was one, universal empire in Christendom, the rightful inheritors of the ancient Roman imperial legacy. As the western and eastern churches began to split, this became the Holy Roman Empire in the west and the Byzantine Empire in the east. When the Byzantine Empire fell in 1453, the title of emperor in the east became vacant. As the Ottoman Empire began gobbling up the South Slavic and Byzantine rump states in the Balkans and Anatolia, Russia became in essence the only major part of Eastern Orthodoxy not under effective foreign domination; as such, many began clamoring for the Grand Principality of Moscow, or Muscovy, which had emerged as the dominant force in Russia, to become the successor to Rome. Grand Prince Ivan III, who would later formally throw off the Tatar Yoke, married Sophia Palaiologina, the niece of the last Byzantine emperor, Constantine XI, through his brother Thomas, the despot of the since-conquered Byzantine rump state of Morea, in 1472. In 1484, he began using the title tsar in foreign correspondence, which was accompanied by increased usage of Byzantine imagery. For this reason, as well as the foundations of future tsarist autocracy under Ivan III, some date the start of Tsarist Russia to Ivan III's reign. Ivan's grandson, Ivan the Terrible, would be the first to be crowned Tsar of all Russia in 1547, with the documents of the coronation referring to his domain as the Tsardom of Russia; this is typically interpreted as the start of Tsarist Russia.

In the late 17th century, Peter the Great came to power in Russia. Peter was influenced and fascinated by Western Europe, and he sought to orient Russia towards the setting sun. His reign was marked by a series of westernization reforms that integrated Russia further into Europe. This included many stylistic changes, such as forcing Russian nobles to shave their beards to fit into contemporary Western fashion. As part of this, in 1721, Peter dropped the Slavic tsar, and replaced it with the word imperator, becoming the Imperator (Emperor) of Russia, forming the Russian Empire. In addition to wanting to appear more western, this was done to help facilitate the long running Russian attempt to have their imperial status legitimized by the west, including most notably from the Habsburg-run Holy Roman Empire. Although the Habsburgs had somewhat accepted the title tsar, they did it on the pretense that a tsar was of lower rank than an emperor. Although several European states immediately recognized the new title, the Austrian Habsburgs would not recognize this until 1742, in exchange for Russian neutrality (and eventually support) during the Austrian War of Succession. Despite the name change, in colloquial discourse, the term Tsar remained in use, even domestically, with Emperor largely only being used in formal diplomatic and governmental language; this has persisted until the present.

== History ==
=== Background (9th century to 1480) ===
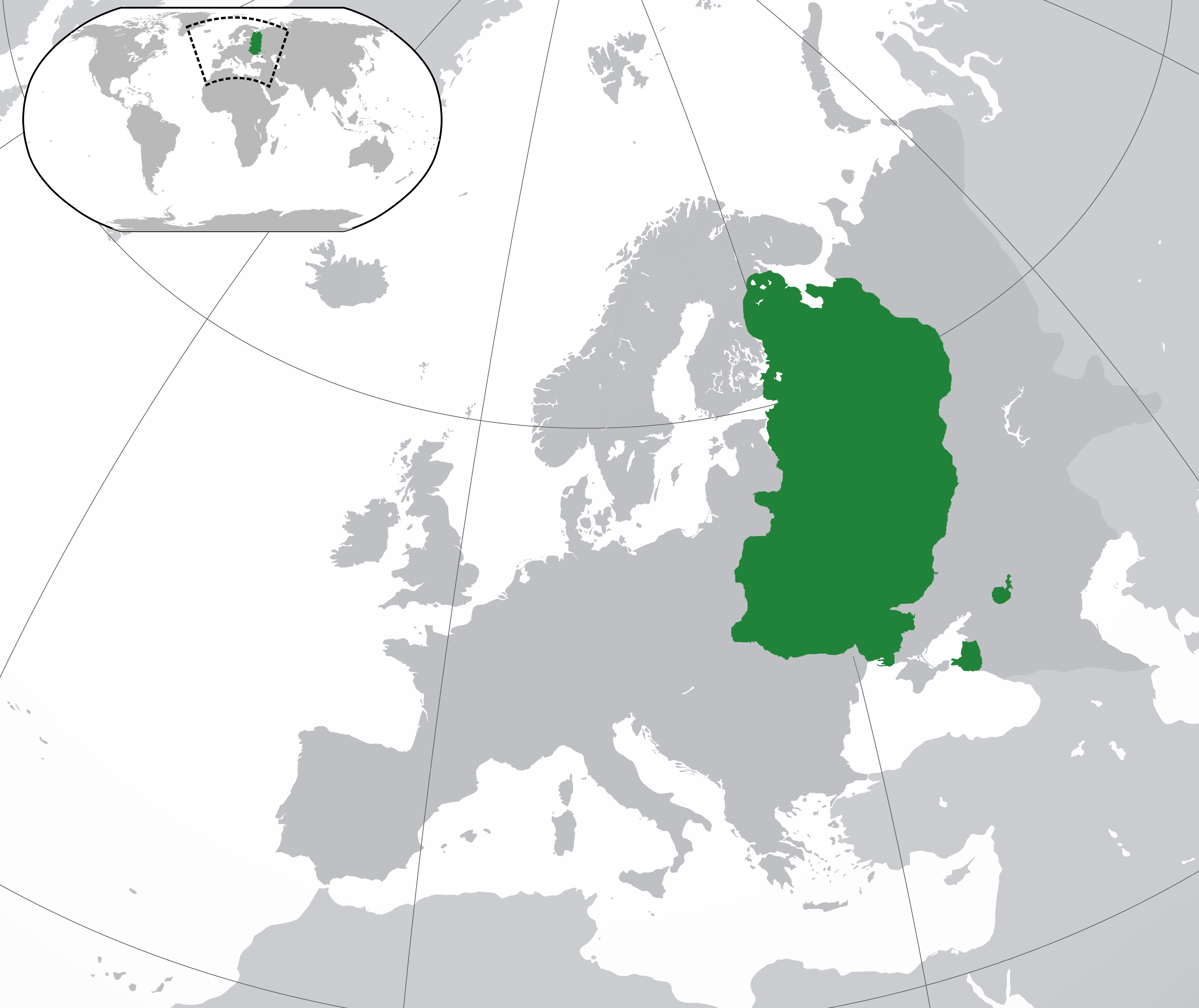
The Kyivan Rus in 1054.

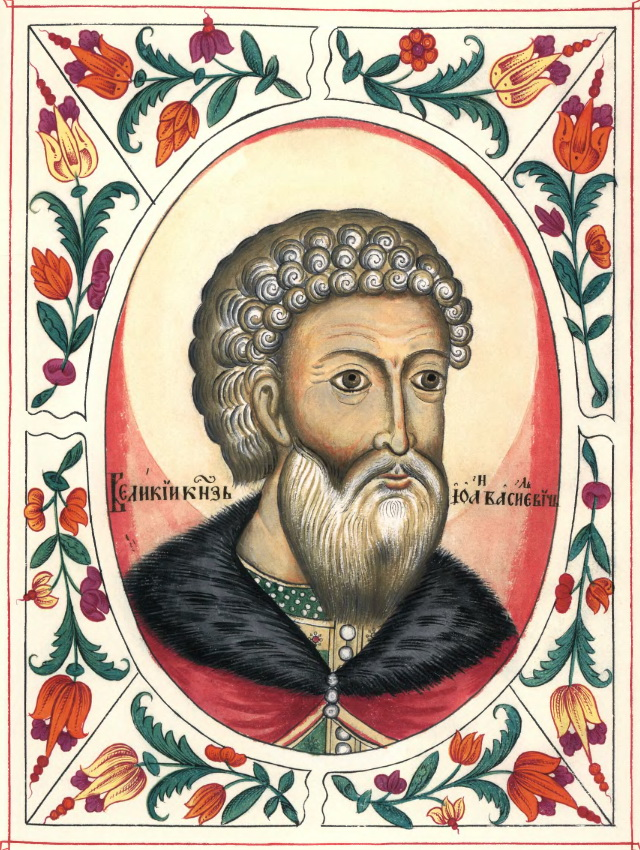
Ivan III, as depicted in the Tsarsky titulyarnik.

At the time of the Roman Empire, the Slavs were inhabiting the woods of current day European Russia. As the Germanic tribes began migrating into the Western Roman Empire, a series of ethnic migrations began in the lands they vacated. The Slavs, being the largest ethnic group directly eastward of the Germanic peoples, largely filled this void, invading large parts of Eastern Europe. The ones that moved into these lands became the West and South Slavs. The ones that remained would become the East Slavs.

In 862, according to tradition, the Varangian chief Rurik was invited by the Novgorodians to become their ruler. Rurik brought his fellow Varangians to these lands, who became known as the Rus, and his successor Oleg then united the East Slavs into the Kievan Rus, which would be ruled by Rurik's descendants, the Rurikids. The Kievan Rus, stretching from the White to Black Seas at its peak in the 11th century under Yaroslav the Wise, was one of the preeminent polities of High Medieval Europe and a center of Eastern Orthodoxy, however, after Yaroslav's death, it entered into a period of disintegration that made it ripe for conquest by the Mongol Empire in the 13th century. The Mongol conquest initiated the era of the Tatar Yoke, while causing large scale disruptions and decline in cultural, economic, and political development. The Mongols integrated the East Slavs into their Golden Horde administrative division, which later became independent following the empire's partition in 1259, with the East Slavic principalities remaining as tributary states of the Mongols and their descendants, collectively referred to as Tatars.

Under Mongol rule, various principalities vied for supremacy over the East Slavs, with the Khan of the Golden Horde often playing kingmaker. During this era, the Poles and Lithuanians gradually annexed the western territories inhabited by the East Slavs; over time, the people living there would become the Belarusians and Ukrainians, while the remaining East Slavs became Russians. (Note: Save for the Rusyns who were under Hungarian control) Over time, the Princes of Moscow gradually emerged as the dominant Russian power, and began to consolidate control over the area as the Golden Horde went into decline. Under successive monarchs, the Grand Principality of Moscow began to assert itself more on the European stage. It accumulated more territory in Russia, while also declaring the Russian Church to be autocephalous from Constantinople in 1448 following the wildly unpopular Florentine Council. Vasily II, who reigned from 1425 to 1462, was the first Muscovite ruler to adopt the title of "Sovereign of all Russia".

Vasilly II was succeeded by his son Ivan III. Ivan III, nicknamed the great, would become the so-called gatherer of the Russian lands, with Muscovy greatly expanding via conquest, purchase, and inheritance under his reign. In 1471 at the Battle of Shelon, he defeated the Novgorodian Republic, the last other major Russian polity, and it would be formally integrated into the Muscovite state in 1478.

=== Independence of Russia and the founding of the Tsardom ===
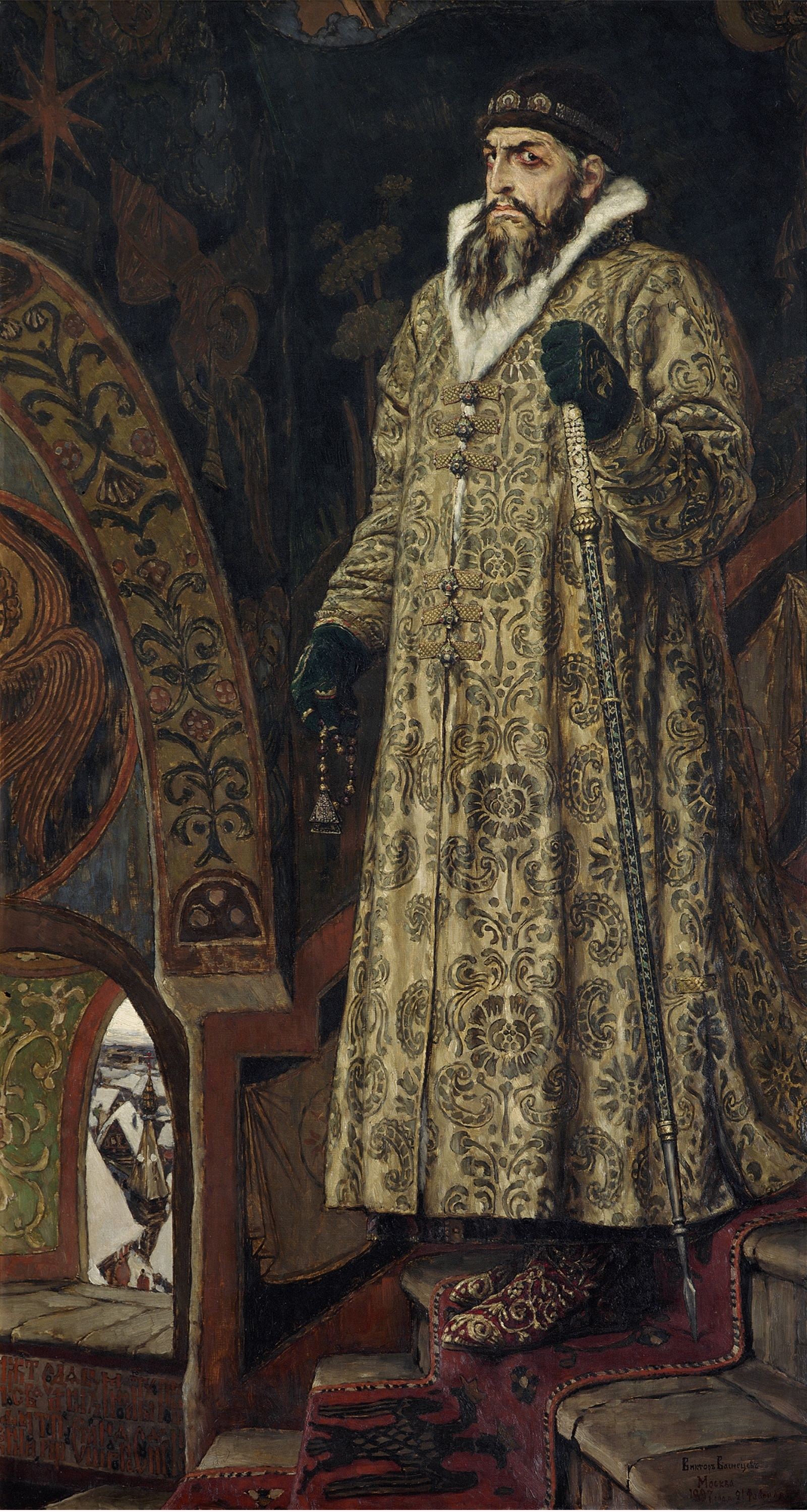
1897 portrait of Ivan the Terrible by Viktor Vasnetsov

Despite Muscovy increasingly asserting herself, the Golden Horde continued to force them to pay tribute via precipitous raids. In 1476, Ivan stopped paying tribute, prompting the Khan Ahmed to launch an invasion of Muscovy in 1480. The two men met with their armies at the banks of the Ugra River in the fall; after a month-long standoff, Ahmed withdrew, solidifying Russia's independence.

Ivan III began to use the term tsar in 1484, as his newly formed Russian state began to take on a new form. With the Byzantine Empire gone, and with Muscovy no longer under Tatar domination, many in the Eastern Orthodox world began to look at it as the new center of the faith and the successors of the Byzantines. Ivan III leaned into this, with the ideology of Third Rome becoming prominent and the foundations of an increasingly autocratic Russia being laid under his reign. Ivan III was succeeded by Vasily III, who in 1533 was succeeded by his three-year-old son Ivan IV.

On January 16, 1547, at the age of 16, Ivan IV Vasilyevich was crowned Tsar of all Russia at the Dormition Cathedral in the Kremlin. As established in the coronation document, as well as numerous other official texts, this formally established the Tsardom of Russia. While Ivan III and Vasily III had intermittently used the title tsar, often in foreign correspondence, Ivan IV would be the first Russian monarch to be crowned Tsar, and as such the first Russian monarch to be crowned with any imperial title. Ivan's early reign was marked by a series of modernizing reforms, including a revised legal code in 1550, the establishment of the streltsy, or Russia's first standing army, and the Zemsky Sobor, a parliament of the feudal estates. He conquered Kazan in 1552, and continued his conquest of the regional Tatars via the conquest of the Astrakhan Khanate shortly afterwards; these conquests solidified Russian control of the Volga region. However, his fortunes changed in 1558, when he invaded Livonia in 1558. In what became the quarter of a century long Livonian War, Russia was defeated by a coalition of the Livonian Confederation, Poland and Lithuania, Sweden, Denmark–Norway, and the Ottoman tributary state of Transylvania.

The loss worsened Ivan's mental state and prompted him to announce his abdication. The boyars of Russia begged him to come back, which he did only on the condition of being granted absolute power. The remainder of his reign was dominated by widespread tyranny and disruption, with the Oprichniki, the first secret police in Russian history, wrecking much havoc on Russia during this era, including the destruction of Novgorod in 1570. Ivan's actions helped leave Russia in a politically, socially, and economically unstable state at the time of his death in 1584, which helped promulgate the Time of Troubles in the first years of the 17th century, where Russia was gripped by a succession crisis that triggered mass lawlessness, social crisis, and foreign invasion, including an occupation of Moscow by Poland-Lithuania.

The Time of Troubles ended in 1613 with the election of Michael I, ushering the era of the House of Romanov. The early Romanovs were weak rulers; despite this, tsarist autocracy managed to presist via the power of the Russian state bureaucracy, which expanded dramatically during this era. Serfs in this era became increasingly unfree, with a new legal code in 1649 further consolidating noble control of them. Many fled to the Wild Fields to escape their servitude, forming the Cossacks. Throughout this era, Russia continued to expand; between 1550 and 1700, Russia grew on average 35,000 square kilometres (14,000 sq mi) annually. Much of this came from the conquest of Siberia, as well as the annexation of territory from Poland-Lithuania in the Deluge, in which Russia began to usurp them as the preeminent Eastern European Power.

=== The Imperial Era ===
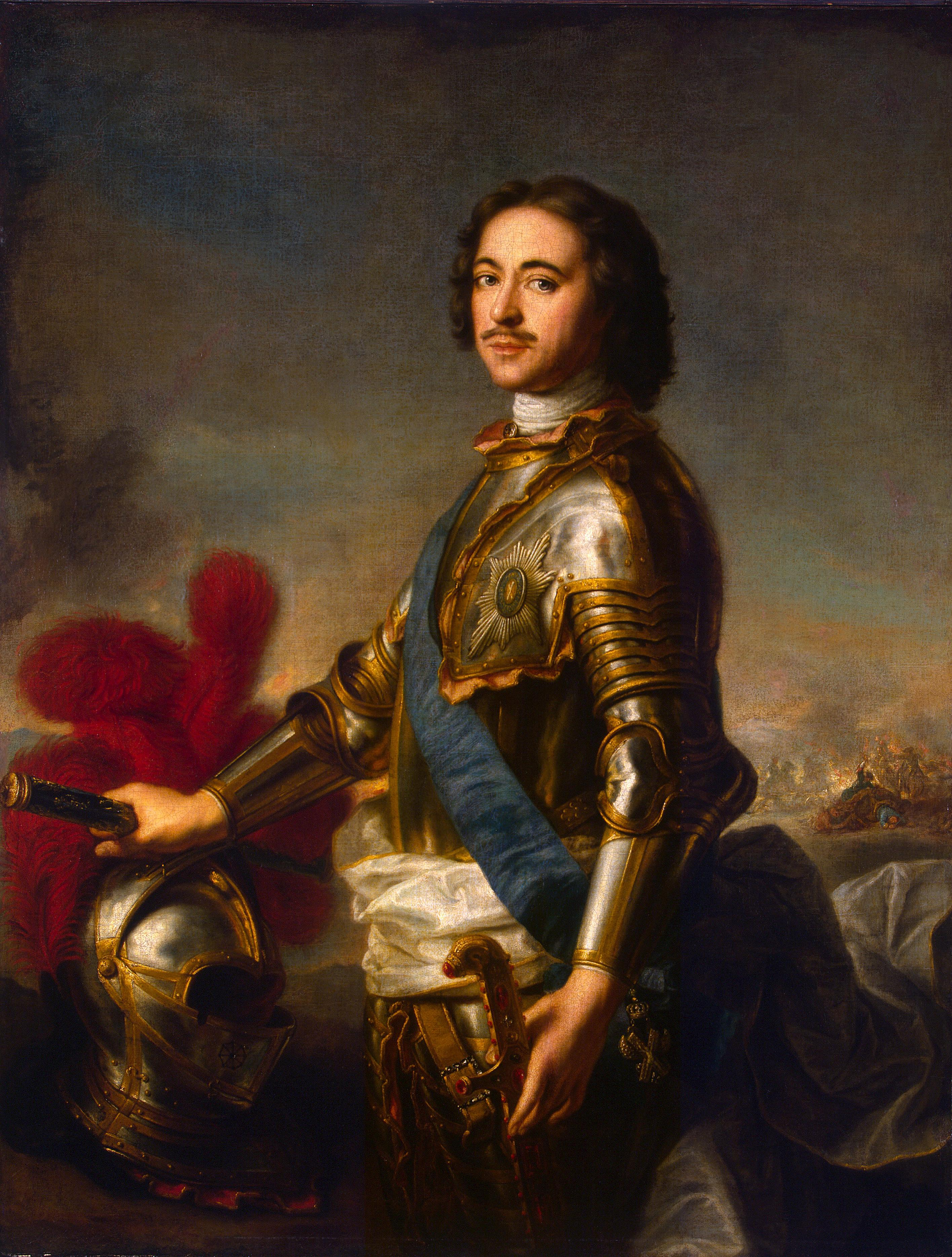
1717 portrait of Peter the Great by Jean-Marc Nattier

In 1682, Peter I came to power; but due to his youth, he did not actually govern until 1696. Peter had been exposed to Western Europe in his youth, and sought to use the power of tsarist autocracy to integrate Russia into the rest of Europe. His sweeping westernization efforts targeted the Russian military, economy government, and society at large. He ruled with an iron fist, organizing Russia into a police state, and brutally suppressing opposition, most notably the Bulavin Rebellion and Streltsy uprising.

In the Great Northern War, in which Russia formed a coalition with Poland-Lithuania and Denmark-Norway against the Swedish Empire, Peter was able to put his reform efforts to test. The Swedes, under their brilliant king Carolus Rex, proved to be a formidable force, and Russia suffered early defeats, most notably at Narva in 1700. The Russians were later able to take the Swedish fortress of Nyenschantz on the mouth of the Neva, where they founded Saint Petersburg—named after Peter's eponymous patron saint, Peter—on May 27, 1703. After several years of war, Carolus Rex was defeated by Russian forces at the Battle of Poltava on July 8, 1709; the defeat forced the Swedes to be on the defensive for the rest of the war and the country sued for peace after he was killed in battle in 1718. In the 1721 Treaty of Nystad, Sweden ceded large parts of Karelia, and all of Ingria, Estonia, and Livonia to Russia. This formalized the control of Saint Petersburg, which officially became the Russian capital in 1712.

Afterwards, to further symbolize Russia's westernization, Peter replaces the Slavic title Tsar, with the Latin Imperator, becoming what is translated into English as Emperor of Russia and establishing the Russian Empire on November 2, 1721. Dying in 1725, Peter had left a great mark on Russia, with it becoming a core part of the European geopolitical stage. The Russians involved themselves more in continental European politics, most notably the Seven Years' War. After the Peter III abruptly pulled Russia out of the war in 1762 when Russia was winning, the unpopular Tsar was deposed by the Russian nobility in 1763, with his wife Catherine the Great being installed. Under her reign, Russian continued to expand, with the PLC collapsing after a series of partitions by her and Prussia and Austria. Crimea and parts of the Caucasus were integrated, and she was known for her enlightened despotism. Tensions between the nobility and serfs continued however, with one of the largest peasants' revolts in history occurring during her reign. Russia became embroiled in the French Revolutionary and Napoleonic Wars alongside the rest of Europe, with Napoleon invading Russia and occupying Moscow in 1812, but he was forced to withdraw as the Russian winter set in, gradually leading to the collapse of the French Empire. As a result of the Congress of Vienna in 1815, Russian control over Finland and the lion's share of Poland was confirmed.

The 19th century saw increased division over the direction of Russian society as the country began to fall behind during the Industrial Revolution. There was a split between more liberal-minded, western-influenced individuals who chafed under the tsarist autocracy and so-called "Slavophiles" who opposed western influence and supported the current system. The first episode of this was the Decembrist revolt, in which a group of liberal army officers attempted to overthrow the government. The Tsars for their part continued to side with the Slavophiles early on, with Nicholas I promoting the ideology of Orthodoxy, Autocracy, and Nationality, and intervening against the revolutionaries during the Spring of Nations in 1848, but following Russia's defeat in the Crimean War, the need for reform became more obvious. His son and successor, Alexander II, would terminate the institution of serfdom in Russia, freeing 23 million people; but compromises with the Russian nobility over this limited the peasants' prosperity. Still, Russia began industrializing and economically developing, though not fast enough to prevent revolutionary and increasingly Marxist ideas from spreading across the empire. Alexander was assassinated by a nihilist-socialist terrorist organization called the Narodnaya Volya in 1881, and in response, his son and successor, Alexander III, rolled back much of his reforms.

=== End of Tsarist Russia ===
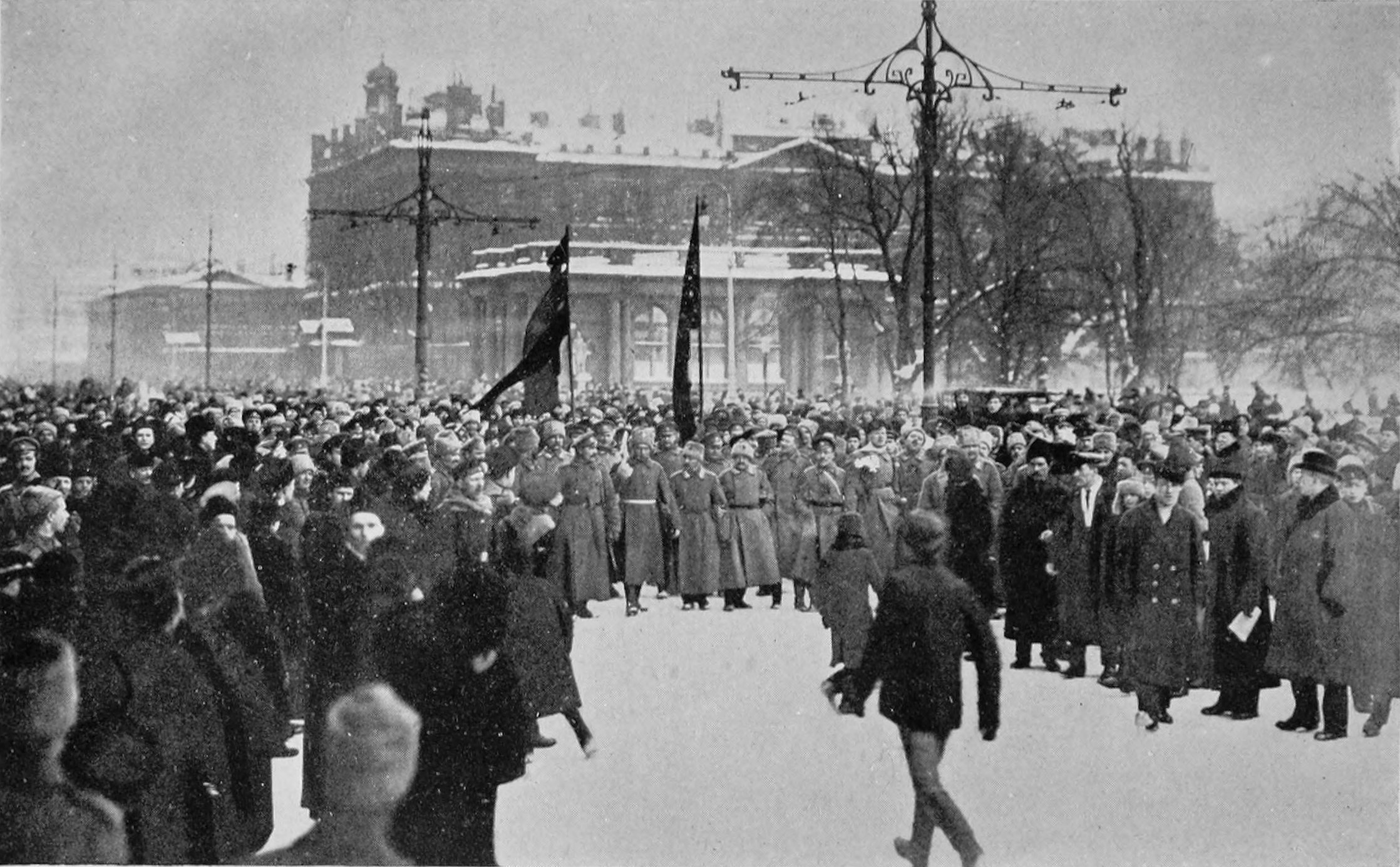
Crowd on the Nevsky Prospect in Saint Petersburg during the February Revolution.

Alexander III was succeeded by Nicholas II. His reign, which opened with a disastrous stampede following his coronation that he was seen as ignoring, marked a sharp decline in the popularity of the tsarist system, as he proved to be inept and incompotent. Russia was defeated by Japan in the Russo-Japanese War in 1905, which prompted the First Russian Revolution that resulted in Nicholas agreeing to establish a constitutional monarchy. In World War I, in which Russia fought against the German-led Central Powers alongside the Entente, his popularity further declined, as Russia performed terribly in the war even with him directly commanding the army. Facing military defeat, low war enthusiasim, and poor standards of living, on March 8, 1917 (International Women's Day), a large crown of female workers organized together in a strike; the demonstrations swiftly grew into what became the February Revolution. (Note: At the time, Russia was still using the Julian Calendar, which was thirteen days behind the Gregorian Calendar commonly used at the time and universally used contemporarily. As such, the February Revolution occurred from March 8–16, 1917, in the Gregorian Calendar (New Style) and from February 23–March 3, 1917, in the Julian Calendar (Old Style), while the October Revolution occurred on November 7 (NS) and October 25 (OS).) Facing mounting pressure, Nicholas II abdicated; his officers advised him to cede the throne to his heir and son, Alexei, but since he was only twelve and battling haemophilia, he instead offered it to his brother Michael. Michael was reluctant to rule, and only stated he would so so if offered to by the constitutional assembly that was to be eventually established.

The new Russian Provisional Government became unpopular and the liberals and Marxists that had worked together in the revolution began fighting. After an attempted right-wing coup in September, the provisional government's chair, Alexander Kerensky, declared the Russian Republic, formally ending around four centuries of Tsarist rule in Russia. Later fighting between the liberals and Marxist Bolsheviks erupted into the October Revolution on November 7. The ensuing Russian Civil War saw the Bolsheviks, or Reds, defeat the Whites and form the Soviet Union, with Vladimir Lenin as its leader. Both the Reds and Whites committed numerous atrocities; as part of the Red's campaign, the Russian imperial family, including Nicholas, was executed by a mob of Bolshevik soldiers on the night of July 16–17, 1918, possibly on the orders of Lenin.

== Government ==
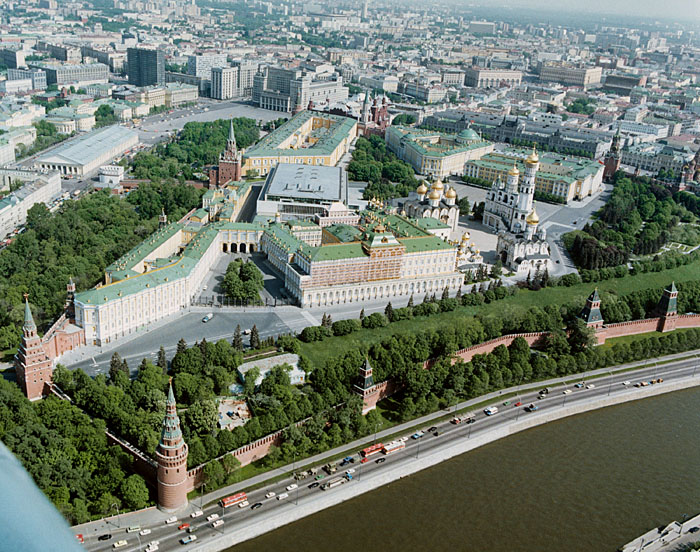
The Kremlin in Moscow, residence of the Tsars under the Tsardom of Russia

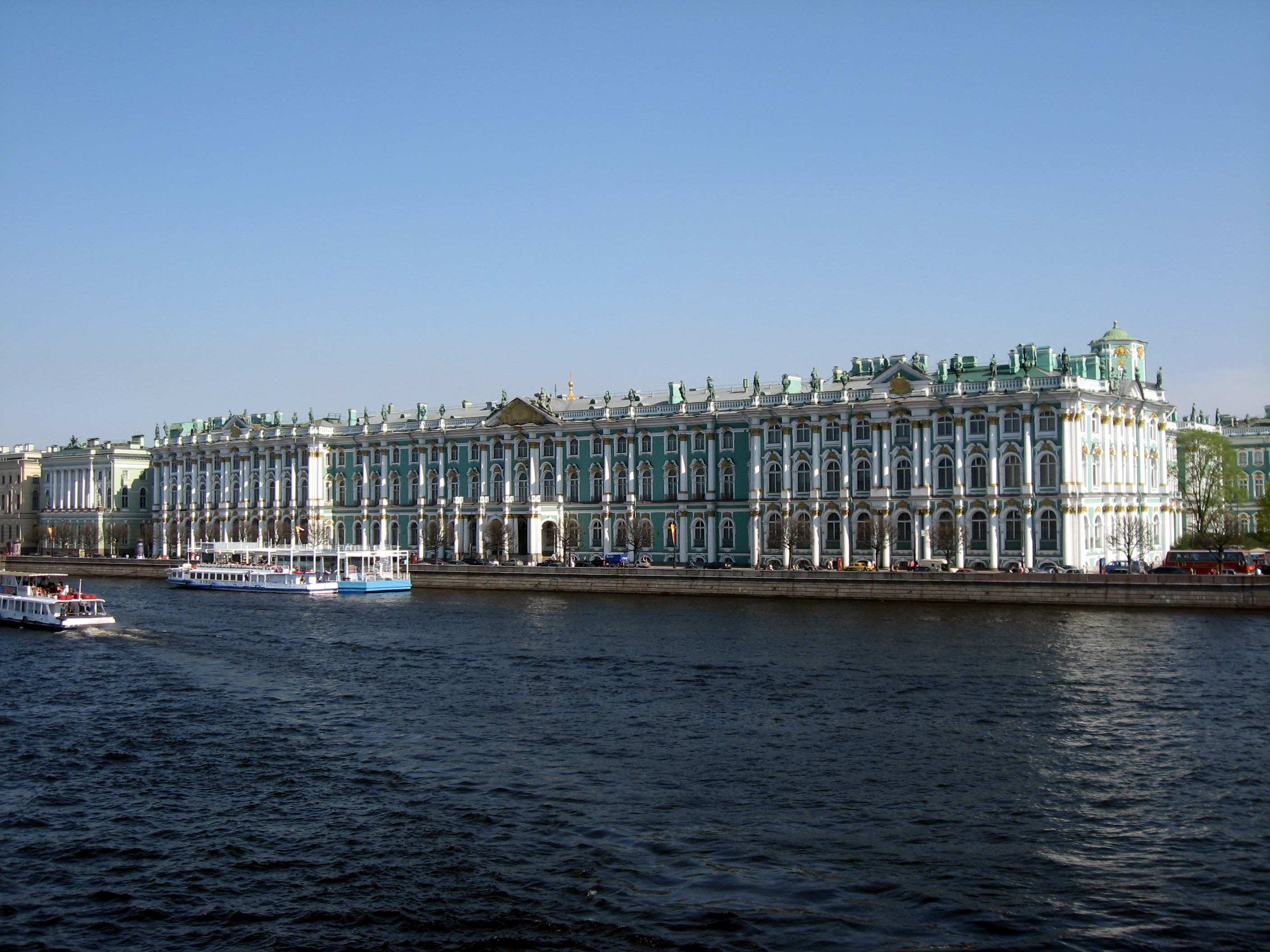
The Winter Palace in Saint Petersburg (right), residence of the Tsars under the Russian Empire.

As the tsarist system began to develop with the formation of the centralized Russian state in the late 15th century, a political system emerged characterized chiefly by the extraordinary dominance of the central Russian monarch. The government of tsarist Russia was an autocratic monarchy, first in practice and theory for most of its history, and then briefly only in practice during its final decade of existence. This form of governance, dubbed Tsarism, became the staple feature of Russia under the Tsars, and held influence on subsequent governments of Russia such as the Soviet Union.

Under the Kyivan Rus, appanages among the various principalities were common, contributing to the feudal disintegration that led to the eventual collapse of the state. Muscovy initially followed a similar system, but over time, the appanage system was largely abolished to make way for a more centralized state, ending the era of Appanage Russia. This was a personal project of Ivan the Great, and by the end of his reign in 1505, only one appanage principality remained. Appanage princes were instead increasingly merged into the service class, becoming boyars.

The vast growth of Russia under Ivan necessitated the overhaul of the administrative system. Under him and his successor Vasily III, the origins of the Russian bureaucracy began to be seen with the establishment of the dyaki. The Russian bureaucracy continued to grow over the Tsardom period, growing greatly during the 17th century as a result of a string of weak rulers under the House of Romanov. By the time of Peter the Great, the chinovniki, as they were called following the codification of the Tsarist bureaucracy in 1722, grew to be a large and integral part of the state apparatus, controlling administrative and even judicial functions. The Tsarist bureaucracy proved to be very corrupt, and Peter and Catherine the Great attempted in various ways to make them more meritocratic. The system proved to be an adept method of social mobility throughout the 18th century, though reforms in the 19th century reduced this to limit the influx of rank careerists and commoners into the Russian nobility.

The Russian leadership generally adhered to a certain form of conservative-traditionalism, occasionally (and staring in the mid-19th century, increasingly) buttressed by reform. Much like how the Byzantine Empire's governance and institutions were imported into Russia in a more crude form, the Enlightenment came to Russia in a limited form as well, with Russia rejecting rationality and instead prioritizing a romantic narrative of a state oriented around the beliefs, values, and behavior of their distinctive people. In addition, "progress", as understood in the west, entailing the gradual liberation of peoples and betterment of the individual, was replaced in Russia with modernization meant to serve the existing structure. The notion of progress and development in service of autocracy frightened some. The 19th century Russian intellectual Alexander Herzen warned that technological modernization without institutional modernization would result in a Russia that was like "Genghis Khan with a telegraph."

The capital of Russia before Peter the Great was Moscow, as the eponymous center of the Muscovite Principality; the Tsars resided in the city's Kremlin in various palaces. During the Petrine era and amid the Great Northern War, the capital was moved to a Swedish fortress seized by Russian forces named Nyenschantz at the mouth of the Neva, right on the Gulf of Finland. A new city was named after Peter's eponymous patron saint, Saint Peter. This new city, Saint Petersburg, officially became the capital in 1712. The city was rapidly built up using serf, slave, and Swedish POW labor from across the realm; up to 200,000 people died during the process. Backlash against the Petrine reforms on the part of the Russian nobility prompted the capital to be moved back to Moscow under Peter II in 1728; following his death in 1730, his successor, Anna, relocated the capital back to Saint Petersburg. Saint Petersburg would go on to surpass Moscow in population by the late 19th century, however, Moscow would remain an important symbolic, cultural, and administrative center as the nexus of the Russian state. The imperial family continued to use the city as a residence, expanding the Kremlin to include new palaces, including the Grand Kremlin Palace in 1849, which served as their principal Muscovite residence; after the end of Tsarist Russia, it would go on to house the Supreme Soviet of the Soviet Union and now serves as the official workplace and residence of the Russian President. The official imperial residence in Saint Petersburg was the Winter Palace, built in its current form in 1762.

=== Tsar ===
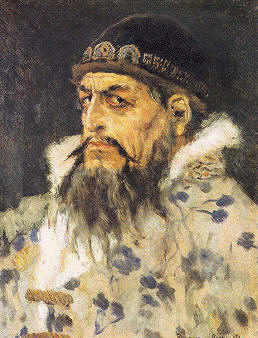
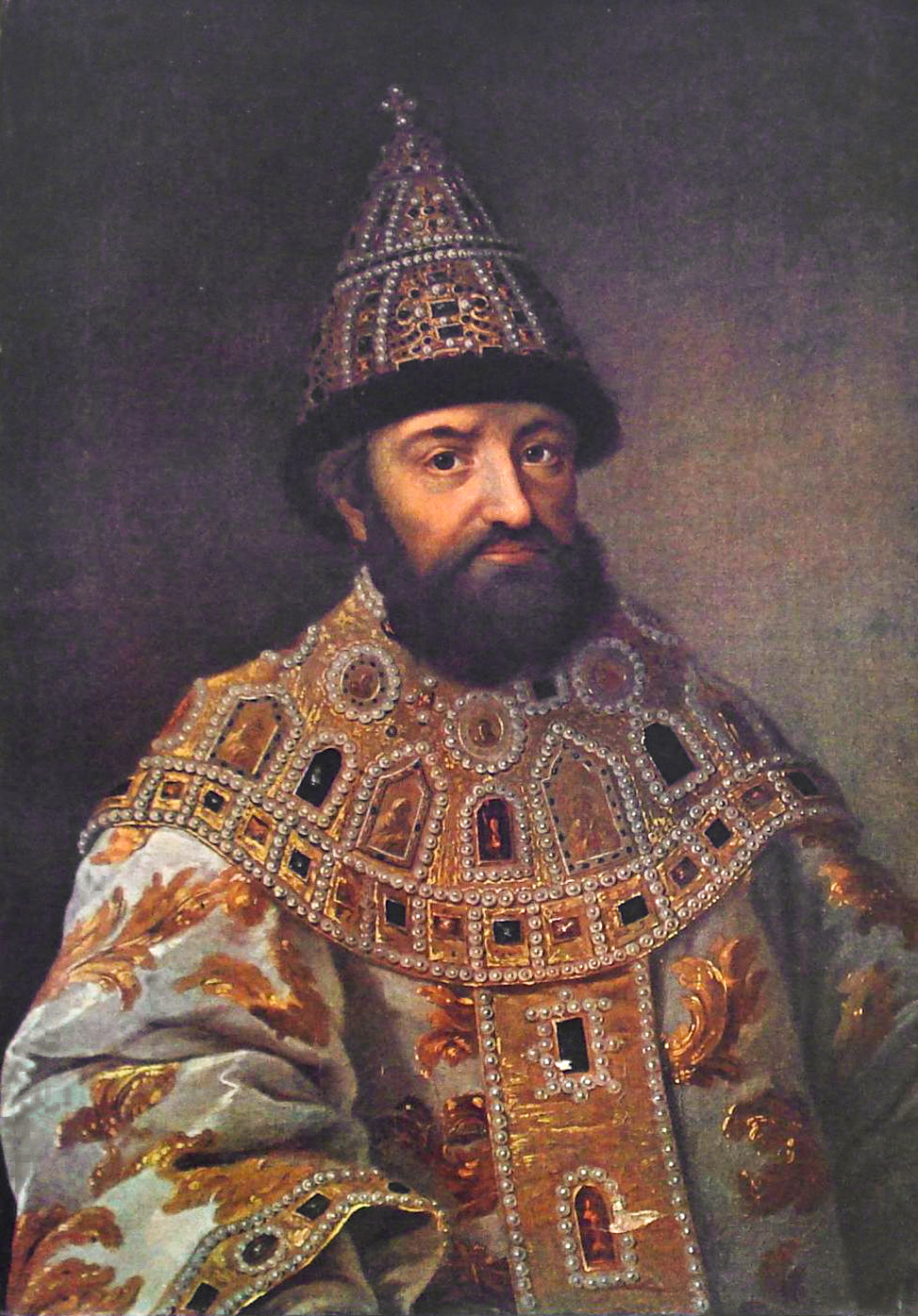
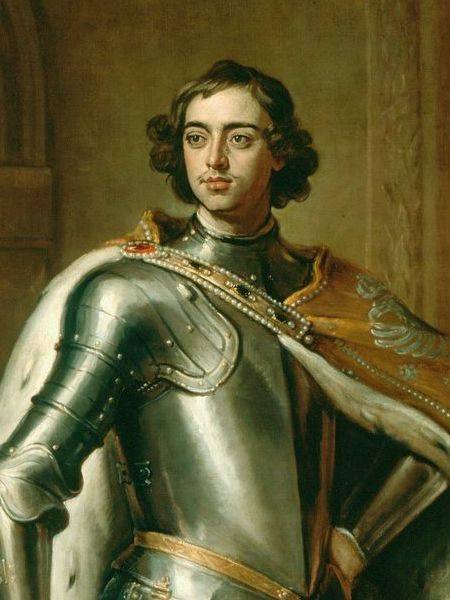
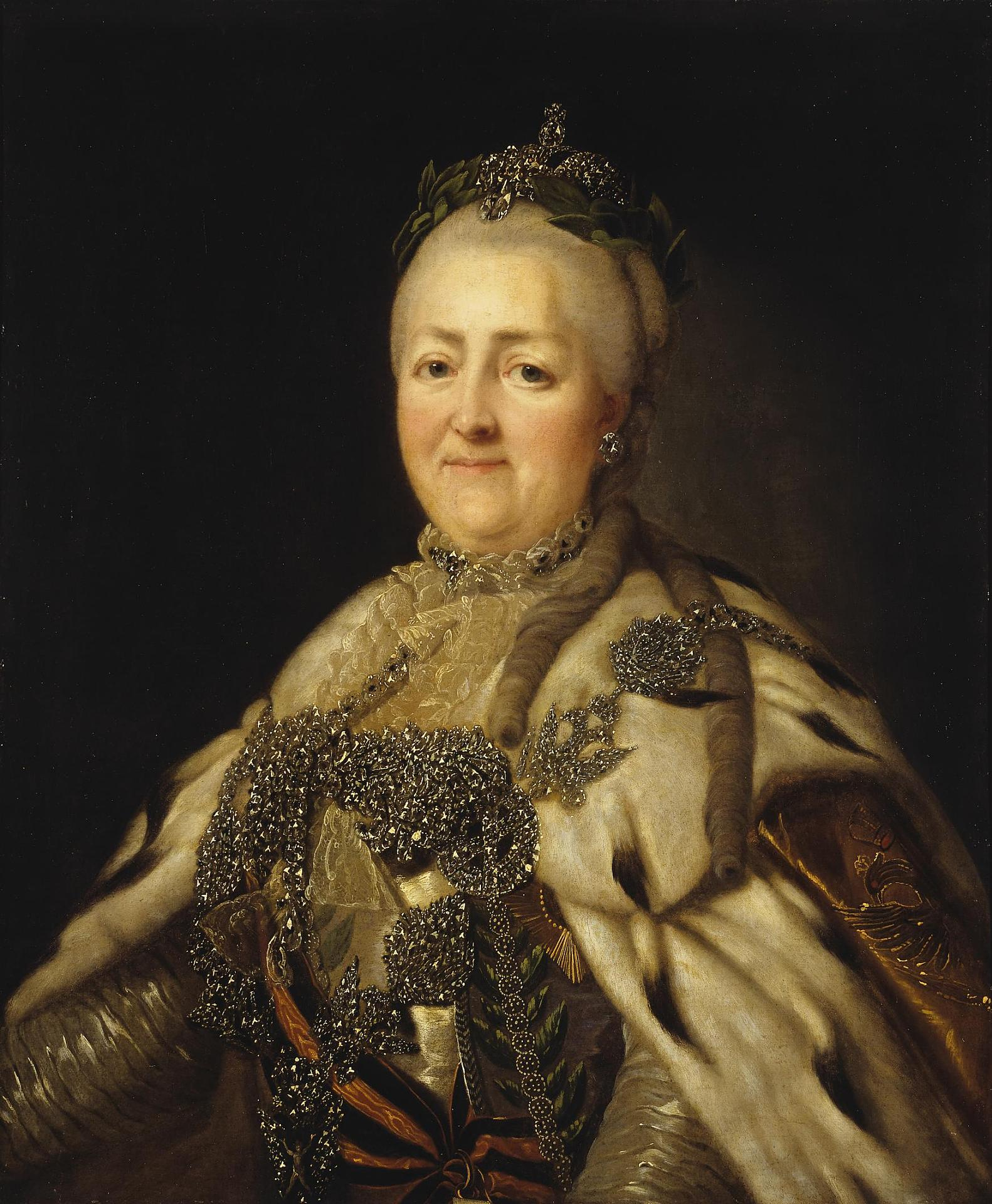
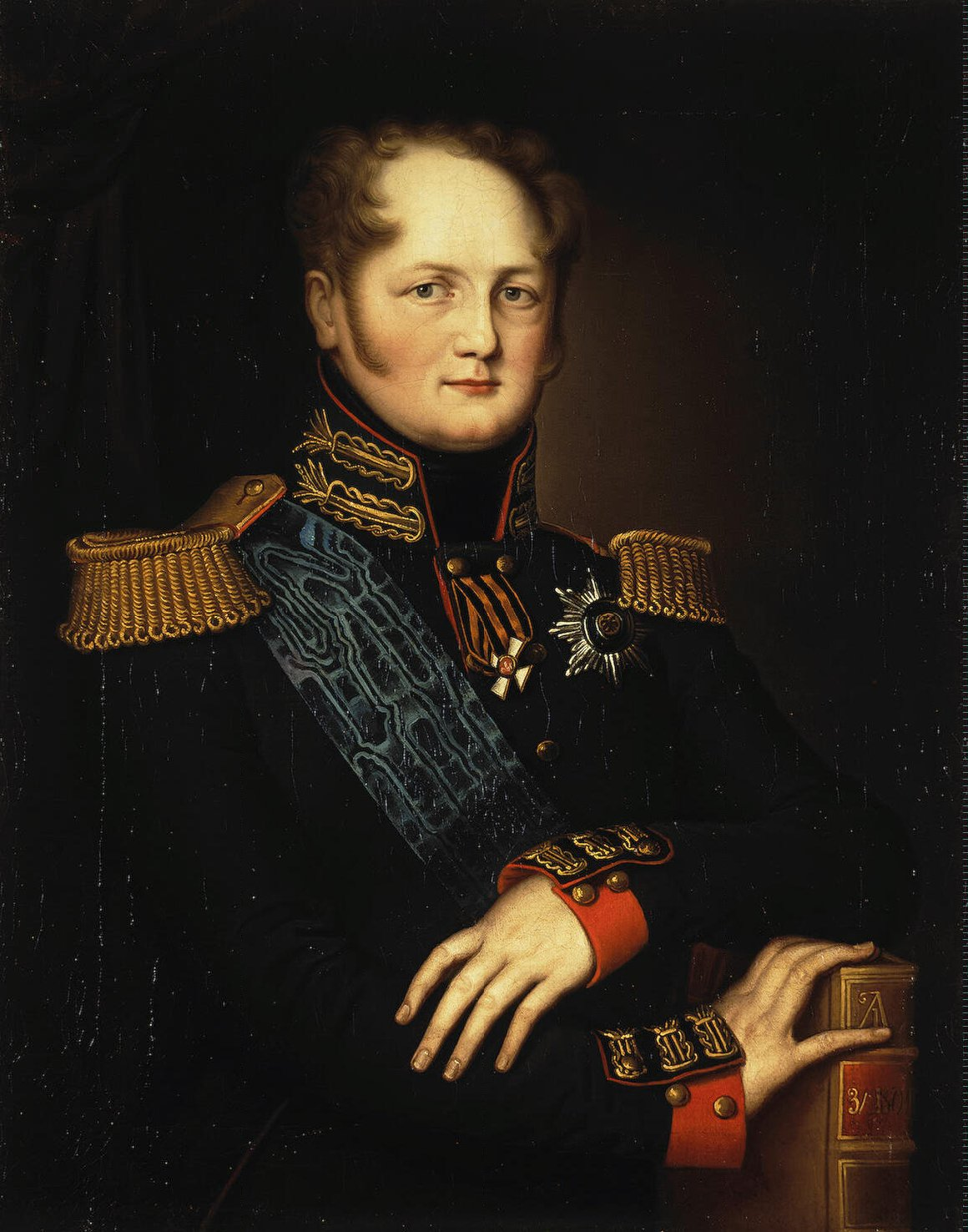
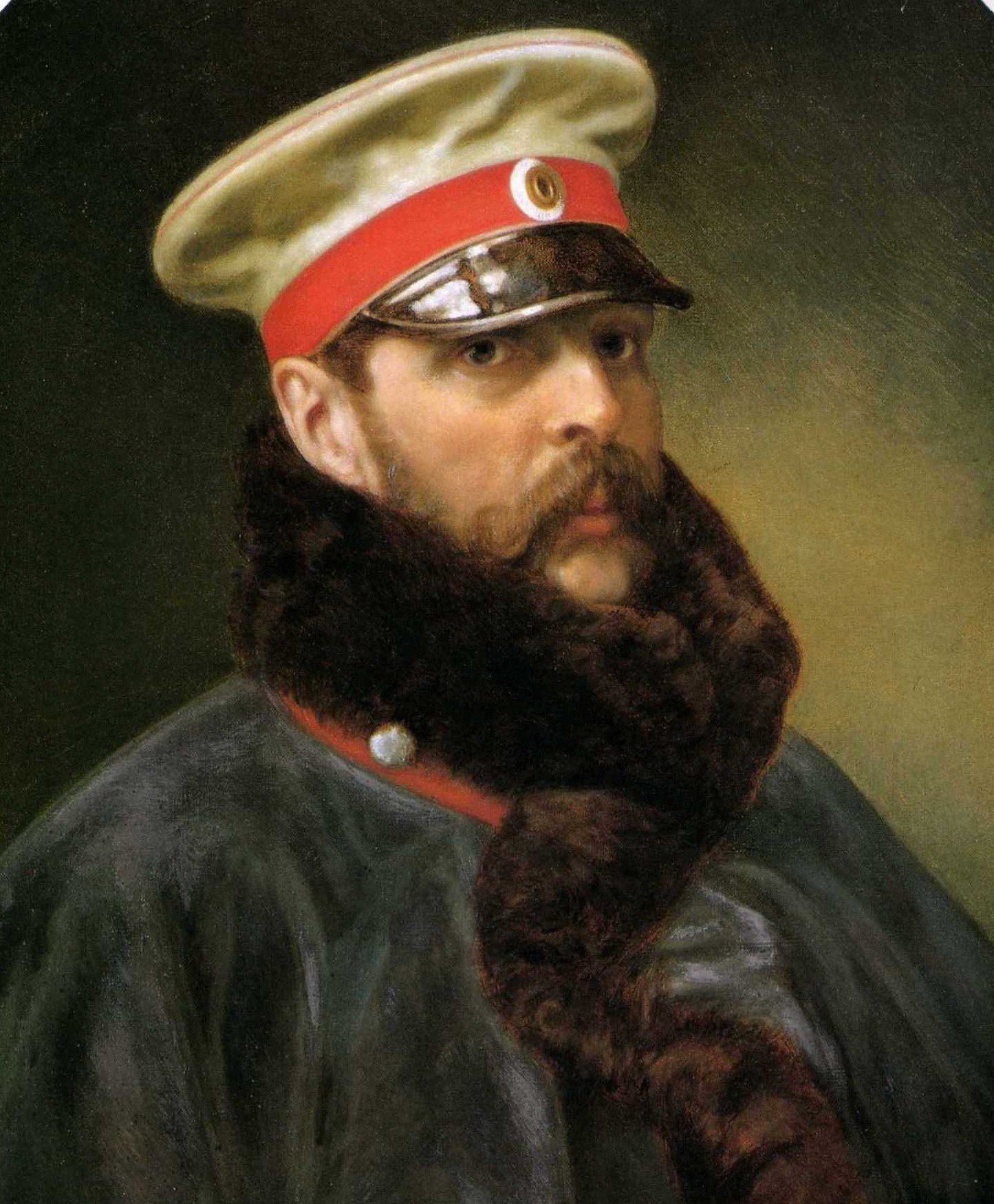
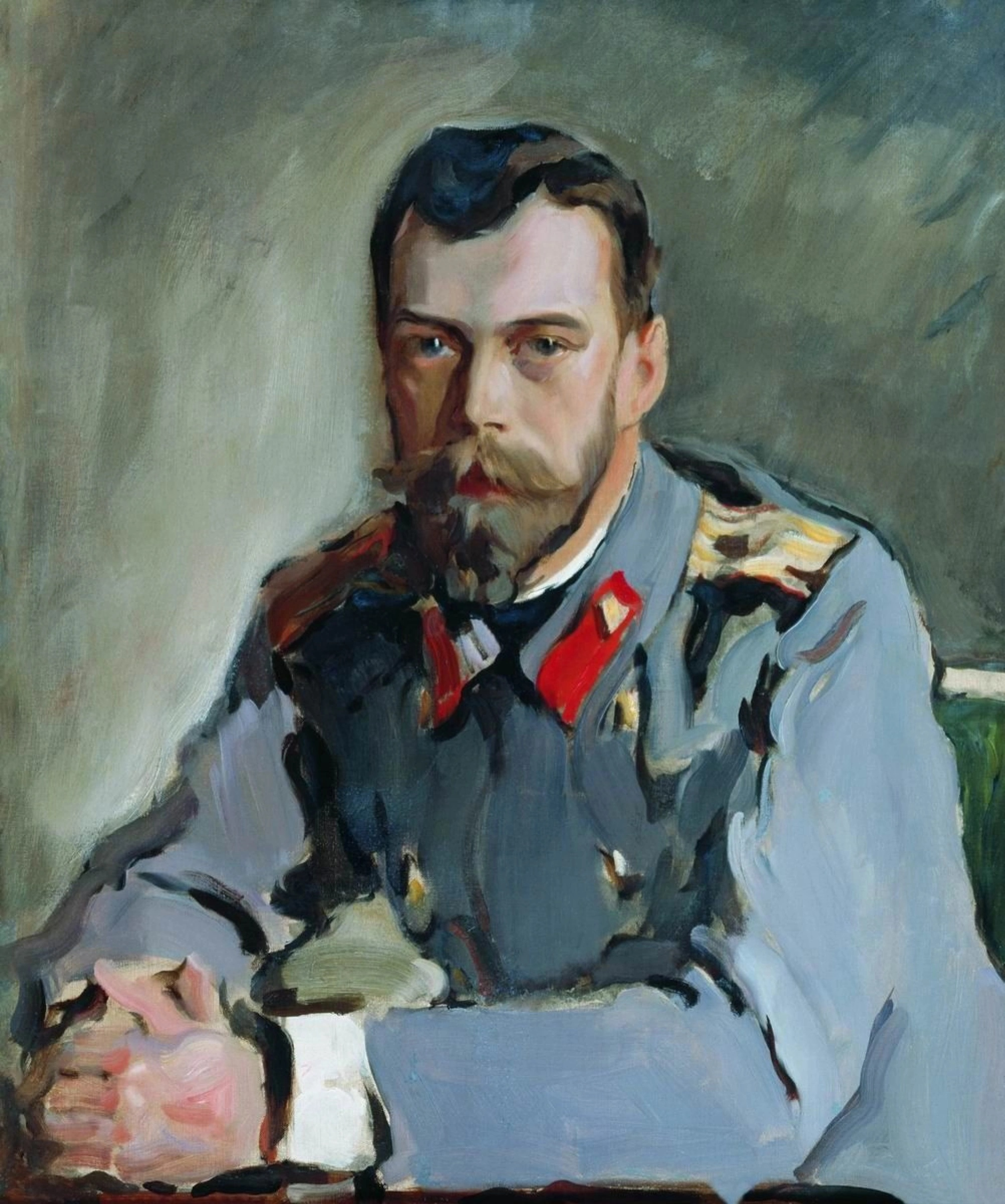
Several notable Tsars and a Tsarina. Clicking on any of the images will take you to their respective article.

From 1547 to 1917, Russia was formally governed by a Tsar, stylized from 1547 to 1721 as the Tsar of all Russia, and from 1721 to 1917 as the Emperor and Autocrat of all Russia. The name change of the title in 1721, as well as the accompanying change of the state name from Tsardom to Empire, was meant to further assert their imperial rank to Western Europeans. The feminine term for Tsar was Tsarina (officially Empress after 1721). The Russian Tsars ruled as autocratic monarchs.

Even after the capital was moved to Saint Petersburg in the 18th century, Russian Tsars were always coronated in Moscow, at the Kremlin's Dormition Cathedral. These coronations were huge affairs, with up to half a million people attending; festivities after the final coronation in 1896 precipitated one of the deadliest stampedes in history. Under the Tsars, starting from Ivan the Great, they took on imagery from the coronation of the Byzantine emperor to solidify their imperial status and claim to be the inheritors of the Byzantine legacy. From the Muscovite Prince Dmitry Donskoy in the mid-14th century to Peter the Great in the late 17th century, the monarch used Monomakh's Cap, a crown inspired by those of Central Asia. Following the Petrine reforms, a series of western-influenced diadems were used until the new Imperial crown of Russia was designed by the Swiss jewelers Georg Friedrich Ekart and Jérémie Pauzié in 1762 for the coronation of Catherine the Great.

The imperial claim originated from the fall of the Byzantine Empire. As the Byzantine Empire went into decline, many in the Eastern Orthodox world looked to the rising Muscovite Principality as being the new defenders of Eastern Orthodox Civilization and inheritors of the Roman imperial legacy. Under Ivan the Great, the term tsar, a Slavicized corruption of the word caesar, began to be used in 1484, mostly in foreign correspondence. The term had already been used commonly among other Slavic peoples to describe their greatest rulers, such as the Bulgarians for their first and second empires and the Serbs for their empire. Having already adopted the title of "Sovereign of all Russia", Ivan began using tsar to assert his connection to the Byzantine Empire, and the move was accompanied with increased Byzantophilic influences in Russia, such as the adoption of the double-headed eagle. Ivan's grandson, Ivan the Terrible, would become the first to be domestically crowned Tsar in 1547, establishing the Tsardom of Russia.

As Russia consolidated into a centralized state, Tsarism began to take hold. A new political system emerged centering the Grand Prince and later Tsar as the preeminent and dominant force in the realm, who held it as his personal patrimony. This was in part due to the influence of the Mongols, whose destructive force they levied against the East Slavs during their invasions in the 13th century, as well as the centuries of suzerainty under their descendants, resulted in a powerful, autocratic, and centralized state emerging to forcefully protect itself and organize society. The Tsar held full control of his realm and its people. He carried himself in a paternalistic manner, and was essentially unrestrained; there existed only two limits: that he be a member of the Russian Orthodox Church, and after 1796, that he follow the Pauline Laws of succession. Although the First Russian Revolution in 1905 resulted in the last Tsar, Nicholas II, reluctantly creating an elected assembly, to reinforce his power and demonstrate that he was still supreme autocrat of Russia, the subsequent 1906 constitution essentially kept him as such, with him being able to dismiss the new State Duma at will.

In addition to Tsar or Emperor (and their respective feminine equivalents when appropriate), the gender-inverted forms of their titles would be used to refer to their spouses (since none of the Tsarina-regents had publicly documented (Note: There is evidence to suggest that Catherine the Great privately married her lover Grigory Potemkin sometime in the late 18th century) spouses during their reigns, the consorts of Tsarist Russia were always Tsarina-consorts). Before the Petrine reforms, in accordance with Byzantine tradition, wives of the Tsars were often selected from bridal-shows, or beauty pageants where often poor but good-looking noblewoman would gather in an attempt to make the Tsar choose them. This closed Russia off from the benefits of royal intermarriage, such as alliances or reduction of tensions, but also prevented inbreeding and the influence of foreign royalty; the only foreign Tsarinas before Peter the Great was the Kabardian princess, Maria Temryukovna, who married Ivan the Terrible in 1561, as well as the Polish noblewoman Marina Mniszech, who married False Dmitry I (Note: False Dmitry refers to various impostors of Dmitry of Uglich, the youngest son of Ivan the Terrible and heir to the throne during much of the reign of his half-brother, Feodor I, in the late 16th century. False Dmitry I was the only one to become Tsar; the second one, False Dmitry II, would also marry Mnishek due to various geostrategic interests present in Poland–Lithuania; see Time of Troubles for more information.) for nine days in May 1606 until his murder during the Time of Troubles. As part of the Petrine reforms, the Tsars began intermarrying with European royalty; no consort following Peter's first wife, Eudoxia Lopukhina, would be of Russian extraction. In accordance with the westernization of Tsarist Russia during this era, Peter's reign saw the increased normalization of imperial mistresses and lovers; beforehand, stricter adherence to Eastern Orthodox piety rendered public displays of infidelity amongst the Tsars more taboo, though their remained numerous allegations of such during the Tsardom period. The legitimate sons and daughters of a Tsar would be given the title of tsarevich and tsarevna respectively until the Pauline Laws were enacted; following this, they were given the respective titles grand prince and grand princess. (Note: Typically translated into English as grand duke and grand duchess) The exception was the heir apparent or presumptive, who would be granted the title tsesarevich. (Note: Feminine: tsesarevna, though there were no female heirs during its use, and so this was only conferred to the wives of the tsesareviches)

=== Councils and legislatures ===
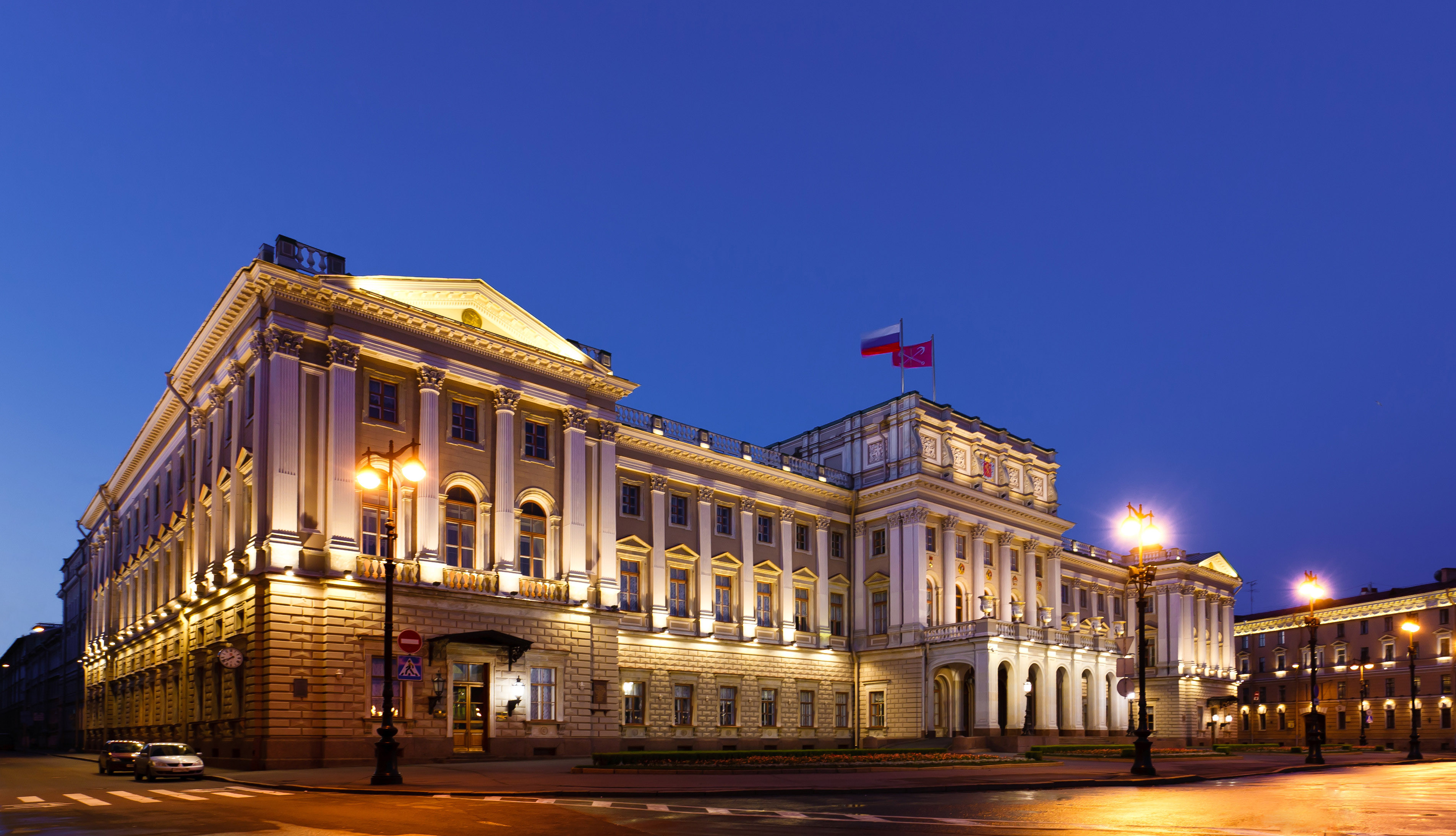
The Mariinsky Palace, where the State Council convened in the 20th century.

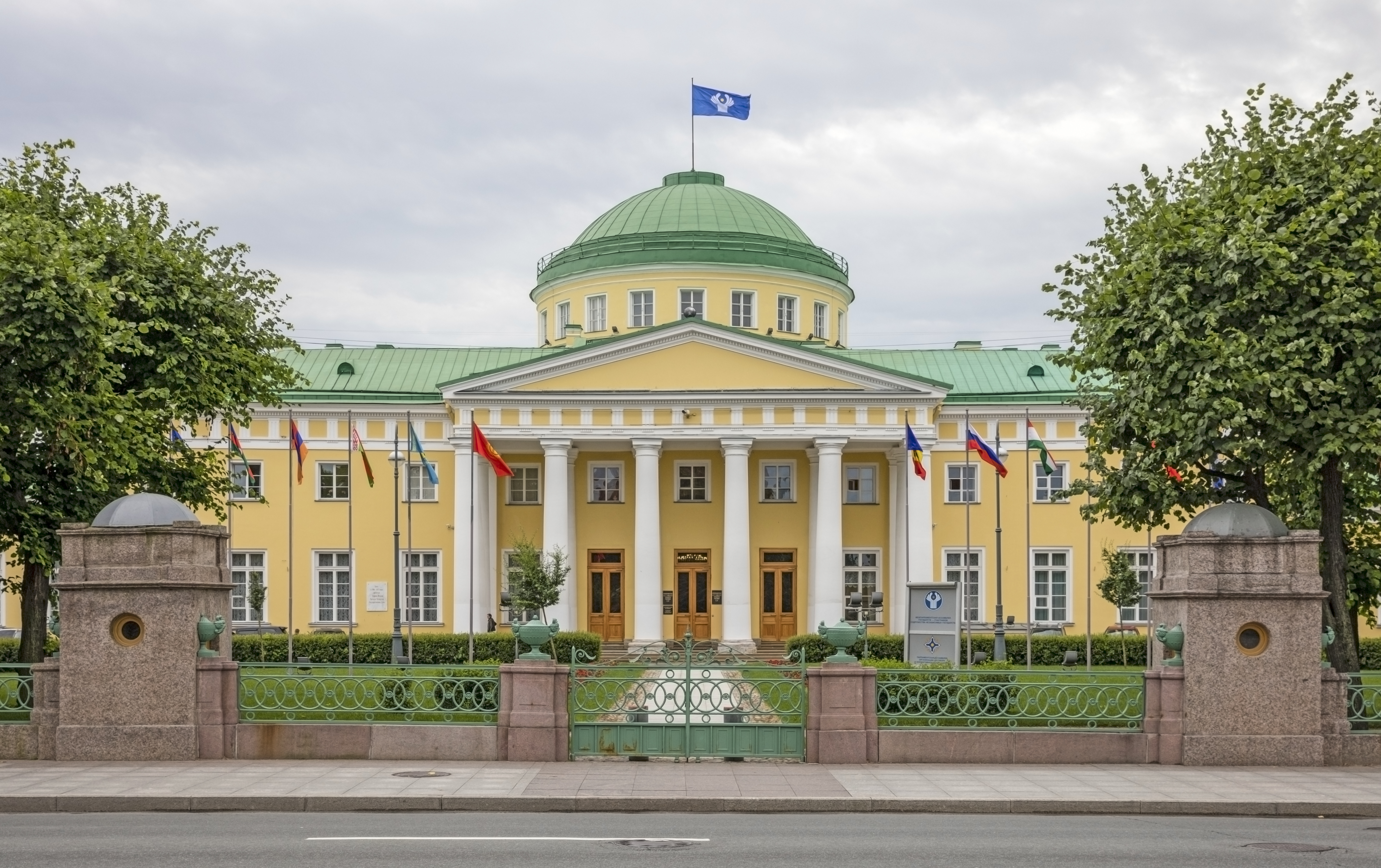
The Tauride Palace, the building at which the State Duma convened.

The Tsars were formally aided by a series of parliaments and councils subordinate to him. These were under various degrees of importance throughout the centuries. As an autocratic monarchy, these councils never seriously challenged the Tsar's power, until somewhat towards the end of Tsarist Russia. Before 1906, they generally consisted of high-ranking members in the estates of the realm.

Under the Grand Principality, the monarch was assisted by the boyar duma, an advisory council consisting of the boyars and okolnichies. Contemporarily referred to as simply "the boyars", or "the duma", it was also accompanied with the blizhnaya duma, or close duma, who maintained closer ties with the Tsar. Under Ivan the Terrible, the Zemsky Sobor, or a parliament of the three Russian estates: the nobility and bureaucracy, the high-ranking Eastern Orthodox clergymen (organized into the Holy Sobor), and representatives of the commoners (usually the bourgeoisie), was established. The Zemsky Sobor largely existed as a rubber-stamp organization, but did also address issues from the estates. It garnered great prominence during the Time of Troubles, where it elected new Tsars to help mend the crisis.

As absolutism grew into Europe, so did Russia, especially as the ascendent Romanovs entrenched themselves into power, and these councils and assemblies saw a contraction in their power. The 1654 Zermsky Sobor, held to ratify the agreement that made the Cossack Hetmanate a vassal of the Russian Tsar, would be the last for three decades, until the 1680s, when it was held to abolished the mestnichestvo hierarchal system and the Treaty of Perpetual Peace with the Commonwealth. As part of the Petrine reforms, absolutism increased, and the Zemsky Sobor was never summoned again by the dawn of Peter the Great's reign. In 1711, during the Great Northern War, he transferred the functions of the boyar duma to the newly created Governing Senate, based in Saint Petersburg, initially meant to help administer the state in Peter's absence while he was on campaign. The Procurator General chaired the Senate, which, despite being initially for wartime governance, was never dissolved following the conclusion of the war in 1721, becoming the highest judicial, administrative, and legislative body in Russia. It included a multitude of departments, such as cassation courts and a heraldry department. Under Alexander I, the State Council was established in 1810. As part of the reforms implemented by Mikhail Speransky, it was initially meant to be the upper chamber to the Senate, forming the basis for a proper Russian legislature, but it instead became the closest advisory body to the Tsar for the first century of its existence.

Session of the first Duma, 1906

In 1905, Tsar Nicholas II was forced to create a proper legislature following a domestic revolution. As part of this, the State Council, now the Imperial Council, was made into the upper chamber of the Russian legislature, with the newly created State Duma forming the lower chamber. The latter convened in the Tauride Palace, and consisted of around 500 legislators. Despite this concession, Nicholas II maintained his right as a "supreme autocrat" in the 1906 Russian constitution. The first Duma elections in that year brought a delegation consisting mainly of moderates; the session was unable to accomplish much and was quickly dismissed. At its end, Pyotr Stolypin was appointed prime minister, and he would implement an incredible degree of reform in Tsarist Russia's final years until his assassination in 1911. Elections in January 1907 saw more radical parties, such as the Social Democrats (RSDLP) and Socialist Revolutionaries (SR) gain seats; in the prior election, they had boycotted participation. Stolypin accused the SR and RSDLP of fomenting a violent revolution, and the session was dismissed for another round of elections in October. In violation of the 1906 constitution, rules and laws regarding elections were amended without the Duma's consent prior to the election to favor ethnically Russian landowners, businessman, and the nobility. The subsequent parliament had more cordial relations with the Tsar as a result, and a record 200 pieces of legislation were passed, becoming the only session to finish out its full five-year term in 1912. The subsequent session elected in that year grew largely irrelevant as World War I and the Russian Revolution kicked off, and the Duma was dissolved by one of its most prominent members, Alexander Kerensky, on October 6, 1917, under the newly established Russian Republic. It was to be replaced by the Provisional Council, which was to be subsequentially replaced by the Constituent Assembly, but the October Revolution and subsequent Russian Civil War prevented this.

The Senate and Synod Building housed both the Governing Senate and Most Holy Synod

The Russian Orthodox Church had various degrees of influence throughout the Tsarist era, gradually becoming weaker as time went on. The church declared autocephaly from Constantinople in 1448, following the widely unpopular Florentine Council that saw a flailing Byzantine Empire attempt to garner western support via mending the Great Schism. Constantinople formally recognized the Russian Church's autocephaly in 1589. In 1652, Nikon was elected Patriarch, and he began a series of wide-ranging reforms that saw the Russian Church become very powerful, often rivaling the Tsar Alexis in matters of state. In 1667, Alexis convened a synod in response, where Patriarch Nikon was deposed and reduced to being a simple monk; his liturgical reforms were preserved however, leading to a longstanding schism with the so-called Old Believers. Attempts by the Russian state to enforce the Nikonian reforms was accompanied by the ever-increasing involvement of the Tsarist government in the control of Russian's lives, often prompting violent resistance such as the Solovetsky Monastery uprising from 1668 to 1676 and the Moscow uprising of 1682. Under Peter the Great, who wanted to secularize Russia to a greater degree, the schism largely subsided, but he would also continue to reign in the power and independence of the church. Upon the death of Patriarch Adrian in 1700, he refused to have another be elected. In 1721, he established the Most Holy Synod, the supreme organ of government of the Russian Orthodox Church. It was presided over by a lay procurator, representing the tsar, and consisted of the three metropolitans of Moscow, Saint Petersburg, and Kiev, and, following the Russian conquest of the last Kartvelian kingdom in 1801, the Exarch of Kartvelia, as well as a number of bishops sitting in rotation. This effectively transformed the church into a stooge of the state until the February Revolution, when the patriarchy would be reestablished and the Most Holy Synod abolished.

=== Administrative divisions ===
First, second (uezd), and third (localities) level division map of Russia in 1897.

The gathering of the Russian lands in the late 15th century prompted reforms to the administrative structure of the Muscovite state. Ivan the Great and Vasily III largely chose nobles from their court to serve as provincial administrators, much like their predecessors, to help centralize Moscow's control over the disparate regions, however, local tradition remained strong, with Novgorod maintaining its own currency, while many regions retained independent measuring systems; internal trade barriers also remained common. Local governors typically served for a year or two before returning to Moscow. In times of great strife, a member of the Tsar's inner circle may be sent instead. Vasily III established the gorodovoy prikazchik under his tenure; these were the commandants of certain towns who headed its garrison, as well as managed food, weapons, and logistical supplies for local fortresses. They also undertook certain gubernatorial actions such as tax collection and maintaining order.

Under the Tsardom, Ivan the Terrible utilized various strategies to strengthen his control over the tsarist state, including his oprichnina, a secret police system, and anti-nobility proscriptions and laws. This destabilized Russia and precipitated the Time of Troubles, which saw Russia nearly collapse before being taken over by the Romanovs. Under the Romanovs, the issue of local administration was largely resolved; by the 1620s, most districts were run by town voevody who held financial, military, and judicial power. They reported to the prikazy, or central Muscovite offices. The guba, or police and self-governing zemsky assemblies that previously operated with much autonomy, were placed under their control. The prikazy, which served as administrative departments, ballooned from 22 in 1613, to around 80 by the mid-17th century. Certain departments administered entire regions like Siberia, and the system was extensively bureaucratized.

In spite of this improvement, the prikazy system was still somewhat haphazard, and amidst the Great Northern War, their territorial divisions were dissolved and replaced by Peter the Great. In their place came the governates. Initially numbering eight, they were headed by a powerful governor handpicked by the Tsar, who assumed complete control over local tax generation, conscription, judicial appeals, and military defense. The prikazy system would later be formally abolished in 1718, when their offices were replaced by nine collegia. The number of governates would increase via division and territorial expansion; in 1914, towards the end of Tsarist Russia's existence, there would be eighty one. In addition, there were twenty oblasts, and one okrug; including the vassal/protectorate states of Bukhara, Khiva, and Tuva, this amounted to there being 105 administrative divisions in Russia. Additionally, various large areas like Poland and Finland were under formal personal union with Russia with varying levels of autonomy, and were headed by a governor-general. Several larger cities also had their own governing systems, with the chief of police serving as governor, and following the freeing of the serfs in 1861, the zemstvo emerged as a system of local governance; all in all though, Tsarist Russia was a unitary state.

== Society ==
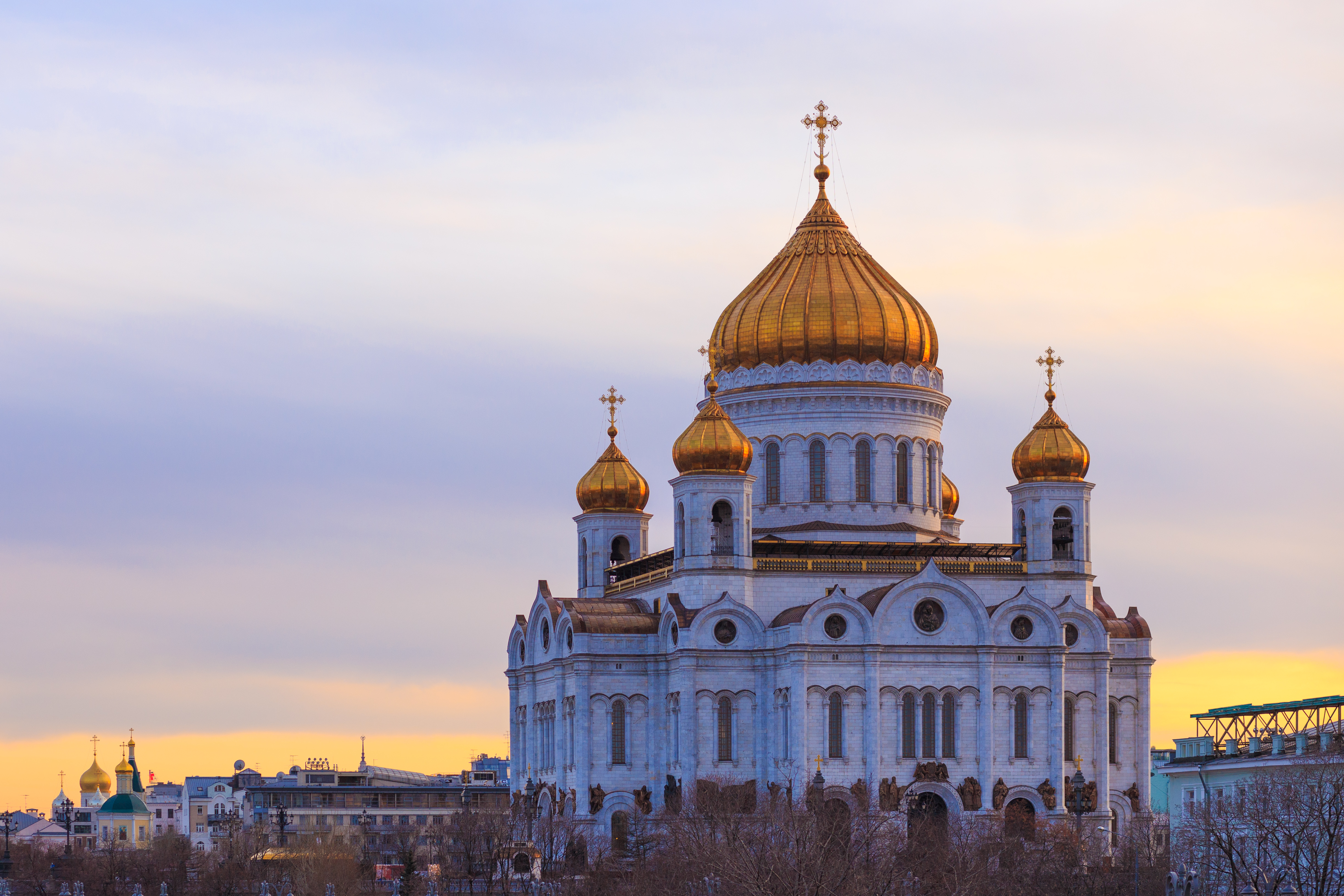
The Cathedral of Christ the Savior, built initially during the imperial era. Rebuilt in 2000 following its destruction by the Soviets to make way for a planned legislative chamber, it is an icon of Eastern Orthodoxy in Russia. Under the Tsars, the church penetrated into every facet of Russian society, and was a tool of state power.

The culture of Tsarist Russia was heavily influenced by the Byzantine inheritance, the climate and geography, and the legacy of the Tatar Yoke. The Eastern Orthodox Church had enormous influence on Russian society, controlling art, education, and moral law, especially prior to the Petrine reforms. Serving as the bedrock of society, the Church was a stooge of the broader Russian autocracy, and linked people with the Tsar, who was assumed to be divinely appointed to rule the Russian lands. The trauma from the Mongol conquest helped give way to a strong cultural aura of collectivism, as well as an emphasis on strong, central leadership that paved way for Tsarist autocracy and the severe social stratifications of Russian society that ultimately contributed to its demise.

Byzantine, Eastern Orthodox, and Slavic cultural influences helped shape the collective Russian identity over this time period, with Russia often being one of, if not the only independent Eastern Orthodox or Slavic countries during the Tsarist era. Russia's status as the main Slavic and Eastern Orthodox power reinforced the idea of it being the vanguard of Orthoslavic civilization, with the adoption of the title Tsar being used to reinforce the Byzantine connection, who previously held the title as the preeminent Eastern Orthodox state. The division of the East Slavs into lands under Russian control and the domains of the union of Poland and Lithuania, who would later form the Commonwealth, gave way to the development of an independent Ukrainian and Belarusian ethnocultural identity; as the Russians continued to understand these two emergent peoples as part of Russia, which was considered coextensive with the old identity of Rus, the irredentist concept of a triune Russian nation developed, arguing that what were now often called the Ruthenians were actually Russians, with Ukrainian and Belarusian just being a dialect of Russian and their national identity being the result of confusion from the separation and deliberate propagandization from the Commonwealth. As Ruthenia, or the lands of the Ukrainians and Belarusians, were largely absorbed into Russia following the Partitions of the Commonwealth, this narrative informed aggressive Russification policies in Ukraine and Belarus in an attempt to mend the unity of the East Slavs; backlash to this in the age of nationalism would lead to run-longing conflicts and disputes between the three peoples and their respective states that last until this day in both Belarus and Ukraine.

Russian propaganda booklet released in 1877 during the ongoing war with the Ottomans. Russia entered the war on a casus belli of saving the Christians of the Ottoman Empire, following the savage crushing of Bosnian Serb and Bulgarian revolts in the years prior.

The conception of Russia as a Slavic and Eastern Orthodox defender helped enforce its image as a defender of said peoples. From the 18th century onwards, starting with the Orlov revolt in Greece, Tsarist Russia continually intervened in the affairs of the Ottoman Empire as it entered into decline, seeking to liberate the South Slavic and Christian (often Eastern Orthodox) peoples under Turkish rule. Throughout this era, Russia supported the Serbian Revolution that led to an independent Serb state, as well as the Greek War of Independence; they also went to war with the Turks in the 1850s and 1870s over the oppression of Christians in the empire, the latter of which saw at least effective independence of Bulgaria and Romania. In the First Balkan War from 1912 to 1913, the Russians supported the Christian Balkan League that nearly drove the Ottomans out of Europe, and Russian support of Serbia following the assassination of Archduke Franz Ferdinand helped precipitate the events that initiated World War I. Even following the Petrine reforms, this conception of Russia helped distinguish it from the rest of Europe, and its association with cultural traits common in Eastern Europe helped pave the way for the notion of a Europe divided between East and West, as well as fueling the age-old conflict in Russia of its relationship with the rest of Western Civilization.

The top-down nature of Russian governance, compounded with the intense social stratification, rendered regional differences and importance in Russia to be of far smaller importance than other societies. The largest cultural differences, especially amongst ethnic Russians, often varied more by class than by region, in large part due to intermingling and interbreeding with foreigners on the part of the Russian nobility, be it the Tatars or Western Europeans. Russification policies throughout the state also limited this, especially during the Imperial era as the Tsars attempted to consolidate together the vast peoples of the empire.

=== Social stratification ===
Tsarist Russia was defined by its extremely rigid social order; among the most so in European history. The stratification of Russian society was unique in how much it was legally dictated, with various ordinances over the centuries explicitly defining the manner of the social order, unlike the comparably more informal class systems elsewhere in Europe. Additionally, this stratification was explicitly tied to state service. From the closing years of the Grand Principality to the Russian Revolution, Russian society was generally organized around a massive, often unfree and dispossessed peasantry, a tiny noble elite, and a weak middle-tier of persons.

Under the Kyivan Rus, a more meritocratic system was in place. Although still largely stratified, the Kievan Rus maintained a greater degree of social mobility than what was to succeed it in post-Mongol Russia, and also had a stronger merchant class. The annihilation of the pre-existing, largely aristocratic social orders of the East Slavs by the Mongols, and its subsequent replacement during the Tatar Yoke with suzerainty towards the Khan, compounded with the trauma response from the sudden destructive wave brought by the Mongols, and the shift of feudalism away from Western to Eastern Europe during the Early Modern Period, led to a more entrenched social order and the increased concentration of power into the Tsar, and where service to the state was the primary legitimizing force of elite status, unlike in Western Europe where nobility was inbounded with certain contractual obligations and hereditary rights that theoretically made the royal monarch a first among equals.

==== Russian Nobility ====
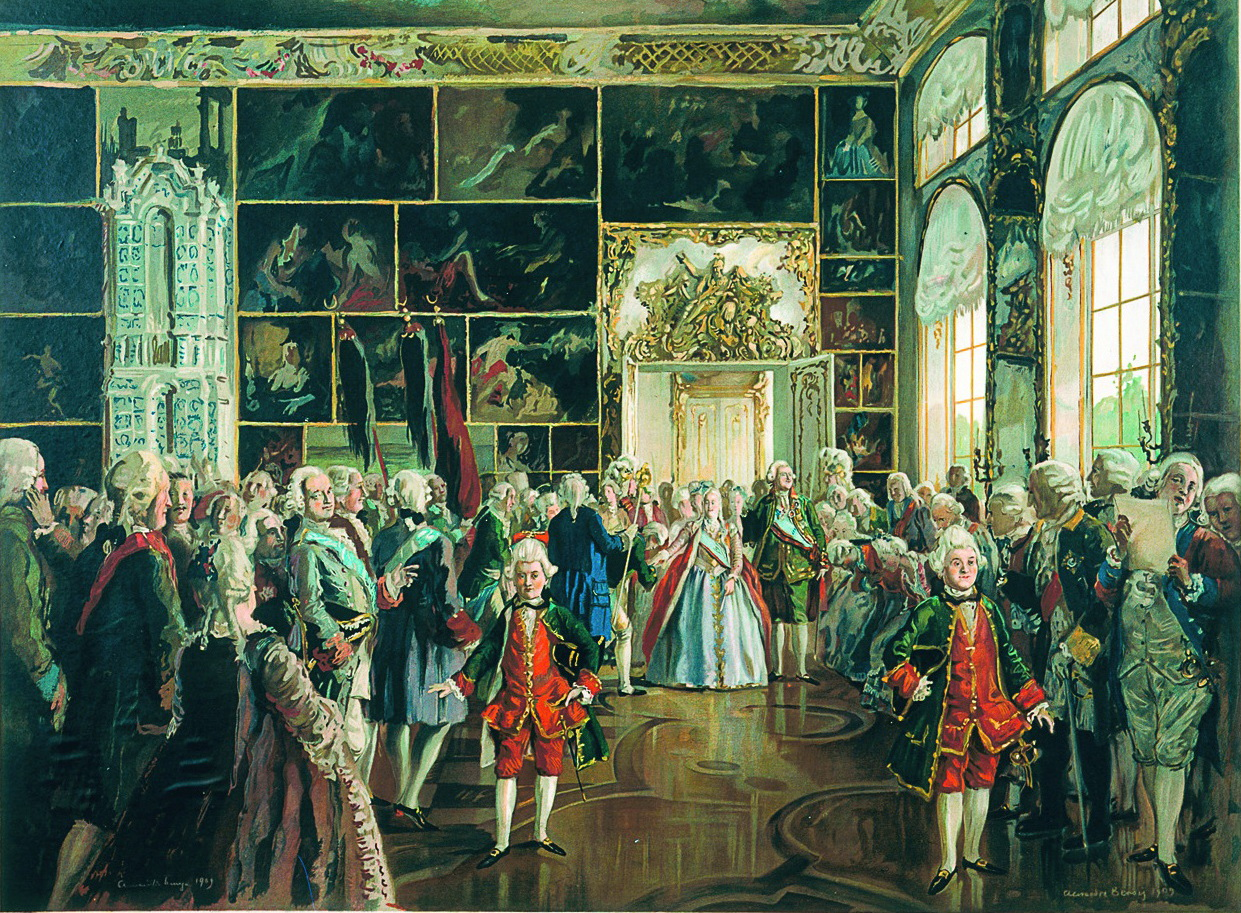
Appearance of Catherine II, by Alexandre Benois, 1912 painting showing 18th century Russian nobility

Beneath the Tsar were the Russian nobility. Comprising 1.38% of the Russian population in 1914, they traced their origins to the time of the Kievan Rus, initially through the boyars, who were an established force at the time of the polity's founding in the 9th century. The boyars in Russia dominated Russian political and military life throughout the Tsardom, controlling vast estates worked by serfs and exercising power via the Boyar Duma, through which they advised the Tsar. The preeminence of the boyars made them a natural target of the Tsar, and going as far back as Ivan the Great, there were efforts to limit and curtail their power and influence. Under Ivan the Terrible in the 16th century, they were subjected to increasingly sustained assault, with the oprichnina targeting them extensively, with mass executions, land confiscations, and exile becoming prominent. The mestnichestvo, used to govern precedence in hereditary rank, was terminated by Feodor III in 1682, with the convoluted network of ancestral records used to inform the system being famously burned to prevent feuding between noble families. Replaced with the purely symbolic Velvet Book, the abolition of the system removed one of the last formal guarantees of boyar privilege.

The Petrine reforms saw the complete destruction of the boyars as a serious political force, enabling Peter to govern more as he saw fit and more effectively embark upon westernizing Russia. The Boyar Duma was dissolved during this period, replaced by advisors largely imported from Western Europe, while the boyars were subjected, largely against their will, to cultural and sociopolitical westernization, which they had long opposed. Peter reorganized the Russian nobility in 1722, with the Table of Ranks, placing them, as well as the broader Russian elite, into a single hierarchy of fourteen civil, military, and courtly ranks each. Via the Table of Ranks, nobility could now be earned via service, with rank 14 and 8 (Note: Later ranks 8 and 5 respectively in the 19th century) in the military and civil rank system conferring hereditary nobility. This new meritocratic system created a new class of service nobleman who usurped the boyars as the predominant elite class.

The nobility's position got significantly strengthened throughout the 18th century as successive Tsars made major concessions to them to elicit support. In 1762, Peter III issued the Manifesto on the Freedom of the Nobility, which reversed the Petrine principle of mandated noble service; this was followed with the 1785 Charter to the Gentry under Catherine the Great, which resulted in the expansion of noble privileges, such as tax exemptions, not receiving corporal punishment, freedom from compulsory service, and fully property rights over their serfs and estate. The Russian nobility at the dawn of the 19th century was very heterogeneous. The most elite nobility consisted of a few hundred wealthy magnate families, possessing tens of thousands of serfs and sprawling estates. They were above a middle-tier of provincial gentry, who were responsible for local administration, who in turn were above a large class of serfless petty nobility who in practice where no better off than prosperous peasantry.

The 18th century privileges created a peculiar situation in which the Tsarist autocracy had granted Russian nobles a level of freedom that had not been greater, but level of political influence that was preciously little. Throughout the 19th century, the nobility began to seriously struggle financially, with indebtedness running rampant. By 1861, the majority of serf-owning estates were mortgaged to state credit institutions, while the subsequent emancipation of the serfs did not aid matters. The latter half of the 19th century saw a prolonged decline of the landowning nobility as a result.

==== The Serfdom ====
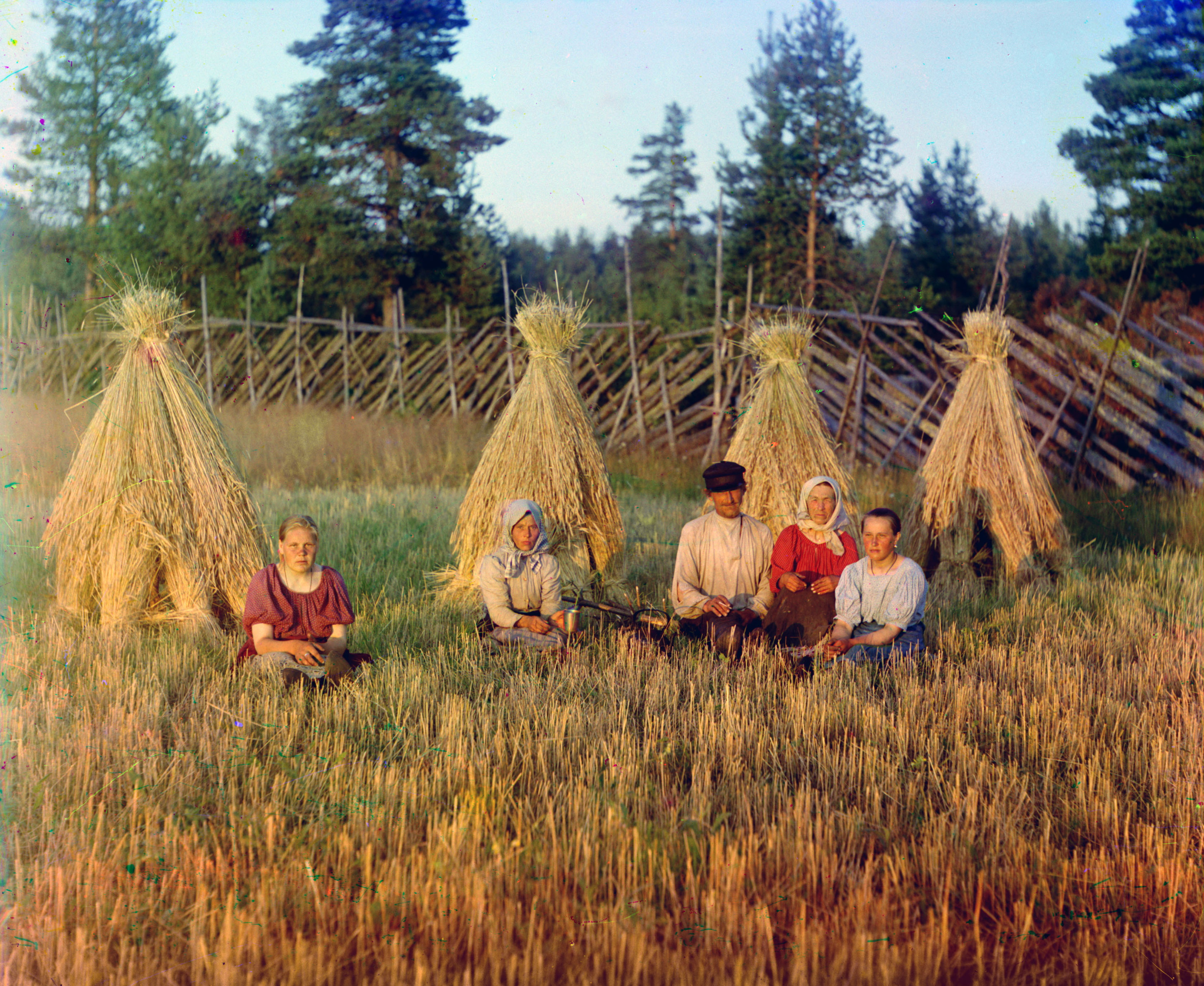
At harvest time, by Sergey Prokudin-Gorsky, 1909 (Yaroslavl Governorate)

The Russian serfdom composed of roughly 80 to 90% of the Tsarist state's population prior to the abolition of serfdom in 1861. Comprising the overwhelming majority of Russia's population, they too were subdivided into various inner stratas. There existed krepostnye krestiane, or privately owned peasantry controlled by the landed nobility, as well as the gosudarstvennye krestiane, or state peasantry, with obligations to the crown and lived on crown lands. The latter were generally more well off than the former, enjoying in practice more freedom to their subjugation being more distant, as well as having more land, but were nonetheless still burdened by taxation and obligations.

During the Middle Ages, the state of peasantry varied throughout Europe, but generally, serfdom predominated in the west while the average peasant in the east was free. Following the economic and social shifts caused by the Black Death in the west and the increasing prominence of the cities in that part of Europe in the early modern era, serfdom shifted to the east as the rising urbanized populous of Western Europe demanded a surplus of food to make up for the individuals leaving the farm. In Russia, this occurred. Before the Mongol conquest, the Kievan Rus was fairly economically prosperous, with extensive trade networks and free peasantry; however, the Mongols destroyed the economic base of the region and their tributary system of governance applied to the regional peasantry, and percolated downwards to the nobility. All these factors amplified the spread of serfdom eastwards into Russia by the 16th century.

From the 16th century onwards, the conditions of the serfdom would deteriorate increasingly. The Sobornoye Ulozheniye of 1649 permanently bound serfs to their lords and made their status hereditary; it also terminated the statute of limitations on the recapture of runways. Over time, their legal personhood was gradually eroded institutionally. Lords gained the power to sell them without land, inflict corporal punishment without recourse, exile them to Siberia, and interfere in their personal lives. It was common for Russian lords to sexually abuse their female serfs, with many keeping a company of them in a haremesque manner and prostitute them in brothels. By the dawn of the 18th century, the practical distinction between a slave and a serf in Russian society was narrow, with many historians comparing the institution to that of the contemporary slavery in the New World. Legally, the primary distinction was that lords could not formally kill their slaves, though in practice, this was rarely enforced.

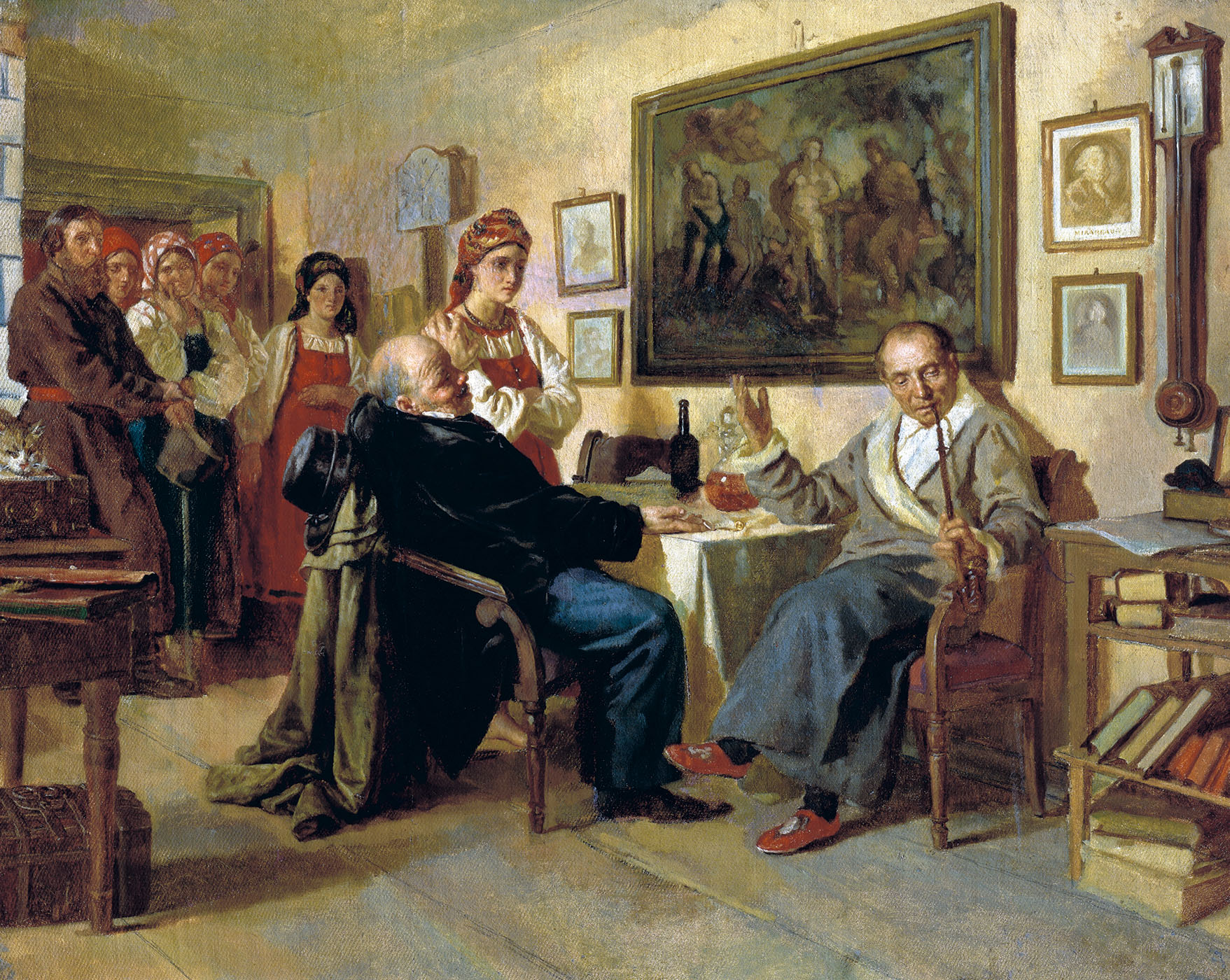
The Bargain, by Nikolai Nevrev (1866), depicting two landowners haggling over the price of a serf girl

Serfs in Russia fulfilled their obligations via obrok and barshchina. The former was a monetary payment of some sort, while the latter was a form of corvée labor, often three days a week on the lord's land. Obrok was more common in northern and central Russia, which were overall less fertile and where as such peasant incomes were typically supplemented with seasonal urban work and cottage industry. Basrschina was more common in the fertile south and west, which enabled a life fully on the fields. Siberia, due to its distance and climate, never saw widespread establishment of serf labor as an institution.

The oppression of the Russian serfdom led to frequent resistance, with peasant revolts remaining common in Russian history. The most notorious of these was the revolt in the 1770s led by Yemelyan Pugachev, a peasant leader who claimed to be the overthrown Peter III, husband of the then Tsar Catherine the Great. Pugachev alleged that Peter III had been overthrown since he was planning on liberating the serfs, leading to the Russian nobility conspiring to depose him and install Catherine on the throne. Such a tactic was not new in Tsarist history, with many of the False Dmitries, who claimed to be the assassinated Tsarevich, Dmitry of Uglich, during the Time of Troubles also utilizing similar narratives, with that particular period seeing widespread serf revolts such as the Uprising of Bolotnikov. In fact, Pugachev was not even the only impersonator of Peter III. This was often predicated on the belief that the Tsars themselves were not actually responsible for their misgivings and were actually attempting to aid them, but that the nobility were conspiring to impede their efforts; this belief has become known as the "Good tsar, bad boyars" phenomenon and has become a byword for attempting to ascribe blame not onto a central person by their associates. Serfs also resisted via arson, feigning illness, fleeing, and deliberate sabotage.

By the 19th century, serfdom was becoming a greater drag on Russia as a whole. Under the Tsar Alexander II, a period of reform began, hallmarked by the serf's emancipation in 1861. Although the peasantry were now free, they were still left in a precarious predicament; to compensate the nobility, the resulting land agreements were unfavorable to them and had to spend the next four decades paying their ex-lords. The Russian peasantry's liberation nonetheless helped stimulate Russia's industrialization and urbanization, however, they continued to make up the majority of the population for the remainder of Tsarist Russia's existence, and remained desperately impoverished. Marxism gained currency among many of them as a result, helping to contribute to the Russian Revolution.

==== Russian clergy ====
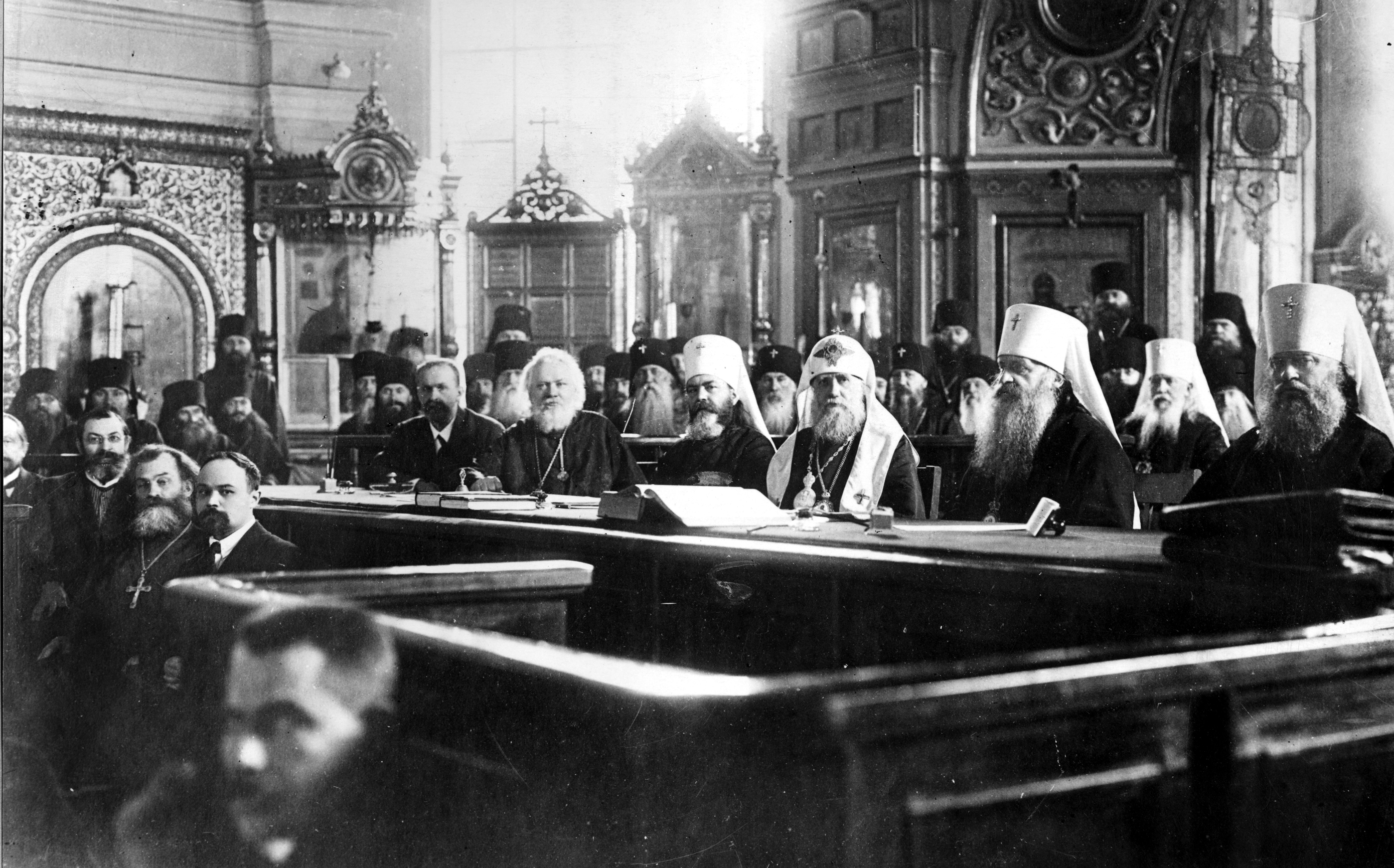
Highest authority of Russian Orthodox Church in 1917

Strata-wise, the Russian clergy consisted of two groups. There were parish clergy, who formed a de facto hereditary class, being able to marry and their sons being expected to go into the clergy. These individuals were generally poor and lacking in sophisticated religious education, being closer to the peasantry than the upper clergy, which consisted of monastic individuals where the bishop class was drawn from. They were substantial landowners, celibate, and wealthy, at least before Peter the Great. Parish and monastic clergy were also classified as white and black clergy respectively.

During the Petrine era, the autonomy of the Russian Orthodox Church was terminated, and it subsequentially became a stooge of the Tsarist state. Clergymen during this era in many ways became state religious figures, with the Russian Patriarchate being abolished and replaced by the governmental Holy Synod. Despite this, clergymen remained an important part of Russian cultural life, though the Patriarchate would not be reestablished until shortly after the end of Tsarist Russia in November 1917, with the election of Metropolitan Tikhon.

==== The Urban middle classes and Intelligentsia ====
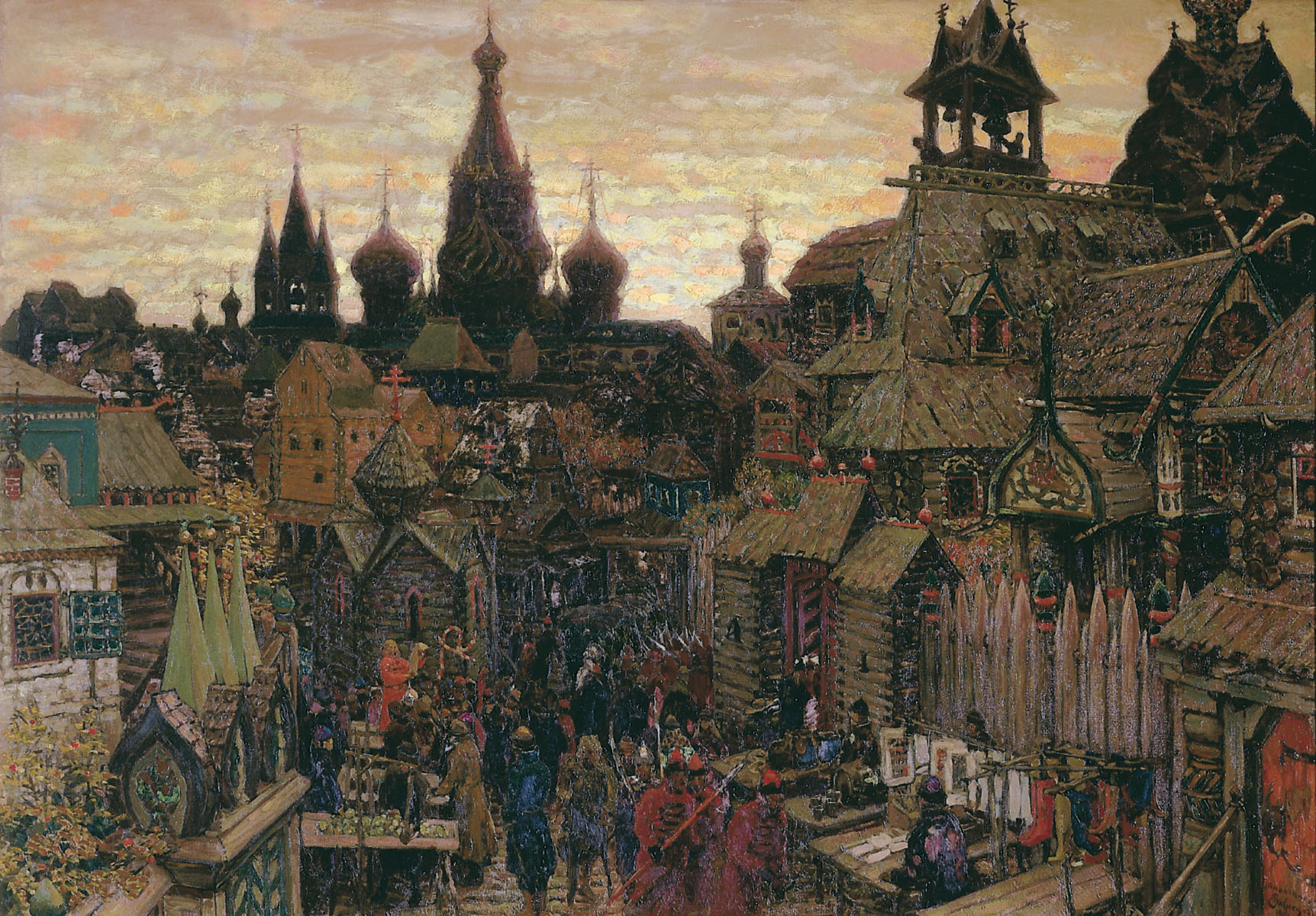
Street in Kitay-Gorod. The beginning of the XVII century, 1900, by Apollinary Vasnetsov, showing a marketplace in Tsardom-era Moscow

Unlike Western Europe, which saw the proliferation of a strong urban middle class during this era, the Russian equivalent faltered in comparison for most of this era. Although the cities of the Kievan Rus were highly prominent and prosperous, under the Tatar Yoke and the growth of serfdom, Russian cities shrunk in importance. The Russian merchantry, or kupechestvo, existed as a legally defined class with its own guild structure, but was heavily marginalized and stigmatized by Russian society and the government. The kupechestvo lacked real political power, unlike Western European merchantry, and although reforms under Peter and Catherine the Great attempted to rejuvenate their strength to boost commercial activity, their social prestige remained low compared to the Russian nobility, with successful merchants often attempting to utilize their wealth to acquire noble status and shift away from trade.

The 19th century saw the Russian intelligentsia emerge, or a class defined primarily by their education, dejection over the Russian order, and critical consciousness. They were largely sourced from the nobility and the raznochintsy, or people of miscellaneous rank. Throughout Tsarist Russia's final century, they were the primary force behind both liberal and radical politics in the empire, characterizing many of the sociopolitical disputes of the late Russian Empire such as the Slavophile-Westernization debate or the rise of Communism.

As industrialization kicked in the empire in the late 19th century, a new class of bourgeoise factory owners, managers, doctors, lawyers, and engineers emerged. They were largely centered in Moscow and Saint Petersburg, which still today serve as Russia's economic hubs. They had political say in the Duma through parties such as the Octobrists and Kadets, but proved too poorly organized to stabilize the Russian political system before the revolution of 1917.

==== The Industrial working classes ====
Factory workers' dormitory, c. 1900; such conditions created political unrest

The industrialization of the 19th century, much like elsewhere in the world, compounded by the abolition of serfdom, resulted in an influx of workers to the cities, as the free serfs and other migrants came to the urban areas to pick up industrial work. They concentrated in a select few regions; Moscow, Saint Petersburg, and the Donbass being a few; compounded with their poor working conditions and legal inability to collectively organize, this made them highly susceptible to political radicalization. They swiftly became the primary base for the Russian left, particularly Marxists.

Factory strikes were a persistent feature of the late Empire period, with multiple strike waves gripping Tsarist Russia, especially during the revolutionary tumult of 1905 and 1917. Pyotr Stolypin and Sergei Witte attempted to mitigate these with their reforms during their tenures in the final days of the state. They were moderately successful; ultimately however, it proved to be too little to prevent the eventual radical wave that toppled Tsarist Russia.

==== Cossacks ====
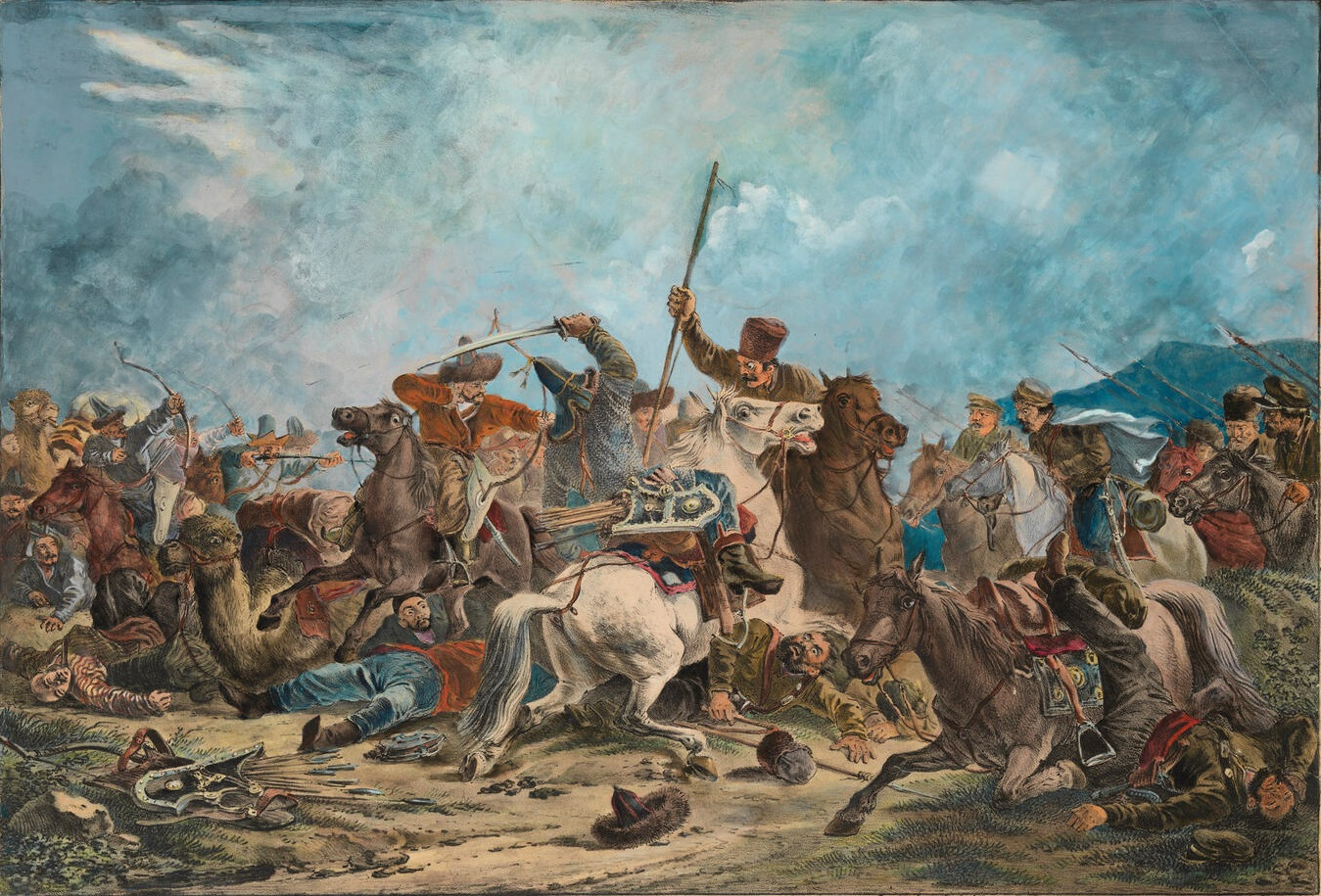
Ural Cossacks engaging with the Kazakhs, 19th century

Serfs in Russia chafed under their system of oppression, and lashed out in many cases. The Razin revolt and the Bulavin Rebellion at the turn of the 18th century were such instances. The second serfdom had led to individuals in Eastern Europe, from Ruthenia, Russia, and the Commonwealth fleeing to the Pontic Steppe in search of freedom, forming what would become known as the Cossacks. The Cossacks were a motley crew of people, consisting of fleeing serfs, escaped criminals, decommissioned soldiery, poor nobility, and even members of the tribes of the Steppe who had converted to Eastern Orthodoxy. Cossack communities developed all over the so-called Wild Fields, where they were proud of their free status; the term Cossack is derived from the Turkic kazak, meaning "free man". (Note: It is etymologically related to the term Kazakh, which is why pre-20th century Russian literature referred to Kazakhs as Kyrgyzs, especially since the Russian word for Cossacks (казак, kazak) is even more linguistically similar) They developed their own military culture, organizational structures, dialects, customs, and strong collective identity centered on martial values, personal freedom, Orthodox Christianity, and fierce egalitarianism within the community; decisions were made by the rada, and elected leaders (atamans and hetmans).

The democratic governance of the Cossacks put them at odds to a degree with the Tsarist state, however, both sides did find uses for one another. Early Tsaro-Cossack relations saw genuine reciprocity, with the Russian government viewing the Cossacks as useful auxiliary guards in the frontier, while the Cossacks liked the state assistance they would get without surrendering their independence. The Cossacks helped spearhead many of Russia's frontier conquests during this time, primarily in Siberia, often with little state intervention. The 17th century saw a shift in the dynamic. As the Cossacks had settled on the Steppe, they had formed a number of polities, called hosts and siches. The principal one, the Zaporozhian Sich, rebelled against Commonwealth authority under their hetman, Bohdan Khmelnytsky, who established the quasi-independent Cossack Hetmanate. Seeking Russian aid, they signed an agreement with Russia in 1654—the Pereiaslav Agreement—in which the latter became the suzerain of the former. As the Zaporizhian Cossacks were a major part of the ethnogenesis of the Ukrainians, the exact nature of this agreement—whether this amounted to a formal and fully consensual union with Russia as stated in Russian historiography or a temporary alliance made out of pragmatism as outlined in Ukrainian historiography—remains debated; but generally, this saw in practice Left-bank Ukraine under increasing Russian control. The Don Cossacks in this area gradually lost more and more autonomy under Tsarist rule for the remainder of the 17th century, resulting in several revolts, such as those led by Stenka Razin and Kondraty Bulavin. They were brutally crushed, and by the end of the 18th century, Cossack autonomy had disappeared.

From the late 18th century onwards, Cossacks and their hosts were integrated as a specialized hereditary class. Service became compulsory, with all male Cossacks being required to provide their own horses and equipment and to serve a specified term, typically around twenty years spread across active service and reserve obligations. In exchange, Cossack communities retained substantial land grants (stanichnye zemli), exemption from the standard conscription system, and a degree of internal self-governance through their host administrations. As such, Cossacks were an important part of the Imperial Russian Army. They were also employed in internal security, which brought some internal ire; they were extensively used to crack down on various demonstrations, revolts, and strikes, which gradually transformed their reputation from being romantic freedom fighters to instruments of Tsarist violence; in the Russian Civil War and early Soviet period, the Bolsheviks adopted a policy of De-Cossackization, which amounted effectively to a mass genocide campaign.

==== Other classes ====
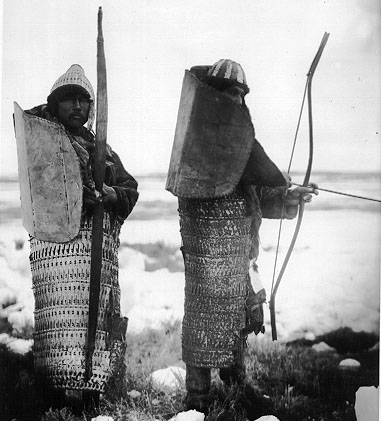
Lamellar armor traditionally worn by the Koryak people (circa 1900)

The meshchane were the legally defined lower urban estate, being above the peasantry and below the merchant guilds. They consisted of small tradesmen, artisans, petty shopkeepers, and urban workers who were registered in a town but unable to qualify for membership in the guilds. Membership in this class was hereditary and people in it were subject to poll tax and conscription. They were initially essentially the Russian equivalent of Western European petty bourgeoisie, though as usual with less legal and political weight. As the Russian Empire industrialized, the lines between the industrial working class and the lower reaches of the merchantry became increasingly blurred. At the time of the 1897 census, the meshchane were the largest defined urban estate, numbering at 13 million, but many of them lived in conditions not too dissimilar from that of the rural peasantry.

The raznochintsy, or people of various ranks, were an eponymous miscellaneous estate consisting of all educated people outside the clergy and nobility who did not fit in to any established estate category. This included the sons of merchants, lesser clergymen, minor officials, and even emancipated serfs who attained education. Its from this class that many of the Russian intelligentsia came from starting from the 1860s onwards, who chafed under current system and had less stake in it despite their education, helping to contribute to the radicalization of Russian politics in its final years.

Amongst the peoples of Siberia, a variety of differing development levels existed, with some being semi-sedentary agricultural folk and others being nomadic hunter-gatherers. Government policy towards the Siberian indigenes was oriented around the yasak system, where furs were paid as tribute to the Russian state; beyond that, the Tsarist state meddled little in the affairs of the Siberians. Violence and disease were common during the conquest. The 1822 Statute on the Administration of Siberian Peoples, drafted by the reformist administrator Mikhail Speransky, was the most comprehensive attempt to regularize the legal position of indigenous Siberians. It divided them into three categories: sedentary, nomadic, and wandering, with differing administrative arrangements for each; it also terminated the worst abused of the yasak system. In practice, exploitation by traders and local officials persisted, with the late 19th century seeing increasing pressure from Russian settlers on native Siberian land; nevertheless, their situation differed from that of Central Asia and the Caucasus in the relative absence of organized military resistance and lessened Russification efforts due to the minuscule population.

== Territory ==
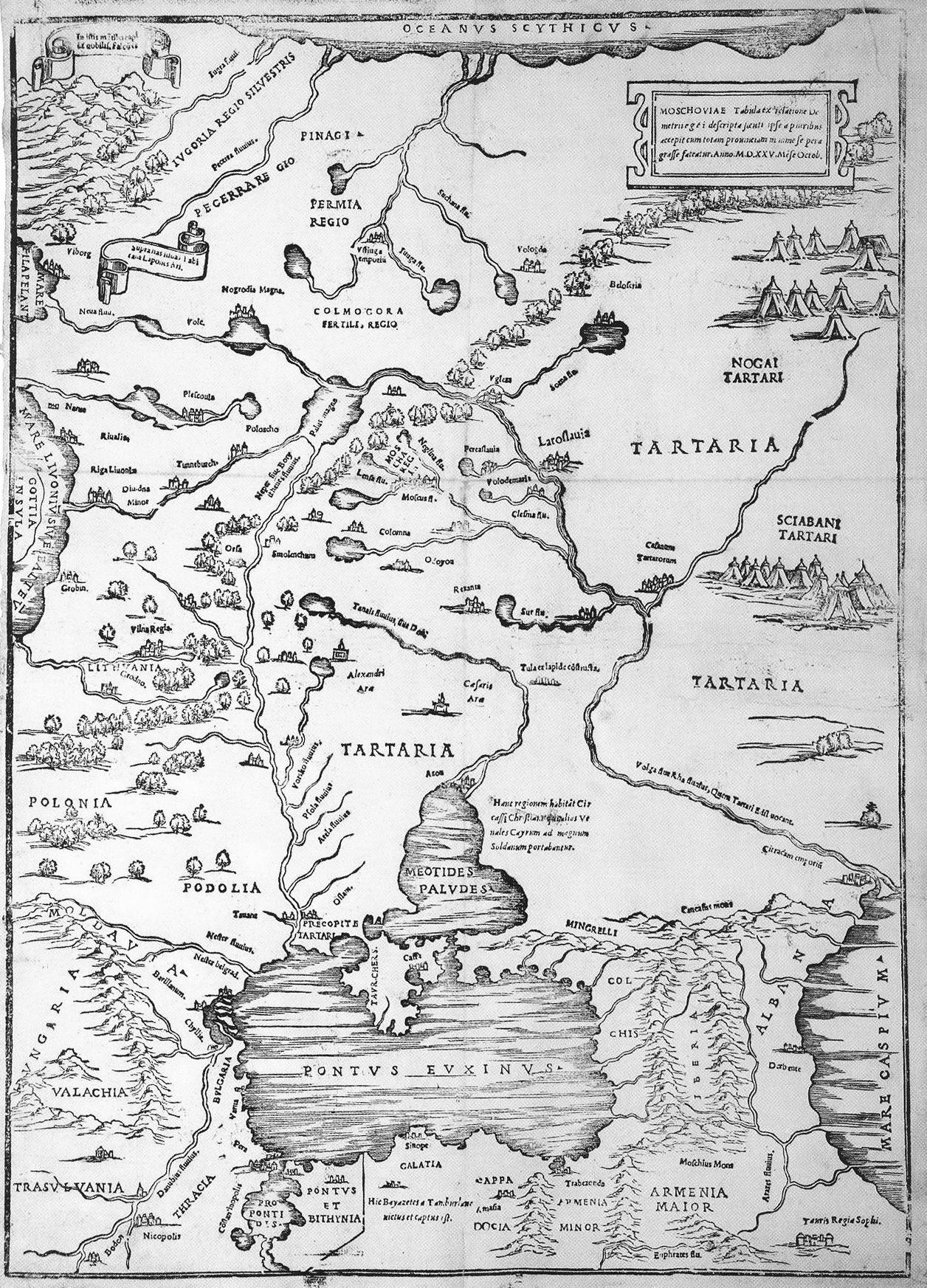
1525 map of Muscovy by the Genoese cartographer Battista Agnese

English cartographer Robert Morden's 1695 map of the Tsardom of Russia

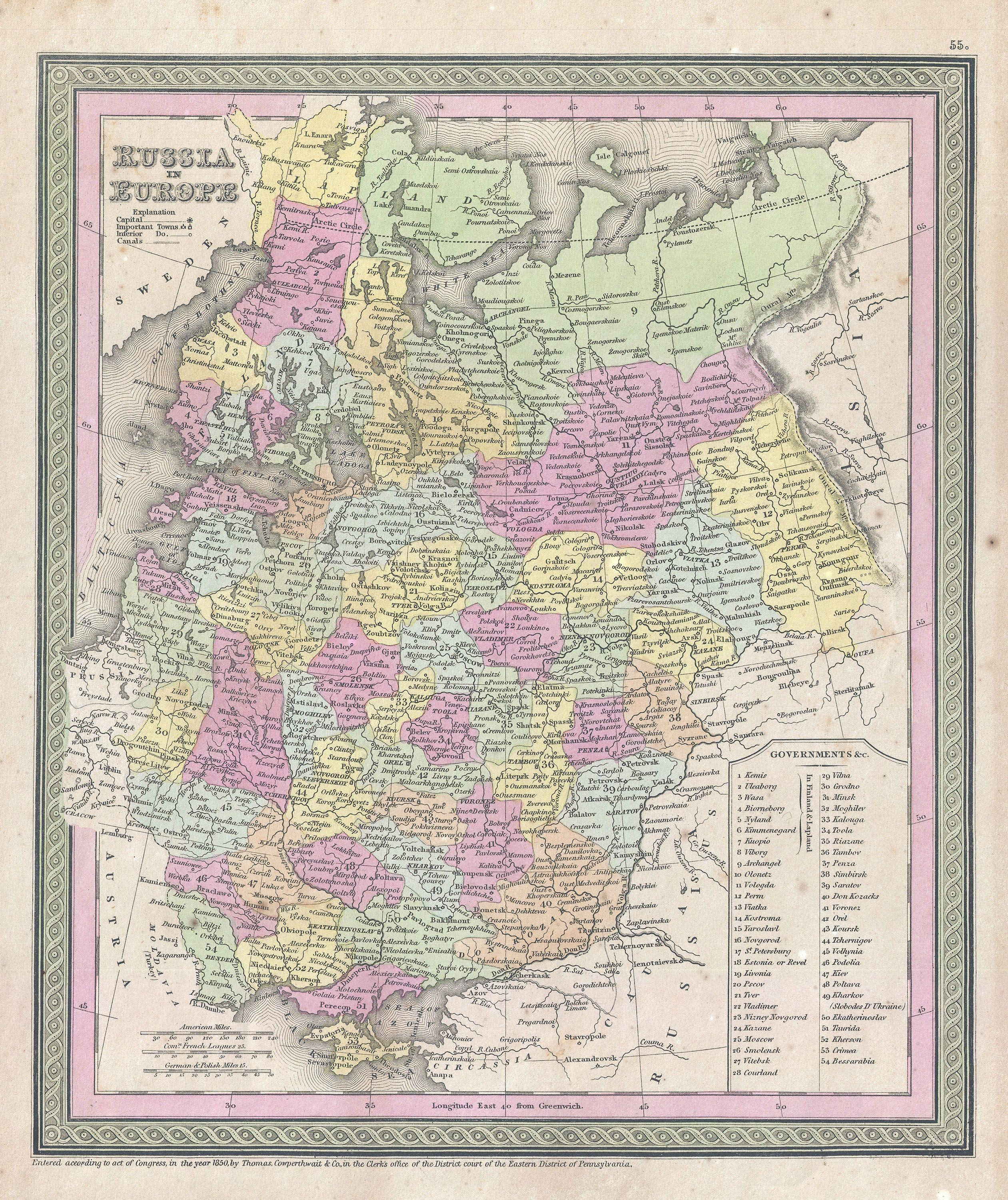
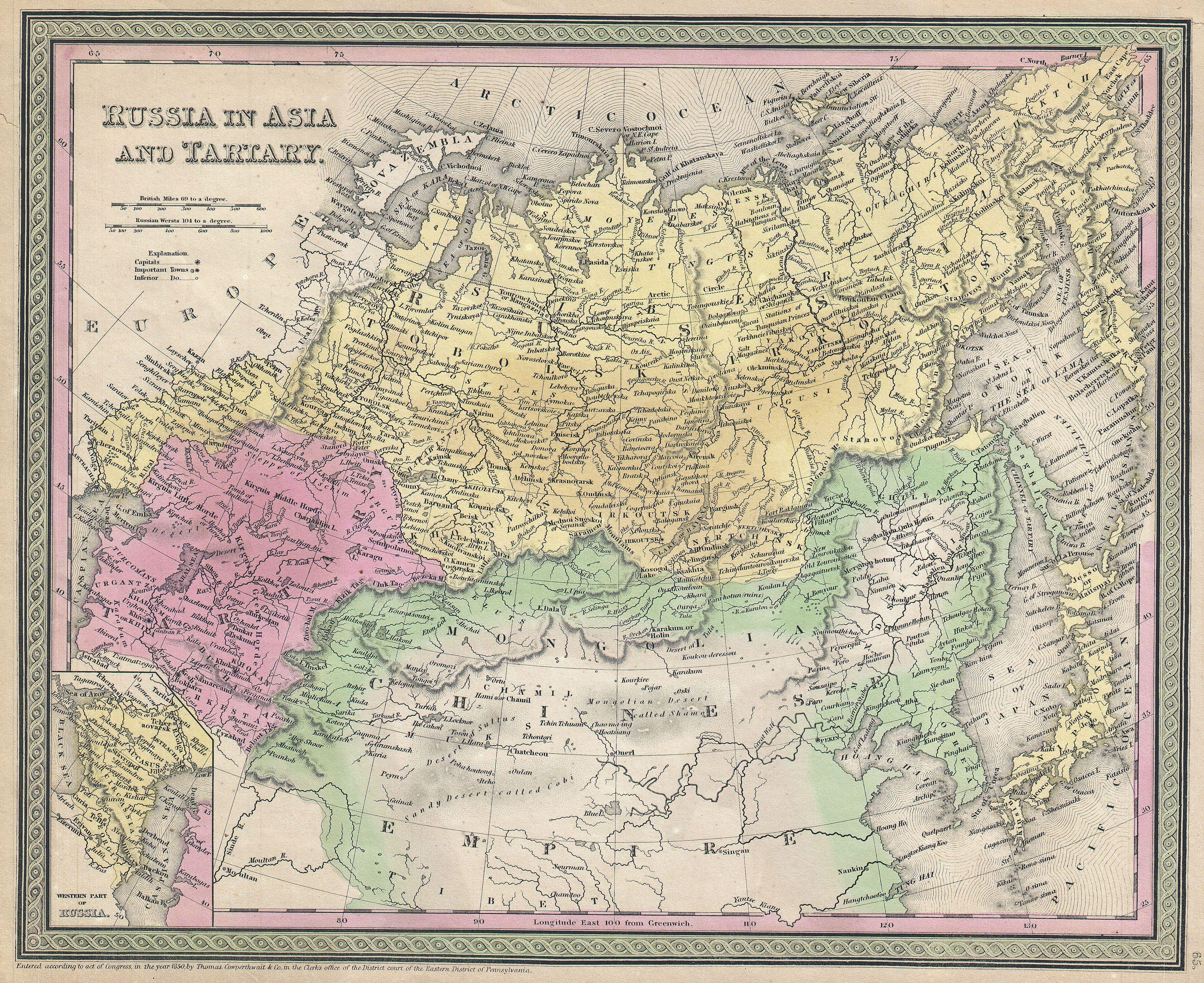
European Russia and Asio-Tartar Russia respectively, by the American cartographer Samuel Augustus Mitchell, 1853

The period of Tsars coincided with the expansion of Russia from a large, but peripheral domain on the fringes of the European continent to a transcontinental realm that was the largest country on Earth. At its territorial peak in 1866, Tsarist Russia encompassed 8.8 million sq mi (23 million km^{2}), spanned three continents—Europe, Asia, and North America—and was (and remains) the second-largest contiguous empire in history, behind only the Mongols; at the time, it was also flatly the second largest empire, behind the British. From 1533 to 1796, the state grew by an average of around 52 thousand km^{2} (20 thousand sq mi).

In its final form, Tsarist Russia stretched from the eastern fringes of the North European Plain to the Bering Sea. It was bounded to the north by the Arctic and to the south by the Black and Caspian Seas, the southern fringes of the Caucasus and Central Asia, and the steppe frontiers of Mongolia and Manchuria. In Europe, it consistently bordered Sweden, the Poles and Lithuanians, the Ottomans, Germany, and Romania. In Asia, they bordered various Central Asian and Caucasian polities that after years of conquest resulted in a border with Persia, as well as Afghanistan and briefly British India. Through their expansion westwards, they bordered China, and also had a border with British North America.

Tsarist Russia was legally one indivisible state; i.e., a unitary state. The Grand Duchy of Finland, as well as the Kingdom of Poland were considered part of this indivisible realm. Early on in the history of the Muscovite Princedom, appanages were common, though already by the time of Ivan the Great, this system was on the way out as Muscovy consolidated together to form Russia, being dismantled formally by the first Tsar, Ivan the Terrible.

The empire was largely contiguous, save for their holdings in Alaska. This made it unique amongst the contemporary European powers; while most such as Britain, France, Germany, Spain, and Portugal, had large colonial possessions that often constituted the bulk of their territory, Russia's possessions were an integral part of its territory; as such, while the other empires were subject to decolonization, the territory of Tsarist Russia would form the basis of the territory of the USSR and even after its collapse the territory of the contemporary Russian Federation.

In addition to the exclave Chinese concessions, the Russians also controlled the Chinese Eastern Railway, which linked Port Arthur with Vladivostok and Chita. In the 1810s, Georg Anton Schäffer, a German entrepreneur, attempted to get the nascent Kingdom of Hawaii annexed by the Russian Empire, going so far as to successfully negotiate protectorate status for the island realm, though Tsar Alexander I refused the offer. In 1888, a Cossack adventurer named Nikolay Ivanovitch Achinov attempted to conquer Sagallo in contemporary Djibouti as Russia's contribution to the ongoing Scramble for Africa, but his efforts were thwarted by the French, who considered Djibouti to be their area of control under the Berlin Conference.

== Religion and demography ==
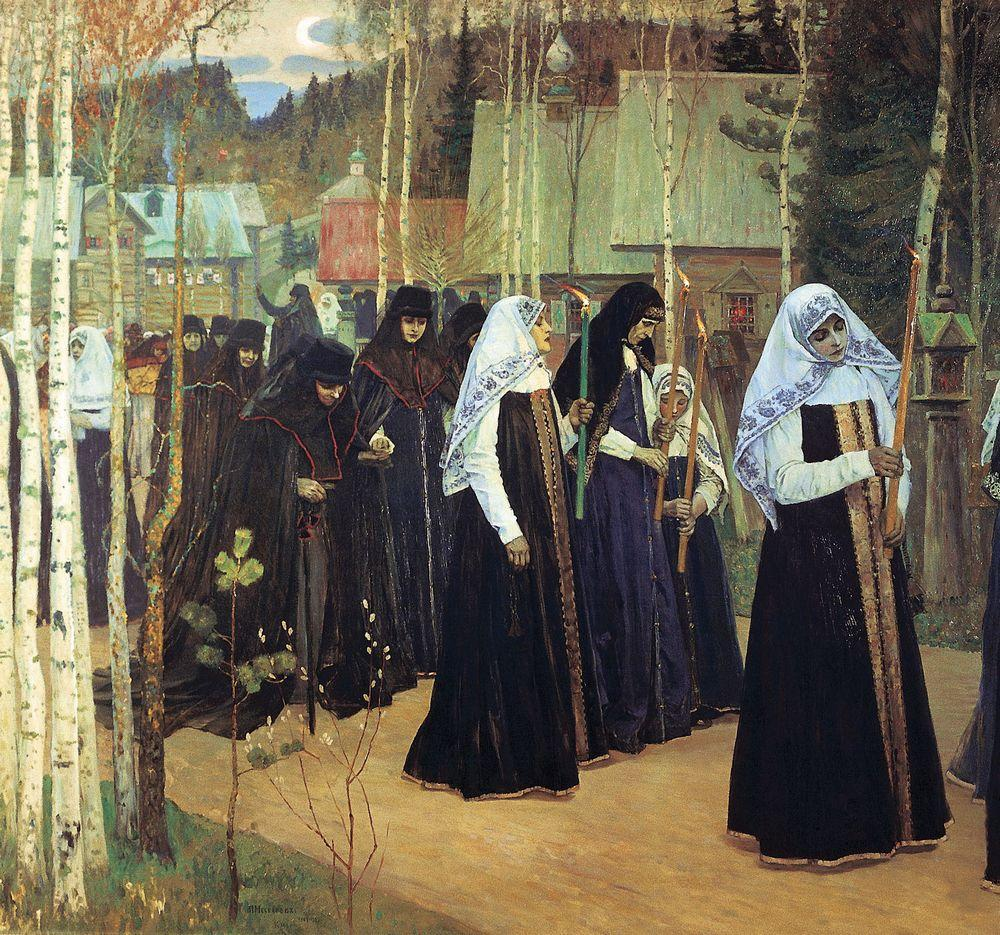
The Great Taking of the Veil, by Mikhail Nesterov (c. 1897)

From its inception, Tsarist Russia was an extremely diverse country, containing a multitude of religious and ethnic groups. Through interaction, migration, and conquest, Tsarist Russia grew to encompass a myriad of different peoples over its centuries-long history, w hich shaped its history. The relation between these groups and the Russian government varied. The Tsarist regime generally represented the Russians and the Orthodox Church, and sought throughout its history to assimilate the various groups of the empire into a coherent, Orthodox Russian populous. Especially during the Imperial era as the empire conquered more exterior territory and gained influence from the rising nationalist movement in Europe, religious and ethnic communities were increasingly marginalized as an Orthodox, Slavic nationalistic ideology gripped the country. Policies of forceful hard assimilation were promoted by successive Tsars, with varying degrees of effect. In some areas, such as Poland, this would prompt various rebellions against Russian rule, and in many areas would help promulgate various other nationalist movements.

=== Religion ===
Religion in Tsarist Russia during this period oriented around the fact that Eastern Orthodoxy was its state religion. The Russian Church and Tsarist state held a symbiotic relationship in which the former legitimized the latter's right to rule while the latter provided the former with resources, protection, and doctrinal enforcement. In the wake of the decline of the Byzantine Empire, the idea of Russia being the Third Rome gained currency, becoming state policy in the final years of the Grand Principality of Moscow. This was accompanied by an increase over time of state intervention into the church.

A major schism erupted in Russian society in the late 17th century following the rise of Patriarch Nikon to power, who implemented a series of controversial liturgical reforms that resulted in much political and even armed resistance. The process of autocratic control over the church culminated during the Petrine era, when Peter the Great abolished the Moscow Patriarchy, with it only being reestablished after the February Revolution. Until that point and from the reign of Peter onwards, the Church was effectively a stooge of the state, and became increasingly identified with the Tsarist autocracy, leading to anti-religious sentiment becoming popular amongst its detractors in its final years.

=== Ethnocultural divisions ===
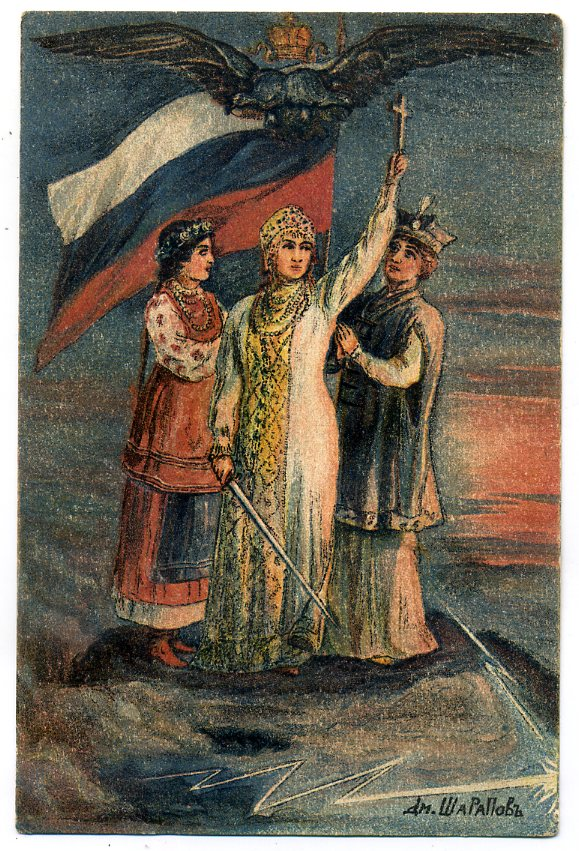
The All-Russian nation: Mother Russia, representing (Great) Russians, flanked by personifications of Belarusians (White Russians) and Ukrainians (Little Russians), respectively, who look towards her as she leads them under the Russian flag and eagle

Tsarist Russia was a diverse place, with a multitude of different ethnic groups. In the 1897 census, ethnic Russians made up 44% of the empire, a plurality, but not a majority. Compounded with the Ruthenians (Ukrainians and Belarusians, who made up 18% and 4% respectively), East Slavs made up around 68% of the empire's population. The Russians, Ukrainians, Poles, and Belarusians, were the largest ethnic groups at that point.

Attitudes to fellow Slavs varied wildly amongst the Tsarist state. Internationally, it propped itself as the defender of the wider Slavic community, being for large parts of its history the preeminent and even sometimes only independent Slavic state. This big brother narrative gained popularity amongst the South and non-Polish West Slavs, who in the 19th century began to undergo their national awakenings and campaign for independence against the Habsburgs and the Ottomans; the Russians invested and backed these efforts under a Panslavic ideological framework. The Panslavic colors became based on the colors of the Russian flag in homage to this, being featured on most Slavic states' flags.

However, when it came to the fellow Slavs living in Tsarist Russia, they were subject to institutionalized oppression and Russification. As the primary enemy of Russia during the Tsardom, with their occupation of Moscow in the early 17th century still remembered, many Russians believed that they and the Poles were locked into an external struggle, with a proud and independent Polish nation signaling the end of Russia. The Russians also viewed the Poles as corrupted by their longstanding integration with the west and doubted that they, as Catholics, would ever truly submit to an Orthodox monarchy.

Poles were also blamed for severing Ukrainians and Belarusians apart from Russia and making them believe they were separate peoples. The East Slavs, or Rus, formerly united even during the days of the Tatar Yoke, were separated by the Lithuanian campaigns in Ruthenia in the Late Middle Ages, which the Poles aided; the areas that they conquered would undergo linguistic and cultural divergences that resulted in the ethnogenesis of Ukrainians and Belarusians. The Russians maintained, under the idea of a triune of Russians, that the Ukrainians (Little Russians) and Belarusians (White Russians) were subgroups of a greater Russian ethnic group, of which the (Great) Russians were also a part of. This idea began to be formulated by the remaining Orthodox clergy of Ukraine after the Ukrainian Cossacks submitted to the Russian Tsar in 1654, an event that would later be commemorated in Russia as the reunification of it and Ukraine, with the 1674 Kievan Synopsis serving to justify it under this lense. The narrative would become more used as the Russians seized the lion's share of the Polish–Lithuanian Commonwealth in the late 18th century, absorbing most of the Ruthenians. (Note: Save for the remaining Ukrainians in Austrian Galicia and Rusyns in Transcarpathia)

Under Russian rule, Ukraine and Belarus underwent extensive Russification campaigns, however, they failed to extinguish their local identities; in fact, both Ukraine and Belarus underwent a national reawakening under the Russian Empire, and Ukrainians and Belarusians (recorded as Little and White Russians respectively) still made up nearly a quarter of Tsarist Russia's population according to the 1897 census. Despite this, the degree of cultural similarity and historical ties of the Rus people did make the issue a contentious one in Ruthenia, with many Ruthenians arguing that they were indeed core, but distinct parts of the Russian ethnicity, arguing against full-fledged independence and instead for negotiated autonomy. As Russification efforts intensified, popular opinion in Ruthenia turned against the Tsars, with many Belarusians aiding the Poles in their 1863 uprising. In the aftermath of the revolt, a fresh wave of Russificatory policies emerged, most famously the Ems decree by Alexander II, which largely banned the publication of Ukrainian; similar effective bans were placed on Belarusian for most of the 19th century, which furthered the rise of Ruthenian nationalism. Russia's failure in World War I prompted a major turning point in Ukrainian and Belarusian nationalism, as the ineffectiveness of the Tsarist and later successive revolutionary governments helped shift the narrative firmly towards independence, with both peoples establishing brief periods of statehood, (Note: see Ukraine after the Russian Revolution and Belarusian People's Republic) however, they were eventually reabsorbed by the forces of the Russian-based Bolsheviks into the Soviet Union; although constituted as a separate republic from Russia, they would only gain independence in 1991.

The non-Slavs of Tsarist Russia, often called inorodtsy, were administered under various local agreements. These included the Finns, Balts, Estonians, Jews, Tatars, Caucasian peoples, Central Asians, and Siberians, among others. These agreements arranged from being granted decent autonomy such as Finland to being under direct Tsarist control. The contrast between the Russian Tsarist centralization and the multiethnic character of the state was a key tension in Tsarist Russia, one the culminated in the various ethnic wars that engulfed it after its death during the Russian Civil War.

=== Demographics ===
Censi in Tsarist Russia were conducted on a large sporadic and local basis. However, these were rarely at a national level; Tsarist Russia had only one empire-wide census, that of 1897. First proposed in the 1870s, it was approved by Tsar Nicholas II in 1895 and its findings were published from 1898 to 1905 via Hollerith card machines. The total population of the Russian Empire was recorded at 125,640,021. The census analyzed the religious demographics of the empire, which were as follows:

Faith	Number	%
Eastern Orthodox	87,123,604	69.34
Muslim	13,906,972	11.07
Roman Catholic	11,467,994	9.13
Rabbinic Jewish	5,215,805	4.15
Lutherans	3,572,653	2.84
Old Believers	2,204,596	1.75
Armenian Apostolic	1,179,241	0.94
Buddhists	433,863	0.34
Reformed	85,400	0.07
Mennonite	66,564	0.05
Armenian Catholic	38,840	0.03
Baptist	38,139	0.03
Karaite Jewish	12,894	0.01
Anglican	4,183	0.00
Other Christian denominations	3,952	0.00
Other non-Christian denominations	285,321	0.23
TOTAL	125,640,021	100.00

The census did not officially analyze ethnicity, instead only analyzing languages spoken. Nevertheless, these offer insights into the ethnography of the Russian Empire and function as the closest government record of it. Under the ideology of the Triune Russia, Russian is labeled as Great Russian, Ukrainian as Little Russian, and Belarusian as White Russian. The following are the records for the twenty five most spoken languages in Tsarist Russia at the time.

Language	Native speakers	%
Great Russian (Note: Termed as Russians: Great Russian (Великорусский). Today known as Russian.)	55,667,469	44.31
Little Russian (Note: Termed as Russians: Little Russian (Малорусский). Today known as Ukrainian.)	22,380,551	17.81
Polish	7,931,307	6.31
White Russian (Note: Termed as Russians: White Russian (Белорусский). Today known as Belarusian.)	5,885,547	4.68
Jewish	5,063,156	4.03
Kyrgyz-Kaisak (Note: Kazakh, Karakalpak and some other smaller Central Asian languages grouped together)	4,084,139	3.25
Tatar (Note: Incorporates many Tatar and Turkic speaking nationalities, such as Crimean Tatar, Volga Tatar, Siberian Tatar, Azerbaijani, Balkar, Altaian, Khakas and others.)	3,737,627	2.97
German	1,790,489	1.43
Latvian	1,435,937	1.14
Bashkir	1,321,363	1.05
Lithuanian	1,210,510	0.96
Armenian	1,173,096	0.93
Moldovan (Note: The overwhelming part was Moldovan, the Romanian though seen as an apart language, was counted together with the Moldovan.)	1,121,669	0.89
Mordovian	1,023,841	0.81
Estonian	1,002,738	0.80
Sartic	968,655	0.77
Chuvash	843,755	0.67
Georgian	823,968	0.66
Uzbek	726,534	0.58
Samogitian	448,022	0.36
Other Turkic dialects	440,412	0.35
Votyak	420,970	0.34
Mari	375,439	0.30
Tajik	350,397	0.28
Buryat	288,663	0.23

There is evidence of governmental tampering with the official numbers; the number of Russian speakers was possibly overstated, while the number of Polish speakers downplayed. Plans for another census existed as far back as 1908, but the imperial treasury struggled to fund the endeavor. A second general census was finally scheduled for December 1915, but World War I led to its indefinite postponement, and the collapse of the empire in 1917 meant that no nationwide general census would be carried out until the 1926 Soviet census.

== Economy ==
The city of Novgorod, seized by Muscovy in 1478, was one of Russia's most important trading cities until its destruction by Ivan the Terrible in 1570.

Throughout the Tsarist era; from the Muscovite period to the Tsardom era, to the Empire, the Russian economy was unique amongst European polities for how much the state was involved in the economy. Under the Grand Princes, there was little distinction between princely and state property, and the Grand Prince, particularly as the Tsarist model of governance was developed under Ivan III and his successors, began amassing extensive control of the Muscovite economy. Through state monopolies, state-sponsored manufacturing and trading initiatives, the frequent direction of modernization efforts by the Tsars or their high-ranking ministers, or serf-funded military estates, there was rarely an aspect of Russian economic life where the state acted as a passive player. Likely inherited in part from the Mongols, whose economic micromanagement contrasted with that of the East Slavs under the Kyivan Rus, the degree to which state intervention in the economy was so normalized in Russian society is often held up as enabling the popularity of Marxist ideologies around the turn of the century, enabling the Bolshevik takeover of Russia in 1917 and culminating in the Soviet Union. The large degree of state control in the economy prevented the development of free-market capitalism or any seriously independent economic force, which, compounded with the longstanding communal history of Russia via the mir system, made the Marxist ideas of state-run enterprises and collective ownership more palatable to many in Russia.

== Military ==
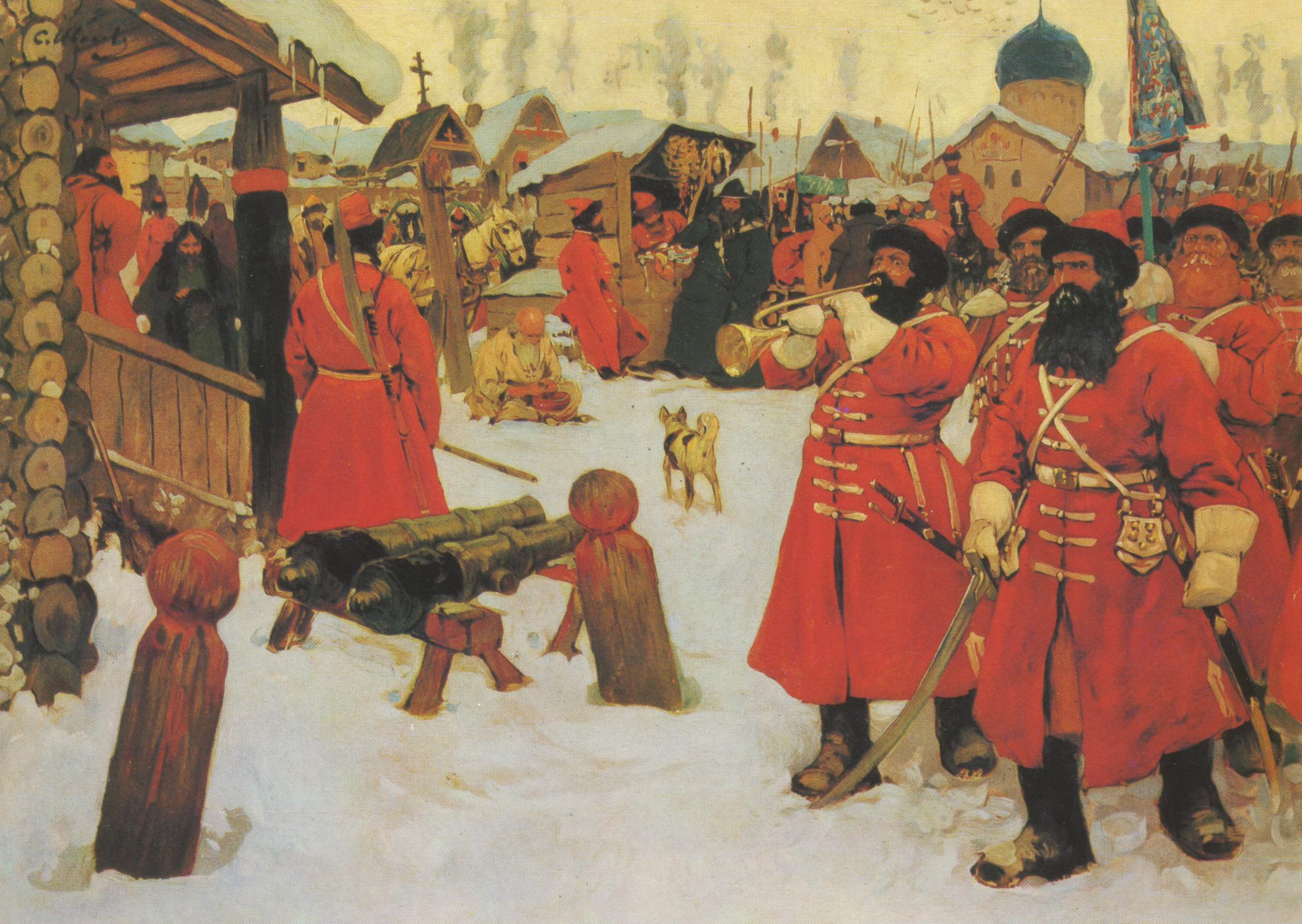
Painting of the streltsy by Sergey Ivanov, 1908

The military of Tsarist Russia evolved from the armies of the Rus' principalities that gradually emerged with the disintegration of the Kyivan Rus and the Mongol conquest. As the Rus principalities gained independence, the united armed forces of the Kyivan Rus gave way to personal forces of the various princes. Under Ivan III in the late 15th century, an entirely aristocratic army, known as the Landed Army, was formed for the Grand Principality of Moscow in 1482. The creation of the Landed Army was part of a broader process of centralization of the military that accompanied the wider centralization of Russia during this era. Prior to Ivan III, the Muscovite military primarily consisted of disorganized peasant levies, and the Grand Prince was unable to compel the subordinate princes to directly place their armies under him, only the ability to call them to arms. The shift began under Ivan III's predecessor, Vasily II, during the Muscovite War of Succession in the early 15th century, and was largely finalized by Ivan III by the end of the century. Under the Tsardom era, the army consisted of various polks, or regiments, commanded by a voivode.

The 16th century saw the Military Revolution sweep Europe, making gunpowder and portable firearms integral parts of European armies. These changes came to Russia, where under Ivan the Terrible, it would become one of the gunpowder empires. Ivan the Terrible established the streltsy, or units equipped with firearms, sometime by 1550. They would go on to see frequent use as Russia was embroiled in a state of near permanent war for the rest of his reign. The streltsy were initially recruited from free tradesmen and the rural population. They were overseen primarily by the Streltsy Department. Despite being an elite force, the streltsy were poorly paid and treated, and they would often engage in rebellions against the government.

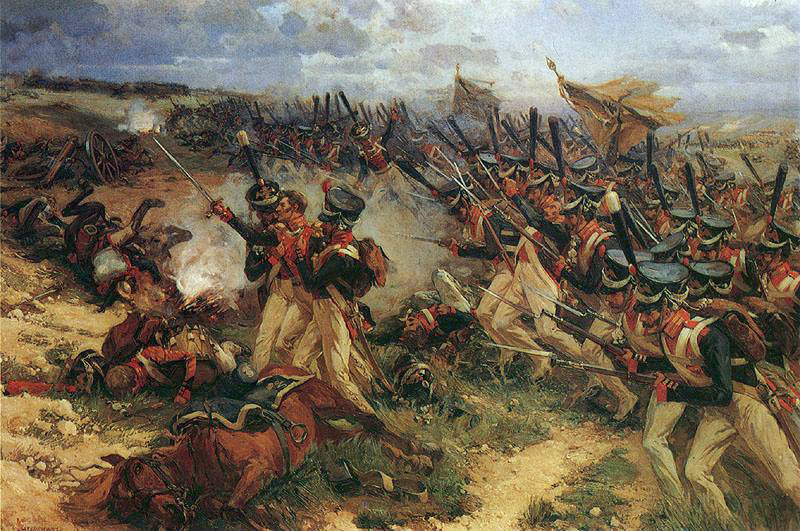
Russian Imperial Guard at Borodino. 1912 painting by Nikolai Samokish.

The 17th century would expose many weaknesses of the Tsarist army, prompting a process of westernization began under Tsar Alexis, who created the New Order Regiments. When Peter the Great came to power, the military began to be further reformed as part of the Petrine reforms. The last remnants of the Landed Army were disbanded by him, and he began to compose a new army from the New Order Regiments, Cossacks, streltsy, and zheldaks, incorporating the latest advancements in European militaries; knowledge partially attained from a private toy army he amassed as a child. The streltsy were gradually abolished by Peter the Great, especially after a revolt against him in 1698. He also established the modern Russian navy. Peter's military saw its first major test in the Great Northern War against Sweden,where after a few years of faliure, the Russians defeated the Swedes in 1709 and effectively forced them on the defensive for the remaining decade of the war. The military of the Russian Empire largely consisted of peasant conscripts, though starting in the 19th century, the navy preferred urban recruits for more technical roles. For most of the 18th century, service was for life; this was changed to 25 years in 1793 and gradually lessened in the years after the Napoleonic Wars, eventually coming down to twelve years of active service in 1855, plus three years in the reserve. The wars against Revolutionary and Imperial France around the turn of the 19th century compelled changes to the Russian military under the reformist new Tsar, Alexander I. He created the Ministries of War and the Navy in 1802, which aided in the management of the army and navy respectively. However, the Russian military still bore many of l'ancien régime like structures and tendencies that France's rejection of had contributed so much to its success on the field. Following the Napoleonic Wars, Tsar Nicholas I maintained the large imperial army to maintain Russia's position in Europe. However, Russia's defeat in the Crimean War promulgated new reforms under Tsar Alexander II, who delegated the effort to Count Dmitry Milyutin, the Minister of War.

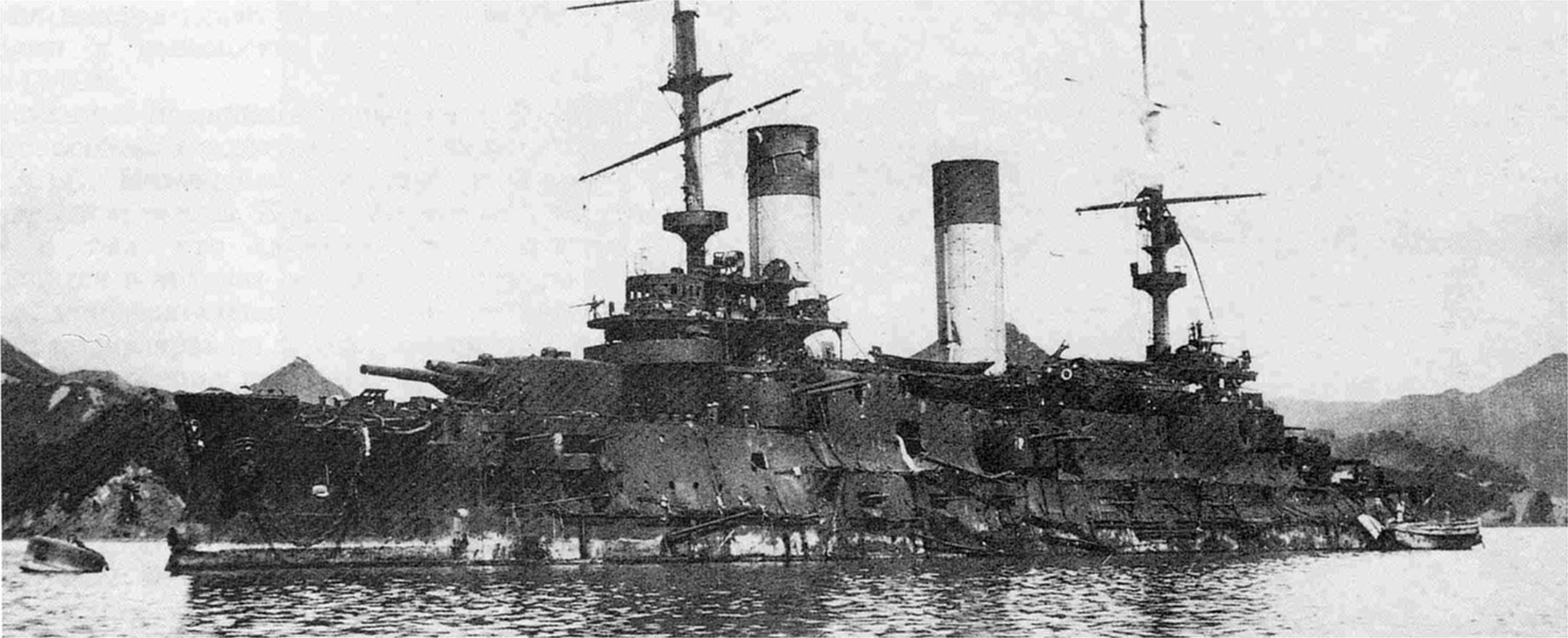
Damage to the battleship Oryol following the Battle of Tsushima

As Russia began to focus more on catching up with Europe socially and developmentally in the late 19th century, military spending declined as funding was diverted to civilian spending, paying off foreign loans, and building infrastructure. Aside from major conflicts such as the Russo-Turkish War in the 1870s, as well as the Boxer Revolt in China at the turn of the century, the Russian army spent most of the two decades following the ascension of Alexander III quashing around 1,500 protests as antagonism towards the Tsarist model grew, crushing morale. When Russia went to war with Japan in 1904, it suffered a humiliating defeat. As the First Russian Revolution gripped the country in response, many in the military began to mutiny, which helped prompt the October Manifesto. Even afterwards, between fall 1905 and summer 1906, there were around four hundred mutinies in the Russian army.

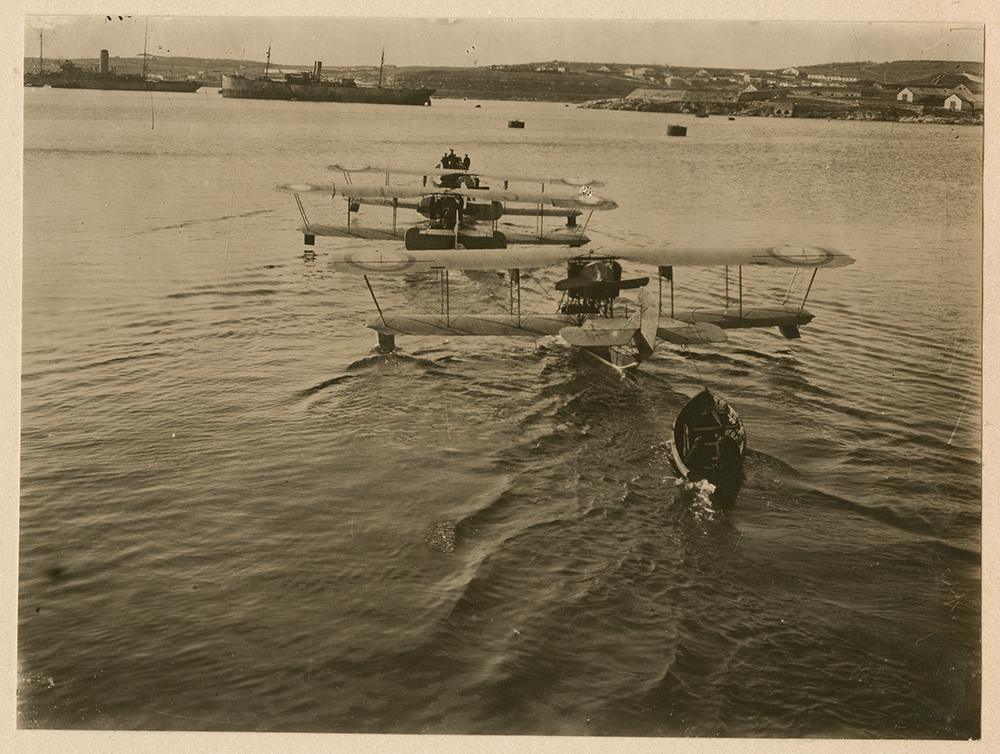
Grigorovich M-9s towing boats off the coast of Sevastopol

Russia fared poorly in World War I, and the Eastern Front saw massive losses for them and their allies. The army had severe tactical and operational issues when compared to the German Army (though it fared better against those of the other Central Powers), and the Russo-Japanese War had resulted in the Russian Navy slipping from being the third largest to sixth, with a rebuilding campaign being incomplete at the time of the July Crisis. In 1912, the same year the naval reconstitution started, the Imperial Russian Air Service was set up, and it saw limited action in the war. Eventually, the military defeats and poor conditions at the home front promulgated the Second Russian Revolution in 1917. In general, the Reds, as the eventual victors of the Russian Civil War, would take up most of the remnants of the Tsarist military, transforming them into the Soviet military.

== Symbology ==
Tsarist Russia utilized a multitude of national and governmental symbols. These were generally implemented top down by the Tsarist government. Many of these symbols are still used today in the Russian Federation.

=== Flags and armorial ===
==== Coat of Arms ====
Yaroslav the Wise of the Kievan Rus had Saint George be his patron saint; he was baptized as George. As such, he featured the saint on his seal. Many other Russian princes would go on to employ him in their symbols. Meanwhile, as early as 1390, a rider had appeared on the seal of Vasily I, the Grand Prince of Moscow. Under Ivan III, a dragon being pierced by a lance of this rider was added, which eventually evolved into the coat of arms of Moscow. The horseman was not identified with any particular figure, and remained so for centuries. Many artists depicted him as reigning Tsars. When Peter the Great came to power however around the turn of the 18th century, he began making a connection between the horseman and the story of Saint George slaying the dragon. This connection was made official by a decree in 1730 under Tsarina Anna.

As Muscovy continued expanding and consolidating under Ivan III, he sought to further his claim to being the successor of the fallen Byzantines and his title of tsar, and as such adopted the imperial double-headed eagle as early as 1472. Under Ivan the Terrible and founding of the Tsardom, the double-headed eagle and Saint George's slaying were combined to form a single coat of arms, with the latter serving as an escutcheon superimposed on the former. With the establishment of the Moscow Patriarchate in 1589, a patriarchal cross was added for a time between the heads of the eagle. Under the Romanovs in the early 17th century, three crowns, widely interpreted as representing the conquered kingdoms of Kazan, Astrakhan and Siberia, or the three All-Russian states of (Great) Russia, White Russia (Belarus) and Little Russia (Ukraine). Under Peter the Great, the collar of the Order of St. Andrew was added around the escutcheon and the crown was changed to mirror western crowns and eventually the new imperial crown. The eagle's color was also changed from golden to black. Under Nicholas I, a variant with the arms of Kazan, Astrakhan and Siberia on its left wing and those of Poland, Crimea, and Finland superimposed on the eagle's wings began to be used; later greater achievements would have more arms and have them surround the eagle instead.

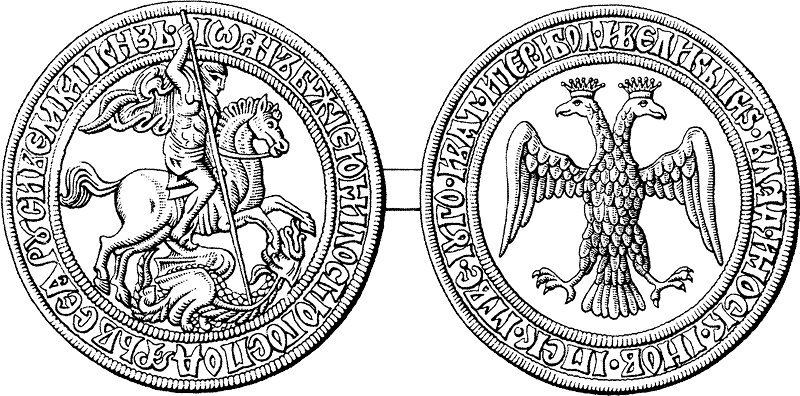
1472–1502: Seal of Ivan III

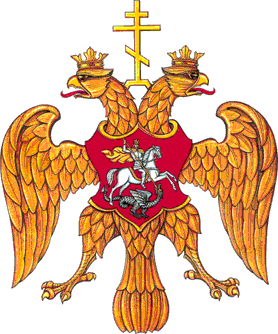
1584–1667: Coat of arms of the Tsardom of Russia

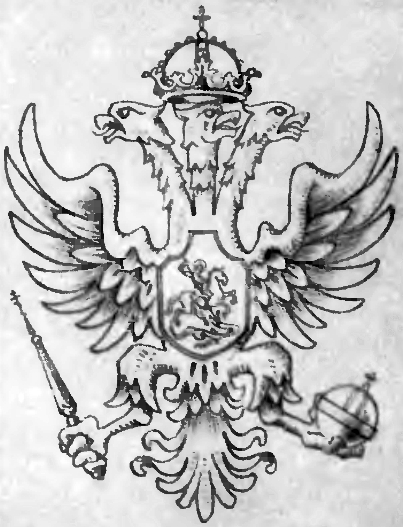
1654: Variant under Tsar Alexis (from the Pereiaslav Agreement)

1667–1721: Coat of arms of the Tsardom of Russia

1721–1725: Imperial coat of arms under Peter the Great

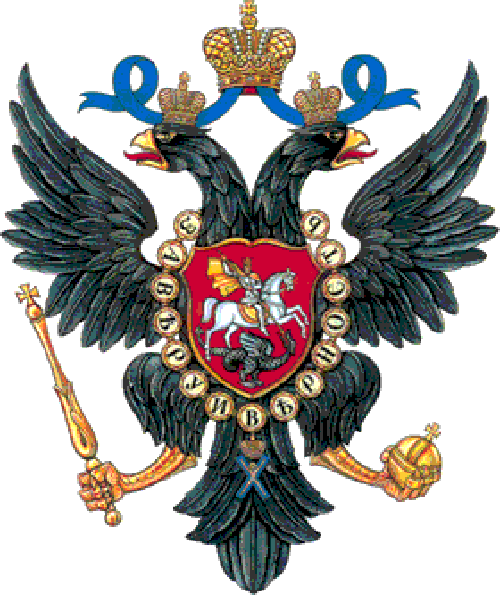
1725–1727: Imperial coat of arms under Catherine I

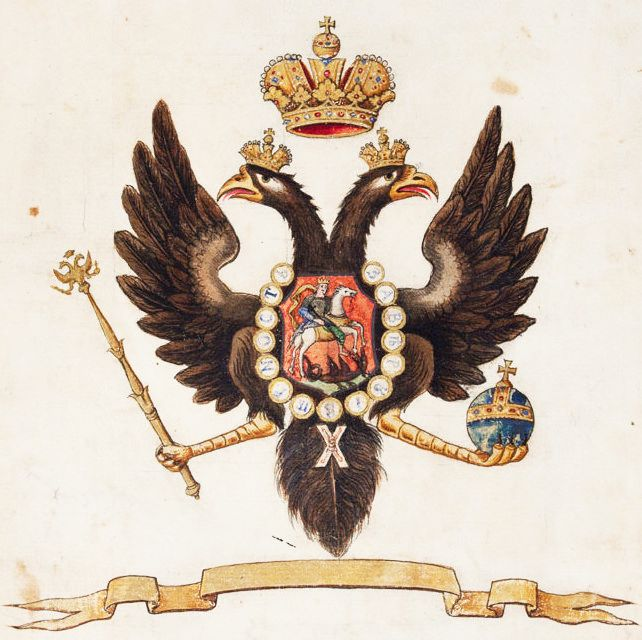
1727–1730: Imperial coat of arms under Peter II

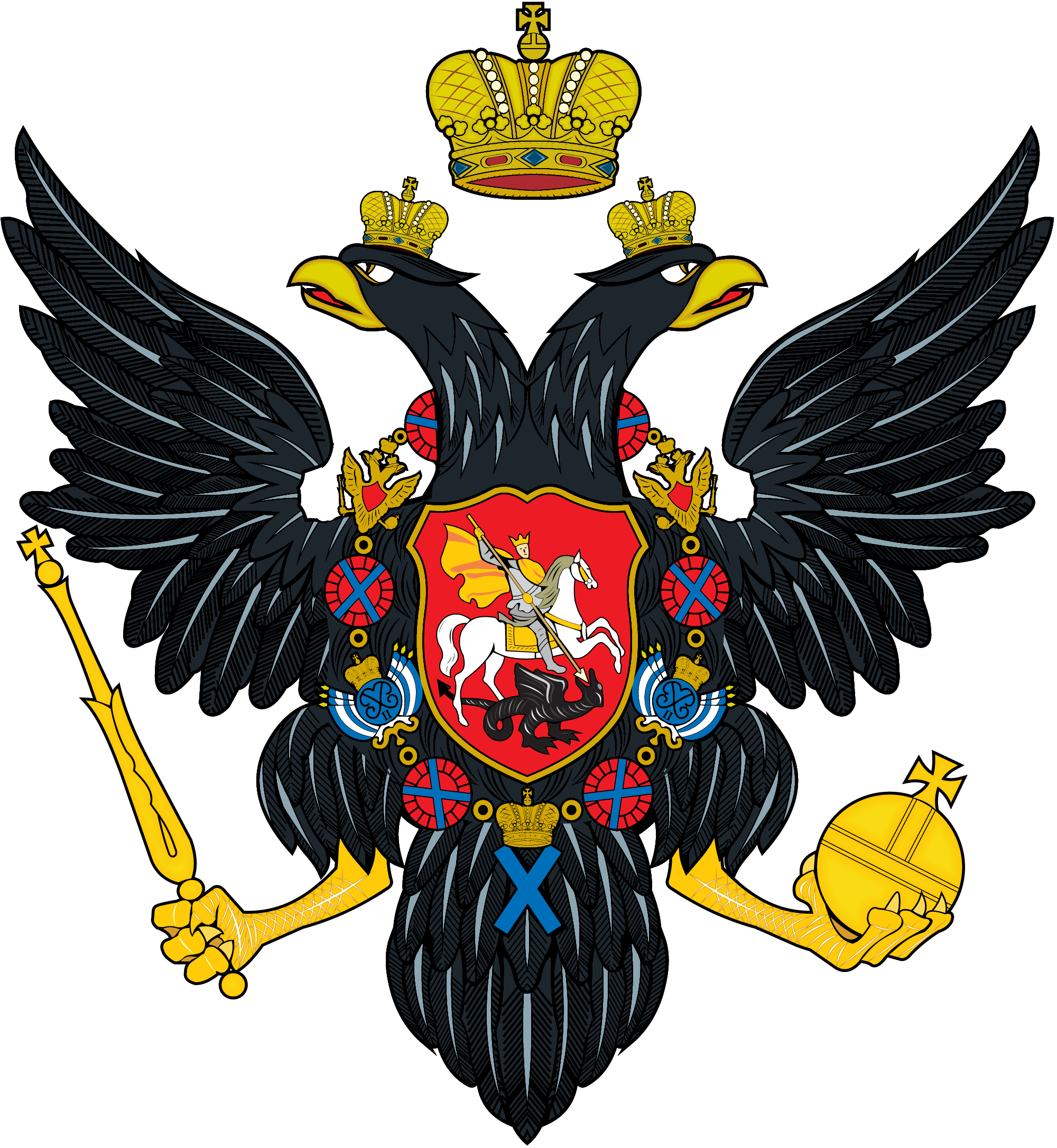
1730–1798, 1801–1825: Imperial coat of arms under Anna, Ivan VI, Elizabeth, Peter III, Catherine the Great, and Alexander I

1799–1801: Variant coat of arms under Paul I

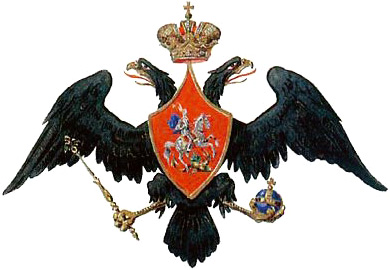
1825–1828: Imperial coat of arms under Nicholas I

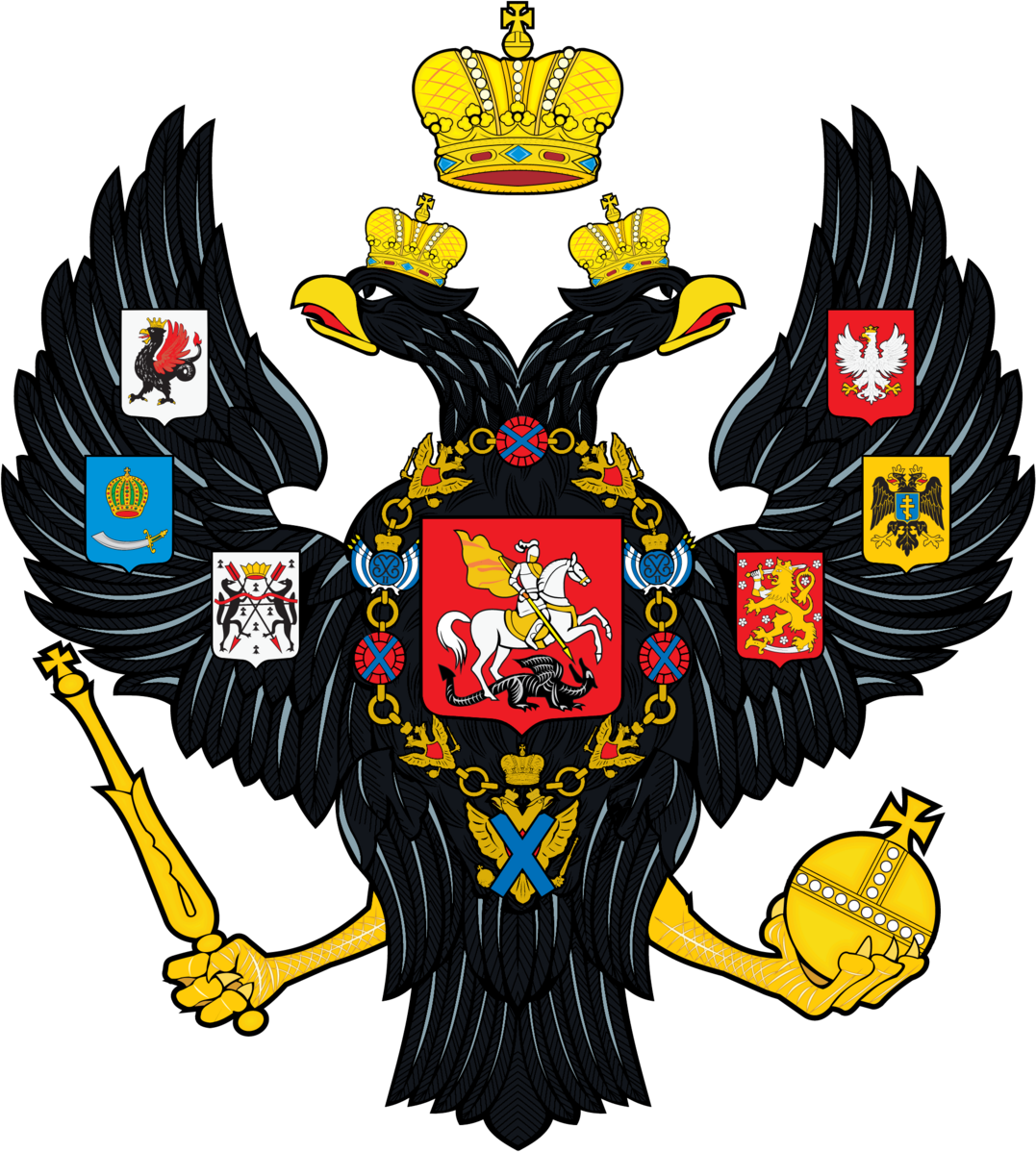
1828–1856: Imperial coat of arms under Nicholas I

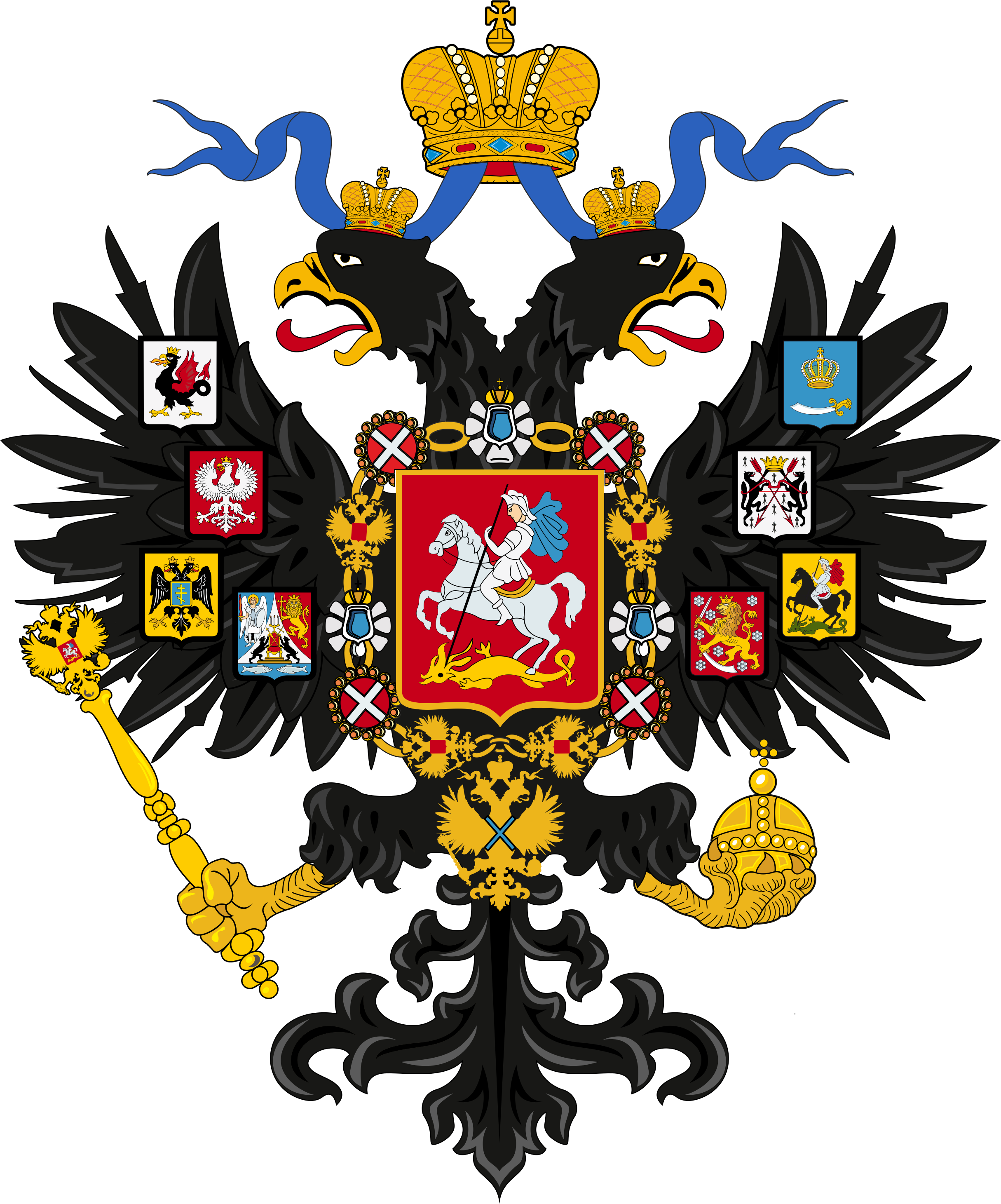
1856–1882: Lesser coat of arms under Alexander II

1882–1917: Coat of arms under Alexander III and Nicholas II

1882–1917: Lesser achievement under Alexander III and Nicholas II

1882–1917: Middle achievement under Alexander III and Nicholas II

1882–1917: Greater achievement under Alexander III and Nicholas II

1917: Coat of arms under the Russian Provisional Government

==== Flags ====
In 1552, Russian forces under Ivan the Terrible entered into Kazan under the banner of the Most Gracious Savior, a flag that accompanied the Russian army for the next century and a half. At the end of that period, on August 6, 1693, while sailing in the White Sea, Peter the Great unveiled a new flag, the so-called "Flag of the Tsar of Muscovy", a horizontal tricolor of white, blue, and red. On January 31, 1705, Peter decreed that it would be the maritime flag for all Russian commercial vessels. On June 23, 1858, Tsar Alexander II decreed that a black-yellow-white tricolor should be the official state flag of the Russian Empire, with colors based on the imperial coat of arms and the arms of the House of Romanov. On April 28, 1883, Tsar Alexander III authorized the use of the prior white-blue-red flag as a civic flag. On April 29, 1896, Tsar Nicholas II reverted to the tricolor as the state flag, with it being deemed the historical flag of Russia; despite this, the black-yellow-flag remains an icon of Tsarist Russia to this day and is still extensively used by Russian monarchists. During World War I, a special variant featuring the coat of arms in a yellow canton on the top left was used. After the February Revolution, the canton was removed by the Provisional Government.

Banner of the Most Merciful Savior, used as the flag under which Ivan conquered Kazan in 1552

1668–1693: Civil ensign

1693–1703: Imperial standard of Peter the Great

1696–1896: Civil ensign
1896–1917: State flag

1858–1896: State flag

1883–1917: Imperial standard of the Emperor of Russia. (Note: Earlier variants using prior variants of the coat of arms had been in use since the early 18th century)

1914–1917: Special state flag variant during World War I

=== Other ===
God Save the Tsar! was the official national anthem of the Russian Empire. Adopted in 1833, it was composed by Alexei Lvov, with lyrics written by the court poet Vasily Zhukovsky. It served as the official anthem until the Worker's Marseillaise was adopted following the abdication of Tsar Nicholas II. A myriad of regalia was used by the Russian Tsars. The Monomakh's Cap, a Central Asian-inspired crown, served as the crown of the Grand Princes and Tsars until Peter the Great and his brother Ivan V were crowned in 1682. After Peter, a new western-style crown was used for Catherine I, and a series of crowns were used until Catherine the Great commissioned the Imperial crown of Russia, used until the end of Tsarist Russia. The Russian Empire's motto was "God is with us!", (Note: Съ Нами Богъ!, S Nami Bog!) derived from the Orthodox liturgical exclamation used in the Great Compline service, itself a quotation from Isaiah 8:10. Engraved upon the two greater coat of arms of Russia, it expressed the fundamental premise of Tsarist political theology: that Russia was a divinely favored state and the Tsar a divinely appointed ruler.
